= Western Heights, Auckland =

Western Heights
- Suburb
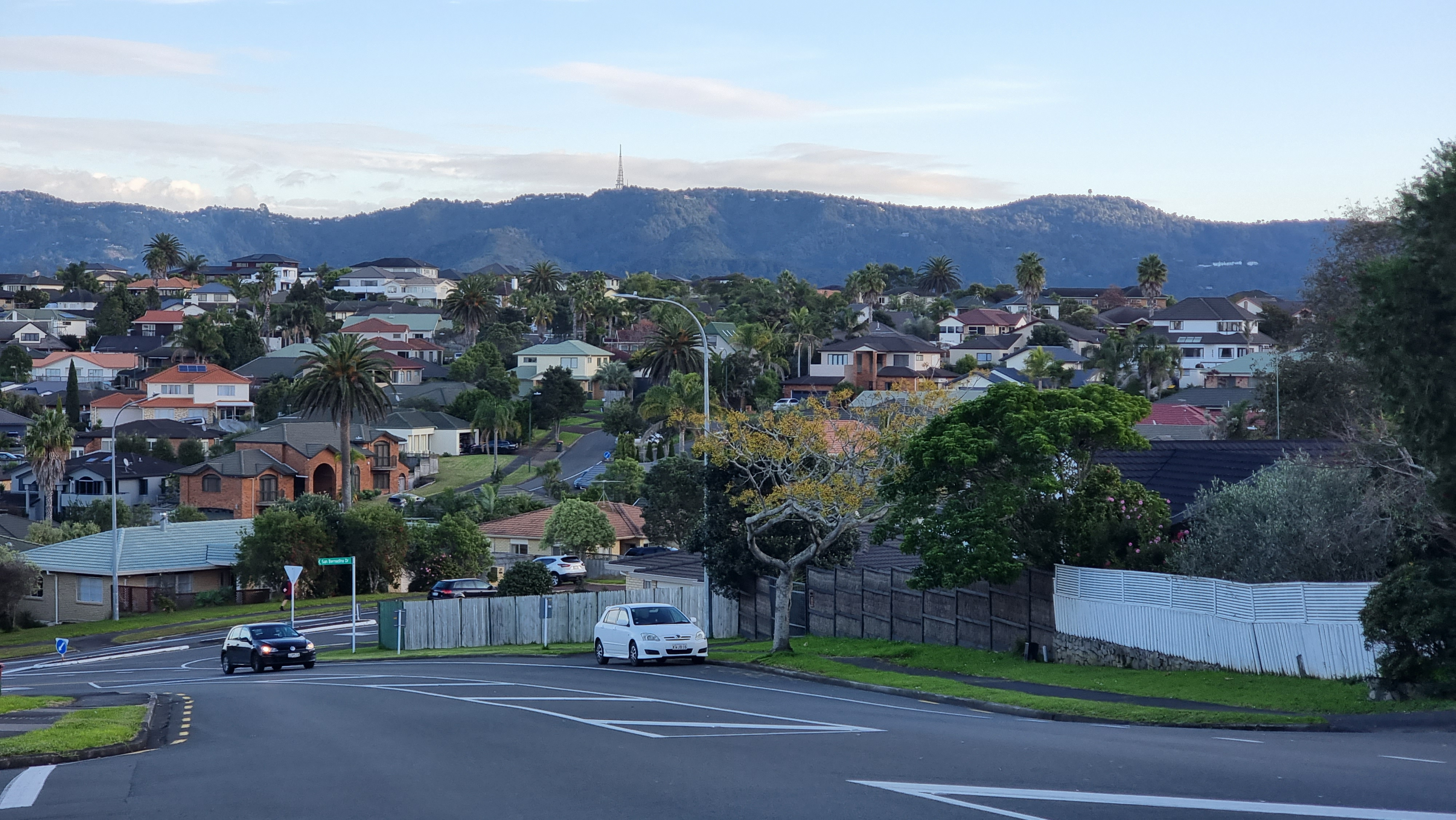
- View from Palomino Drive, looking toward the Waitākere Ranges
- Interactive map of Western Heights
- Coordinates: 36°52′59″S 174°36′54″E
- Country: New Zealand
- City: Auckland
- Local authority: Auckland Council
- Electoral ward: Waitākere Ward
- Local board: Henderson-Massey

Area
  - Land: 325 ha (800 acres)

Population (June 2025)
  - Total: 10,020
  - Density: 3,080/km^{2} (7,990/sq mi)
- Train stations: Sturges Road Railway Station

Rānui		Lincoln
	Western Heights	Henderson
Henderson Valley	McLaren Park	Sunnyvale

Western Heights is a neighbourhood of Henderson, in West Auckland, New Zealand. Western Heights School and the nearby shops are the centre of the community. Western Heights is a "frontier suburb", separating suburban Auckland from lifestyle farming blocks, orchards and the Waitākere Ranges.

Part of the area was called Summerland, from an export apple grown in local orchards in the mid-20th century.

== History ==
In the 1920s, the area was sparsely populated. The Sturges Road area was home to orchards, primarily grown by immigrant families from Dalmatia.

== Demographics ==
Western Heights covers 3.25 km^{2} (1.25 sq mi) and had an estimated population of 10,020 as of June 2025, with a population density of 3,083 people per km^{2}.

Historical population
Year	Pop.	±% p.a.
2006	7,956	—
2013	8,511	+0.97%
2018	9,324	+1.84%
2023	9,291	−0.07%
The 2006 population is for a larger area of 3.54 km^{2}. Source:

Western Heights had a population of 9,291 in the 2023 New Zealand census, a decrease of 33 people (−0.4%) since the 2018 census, and an increase of 780 people (9.2%) since the 2013 census. There were 4,575 males, 4,704 females and 18 people of other genders in 2,817 dwellings. 1.9% of people identified as LGBTIQ+. There were 1,785 people (19.2%) aged under 15 years, 1,755 (18.9%) aged 15 to 29, 4,473 (48.1%) aged 30 to 64, and 1,278 (13.8%) aged 65 or older.

People could identify as more than one ethnicity. The results were 41.5% European (Pākehā); 10.2% Māori; 12.2% Pasifika; 45.9% Asian; 2.9% Middle Eastern, Latin American and African New Zealanders (MELAA); and 2.6% other, which includes people giving their ethnicity as "New Zealander". English was spoken by 92.3%, Māori language by 2.3%, Samoan by 3.5%, and other languages by 36.5%. No language could be spoken by 2.3% (e.g. too young to talk). New Zealand Sign Language was known by 0.5%. The percentage of people born overseas was 46.9, compared with 28.8% nationally.

Religious affiliations were 36.2% Christian, 9.0% Hindu, 4.6% Islam, 0.6% Māori religious beliefs, 2.2% Buddhist, 0.3% New Age, 0.1% Jewish, and 1.9% other religions. People who answered that they had no religion were 39.5%, and 6.0% of people did not answer the census question.

Of those at least 15 years old, 2,322 (30.9%) people had a bachelor's or higher degree, 3,267 (43.5%) had a post-high school certificate or diploma, and 1,926 (25.7%) people exclusively held high school qualifications. 972 people (12.9%) earned over $100,000 compared to 12.1% nationally. The employment status of those at least 15 was that 4,080 (54.4%) people were employed full-time, 870 (11.6%) were part-time, and 207 (2.8%) were unemployed.

Individual statistical areas
Name	Area (km^{2})	Population	Density (per km^{2})	Dwellings	Median age	Median income
Summerland South	1.33	3,132	2,355	969	38.7 years	$44,500
Summerland North	0.85	2,532	2,979	819	38.3 years	$47,100
Western Heights	1.07	3,627	3,390	1,029	37.2 years	$44,700
New Zealand					38.1 years	$41,500

== Education ==
Western Heights School and Summerland Primary are coeducational contributing primary (years 1–6) schools with rolls of 660 and 611 respectively, as of July 2025. Summerland Primary opened in 2002. The area is named for the summerland apple variety once grown there.

The local State secondary schools are Henderson High School, Waitakere College, Massey High School, Liston College and St Dominic's College.
