= McLaren Park, New Zealand =

McLaren Park
- Suburb
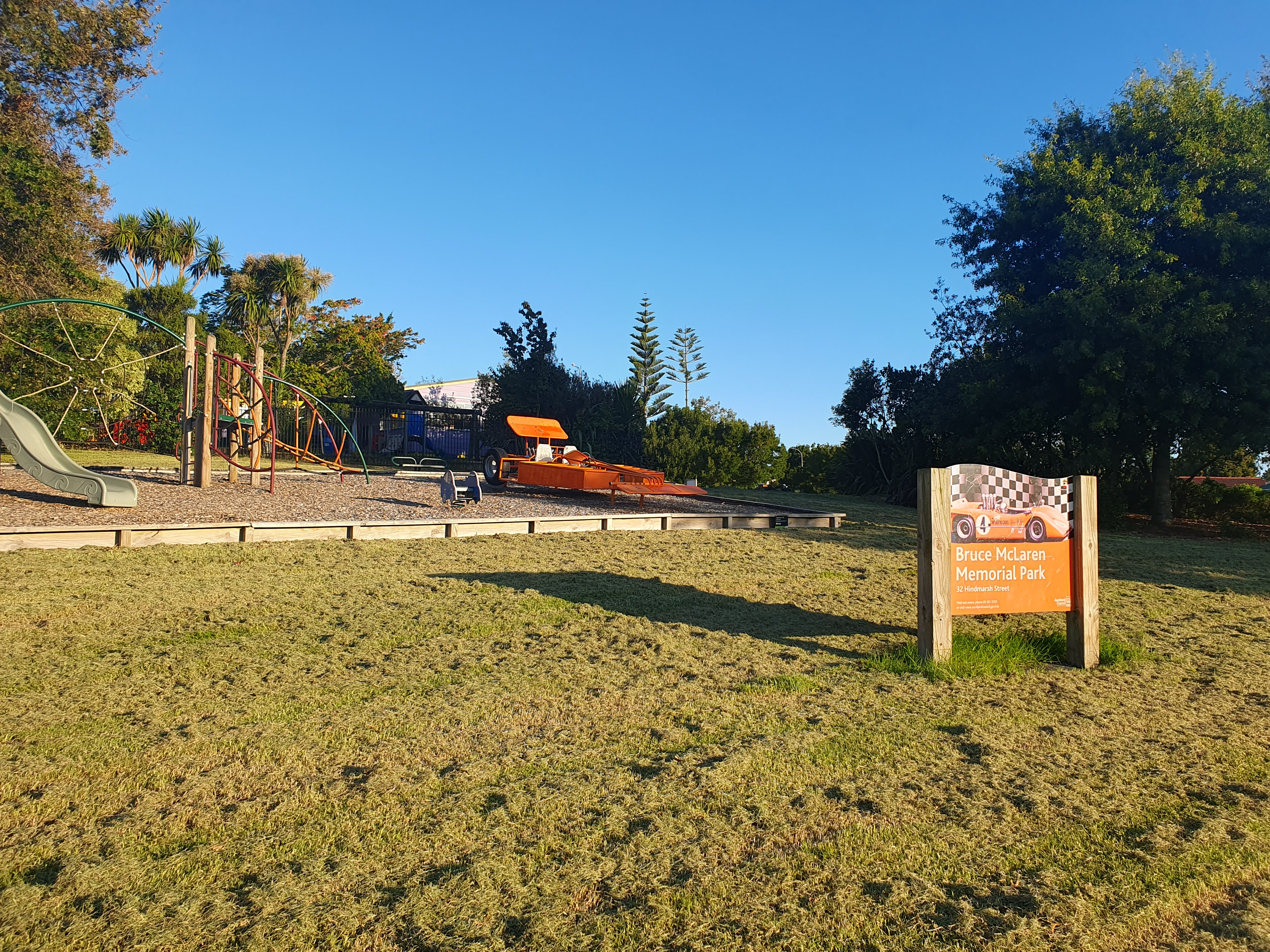
- A McLaren M7C-themed playground at the Bruce McLaren Memorial Park
- Interactive map of McLaren Park
- Coordinates: 36.898129°S 174.617678°E
- Country: New Zealand
- City: Auckland
- Local authority: Auckland Council
- Electoral ward: Waitākere ward
- Local board: Henderson-Massey Local Board; Waitākere Ranges Local Board

Area
  - Land: 79 ha (200 acres)

Population (June 2025)
  - Total: 3,810
  - Density: 4,800/km^{2} (12,000/sq mi)

	Western Heights	Henderson
Henderson Valley	McLaren Park	Sunnyvale
	Oratia	Glen Eden

McLaren Park is a suburb of West Auckland, New Zealand. It is named after New Zealand Formula One driver and founder of the McLaren Formula One Team Bruce McLaren. The local State secondary schools are Henderson High School, Rutherford College, St Dominic's College and Liston College.

== Demographics ==
The statistical area of McLaren Memorial Park covers 0.79 km^{2} (0.31 sq mi) and had an estimated population of 3,810 as of June 2025, with a population density of 4,823 people per km^{2}.

Historical population
Year	Pop.	±% p.a.
2006	3,894	—
2013	3,246	−2.57%
2018	3,342	+0.58%
2023	3,495	+0.90%
The 2006 population is for a larger area of 1.09 km^{2}. Source:

McLaren Memorial Park had a population of 3,495 in the 2023 New Zealand census, an increase of 153 people (4.6%) since the 2018 census, and an increase of 249 people (7.7%) since the 2013 census. There were 1,692 males, 1,794 females and 9 people of other genders in 1,026 dwellings. 3.3% of people identified as LGBTIQ+. The median age was 32.2 years (compared with 38.1 years nationally). There were 828 people (23.7%) aged under 15 years, 774 (22.1%) aged 15 to 29, 1,587 (45.4%) aged 30 to 64, and 306 (8.8%) aged 65 or older.

People could identify as more than one ethnicity. The results were 36.8% European (Pākehā); 18.3% Māori; 36.8% Pasifika; 26.2% Asian; 2.1% Middle Eastern, Latin American and African New Zealanders (MELAA); and 1.3% other, which includes people giving their ethnicity as "New Zealander". English was spoken by 90.1%, Māori language by 5.2%, Samoan by 12.9%, and other languages by 24.8%. No language could be spoken by 3.5% (e.g. too young to talk). New Zealand Sign Language was known by 0.3%. The percentage of people born overseas was 36.7, compared with 28.8% nationally.

Religious affiliations were 44.1% Christian, 5.3% Hindu, 2.2% Islam, 1.5% Māori religious beliefs, 1.3% Buddhist, 0.3% New Age, 0.2% Jewish, and 1.2% other religions. People who answered that they had no religion were 36.9%, and 7.3% of people did not answer the census question.

Of those at least 15 years old, 513 (19.2%) people had a bachelor's or higher degree, 1,251 (46.9%) had a post-high school certificate or diploma, and 903 (33.9%) people exclusively held high school qualifications. The median income was $40,800, compared with $41,500 nationally. 153 people (5.7%) earned over $100,000 compared to 12.1% nationally. The employment status of those at least 15 was that 1,440 (54.0%) people were employed full-time, 252 (9.4%) were part-time, and 120 (4.5%) were unemployed.

== Education ==
Bruce McLaren Intermediate is an intermediate (years 7-8) school with a roll of 269 students.

Waitakere Seventh-day Adventist School is a full primary (years 1-8) school with a roll of 76 students.

Both schools are coeducational. Rolls are as at July 2025.
