= Lincoln, Auckland =

Lincoln
- Suburb
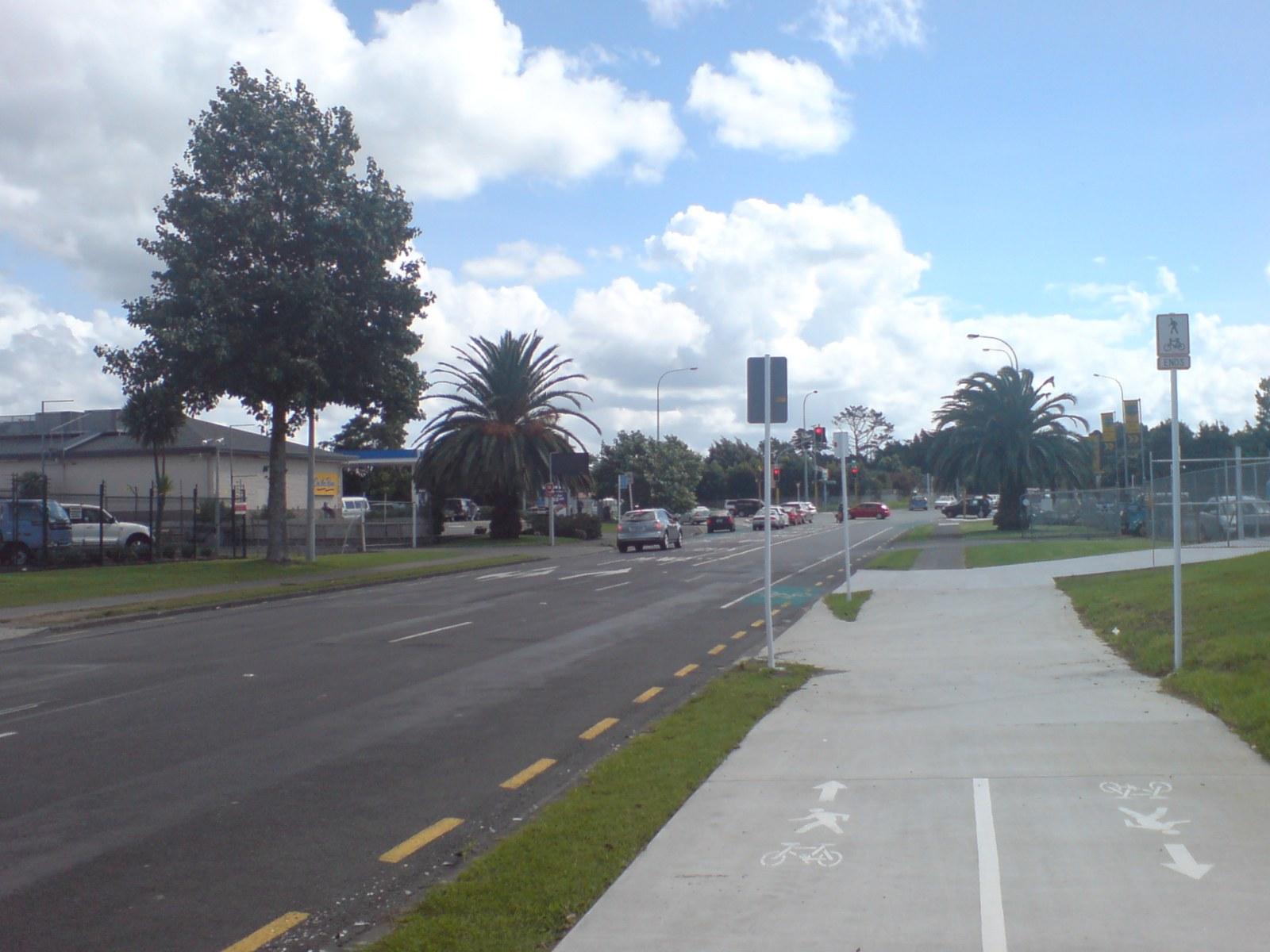
- Central Park Drive
- Interactive map of Lincoln
- Coordinates: 36°51′26″S 174°37′48″E
- Country: New Zealand
- City: Auckland
- Local authority: Auckland Council
- Electoral ward: Waitākere ward
- Local board: Henderson-Massey

Area
  - Land: 517 ha (1,280 acres)

Population (June 2025)
  - Total: 11,730
  - Density: 2,270/km^{2} (5,880/sq mi)
- Postcode: 0619

Massey West	(Henderson Creek)	Te Atatū Peninsula
Rānui	Lincoln	Te Atatū South
Western Heights	Henderson	Glendene

Lincoln is a suburb in West Auckland, New Zealand. The suburb is sometimes called Lincoln North or treated as part of Henderson North to avoid confusion with Lincoln in Canterbury.

== Demographics ==
Lincoln comprises four statistical areas. Henderson Larnoch, Henderson Lincoln West and Henderson Lincoln South are primarily residential. Henderson Lincoln East is primarily commercial.

=== Residential area ===
The residential area of Lincoln covers 3.22 km^{2} (1.24 sq mi) and had an estimated population of 11,380 as of June 2025, with a population density of 3,534 people per km^{2}.

Historical population of the residential area
Year	Pop.	±% p.a.
2006	8,445	—
2013	9,066	+1.02%
2018	9,951	+1.88%
2023	10,176	+0.45%

The residential areas had a population of 10,176 in the 2023 New Zealand census, an increase of 225 people (2.3%) since the 2018 census, and an increase of 1,110 people (12.2%) since the 2013 census. There were 5,142 males, 5,007 females and 24 people of other genders in 3,000 dwellings. 3.0% of people identified as LGBTIQ+. There were 2,124 people (20.9%) aged under 15 years, 2,262 (22.2%) aged 15 to 29, 4,737 (46.6%) aged 30 to 64, and 1,050 (10.3%) aged 65 or older.

People could identify as more than one ethnicity. The results were 32.3% European (Pākehā); 18.9% Māori; 24.3% Pasifika; 39.9% Asian; 2.7% Middle Eastern, Latin American and African New Zealanders (MELAA); and 1.7% other, which includes people giving their ethnicity as "New Zealander". English was spoken by 89.3%, Māori language by 4.4%, Samoan by 6.6%, and other languages by 32.3%. No language could be spoken by 2.9% (e.g. too young to talk). New Zealand Sign Language was known by 0.6%. The percentage of people born overseas was 46.8, compared with 28.8% nationally.

Religious affiliations were 41.8% Christian, 6.3% Hindu, 3.1% Islam, 1.6% Māori religious beliefs, 2.3% Buddhist, 0.2% New Age, 0.1% Jewish, and 1.6% other religions. People who answered that they had no religion were 36.3%, and 6.9% of people did not answer the census question.

Of those at least 15 years old, 1,746 (21.7%) people had a bachelor's or higher degree, 3,261 (40.5%) had a post-high school certificate or diploma, and 3,033 (37.7%) people exclusively held high school qualifications. 459 people (5.7%) earned over $100,000 compared to 12.1% nationally. The employment status of those at least 15 was that 4,182 (51.9%) people were employed full-time, 840 (10.4%) were part-time, and 342 (4.2%) were unemployed.

=== Commercial area ===
The commercial area covers 1.94 km^{2} (0.75 sq mi) and had an estimated population of 350 as of June 2025, with a population density of 180 people per km^{2}.

Historical population of the commercial area
Year	Pop.	±% p.a.
2006	306	—
2013	309	+0.14%
2018	138	−14.89%
2023	210	+8.76%

The commercial area had a population of 210 in the 2023 New Zealand census, an increase of 72 people (52.2%) since the 2018 census, and a decrease of 99 people (−32.0%) since the 2013 census. There were 99 males and 114 females in 132 dwellings. 1.4% of people identified as LGBTIQ+. The median age was 76.2 years (compared with 38.1 years nationally). There were 0 people (0.0%) aged under 15 years, 27 (12.9%) aged 15 to 29, 39 (18.6%) aged 30 to 64, and 147 (70.0%) aged 65 or older.

People could identify as more than one ethnicity. The results were 84.3% European (Pākehā); 5.7% Māori; 1.4% Pasifika; 11.4% Asian; and 1.4% Middle Eastern, Latin American and African New Zealanders (MELAA). English was spoken by 97.1%, Māori language by 1.4%, Samoan by 1.4%, and other languages by 12.9%. The percentage of people born overseas was 34.3, compared with 28.8% nationally.

Religious affiliations were 60.0% Christian, 1.4% Hindu, and 1.4% Buddhist. People who answered that they had no religion were 28.6%, and 8.6% of people did not answer the census question.

Of those at least 15 years old, 39 (18.6%) people had a bachelor's or higher degree, 96 (45.7%) had a post-high school certificate or diploma, and 75 (35.7%) people exclusively held high school qualifications. The median income was $26,300, compared with $41,500 nationally. 6 people (2.9%) earned over $100,000 compared to 12.1% nationally. The employment status of those at least 15 was that 27 (12.9%) people were employed full-time and 21 (10.0%) were part-time.

=== Individual statistical areas ===
Individual statistical areas
Name	Area (km^{2})	Population	Density (per km^{2})	Dwellings	Median age	Median income
Henderson Larnoch	0.82	3,609	4,401	987	32.3 years	$36,900
Henderson Lincoln West	0.90	3,387	3,763	1,032	33.6 years	$39,000
Henderson Lincoln South	1.50	3,180	2,120	981	36.5 years	$36,300
Henderson Lincoln East	1.95	210	108	132	76.2 years	$26,300
New Zealand					38.1 years	$41,500

== Main Roads ==
The Northwestern Motorway passes through the northern part of the suburb, with the "Lincoln Road" junction providing access.

Lincoln Road runs through the suburb and is the main road for the suburb with Universal Drive and Central Park Drive the main support routes in and out of the suburbs.

== Main centres ==
Lincoln North mall is a small shopping centre on the corner of Lincoln Road and Universal Drive, and across Universal Drive are a Pak'n Save supermarket and Mitre 10 megastore.

== Schools ==
Pomaria Road School is a contributing primary (years 1-6) school with a roll of 435 students. The school opened about 1960. It has operated a Kohanga Reo (Māori language immersion kindergarten) since 1992.

ACG Sunderland School and College is a private school with a roll of 886 students. They opened at the beginning of 2007.

Both schools are coeducational. Rolls are as of July 2026.

Henderson High School, Liston College and St Dominic's College are in Henderson North to the south of Lincoln.
