= Waitemata City =

Former city in Auckland Region, New Zealand

- City of New Zealand
- 1974–1989
- History
  - Established: 1974
  - Disestablished: 1989
- Today part of: Auckland Region

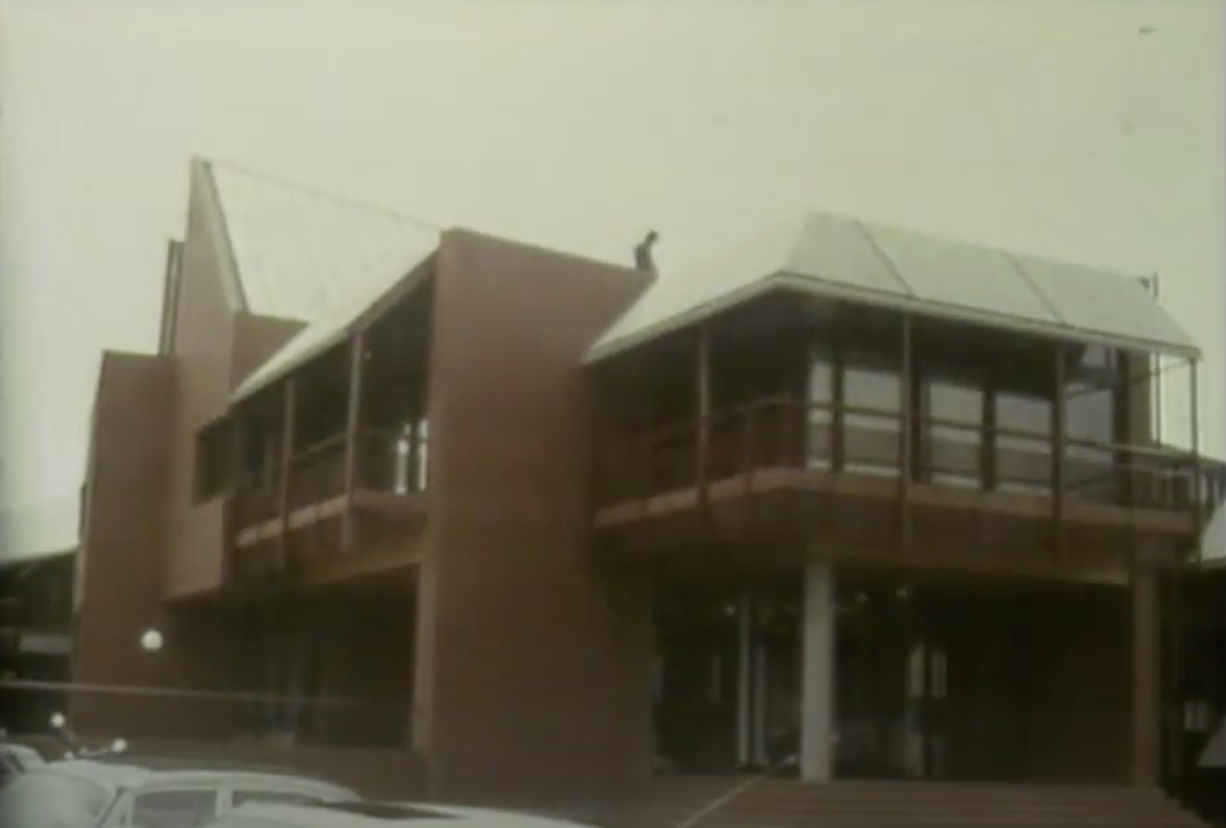
The Waitemata City Council Chambers in 1983

Waitemata City was a territorial authority in urban parts of western Auckland. It was formed in 1974 from the southwestern part of the old Waitemata County. Both the County and City took their names from the Waitematā Harbour. In 1989, when New Zealand local government bodies underwent a major re-organisation, Waitemata City joined with its southern neighbours, the boroughs of Henderson, Glen Eden, and New Lynn, to form Waitakere City.

== History ==
Waitemata City formed on 1 August 1974 from the Titirangi, Te Atatu, Lincoln and Waitakere ridings of Waitemata County. The city was composed of most of modern West Auckland, except for the boroughs of New Lynn, Glen Eden and Henderson. Henderson borough refused to amalgamate into the city, preferring to retain its unique identity, while the New Lynn and Glen Eden borough councils were interested, but were unable to meet the deadline to merge.

The Waitemata City Council offices opened in 1983, at the modern location of ACG Sunderland. This was the first time that the Waitemata City or Waitemata Borough local government offices had been located in its own territory; variously located in central Auckland or Henderson Borough in the past.

With the 1989 local government reforms, the Waitemata City merged with the New Lynn, Glen Eden and Henderson boroughs to form Waitakere City.

== List of mayors ==
Mayors of Waitemata City were:

	Name	Term
1	Jack Colvin	1975–1977
2	Ian McHardy	1977–1980
3	Tony Covic	1980–1983
4	Tim Shadbolt	1983–1989

== Bibliography ==
- Reidy, Jade (2009). "How the West Was Run". In Macdonald, Finlay; Kerr, Ruth (eds.). West: The History of Waitakere. Random House. pp. 237–256. ISBN 9781869790080.
