= Glendene, New Zealand =

Glendene
- Suburb
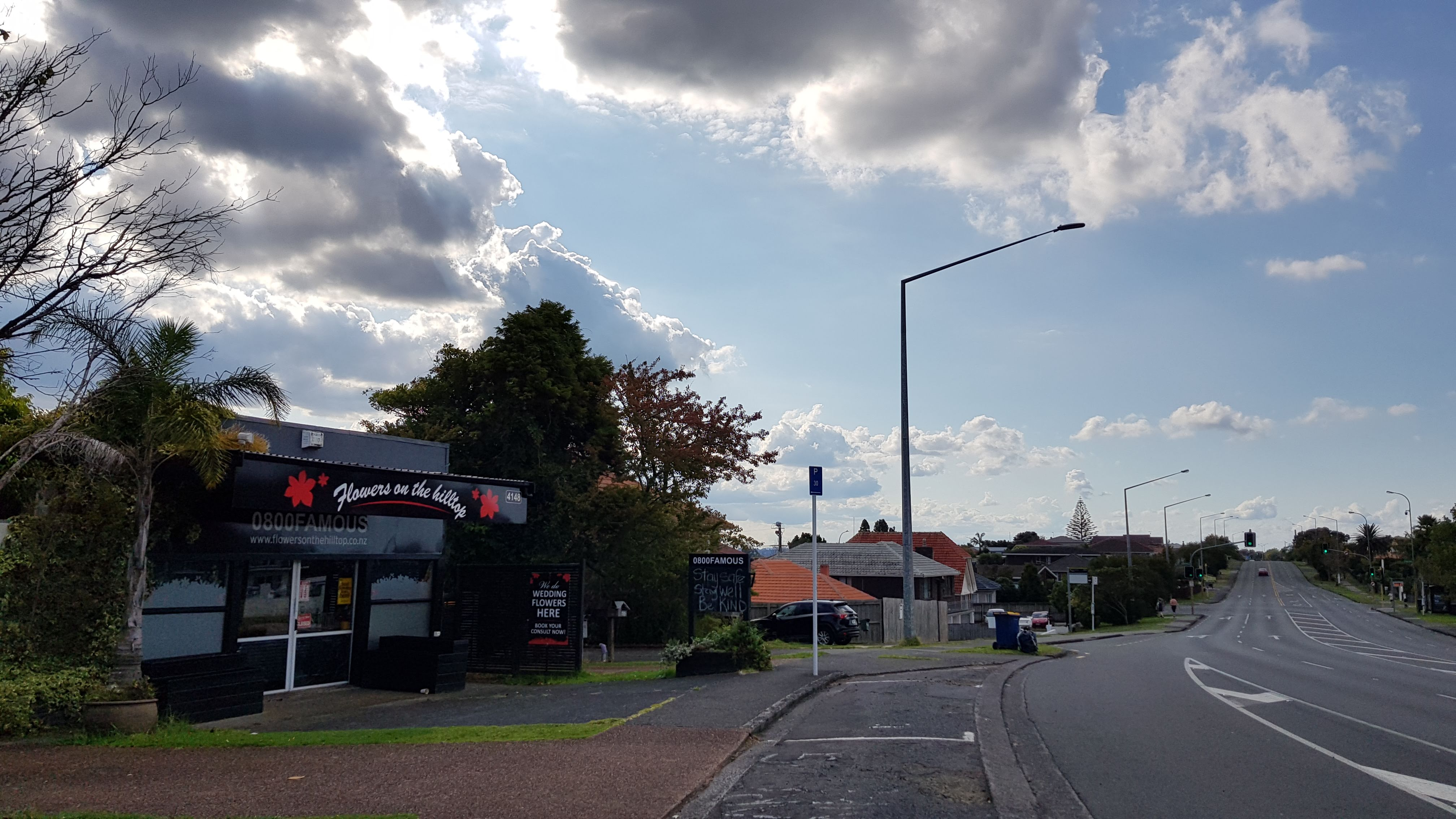
- Interactive map of Glendene
- Coordinates: 36°53′22″S 174°39′13″E
- Country: New Zealand
- City: Auckland
- Local authority: Auckland Council
- Electoral ward: Waitākere ward; Whau ward
- Local board: Henderson-Massey Local Board; Whau Local Board

Area
  - Land: 251 ha (620 acres)

Population (June 2025)
  - Total: 8,460
  - Density: 3,370/km^{2} (8,730/sq mi)
- Postcode: 0602

Henderson	Te Atatū South	(Whau River)
Sunnyvale	Glendene	Kelston
Oratia	Glen Eden	New Lynn

Glendene is a suburb of West Auckland, in New Zealand. It is under the local governance of the Auckland Council.

Glendene is a mainly residential suburb with the north-eastern portion devoted to light industry.

== History ==
Glendene is named after a farm in the area owned by Percy Jones, which was later subdivided for housing. The Western shores of the Whau River were home to many clay and pottery yards in the late 19th and early 20th centuries, including the Malam, Laurie, Black & Scott and Hepburn yards. Most of the development of Glendene as a residential suburb occurred in the 1960s and 1970s.

In April 2014, Glendene became a part of the new Kelston electorate.

The Glendene Community Hub was opened in March 2015 in response to Council studies that showed a need for community development in the area.

== Demographics ==
Glendene covers 2.51 km^{2} (0.97 sq mi) and had an estimated population of 8,460 as of June 2025, with a population density of 3,371 people per km^{2}.

Historical population
Year	Pop.	±% p.a.
2006	6,621	—
2013	6,921	+0.64%
2018	7,563	+1.79%
2023	7,719	+0.41%

Glendene had a population of 7,719 in the 2023 New Zealand census, an increase of 156 people (2.1%) since the 2018 census, and an increase of 798 people (11.5%) since the 2013 census. There were 3,900 males, 3,789 females and 30 people of other genders in 2,403 dwellings. 3.0% of people identified as LGBTIQ+. The median age was 35.5 years (compared with 38.1 years nationally). There were 1,494 people (19.4%) aged under 15 years, 1,632 (21.1%) aged 15 to 29, 3,645 (47.2%) aged 30 to 64, and 948 (12.3%) aged 65 or older.

People could identify as more than one ethnicity. The results were 37.9% European (Pākehā); 15.0% Māori; 28.2% Pasifika; 33.1% Asian; 2.9% Middle Eastern, Latin American and African New Zealanders (MELAA); and 1.4% other, which includes people giving their ethnicity as "New Zealander". English was spoken by 92.7%, Māori language by 3.6%, Samoan by 8.6%, and other languages by 30.2%. No language could be spoken by 2.5% (e.g. too young to talk). New Zealand Sign Language was known by 0.5%. The percentage of people born overseas was 40.7, compared with 28.8% nationally.

Religious affiliations were 39.6% Christian, 8.7% Hindu, 5.1% Islam, 1.1% Māori religious beliefs, 2.1% Buddhist, 0.3% New Age, 0.1% Jewish, and 1.5% other religions. People who answered that they had no religion were 34.2%, and 7.5% of people did not answer the census question.

Of those at least 15 years old, 1,389 (22.3%) people had a bachelor's or higher degree, 2,949 (47.4%) had a post-high school certificate or diploma, and 1,890 (30.4%) people exclusively held high school qualifications. The median income was $41,700, compared with $41,500 nationally. 501 people (8.0%) earned over $100,000 compared to 12.1% nationally. The employment status of those at least 15 was that 3,309 (53.2%) people were employed full-time, 642 (10.3%) were part-time, and 252 (4.0%) were unemployed.

Individual statistical areas
Name	Area (km^{2})	Population	Density (per km^{2})	Dwellings	Median age	Median income
Glendene North West	0.66	2,448	3,709	816	37.3 years	$43,200
Glendene North East	0.75	2,256	3,008	660	34.2 years	$39,500
Glendene South	1.10	3,015	2,741	927	35.3 years	$42,300
New Zealand					38.1 years	$41,500

== Education ==
The local primary school (years 1 - 6) is Glendene School (opened in 1965) It is coeducational. The roll was 112 as of July 2025.

Nearby secondary schools are Henderson High School, Kelston Boys' High School, Kelston Girls' College, Liston College and St Dominic's College.
