= West Harbour, Auckland =

Coastal suburb in Auckland, New Zealand

West Harbour
- Suburb
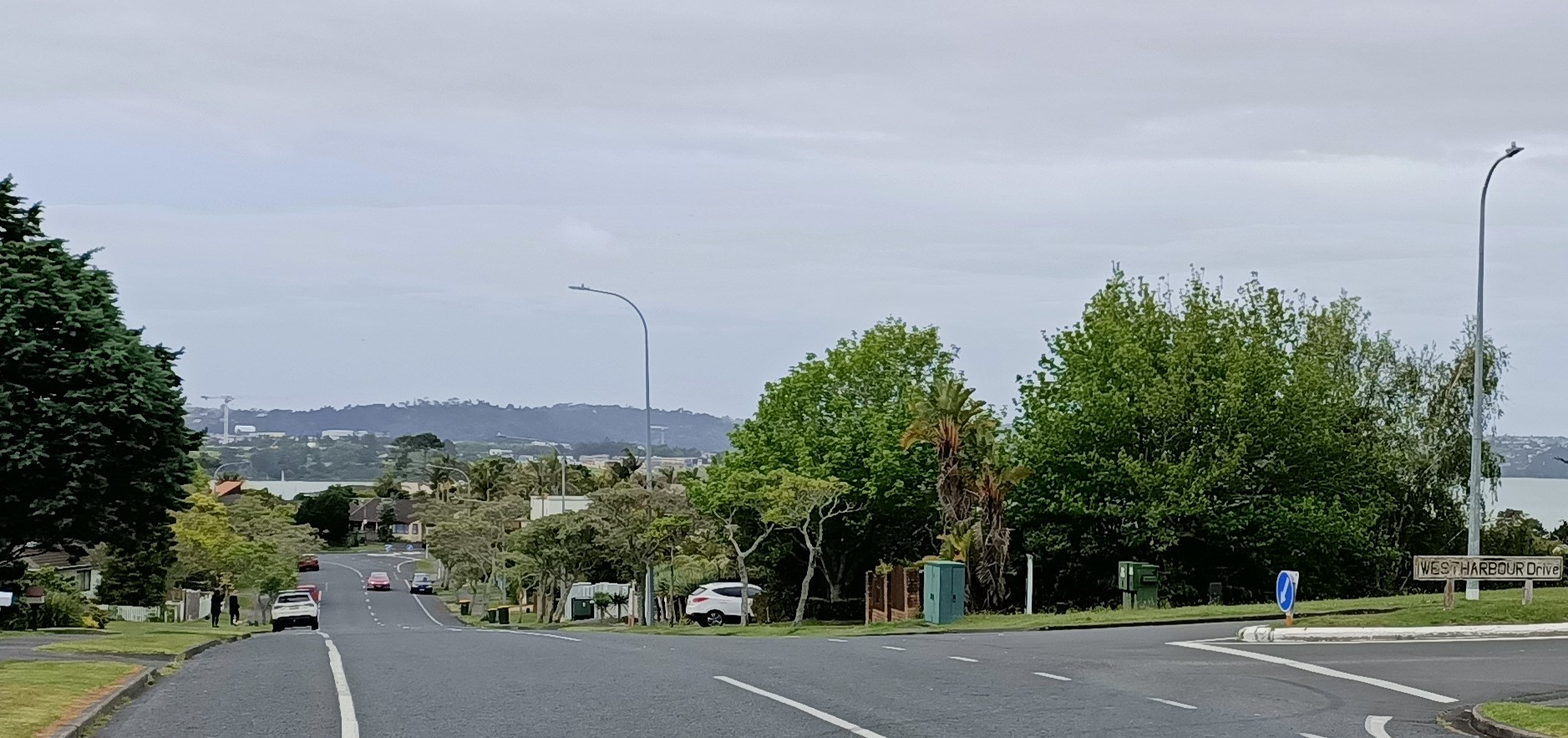
- Luckens Road, looking north-east towards Hobsonville and Greenhithe
- Interactive map of West Harbour
- Coordinates: 36.8094°S 174.6418°E
- Country: New Zealand
- City: Auckland
- Local authority: Auckland Council
- Electoral ward: Albany ward; Waitākere ward
- Local board: Upper Harbour Local Board; Henderson-Massey Local Board

Area
  - Land: 427 ha (1,060 acres)

Population (June 2025)
  - Total: 11,880
  - Density: 2,780/km^{2} (7,210/sq mi)
- Postcode: 0618
- Ferry terminals: West Harbour Ferry Terminal

Kumeū	Whenuapai	Hobsonville
Westgate, New Zealand	West Harbour	(Waitematā Harbour)
Massey	Royal Heights	Te Atatū Peninsula

West Harbour is a suburb of Auckland, located to the west of the Auckland isthmus and CBD. It is named for its location on the western side of the Waitematā Harbour. West Harbour is under the governance of Auckland Council after the amalgamation of district councils in 2010.

Local features include many public reserves (the most prominent being Luckens Reserve, which in 2014 received a basketball court), tennis courts, two local primary schools, West Harbour School and Marina View School, a Church, and farm land. West Harbour is home to Hobsonville Marina, a large marina catering to around 600 boats and yachts, which was part of the route the Royal Family took during their 2014 visit.

== History ==
Most of West Harbour was developed in the 1980s and 1990s.

== Demographics ==
West Harbour covers 4.27 km^{2} (1.65 sq mi) and had an estimated population of 11,880 as of June 2025, with a population density of 2,782 people per km^{2}.

Historical population
Year	Pop.	±% p.a.
2006	10,827	—
2013	10,851	+0.03%
2018	11,370	+0.94%
2023	11,169	−0.36%

West Harbour had a population of 11,169 in the 2023 New Zealand census, a decrease of 201 people (−1.8%) since the 2018 census, and an increase of 318 people (2.9%) since the 2013 census. There were 5,613 males, 5,529 females and 30 people of other genders in 3,471 dwellings. 3.4% of people identified as LGBTIQ+. The median age was 37.0 years (compared with 38.1 years nationally). There were 2,217 people (19.8%) aged under 15 years, 2,139 (19.2%) aged 15 to 29, 5,286 (47.3%) aged 30 to 64, and 1,524 (13.6%) aged 65 or older.

People could identify as more than one ethnicity. The results were 52.8% European (Pākehā); 13.6% Māori; 11.5% Pasifika; 34.0% Asian; 2.7% Middle Eastern, Latin American and African New Zealanders (MELAA); and 2.8% other, which includes people giving their ethnicity as "New Zealander". English was spoken by 90.9%, Māori language by 2.6%, Samoan by 2.2%, and other languages by 31.5%. No language could be spoken by 2.5% (e.g. too young to talk). New Zealand Sign Language was known by 0.6%. The percentage of people born overseas was 40.7, compared with 28.8% nationally.

Religious affiliations were 30.9% Christian, 3.4% Hindu, 2.1% Islam, 0.9% Māori religious beliefs, 2.0% Buddhist, 0.4% New Age, 0.1% Jewish, and 1.0% other religions. People who answered that they had no religion were 53.6%, and 5.8% of people did not answer the census question.

Of those at least 15 years old, 1,938 (21.6%) people had a bachelor's or higher degree, 4,221 (47.2%) had a post-high school certificate or diploma, and 2,292 (25.6%) people exclusively held high school qualifications. The median income was $44,500, compared with $41,500 nationally. 1,197 people (13.4%) earned over $100,000 compared to 12.1% nationally. The employment status of those at least 15 was that 4,725 (52.8%) people were employed full-time, 1,128 (12.6%) were part-time, and 303 (3.4%) were unemployed.

Individual statistical areas
Name	Area (km^{2})	Population	Density (per km^{2})	Dwellings	Median age	Median income
West Harbour West	1.93	4,230	2,192	1,320	32.2 years	$42,400
West Harbour Clearwater Cove	1.10	3,561	3,237	1,107	41.8 years	$44,300
West Harbour Luckens Point	1.24	3,378	2,724	1,044	39.7 years	$48,700
New Zealand					38.1 years	$41,500

== Education ==
Local State secondary schools are Hobsonville Point Secondary School, Massey High School, Rutherford College, Henderson High School, Liston College, Waitakere College and St Dominic's College.

== Amenities ==
The Manutewhau Walk Reserve is an area of native bush reserve found in West Harbour, along the banks of the Manutewhau Stream. The reserve is adjacent to Moire Park, a large public park and sportsfield.

== Gallery ==
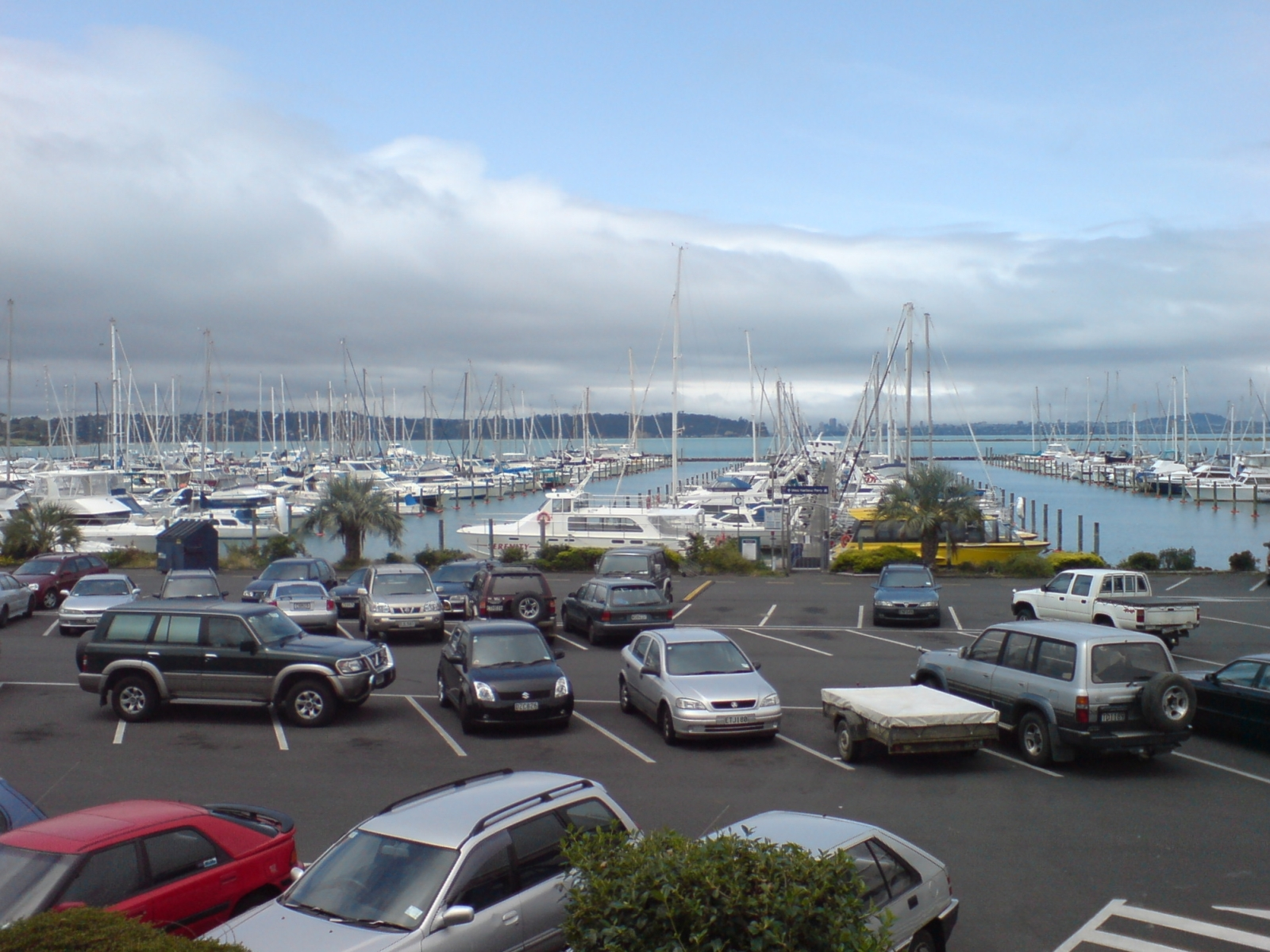
The Hobsonville Marina and West Harbour Ferry Terminal

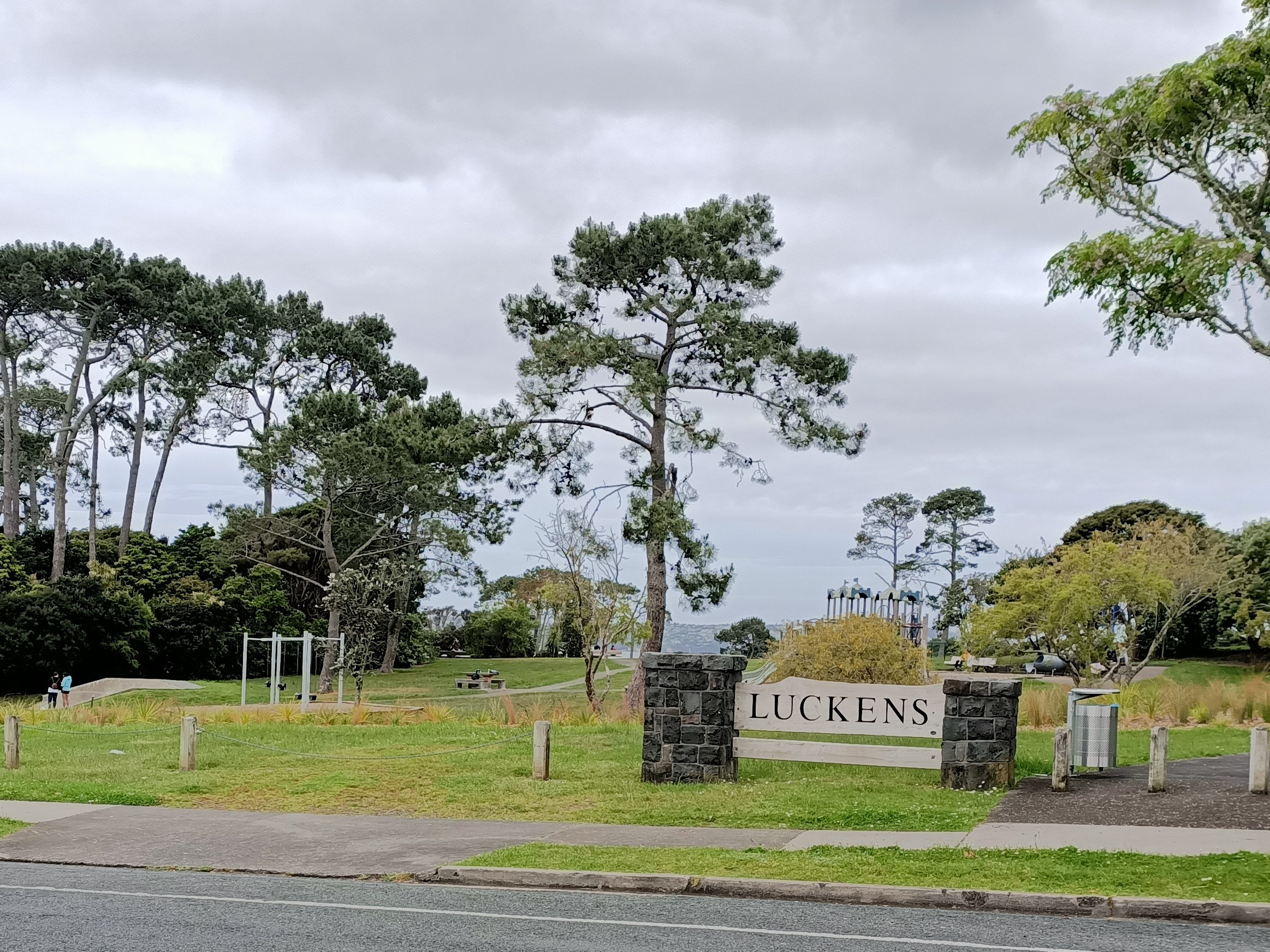
Luckens Reserve

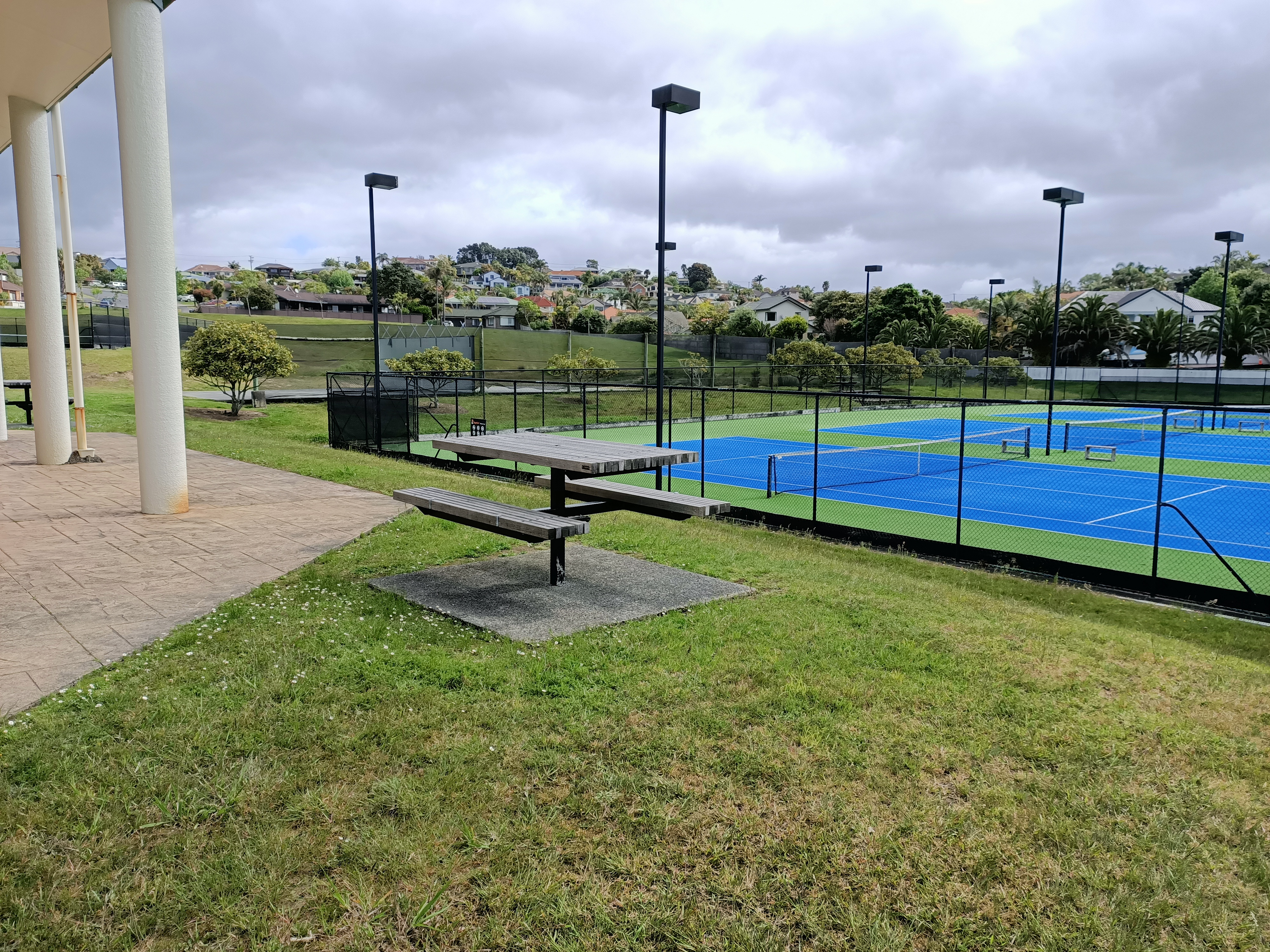
West Harbour Tennis Centre
