= Massey, New Zealand =

Massey
- Suburb
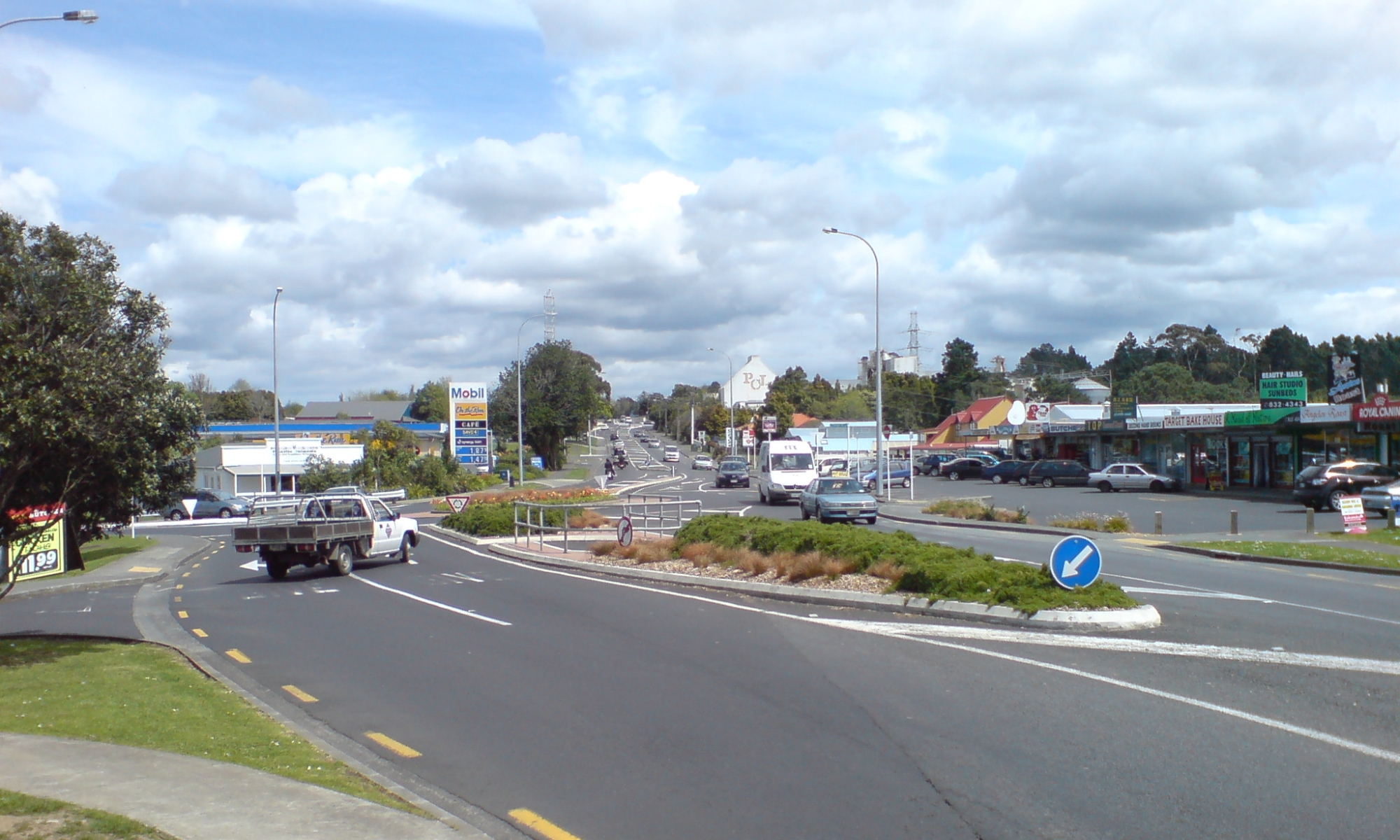
- The roundabout Don Buck Road / Triangle Road in Massey North.
- Interactive map of Massey
- Coordinates: 36.837583°S 174.617346°E
- Country: New Zealand
- City: Auckland
- Local authority: Auckland Council
- Electoral ward: Waitākere ward
- Local board: Henderson-Massey

Area
  - Land: 1,065 ha (2,630 acres)

Population (June 2025)
  - Total: 23,500
  - Density: 2,210/km^{2} (5,710/sq mi)
- Postcode: 0614

Kumeū	Westgate	West Harbour
Waitākere	Massey	Te Atatū Peninsula
Rānui	Lincoln	Lincoln

Massey is a northern suburb in West Auckland, New Zealand. It was formerly a northern suburb of Waitakere City, which existed from 1989 to 2010 before the city was amalgamated into Auckland Council. The suburb was named after former Prime Minister of New Zealand William Massey. Massey is a relatively large suburb and can be divided into three reasonably distinctive areas, Massey West, Massey East (separated by the north-western motorway) and Massey North (situated to the north of Royal Road). Parts of Massey East are also known as 'Royal Heights', which is home to the Royal Heights shopping centre.

The suburb features the Massey YMCA Leisure Centre, Library. The Westgate Shopping Centre on Hobsonville Road next to the north-western motorway and NorthWest Shopping Centre (which opened in October, 2015) to the north of Hobsonville Road are north of Massey.

== History ==
The area is within the traditional rohe of Te Kawerau ā Maki, and is the location of Pukewhakataratara, a mountain known as Redhill to European settlers. The literal translation of the name is "hill that poses a challenge or obstacle". In pre-European times, the bush-covered hill was a natural obstacle for people attempting to access the Waitākere Ranges from the Waitematā Harbour. The area was a part of the walking routes connecting the settlements of the Upper Waitematā Harbour, Waitākere River Valley to other areas of West Auckland and the Tāmaki isthmus.

European settlement of the area dates to the 1840s with timber milling, farming, and gum digging being the main sources of income.

The area was purchased by the Crown for European settlers in August 1853, as a part of the Mangatoetoe Block. The first known settlers on record were the Nicolas family, who were awarded a government land grant in 1882. The area was originally named Lawsonville, and was the site of the Birdwood Estate. From the 1890s until the early 1910s, the south-west Massey area was known for the camp of Don Buck, a Portuguese immigrant to New Zealand who employed ex-convicts in the gum digging trade. The area was renamed Massey circa 1915, in honour of Prime Minister William Massey.

The area experienced growth in the 1960s, after the Poultrymen's Association opened a branch in Massey in June 1960. Most of Massey was developed during the 1970s and 1980s.

== Demographics ==
Massey covers 10.65 km^{2} (4.11 sq mi) and had an estimated population of 23,500 as of June 2025, with a population density of 3,264 people per km^{2}.

Historical population
Year	Pop.	±% p.a.
2006	14,433	—
2013	16,131	+1.60%
2018	17,823	+2.01%
2023	19,851	+2.18%
The 2006 population is for a smaller area of 7.20 km^{2}, excluding Massey Red Hills, which was then included in Waitakere and Taupaki statistical areas Source:

Massey had a population of 19,851 in the 2023 New Zealand census, an increase of 2,028 people (11.4%) since the 2018 census, and an increase of 3,720 people (23.1%) since the 2013 census. There were 10,002 males, 9,771 females and 75 people of other genders in 5,919 dwellings. 3.3% of people identified as LGBTIQ+. There were 4,335 people (21.8%) aged under 15 years, 4,560 (23.0%) aged 15 to 29, 9,270 (46.7%) aged 30 to 64, and 1,695 (8.5%) aged 65 or older.

People could identify as more than one ethnicity. The results were 40.9% European (Pākehā); 19.1% Māori; 23.7% Pasifika; 32.6% Asian; 2.7% Middle Eastern, Latin American and African New Zealanders (MELAA); and 1.8% other, which includes people giving their ethnicity as "New Zealander". English was spoken by 90.8%, Māori language by 4.1%, Samoan by 5.6%, and other languages by 29.2%. No language could be spoken by 3.3% (e.g. too young to talk). New Zealand Sign Language was known by 0.4%. The percentage of people born overseas was 40.8, compared with 28.8% nationally.

Religious affiliations were 37.2% Christian, 6.3% Hindu, 3.3% Islam, 1.3% Māori religious beliefs, 1.6% Buddhist, 0.4% New Age, 0.1% Jewish, and 1.8% other religions. People who answered that they had no religion were 42.0%, and 6.1% of people did not answer the census question.

Of those at least 15 years old, 2,946 (19.0%) people had a bachelor's or higher degree, 7,161 (46.2%) had a post-high school certificate or diploma, and 4,734 (30.5%) people exclusively held high school qualifications. 1,428 people (9.2%) earned over $100,000 compared to 12.1% nationally. The employment status of those at least 15 was that 8,754 (56.4%) people were employed full-time, 1,632 (10.5%) were part-time, and 666 (4.3%) were unemployed.

Individual statistical areas
Name	Area (km^{2})	Population	Density (per km^{2})	Dwellings	Median age	Median income
Massey Red Hills	3.44	312	91	108	32.3 years	$54,600
Westgate South	1.71	3,042	1,779	990	32.9 years	$50,300
Massey Central	0.88	3,222	3,661	951	32.2 years	$42,400
Massey Royal Road West	0.90	3,108	3,453	924	32.8 years	$41,500
Massey West	1.40	2,814	2,010	822	32.2 years	$44,900
Massey Keegan	1.15	3,672	3,193	1,032	31.7 years	$41,200
Massey South	1.17	3,681	3,146	1,092	32.3 years	$42,900
New Zealand					38.1 years	$41,500

== Education ==
Massey is home to one secondary school, Massey High School, where the principal is former Tall Blacks captain Glen Denham as well as several primary schools, including Lincoln Heights School, Royal Road Primary School, Massey Primary School and Don Buck Primary School. Massey Primary School was the first school in the district, opening in 1925. Massey is not home to Massey University, which is based in Palmerston North with its Auckland campus at Albany.

== Governance ==
In New Zealand's national Parliament, Massey is represented by Member for Upper Harbour, National MP Paula Bennett who won the electorate in 2014 and 2017. As of the 2017 election no other MP who contested the Upper Harbour electorate has been represented in parliament as a list MP. Prior to changes in electorate boundaries, Massey fell within the Te Atatū electorate and was represented in 2011 by Member for Te Atatū, Labour MP Phil Twyford.

In terms of regional governance, Massey falls within the Waitākere ward and subsequently under the Henderson-Massey Local Board area of the Auckland City council. The Henderson-Massey local board area covers the suburbs of West Harbour, Massey, Ranui, Te Atatū Peninsula, Te Atatū South, Lincoln, Henderson, Western Heights, Glendene, and Sunnyvale and contained a population of 107,685 in the 2013 census. Previously Massey fell under the Massey Ward which contained the suburbs of Whenuapai, Hobsonville, Herald Island, West Harbour, Massey, Ranui, and Henderson North.

== Sport ==
The local rugby club is a member of the North Harbour Rugby Union and won the championship 6 times (1993, 2004, 2005, 2013, 2015 and 2016). Former All Black Jonah Lomu signed to play for Massey in 2005, but due to an injury was unable to play for them that season. He did however eventually make his debut for the club in 2006.

== Notable people ==
Massey is home to rugby players George Pisi and Tusi Pisi (North Harbour, Samoa and New Zealand 7's) as well as the musicians Blindspott.

== Parks ==
Moire Park is a 37.4 ha (92 acres) park that is bounded on the east by Lawsons Creek, the Manutewhau Stream to the north, and its namesake Moire Road to the west. It is one of the main sporting areas for the Waitakere City area with club facilities and several fields. Part of the park is covered in bush and this area is a protected natural area. The name Moire comes from the Colwill family, who settled the nearby area in 1907.
