= McLaren Park =

McLaren Park may refer to:

- John McLaren Park in San Francisco, California, United States
- McLaren Park, New Zealand, an Auckland, New Zealand, suburb
