= Waitakere Hospital =

General hospital in the Auckland Region

Coordinates: 36.869772°S 174.629901°E

- Te Whanu Ora
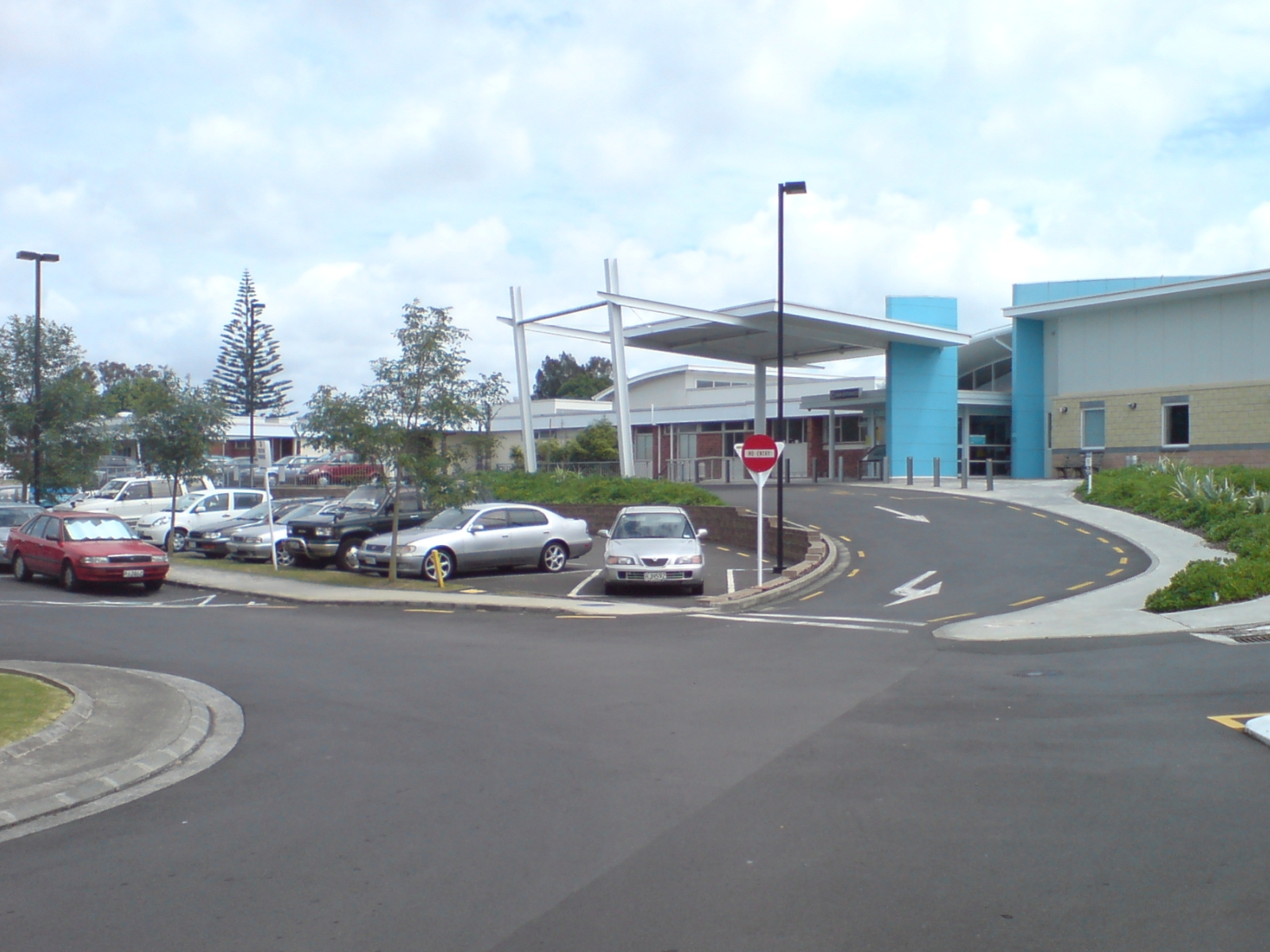
- The entry area of the hospital.

Geography
- Location: Henderson/Lincoln, West Auckland, New Zealand.

Services
- Emergency department: Yes
- Beds: 392

History
- Founded: 1945

Links
- Website: www.waitematadhb.govt.nz
- Other links: List of hospitals in New Zealand

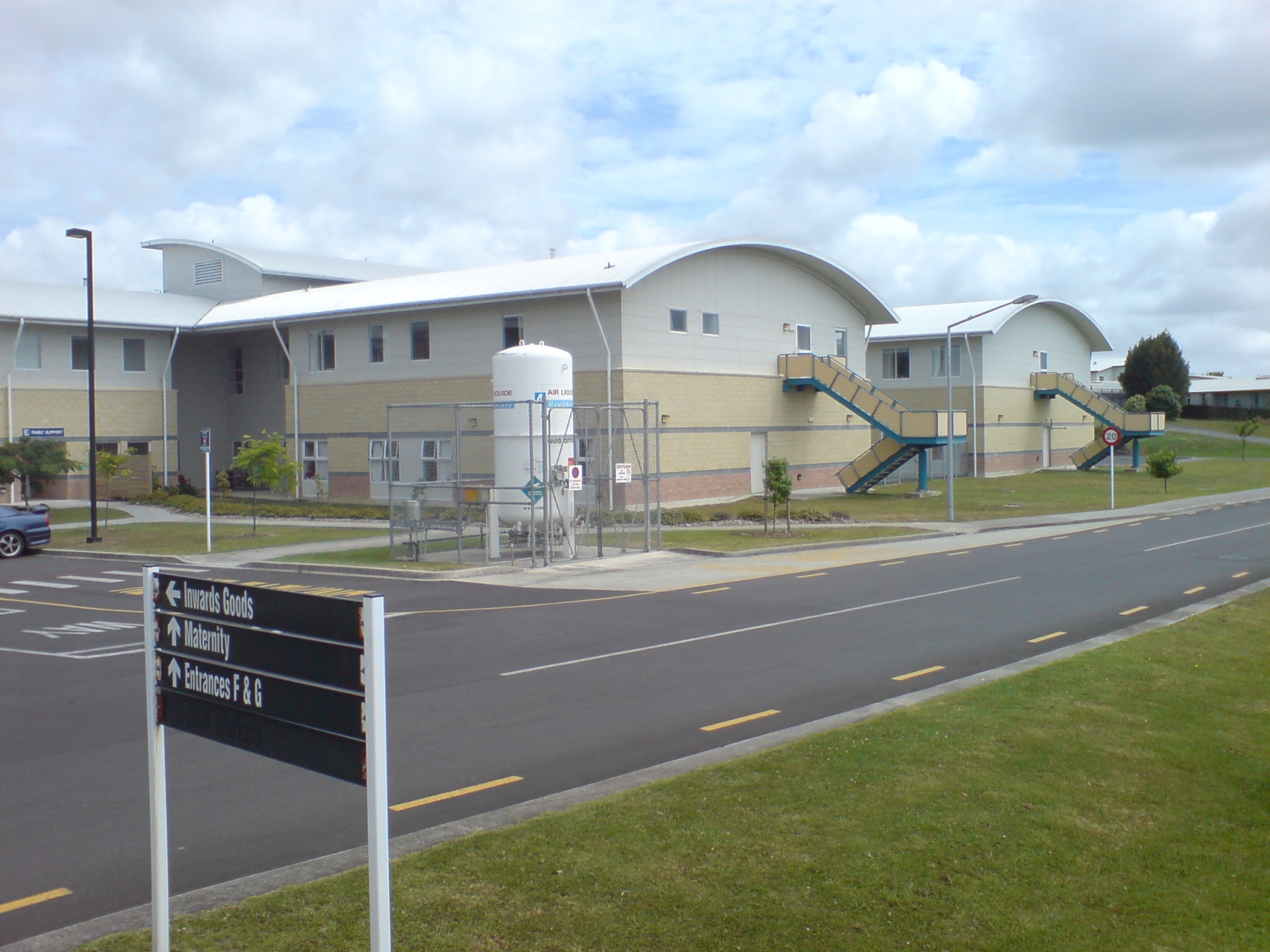
Some eastern-side buildings.

Waitakere Hospital is a general hospital located in the Henderson/Lincoln area of the New Zealand city of Auckland. It is administered by Te Whatu Ora and provides health services to residents in the North Shore, Waitakere and Rodney districts of Auckland. It has 392 beds, including coronary care beds, a maternity unit and a surgical unit with 3 operating theatres. The hospital's Emergency Department is open to both adult and paediatric patients 24 hours a day, seven days a week.

== History ==
In 1945 the original Waitakere Maternity Hospital was a small building in Te Atatū. The idea of a new hospital was raised that year, but it was another ten years before a site was found for the ‘North Western Hospital’. In the ensuing years a geriatric block was built and the site also became a base for community home health and support services, child disability services and for health services to school children - public health nurses, hearing and vision testing, school dental services.

HealthWest, a private primary health provider, was as of 2006 in negotiations with the hospital to be allowed to provide fee-paying patients with medical services in the hospital. While this proposed measure did not go forward as of mid-2007, it highlighted the fact that even after the NZ$60 million upgrading to general hospital status, the facility was still facing shortages, like many other public health facilities in New Zealand. In the first five months of 2008, the emergency department of the hospital was forced into partial closure 52 times, and was not open as a 24/7 emergency facility. This is being blamed on short-staffing and financial constraints of the Waitematā District Health Board.

In 2017, Waitākere Hospital's $9.8 million emergency care centre expansion was opened by Health Minister Jonathan Coleman. The 1,800 m^{2} extension was designed to alleviate the strain on the overcrowded emergency department, which nearly doubled in annual patients from 28,000 in 2009 to almost 52,000 in 2016. The extension added an improved entranceway, modern large waiting room, four ambulance drop-off bays, three resuscitation (resus) bays, new acute bays, paediatric care facilities, and psychiatric/behavioural health facilities. The new emergency department also included rooms for minor procedures such as plasters for fractures.

== Facilities ==
Waitākere Hospital is a medium-sized secondary-level hospital. Collaboration takes place between Waitākere and the larger North Shore Hospital, also located in the Waitematā District Health Board. Waitākere Hospital includes an emergency department (ED), called the emergency care centre (ECC), where acute patients present either as a walk-in, ambulance, or general practitioner (GP) referral. Another important unit in the hospital is the assessment and diagnostic unit (ADU), which acts as a gateway between the ED and the wards. Patients often spend a night in the ADU before they are taken to the ward. The ADU is a short-stay unit, with a maximum stay time of 36 hours, before patients are discharged or transferred. There are seven adult general medical wards: Te Henga, Piha, Anawhata, Titirangi, Wainamu, Huia, and Muriwai, named after local beaches or towns. Huia ward also functions as the hospital's cardiology ward and coronary care unit. There is also one paediatric ward, called Rangatira. The hospital includes a special care baby unit and a maternity unit, along with a surgical unit that includes one dedicated obstetrics operating theatre.

Ground floor:

- Emergency care centre
- Assessment diagnostic unit
- Radiology
- Surgical unit
- Child health
- Special care baby unit
- Medical day stay
- Cardiology procedures
- Outpatient clinics
- Flex ward
- Wards: Te Henga, Piha, Anawhata, Titirangi, Rangatira (paediatric)

Lower ground floor:

- Older adult health services
- Therapies
- Wards: Muriwai, Wainamu, Huia (cardiology)
