= Rānui =

- Suburb
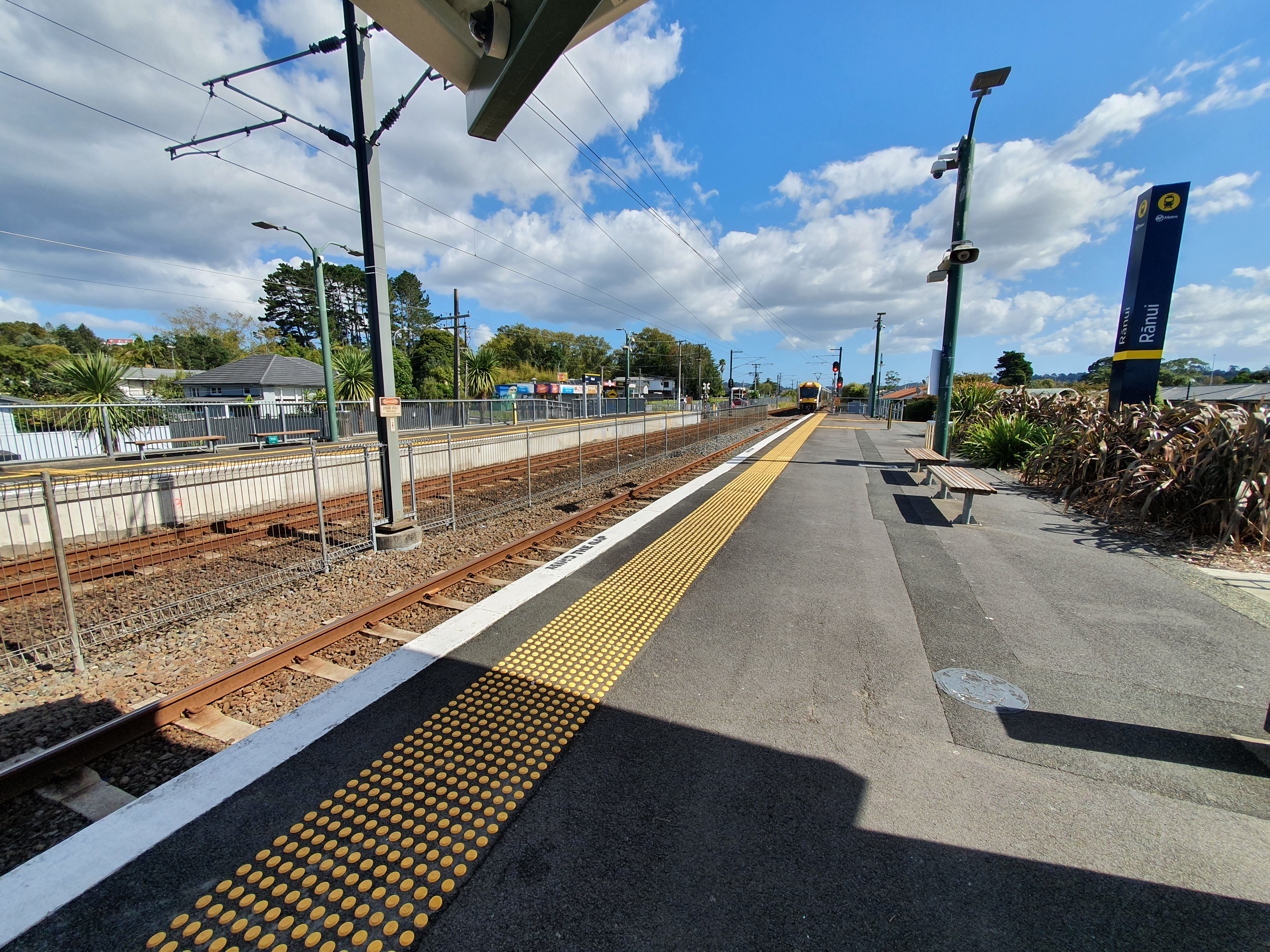
- Rānui railway station and surrounding houses
- Interactive map of Rānui
- Coordinates: 36.864°S 174.602°E
- Country: New Zealand
- City: Auckland
- Local authority: Auckland Council
- Electoral ward: Waitākere Ward
- Local board: Waitākere Ranges Local Board; Henderson-Massey Local Board

Area
  - Land: 982 ha (2,430 acres)

Population (June 2025)
  - Total: 15,650
  - Density: 1,590/km^{2} (4,130/sq mi)
- Train stations: Rānui railway station

Waitakere	Massey	Massey
Swanson	Rānui	Lincoln
Waiatarua	Western Heights	Henderson

Rānui is a suburb of West Auckland, New Zealand, which is under the local governance of Auckland Council. The area is densely populated but close to the western fringe of the Auckland urban area.

The word 'rānui' in Māori means 'midday'.

== Demographics ==
Rānui covers 9.82 km^{2} (3.79 sq mi) and had an estimated population of 15,650 as of June 2025, with a population density of 1,594 people per km^{2}.

Historical population
Year	Pop.	±% p.a.
2006	10,836	—
2013	12,030	+1.50%
2018	13,872	+2.89%
2023	14,190	+0.45%
Source: The 2006 population is for a smaller area of 9.53 km^{2}.

Rānui (Auckland) had a population of 14,190 in the 2023 New Zealand census, an increase of 318 people (2.3%) since the 2018 census, and an increase of 2,160 people (18.0%) since the 2013 census. There were 7,005 males, 7,143 females and 42 people of other genders in 4,053 dwellings. 3.1% of people identified as LGBTIQ+. There were 3,273 people (23.1%) aged under 15 years, 3,180 (22.4%) aged 15 to 29, 6,411 (45.2%) aged 30 to 64, and 1,329 (9.4%) aged 65 or older.

People could identify as more than one ethnicity. The results were 37.7% European (Pākehā); 21.3% Māori; 26.5% Pasifika; 30.3% Asian; 3.0% Middle Eastern, Latin American and African New Zealanders (MELAA); and 1.7% other, which includes people giving their ethnicity as "New Zealander". English was spoken by 91.8%, Māori language by 5.1%, Samoan by 8.4%, and other languages by 28.1%. No language could be spoken by 2.6% (e.g. too young to talk). New Zealand Sign Language was known by 0.6%. The percentage of people born overseas was 38.9, compared with 28.8% nationally.

Religious affiliations were 37.8% Christian, 7.0% Hindu, 4.3% Islam, 1.5% Māori religious beliefs, 1.5% Buddhist, 0.3% New Age, 0.1% Jewish, and 2.0% other religions. People who answered that they had no religion were 39.5%, and 6.2% of people did not answer the census question.

Of those at least 15 years old, 1,881 (17.2%) people had a bachelor's or higher degree, 5,046 (46.2%) had a post-high school certificate or diploma, and 3,552 (32.5%) people exclusively held high school qualifications. 822 people (7.5%) earned over $100,000 compared to 12.1% nationally. The employment status of those at least 15 was that 5,568 (51.0%) people were employed full-time, 1,209 (11.1%) were part-time, and 549 (5.0%) were unemployed.

Individual statistical areas
Name	Area (km^{2})	Population	Density (per km^{2})	Dwellings	Median age	Median income
Birdwood West	6.24	819	131	261	40.3 years	$50,400
Rānui North	1.03	3,855	3,743	1,119	31.4 years	$36,200
Rānui Domain	0.87	3,588	4,124	1,038	33.3 years	$34,200
Rānui South West	0.74	2,994	4,046	834	31.6 years	$43,200
Rānui South East	0.94	2,931	3,118	801	32.5 years	$38,800
New Zealand					38.1 years	$41,500

== Education ==
Rānui School is a contributing primary (years 1–6) school with a roll of 412 students. The school's bilingual unit, Whakatipu Kakano, teaches some students in Māori.

Birdwood School is a full primary (years 1–8) school with a roll of 266 students. Birdwood also has a bilingual unit, Te Puawaitanga o Te Reo, which teaches a quarter of the students in Māori.

Te Kura Kaupapa Māori o Te Kotuku is a full primary (years 1–8) school which teaches primarily in Māori. It has a roll of 134 students.

All schools are coeducational. Rolls are as at October 2025. Rānui and Birdwood schools have a high proportion of Māori and Pacific Island students. Te Kura Kaupapa Māori o Te Kotuku has an entirely Māori student population.
