= Henderson, New Zealand =

Henderson
- Suburb
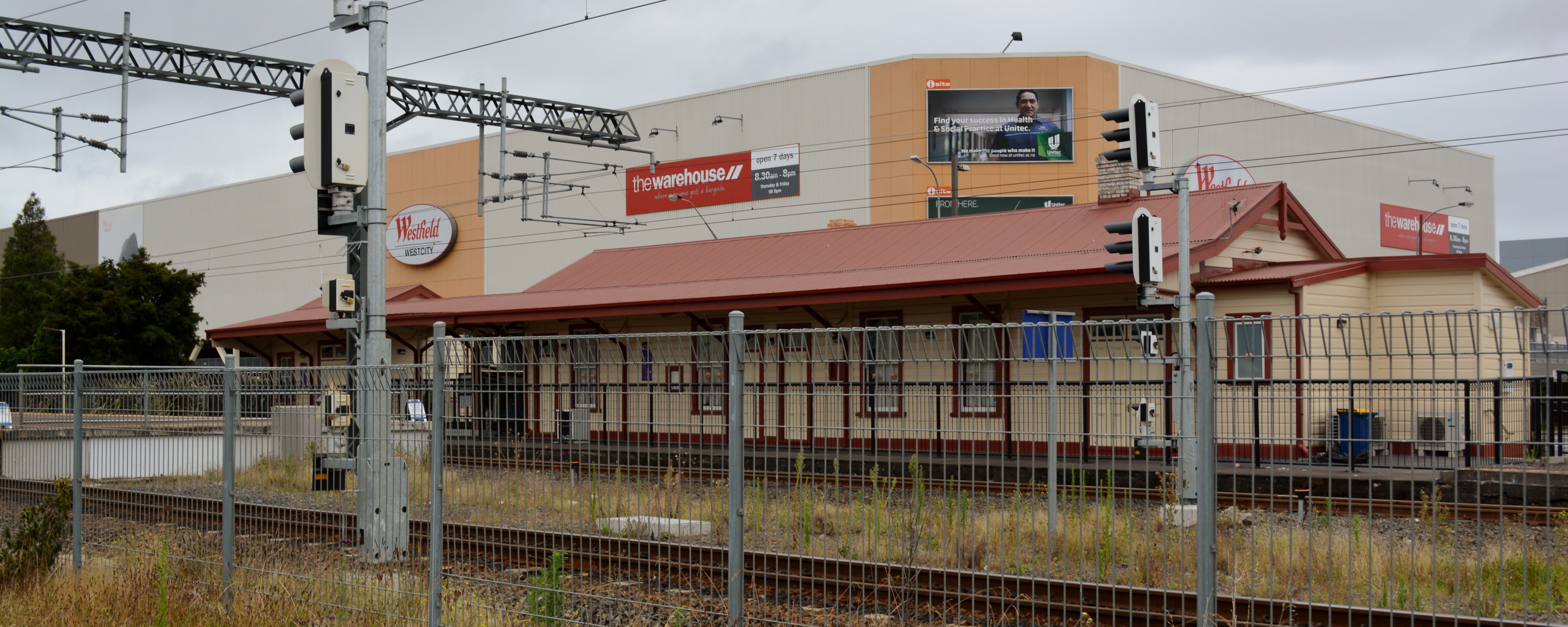
- The old Henderson railway station with WestCity Waitakere in the background
- Interactive map of Henderson
- Coordinates: 36.8811°S 174.6312°E
- Country: New Zealand
- City: Auckland
- Local authority: Auckland Council
- Electoral ward: Waitākere ward
- Local board: Henderson-Massey
- Established: 1844

Area
  - Land: 665 ha (1,640 acres)

Population (June 2025)
  - Total: 18,370
  - Density: 2,760/km^{2} (7,150/sq mi)
- Train stations: Henderson Railway Station; Sturges Road Railway Station
- Hospitals: Waitakere Hospital

Rānui	Lincoln	Te Atatū South
Western Heights	Henderson	Te Atatū South
McLaren Park	Sunnyvale	Glendene

Henderson (Note: (Māori: Te Kōpua or Māori: Ōpanuku)) is a suburb of West Auckland, New Zealand. It is 13 kilometres (8.1 mi) west of Auckland city centre, and two kilometres (1.2 mi) west of the Whau River, a southwestern arm of the Waitematā Harbour.

Henderson initially developed around the mill of Thomas Henderson and was known as Henderson's Mill. As it expanded it became known as just Henderson and later it became an independent borough. As part of the 1989 local government reforms it became the centre of Waitakere City until Waitakere City was amalgamated to form the new Auckland Council.

== Geography ==
Henderson is located between the Waitākere Ranges to the west, and the Te Atatū Peninsula in the east. The area is within the catchment of Te Wai-o-Pareira / Henderson Creek, an estuarial arm of the Waitematā Harbour. The Ōpanuku, Oratia, Swanson, Momutu and Paremuka streams meet at Te Wai-o-Pareira / Henderson Creek, to the north of Henderson.

Between 3 and 5 million years ago, tectonic forces uplifted the Waitākere Ranges and central Auckland, while subsiding the Manukau and inner Waitematā harbours. The land at Henderson is formed from Waitemata Group sandstone, which was previously found at the bottom of a deep sedimentary basin. Land close to Te Wai-o-Pareira / Henderson Creek and the Waitematā Harbour are formed from rhyolitic clays and peat, formed from eroding soil and interactions with the harbour. Prior to human contact, the Henderson area was home to broadleaf forests, dominated by pūriri, karaka, kohekohe and māhoe trees. The alluvial creek/harbour zone was favoured by kahikatea, pukatea and rātā, with tī kōuka (cabbage trees) flourishing in wetter sites.

=== Climate ===
Climate data for Henderson North (7m, 1991–2020 normals, extremes 1985–present)
Month	Jan	Feb	Mar	Apr	May	Jun	Jul	Aug	Sep	Oct	Nov	Dec	Year
Record high °C (°F)	31.8 (89.2)	34.0 (93.2)	30.1 (86.2)	29.4 (84.9)	24.1 (75.4)	24.5 (76.1)	20.9 (69.6)	25.5 (77.9)	27.0 (80.6)	26.0 (78.8)	28.4 (83.1)	30.8 (87.4)	34.0 (93.2)
Mean maximum °C (°F)	29.3 (84.7)	29.3 (84.7)	27.8 (82.0)	25.9 (78.6)	22.4 (72.3)	19.7 (67.5)	18.7 (65.7)	19.6 (67.3)	21.4 (70.5)	23.5 (74.3)	25.4 (77.7)	27.8 (82.0)	30.1 (86.2)
Mean daily maximum °C (°F)	25.5 (77.9)	25.9 (78.6)	24.2 (75.6)	21.5 (70.7)	18.7 (65.7)	16.2 (61.2)	15.5 (59.9)	16.3 (61.3)	17.9 (64.2)	19.4 (66.9)	21.3 (70.3)	23.5 (74.3)	20.5 (68.9)
Daily mean °C (°F)	19.9 (67.8)	20.3 (68.5)	18.6 (65.5)	16.2 (61.2)	13.8 (56.8)	11.5 (52.7)	10.6 (51.1)	11.3 (52.3)	12.9 (55.2)	14.5 (58.1)	16.2 (61.2)	18.5 (65.3)	15.4 (59.6)
Mean daily minimum °C (°F)	14.4 (57.9)	14.8 (58.6)	13.0 (55.4)	10.9 (51.6)	8.9 (48.0)	6.8 (44.2)	5.6 (42.1)	6.3 (43.3)	7.9 (46.2)	9.6 (49.3)	11.2 (52.2)	13.4 (56.1)	10.2 (50.4)
Mean minimum °C (°F)	8.8 (47.8)	9.5 (49.1)	7.4 (45.3)	4.3 (39.7)	1.9 (35.4)	−0.4 (31.3)	−1.4 (29.5)	0.0 (32.0)	1.3 (34.3)	3.5 (38.3)	5.2 (41.4)	7.6 (45.7)	−2.0 (28.4)
Record low °C (°F)	5.6 (42.1)	4.9 (40.8)	2.3 (36.1)	−1.0 (30.2)	−2.3 (27.9)	−4.3 (24.3)	−4.1 (24.6)	−2.3 (27.9)	−1.5 (29.3)	0.2 (32.4)	2.5 (36.5)	4.4 (39.9)	−4.3 (24.3)
Average rainfall mm (inches)	70.7 (2.78)	74.1 (2.92)	90.7 (3.57)	110.4 (4.35)	140.3 (5.52)	158.5 (6.24)	178.3 (7.02)	151.5 (5.96)	133.0 (5.24)	103.8 (4.09)	88.7 (3.49)	99.4 (3.91)	1,399.4 (55.09)
Source: NIWA

== History ==
Henderson is in the traditional rohe of Te Kawerau ā Maki, and the name Ōpanuku refers to the Ōpanuku Stream, traditionally known as Te Wai-ō-Panuku ("The Stream of Panuku"), Panuku being the name of one of the earliest Te Kawerau ā Maki ancestors. The lower Opanuku Stream area was called Waitaro, referring to the taro cultivations grown there.

The point where the Opanuku and Oratia Streams meet (the Tui Glen Reserve / Falls Park area) is the beginning of Te Wai-o-Pareira, also known as the Henderson Creek, and the point where the creek became navigable by waka. This point was strategically important to Te Kawerau ā Maki, and was the location of a small fortified pā known as Te Kōpua. Kōpūpāka was the name of a kāinga close to Te Kōpua, which was used as a temporary settlement by Ngāti Whātua during the Musket Wars in the 1820s, during a brief lull in conflict. After the Musket Wars, Te Kawerau ā Maki returned to the area in the 1830s, and most members chose to settle close to a defensive pā at Te Henga / Bethells Beach.

Henderson is named after early colonial settler Thomas Henderson, a Scottish immigrant who purchased land from Ngati Whatua in 1844 and established a timber mill on the banks of Te Wai-o-Pareira / Henderson Creek ca. 1847 to process the logs of kauri trees which were cut from the Henderson Valley and further upstream, from the eastern flanks of the Waitākere Ranges. The community which developed around the mill was known as Henderson's Mill, and later the Henderson's Mill Settlement. The first European settlers in the community were mill workers, who were joined gum diggers, farm workers and brick makers. In 1855, George Pirrit and his son William Pirrit bought land at Henderson adjacent to the Oratia Stream, which they dammed in order to operate a water turbine, manufacturing iron heel and toe plates for boots. In the following year, a hotel was opened on the town's main street.

The mill closed in the latter 1860s, and in 1875 the area was hit by a major flood, damaging crops and bridges near the settlement. The area became more prosperous in the 1880s, after the North Auckland Railway opened between Auckland and Helensville. When the Henderson railway station was opened, the name was displayed as Henderson Mill, with the possessive dropped. Overtime, goods to the area sent by rail began adopting this name, and eventually the settlement was referred to as Henderson. In the late 19th and early 20th centuries, Henderson was the location of a number of brick and pottery yards adjacent to Te Wai-o-Pareira / Henderson Creek. The major brick industries in West Auckland were located to the south, along the Whau River. In 1896, a community hall was built at Henderson, hosting concerts for the West Auckland area. This was destroyed by fire in 1924, and rebuilt in brick.

In 1907, Lebanese New Zealander Assid Abraham Corban developed a vineyard at Henderson. After the sale of alcohol was prohibited in Henderson during the temperance movement, Corban set up a depot at the border of the prohibition area on the eastern side of the railway tracks, in order to sell his projects.

By the 1920s, the Lincoln Road, Swanson Road and Sturgess Road areas had developed into orchards run primarily by Dalmatian families who immigrated to New Zealand, including the included Bilich (later White), Babich, Boric, Yelavich and Fredatovich families. During this time, the Te Wai-o-Pareira / Henderson Creek at Tui Glen Reserve had become a popular waterway for leisure and a site for pleasure boating. The first modern brick block of shops were built in the area in 1932. In the early 1930s, a kauri gum refinery was constructed on Station Road, however this closed down in 1936 after a market slump.

== Notable people ==
- Lucy May Cranwell FRSNZ (1907–2000), botanist responsible for groundbreaking work in palynology

== Amenities and attractions ==
Henderson features a large shopping centre, WestCity Waitakere, with numerous other shops and large stores also located in the area. The West Wave Pool and Leisure Centre, owned by the Auckland Council, was built to host the Aquatics at the 1990 Commonwealth Games.

The Corban's Wine Estate and Corban Estate Arts Centre are both located in Henderson. The annual InterACT Disability Arts Festival is held at the gallery. At the northern end of Henderson, near the Lincoln Road motorway interchange, the Toroa, a historic ferry under restoration, is a well-known local landmark.

The Trusts Stadium attracts hundreds of thousands of visitors a year, hosting a range of events, including concerts, sporting events and community gatherings. The Trusts Stadium was completed in August 2004 and was opened by then Prime Minister Helen Clark the following month. It cost $28 million to complete but opened debt-free, with The Trusts providing $5 million, Waitakere City Council contributing $12.5 million and ASB Charitable Trusts providing $4.5 million.

Falls Hotel is a historic hotel located in Falls Park along Alderman Drive. It currently hosts a café and restaurant.

== Demographics ==
Henderson covers 6.65 km^{2} (2.57 sq mi) and had an estimated population of 20,460 as of June 2025, with a population density of 3,077 people per km^{2}.

Historical population
Year	Pop.	±% p.a.
2006	7,029	—
2013	14,133	+10.49%
2018	15,663	+2.08%
2023	16,503	+1.05%
The 2006 population is for a smaller area of 4.36 km^{2}. Source:

Henderson had a population of 16,503 in the 2023 New Zealand census, an increase of 840 people (5.4%) since the 2018 census, and an increase of 2,370 people (16.8%) since the 2013 census. There were 8,016 males, 8,430 females and 60 people of other genders in 5,679 dwellings. 3.4% of people identified as LGBTIQ+. There were 3,204 people (19.4%) aged under 15 years, 3,228 (19.6%) aged 15 to 29, 7,473 (45.3%) aged 30 to 64, and 2,589 (15.7%) aged 65 or older.

People could identify as more than one ethnicity. The results were 42.5% European (Pākehā); 17.7% Māori; 23.0% Pasifika; 31.4% Asian; 2.9% Middle Eastern, Latin American and African New Zealanders (MELAA); and 2.0% other, which includes people giving their ethnicity as "New Zealander". English was spoken by 90.9%, Māori language by 4.1%, Samoan by 7.7%, and other languages by 27.2%. No language could be spoken by 3.0% (e.g. too young to talk). New Zealand Sign Language was known by 0.6%. The percentage of people born overseas was 41.3, compared with 28.8% nationally.

Religious affiliations were 40.4% Christian, 5.7% Hindu, 3.3% Islam, 1.4% Māori religious beliefs, 1.7% Buddhist, 0.4% New Age, 0.1% Jewish, and 1.5% other religions. People who answered that they had no religion were 39.2%, and 6.5% of people did not answer the census question.

Of those at least 15 years old, 2,940 (22.1%) people had a bachelor's or higher degree, 5,889 (44.3%) had a post-high school certificate or diploma, and 4,458 (33.5%) people exclusively held high school qualifications. 921 people (6.9%) earned over $100,000 compared to 12.1% nationally. The employment status of those at least 15 was that 6,333 (47.6%) people were employed full-time, 1,338 (10.1%) were part-time, and 585 (4.4%) were unemployed.

Individual statistical areas
Name	Area (km^{2})	Population	Density (per km^{2})	Dwellings	Median age	Median income
Henderson North	0.59	2,109	3,575	744	36.5 years	$32,000
Henderson West	1.09	2,787	2,557	939	36.0 years	$38,600
Henderson Central	2.02	1,491	738	774	47.1 years	$29,000
Henderson Valley Park	0.97	2,910	3,000	795	32.2 years	$36,500
Henderson North East	0.80	2,709	3,386	942	38.3 years	$35,500
Henderson East	1.18	4,497	3,811	1,485	35.3 years	$40,300
New Zealand					38.1 years	$41,500

== Politics ==
=== Local government ===
From 1876 until 1946, Henderson was administered by the Waitemata County Council, a large rural county north and west of the city of Auckland. In 1922 Henderson was constituted a town district within the county. In 1946, the Henderson Borough was formed, 10 years later the borough expanded via annexing a small part of Waitemata County. In 1989, the borough was merged into the Waitakere City. Waitakere City Council was amalgamated into Auckland Council in November 2010.

Within the Auckland Council, Henderson is a part of the Henderson-Massey local government area governed by the Henderson-Massey Local Board. It is a part of the Waitākere ward, which elects two councillors to the Auckland Council.

==== List of borough mayors ====
- 1946–1956 William Gibb Blacklock
- 1956–1965 Frederick George William Wilsher
- 1965–1974 Reginald Alfred Keeling
- 1974–1989 Assid Khaleel Corban

=== Member of Parliament ===
The Local Member of Parliament for Henderson is Phil Twyford, the MP for Te Atatū, who keeps an office in the suburb.

== Education ==
The first school in Henderson began operating in 1873, held in the library of Henderson's Mill.

Henderson High School is a secondary (years 9–13) school with a roll of 1,048 students. The high school was founded in 1953. Waitākere College is a coeducational secondary (years 9–13) school with a roll of 1,988 students. It opened in 1975. Liston College and St Dominic's College are secondary (years 7–13) Catholic schools for boys and girls, respectively. They have rolls of 856 and 851 students.

Henderson Intermediate is a coeducational intermediate (years 7–8) school with a roll of 740 students. It opened in 1964.

Henderson School and Henderson South School are contributing primary (years 1–6) schools with rolls of 196 and 274 students, respectively. Henderson School was founded in 1873 and Henderson South School in 1967. Henderson North School is a coeducational contributing primary (years 1–6) school with a roll of 356 students. It celebrated its 50th jubilee in 2007.

Holy Cross School, a Catholic primary school, is a full primary (years 1–8) school with a roll of 439 students. It celebrated its 75th jubilee in 2007.

Rolls are as at July 2026.

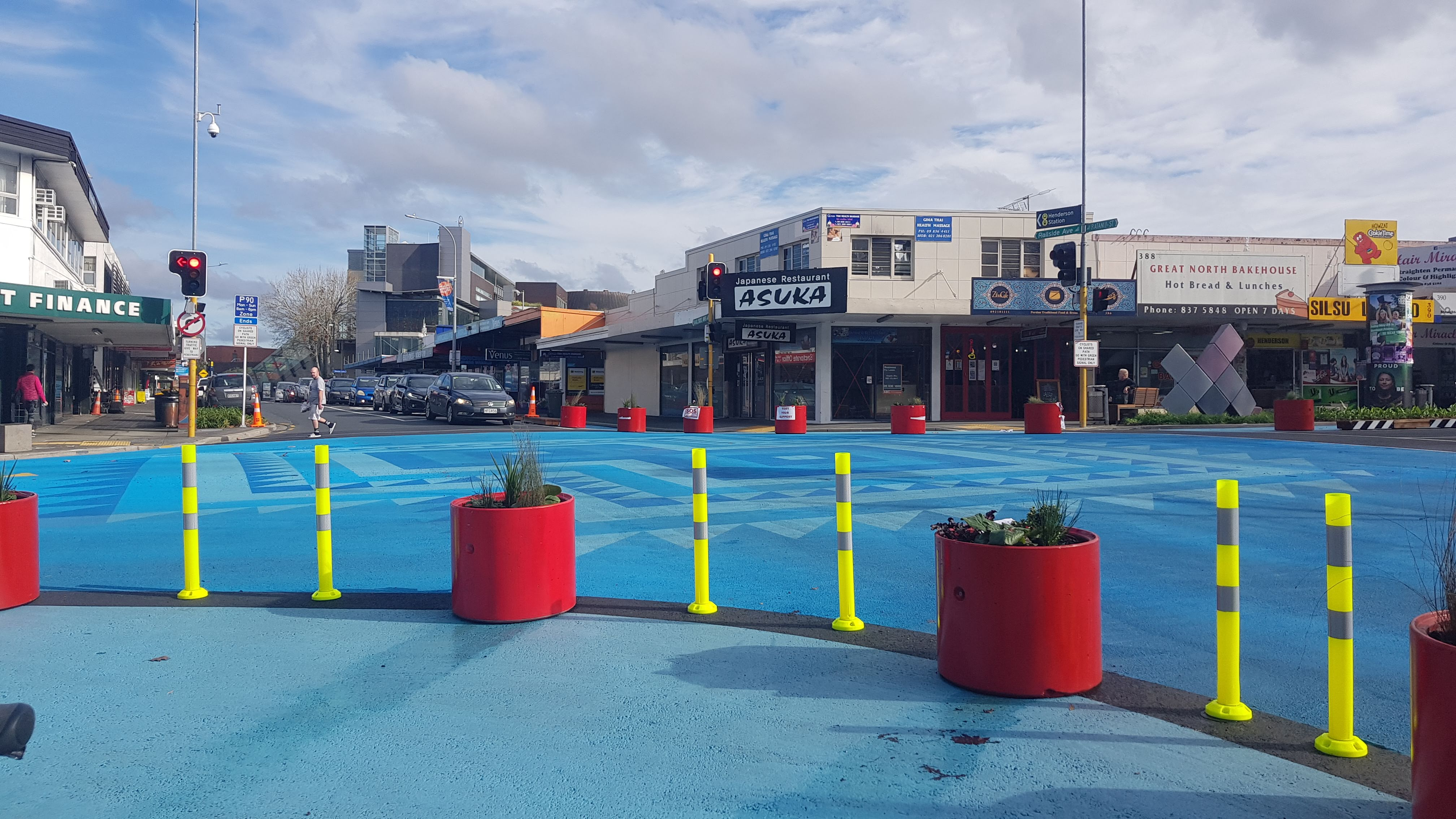
Henderson during the Eke Panuku Streets For People trial

== Transport ==
The East West Line runs through the suburb, with Henderson Railway Station being adjacent to the town centre. Henderson Railway Station is adjacent to the main shopping centre and a bus interchange. The suburb is also served by the Sturges Road Railway Station. Motorway access is provided via the interchange at Lincoln Road, in the adjacent suburb of Lincoln. The main walkways and cycleways of the Project Twin Streams go through the suburb.
