= InterACT Disability Arts Festival =

Three-day New Zealand event begun in 2011

The InterACT Disability Arts Festival is an annual three-day event which showcases the talents of disabled performers, authors, artists, and artisans in Auckland, New Zealand. The event has been described by the Minister for Disability Issues, Tariana Turia, as "a chance for people of all abilities to celebrate and share their talents with us all"

== History ==
The festival was inspired by the Awakenings Festival of Horsham, Victoria, Australia. It wasn't until five years after a visit to the 2007 Awakenings festival by three representatives of the Interacting Theatre Company, that the inaugural InterACT festival was held in Auckland, New Zealand.

The 2013 edition of the festival is scheduled for 23–25 October and the venue will be Corban's Estate Arts Centre, Henderson.

== See also ==
- Disability art
- Disability in the arts
