= Waitakere City =

Former territorial authority of New Zealand

Coordinates: 36°51′S 174°33′E

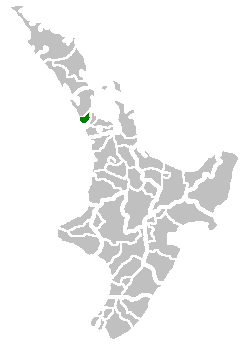
- Country: New Zealand

Area
  - Total: 367 km^{2} (142 sq mi)

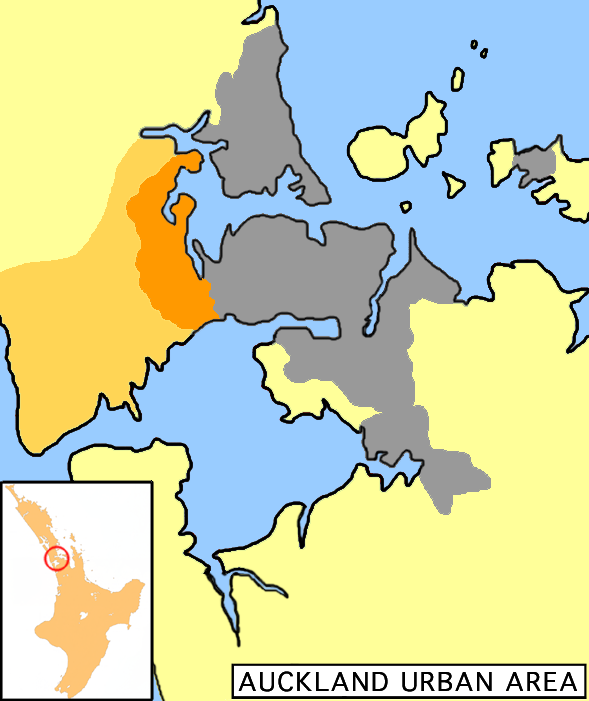
The darker orange shows the urban area within the (grey) greater Auckland conurbation.

Waitakere City was a territorial authority in West Auckland, New Zealand; it was governed by the Waitakere City Council from 1989 to 2010. It was New Zealand's fifth-largest city, with an annual growth of about 2%. In 2010 the council was amalgamated with the other authorities of the Auckland Region to form the current Auckland Council.

The name "Waitakere" comes from the Waitākere River in the Waitākere Ranges.

== History ==
Waitakere City was formed by the amalgamation of Waitemata City with the boroughs of Henderson, New Lynn, and Glen Eden in the 1989 nationwide re-organisation of local government. There were just two mayors of Waitakere City during its existence, Assid Corban (previously mayor of Henderson Borough) from 1989 to 1992, and Bob Harvey from 1992 to 2010.

In February 1993 the council developed the "Greenprint" as an Agenda 21 initiative and declared itself to be an eco-city.

On 1 November 2010, the Waitakere City Council was abolished and Waitakere City was merged into a single Auckland city governed by Auckland Council. All council facilities, assets and services were handed over to the new council.

=== Coat of arms ===
Coat of arms of Waitakere City
Notes Waitakere City adopted a coat of arms in 1989. The coat of arms of Waitakere City was originally granted on 30 October 1973 to the former Waitemata County Council, which became Waitemata City in 1974, then Waitakere City in 1989. Crest On a mural crown or masoned vert, an arm couped bendwise habited in a maunch sable bezanty each bezant charged with an ermine spot sable, cuffed ermine lined gules, the hand proper supporting an orb vert banded and ensigned with a cross crosslet or, mantled sable doubled or. Escutcheon Tierced per pall reversed azure, or and argent, on a chevron engrailed or and sable five ermine spots counterchanged, between in chief dexter a bunch of grapes slipped and leaved argent and sinister a tower gules, and in base a bulls head caboshed sable, armed and ringed or. Motto On the original grant, includes a motto in the Māori language: "Te Pai Me Te Whairawa", which translated means "The Goodness and the Wealth". Symbolism The grapes symbolise viticulture, a principal activity in the City. The bulls head denotes dairy farming in the region. The heraldic tower symbolises the growth of the City. The gold and black ermine spots symbolise the district's prosperity and revers the dignity of civic office. The robed hand holding an orb is a symbol of civic authority. The narrow cuff of natural ermine denotes that it is the sleeve of a robe of office.

== Administrative structure ==
The elected Council consisted of the mayor and 14 councillors representing the four wards. Each ward also had an elected community board that considered local issues.

== Geography, wards and suburbs ==
=== Henderson Ward ===
This urban ward contained the old Henderson borough as well as the suburbs of Glendene, Te Atatū South, and Te Atatū Peninsula (formerly Te Atatū North). There were 40,086 residents in 2001. It was located immediately to the west of Auckland city, some 10 kilometres from the city centre, along the western shores of the Waitematā Harbour and its southwestern arm, the Whau River.

=== Massey Ward ===
Although this area was principally urban, it also had some farms and lifestyle blocks in the north and west. The ward contained the suburbs of Whenuapai, Hobsonville, West Harbour, Massey, Ranui, and Henderson North. It had a population of 51,369 in the 2001 census. It was located to the north of the Henderson Ward, along the Waitemata's northwestern shore, and included one of New Zealand's largest concentrations of former military bases, with former large army and air force stations within the ward.

=== New Lynn Ward ===
Centred on the old boroughs of New Lynn and Glen Eden, it also contained the suburbs of Kelston, Green Bay, Titirangi, Kaurilands, Waima, and Woodlands Park. The ward had a population of 49,845 in 2001. New Lynn Ward was to the south of Henderson Ward, and extended to the shore of the Manukau Harbour at its southern end. New Lynn itself is 10 kilometres southwest of Auckland city centre.

=== Waitakere Ward ===
This ward was by far the largest in area as it encompassed the sparsely populated Waitākere Ranges, as well as some of the urban fringes as the city expanded westward into former orchards and farms. The population of 27,450 in 2001 was the smallest of the wards, but it was also the fastest growing. It encompassed the suburbs, villages and localities of Swanson, Henderson Valley, Sunnyvale, Oratia, Waiatarua, Laingholm, Parau, Cornwallis, Huia, Whatipu, Karekare, Piha, Anawhata, Bethells / Te Henga, and Waitakere township. Many of these had volunteer fire brigades to protect their communities from the summer bush fires. This ward lay to the west of the three other wards, and extended to the north as well. Its northern end, around Muriwai, was the furthest part of Waitakere from Auckland city centre, lying some 30 kilometres to the northwest of it.

== Mayors ==
The mayor was directly elected across the whole city council area using a First Past the Post electoral system. Each electoral term was for three years. The final mayor was Bob Harvey.

=== List of mayors of Waitakere City ===
#	Image	Name	In office	Terms	Notes
1		Assid Corban	1989–1992	1	
2		Bob Harvey	1992–2010	6	

== Industry ==
The two major commercial centres of Waitakere City were Henderson and New Lynn. Waitakere City's workforce was strongly oriented towards Auckland City, with about 40% of all workers living in the city commuting into the Auckland City area for work from the late 2000s.

== Sister cities ==
- (United States) Huntington Beach, California, US
- Kakogawa, Japan
- Ningbo, China
- (Republic of Ireland) Galway, Ireland
- Amritsar, India

== See also ==
- List of regions in New Zealand
- Territorial Authorities of New Zealand.
