= Henderson-Massey Local Board =

Coordinates: 36.88036°S 174.63043°E

Henderson-Massey Local Board Te Poari ā-Rohe o Henderson-Massey
- Local board of Auckland Council
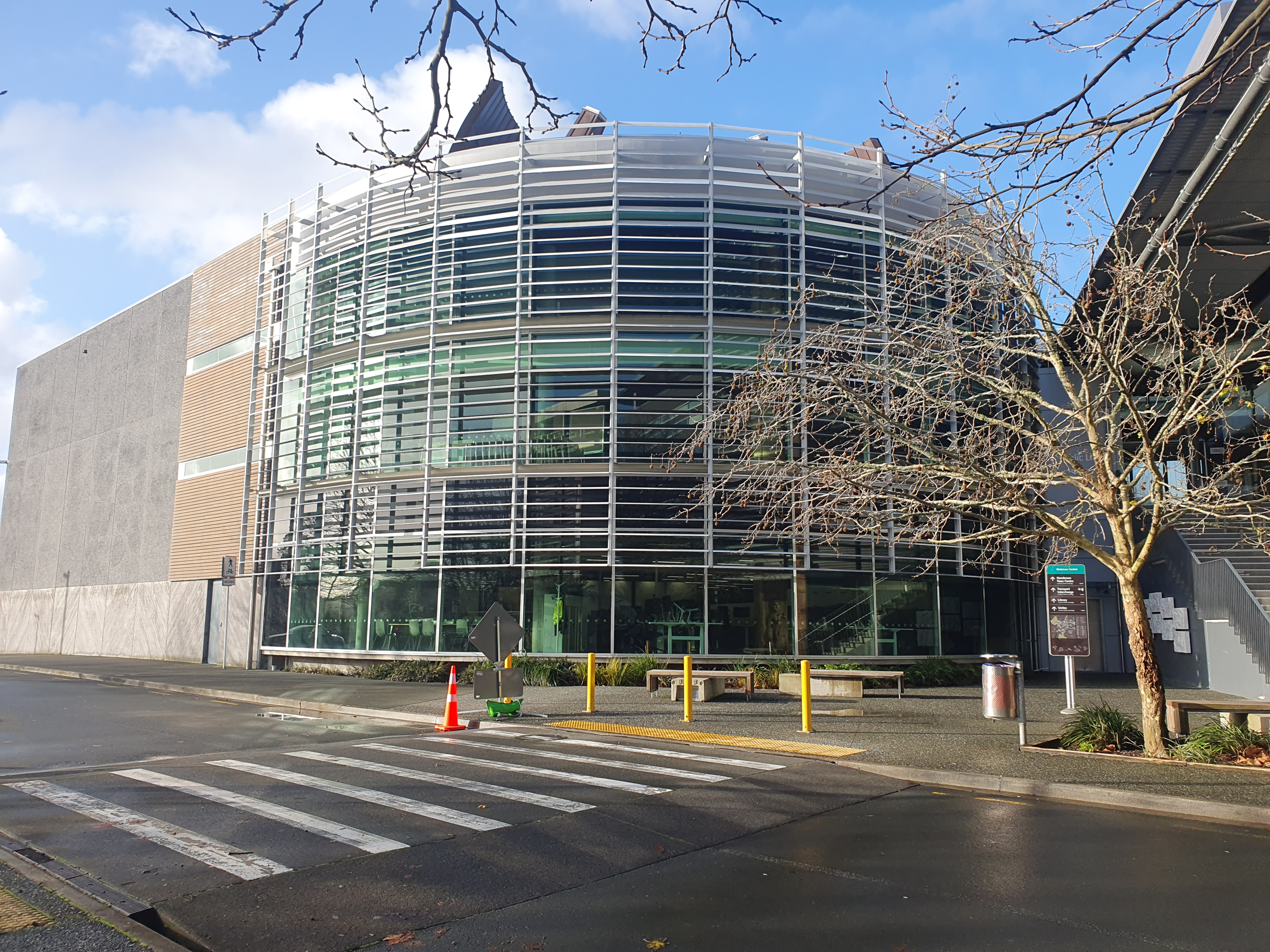
- The Auckland Council Henderson Service Centre

- Country: New Zealand
- Region: Auckland
- Territorial authority: Auckland Council
- Ward: Waitākere Ward
- Legislated: 2010

Area
  - Land: 53.25 km^{2} (20.56 sq mi)

Population (June 2025)
  - Total: 139,200
  - Density: 2,614/km^{2} (6,770/sq mi)

Local Board Members

Leadership
- Chairperson: Chris Carter JP, Labour
- Deputy chairperson: Brooke Loader, Labour

Structure
- Seats: 8
- Political groups: Labour (6); WestWards (1); Independents (1)
- Length of term: 3 years

Elections
- Last election: 2025
- Next election: 2028

Meeting place
- 1 Smythe Road, Henderson

The Henderson-Massey Local Board is one of the 21 local boards of the Auckland Council.

The board's administrative area includes the suburbs of Glendene, Henderson, Massey, Rānui, Sunnyvale, Te Atatū Peninsula, Te Atatū South, Westgate and West Harbour, and covers from the foothills of the Waitākere Ranges in the west and the Waitematā Harbour in the east.

The board is governed by eight board members elected at-large. The inaugural members were elected in the nationwide 2010 local elections, coinciding with the introduction of the Auckland Council.

== Demographics ==
Henderson-Massey Local Board Area covers 53.25 km^{2} (20.56 sq mi) and had an estimated population of 139,200 as of June 2025, with a population density of 2,614 people per km^{2}.

Historical population
Year	Pop.	±% p.a.
2006	98,790	—
2013	107,685	+1.24%
2018	118,422	+1.92%
2023	124,779	+1.05%

Henderson-Massey had a population of 124,779 in the 2023 New Zealand census, an increase of 6,357 people (5.4%) since the 2018 census, and an increase of 17,094 people (15.9%) since the 2013 census. There were 61,803 males, 62,574 females and 399 people of other genders in 39,114 dwellings. 3.2% of people identified as LGBTIQ+. The median age was 34.3 years (compared with 38.1 years nationally). There were 26,208 people (21.0%) aged under 15 years, 26,142 (21.0%) aged 15 to 29, 58,566 (46.9%) aged 30 to 64, and 13,863 (11.1%) aged 65 or older.

People could identify as more than one ethnicity. The results were 43.6% European (Pākehā); 18.1% Māori; 22.2% Pasifika; 31.7% Asian; 2.9% Middle Eastern, Latin American and African New Zealanders (MELAA); and 2.0% other, which includes people giving their ethnicity as "New Zealander". English was spoken by 91.5%, Māori language by 4.1%, Samoan by 6.2%, and other languages by 28.3%. No language could be spoken by 2.9% (e.g. too young to talk). New Zealand Sign Language was known by 0.5%. The percentage of people born overseas was 40.0, compared with 28.8% nationally.

Religious affiliations were 37.2% Christian, 5.8% Hindu, 3.3% Islam, 1.2% Māori religious beliefs, 1.8% Buddhist, 0.4% New Age, 0.1% Jewish, and 1.6% other religions. People who answered that they had no religion were 42.5%, and 6.3% of people did not answer the census question.

Of those at least 15 years old, 24,441 (24.8%) people had a bachelor's or higher degree, 44,448 (45.1%) had a post-high school certificate or diploma, and 29,679 (30.1%) people exclusively held high school qualifications. The median income was $41,900, compared with $41,500 nationally. 9,648 people (9.8%) earned over $100,000 compared to 12.1% nationally. The employment status of those at least 15 was that 52,782 (53.5%) people were employed full-time, 10,701 (10.9%) were part-time, and 3,972 (4.0%) were unemployed.

== Board members ==
=== 2016–2019 ===
- Shane Henderson (chair) (Labour)
- Peter Chan (deputy chair) (Independent)
- Paula Bold-Wilson (Labour)
- Brenda Brady (Independent)
- Warren Flaunty (Independent)
- Will Flavell (Labour)
- Matt Grey (Labour)
- Vanessa Neeson (Independent)

=== 2019–2022 ===
- Chris Carter (chair) (Labour)
- Will Flavell (Labour)
- Brooke Loader (Labour)
- Brenda Brady (Independent)
- Peter Chan (Independent)
- Ingrid Papau (Independent)
- Matt Grey (Independent)
- Vanessa Neeson (Independent)

=== 2022–2025 ===
- Chris Carter (chair) (Labour)
- Will Flavell (Labour)
- Brooke Loader (Labour)
- Brenda Brady (Independent)
- Peter Chan ( Independent)
- Ingrid Papau (Independent)
- Dan Collins (Labour)
- Oscar Kightley (Labour)

=== 2025–2028 ===
The current board members for the 2025-2028 term, elected at the 2025 local elections, are:

Name	Affiliation	Position
Chris Carter	Labour	Chairperson
Brooke Loader	Labour	Deputy Chairperson
Will Flavell	Labour	Board member
Ingrid Papau	Independent	Board member
Oscar Kightley	Labour	Board member
Dan Collins	Labour	Board member
Luke Wilson	WestWards	Board member
Susan Diao	Labour	Board member
