= Liston College =

School in Auckland, New Zealand

Location
- 69 Rathgar Road, Henderson; Auckland 0610; New Zealand; 36.8663°S 174.6227°E

Information
- Type: State Integrated Catholic Boys Secondary (Year 7–13)
- Motto: In Christ We Live
- Established: 1974; 52 years ago
- Ministry of Education Institution no.: 46
- Principal: Steven Dooley
- Enrolment: 856 (July 2026)
- Socio-economic decile: 5M
- Website: liston.school.nz

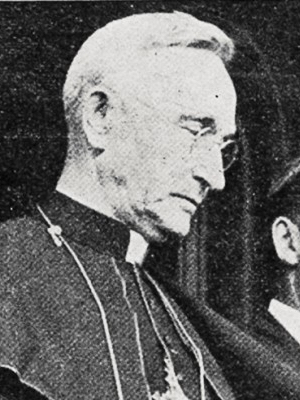
Bishop James Liston

Liston College is a school in Henderson, Auckland, New Zealand, for year seven to 13 boys and offers a Catholic education to its students. It was the second school opened by the Christian Brothers in Auckland. It was named after Archbishop Liston (1881–1976), the seventh Catholic Bishop of Auckland (1929–1970). The school was founded in 1974 to serve the Catholic families of West Auckland and to absorb the growing number of boys who travelled daily to St Peter's College in central Auckland. The proprietor of the college is the Catholic Bishop of Auckland.

== History ==
=== Beginnings ===
Archbishop Liston of Auckland had, for some years, intended to establish a Catholic boys' school in Henderson. At first it was envisioned that it would be staffed by a community of Oblates of Mary Immaculate. But this did not happen and, eventually, the mission was entrusted to the Christian Brothers. From 1967 until 1974, St Dominic's Catholic College, an all-girls school founded in Northcote in 1952 and relocated to Henderson in 1967, was the only Catholic high school in West Auckland.

Liston College was established by Liston's successor, the eighth Catholic Bishop of Auckland, Reginald Delargey (1914–1979, Auxiliary Bishop of Auckland 1957–1970 and Bishop of Auckland 1970–1974) in February 1974. The College commenced operations on 7 February 1974 using classrooms at Holy Cross School, Henderson, with a staff of two Christian Brothers, Br G J Wellsmore and Br J P McKean and 72 foundation pupils. The pupils were divided into Form One 'J' and Form One 'M'. These initials stood for Archbishop Liston's Christian names – James Michael. Classwork began immediately and homework was set on the first day." "Brother Wellsmore supervised the building programme, the establishment of the curriculum and the development of a unique school spirit. The Christian Brothers tradition and values underpinned Br Wellsmore's vision for the school. As the school roll grew and the building programme was completed, the college spirit became embedded in the Liston community." During 1973 and 1974, the school was erected on the property at Edwards Avenue, which prior to work commencing was " ... an open paddock with an old house on it." The buildings, gymnasium and grounds were ready for occupation in the first term of 1975. The school was formally opened in November 1975 by John Mackey, the ninth Catholic Bishop of Auckland (1974–1983), in the presence of Archbishop Liston (who died the following year, 8 July 1976).

=== Development ===
When Brother R A Sisson became Principal (1980–1985) the roll had grown to 380 boys and 28 staff including five brothers. The deaths of Deputy Principal Brother Thomas Aquinas Monagle in 1983 and the head of the Intermediate Mr Hemana in 1984 had a profound effect on the whole school community.

=== Parental and community support ===
"From its beginning the college had good parental support. A very strong PTFA helped run various activities and it provided the backbone of great fundraising efforts. 'Foremost among these was the Friday night flea market which involved many families. Not only was it profitable but it was a great social event in Henderson. Crowds came along and at its peak $40,000 was made annually for the benefit of the school.' The annual gala was another source of revenue. The funds provided sports equipment, cricket wickets and practice nets, tennis courts, computer room, audiovisual materials and teaching resource material. Many building alterations were funded over the years." "The College has been well served by Boards of Governors/trustees who have worked to provide the best in education to the students. The board oversaw the completion of the school buildings, gymnasium, grounds and the Religious Education Centre/Sports Pavilion." Liston College was fortunate to receive some considerable gifts in its early years. In 1978, John and Betty Rose donated the engineering workshop to the school. "Through their generosity, hundreds of young boys got the opportunity to learn engineering skills – skills that many fine-tuned in later years of life." In 1978, Henry Norcross donated the Liston College main entrance crucifix. Graham and Patricia Glamuzina donated the school chapel in 1979. "The chapel erected in the grounds of Liston College stands forever as a tribute to the thoughtfulness and generosity of the Glamuzina family. With the opening of a Catholic boys' college to service West Auckland, Graham and Patricia [Glamuzina] decided that an appropriate addendum to the college would be a separate chapel and so they provided the funding to complete the work. The delightful little chapel with its feature window designed by Colin McCahon will always be a fitting way for us to remember the Glamuzina family."

=== Integration and character change ===
"In 1982 Liston College became an Integrated School and the number of brothers on staff was six." That was the largest representation of Christian Brothers in the history of the school. "The sole remaining brother by 1985 was the Principal Br Sisson. When Mr Francis (Frank) Huckle replaced him, it marked the last official connection of the Christian Brothers with the school". "Br Sisson completed his years as Principal in 1985 and the Brothers withdrew at the end of 1988" However Brother J D O'Neill taught at Liston College 1991–1994 and he was the last Christian Brother to do so. The Christian brother connection with Liston College thus lasted for most of the first twenty years of its existence. "The first lay-Principal, Mr Huckle led the college from 1986 until his [retirement and subsequent] death in April 1999. This saw a period of consolidation and then growth in terms of enrolments, academic success and sporting achievement and it was a continuation of the self-help spirit, which was at the heart of the College from its foundation. 'Among Mr Huckle's many achievements, one was significant. It was his spiritual leadership of the College and it was consistent and clear during his thirteen years as Principal.'". The succeeding principal, Mr Chris Rooney, said that it was appropriate to remember the contributions of Br Wellsmore, Br Sisson, and Mr Huckle, who had shaped the College before him, and he saw it as his task to enhance what they had entrusted to him. Mr Rooney retired in 2021 after 21 years as principal. He was honoured by being made a member of the New Zealand Order of Merit for his services to education in 2023. Mr Rooney was succeeded by Mr Steven Dooley, who had been principal of Sacred Heart College, Auckland.

== Enrolment ==
In July 2026, Liston College had a roll of 856 students, of which 97 (11.3%) identified as Māori.

In 2026, the school had an Equity Index of 414, placing it amongst schools whose students have few socioeconomic barriers to achievement (roughly equivalent to deciles 8 and 9 under the former socio-economic decile system).

== Houses ==
The names and colours of the Liston College Houses are:

- Cook – Red
- Kupe – Yellow
- Pompallier – Blue
- Tasman – Green

The Houses are used for some administrative purposes, such as assigning form classes, but are primarily used for the purpose of holding inter-house competitions in a variety of sports and academic challenges. Winning Houses are allocated points and at the end of the year, the House with the most points wins overall and the leaders of that House receive the "House of the Year" trophy.

== Principals ==
- Brother Gary Joseph Wellsmore cfc (1974–1979) (foundation principal)
- Brother Rex Anthony Sisson cfc (1980–1985)
- Mr F. D. Huckle (1986–1999) (first non-Christian Brother principal)
- Mr Chris S. Rooney (1999–2021) MNZM (2023)
- Mr Steven Dooley (2022–present)

== Notable alumni ==
- Darroch Ball – Member of Parliament (2014–2020); Acting President, New Zealand First Party (2020–2021); personal assistant to Rt Hon Winston Peters in 2023 election campaign and acted as chief of staff for the New Zealand First Party in the coalition negotiations with the National Party and the ACT Party after the election (attended Liston College 1996–1999)
- Josh Blackie – New Zealand rugby union footballer
- Mark Carter – All Black flanker (1991–1998)
- Adrian Choat – New Zealand Rugby Union player; plays Flanker for Auckland in New Zealand's domestic National Provincial Championship and for Blues in Super Rugby.
- Simon Dallow – New Zealand television presenter and lawyer
- Craig Dowd – All Black prop (1993–2000)
- Francisco Hernandez - Member of Parliament (2024–present);
- DJ Forbes - professional rugby union player;
- Alwin Komolong – Professional international footballer; plays in the Papua New Guinea national football team
- Lomano Lemeki – Rugby Sevens player for Japan and XV's
- Valentino Mapapalangi – Tongan professional rugby union player; plays for Tonga at international level
- Sione Ahio (born 2001) – rugby union player
- Julian O'Neill – professional Rugby League player
- Paul Radisich – world touring car champion, won the Touring Car World Cup in 1993 and 1994; foundation pupil of Liston College in 1974,
- Kevin Senio – All Black half back (2005)
- Anthony Swann – New Zealand representative Rugby league player; member of the New Zealand national Rugby League team, "the Kiwis" from 1996; played for Samoa in the 2000 world cup.(?).
- Willie Swann – former Samoa, Warrington Wolves and Auckland Warriors rugby league player.
- Leilani Tominiko – wrestler.
- Anzelo Tuitavuki (born 1998) – rugby union player; plays as a wing for Hawke's Bay in New Zealand's domestic National Provincial Championship competition and for Moana Pasifika in Super Rugby.
- Paul Urlovic – New Zealand representative soccer player; striker; first selected for the New Zealand National Football Team, the All Whites in 1997; 33 caps.
- Ivan Vicelich – New Zealand representative soccer player. Most-capped international of all time with 88 caps between 1995 and 2013. (attended between 1988-1992)

== Misc. Information ==
- The School holds a strict no phone policy, active during school hours
- There is Mass in the Chapel every first and third Friday of a month
- Diarys are handed out to students every year to keep track of homework and to allow for communication between teachers and parents
- The ground floor of the F block is currently being rebuilt into laboratories
- A new gymnasium is planned to be built by 2026

== References/sources ==
- J.C. O'Neill, The History of the Work of the Christian Brothers in New Zealand, unpublished Dip. Ed. thesis, University of Auckland, 1968.
- Paul Malcolm Robertson, Nga Parata Karaitiana The Christian Brothers, A Public Culture in Transition, A Comparative Study of the Indian and New Zealand Provinces, an unpublished thesis for MA in Anthropology, University of Auckland, 1996.
- Liston College 25th Jubilee 1975 – 2000, Liston College, Waitakere City, 2000.
- Graeme Donaldson, To All Parts of the Kingdom: Christian Brothers In New Zealand 1876–2001, Christian Brothers New Zealand Province, Christchurch, 2001.
- Bridget (Anderson) Harrod, 100 Years Catholic Education in Rotorua 1903–2003, St Mary's Catholic Primary School, Rotorua, 2003.
- Nicholas Reid, James Michael Liston: A Life, Victoria University Press, Wellington, 2006.
- Nicholas Reid, The Life and Work of Reginald John Delargey Cardinal, Catholic Diocese of Auckland/Pindar, Auckland, 2008.
