= St Dominic's Catholic College =

St Dominic's Catholic College, Henderson

Location
- 29 Rathgar Road, Henderson, Auckland; New Zealand; 36.8691°S 174.6225°E

Information
- Type: Integrated secondary (year 7–13) Single Sex-Girls Sch
- Motto: Veritas – Truth
- Religious affiliation: Roman Catholic
- Established: 1952; 74 years ago
- Ministry of Education Institution no.: 47
- Principal: Anna Swann
- Enrolment: 851 (July 2026)
- Socio-economic decile: 5M
- Website: www.stdoms.ac.nz

St Dominic's Catholic College, Henderson is an integrated college for girls in Year 7 to Year 13 located in Henderson, Auckland, New Zealand, 25 kilometres from downtown Auckland City.

The college was founded by the Dominican Sisters in 1952 in Northcote, Auckland. The school was transferred to Henderson in 1968. In 1982 the school was integrated into the State education system under the Private Schools Conditional Integration Act 1975.

== History ==
The school was established by the Dominican Sisters, in order to serve the Catholic community of West Auckland, which had developed due to immigrants from Croatia (then Dalmatia), Ireland and Britain.

== Notable alumnae ==
- Anne-Marie Brady (born 1966), Professor of Political Science, University of Canterbury
- Angee Nicholas (born 1993), lawyer and politician
- Margaret Wilson (born 1947), academic and former politician; first woman elected as Speaker of the New Zealand House of Representatives

== References and sources ==
- Mary Augustine McCarthy OP, Star in the south: the centennial history of the New Zealand Dominican Sisters, St Dominic's Priory, Dunedin, 1970.
- St. Dominic’s College : silver jubilee, 1952–1977, The College, Auckland. 1977.
- E.R. Simmons, A Brief History of the Catholic Church in New Zealand, Catholic Publication Centre, Auckland, 1978 and In Cruce Salus, A History of the Diocese of Auckland 1848–1980, Catholic Publication Centre, Auckland 1982.
- Michael King, God's farthest outpost : a history of Catholics in New Zealand, Viking, Auckland 1997.
- Nicholas Reid, James Michael Liston: A Life, Victoria University Press, Wellington, 2006.
