= Waitākere ward =

- Ward of Auckland
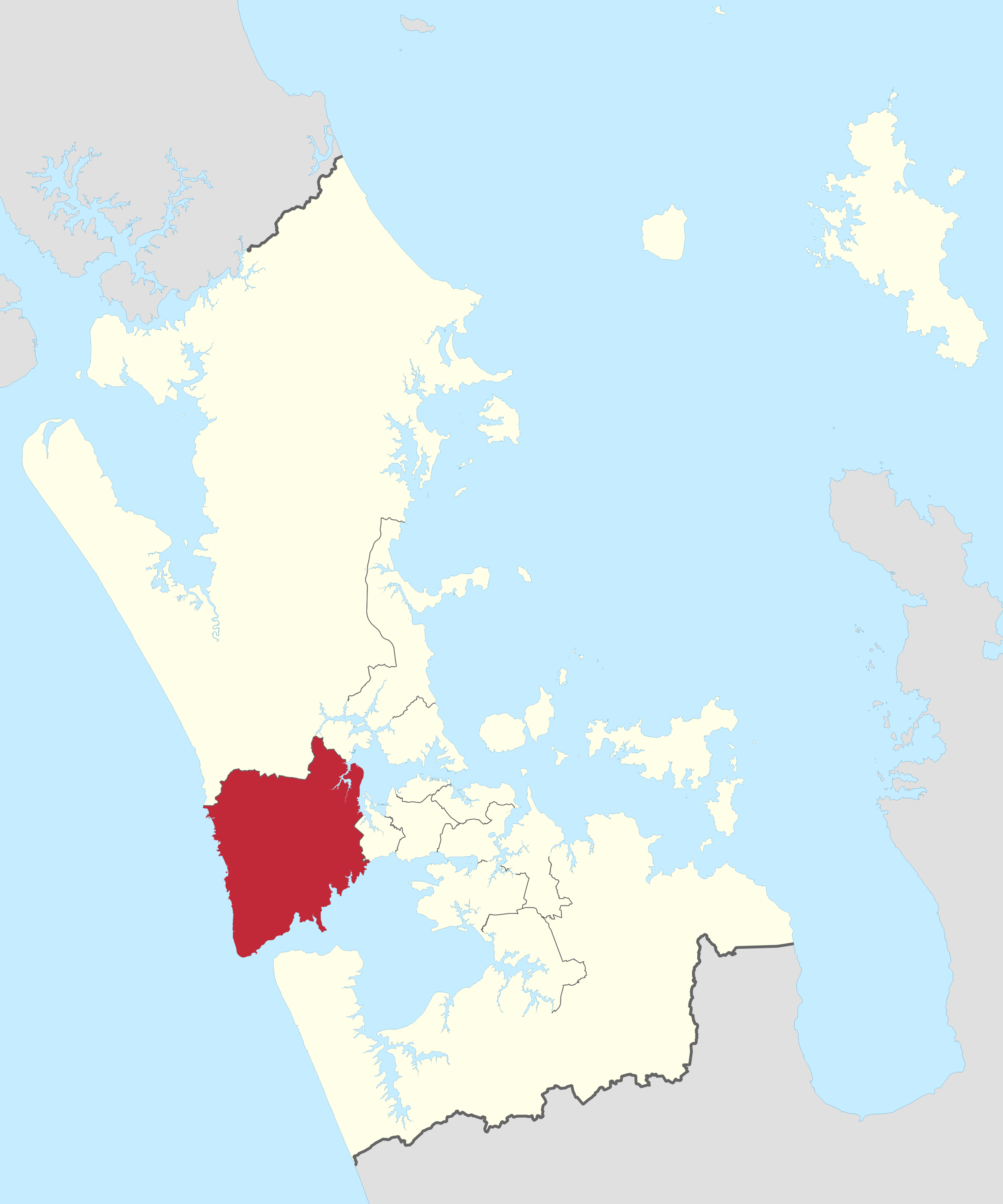
- Country: New Zealand
- Island: North Island
- Region: Auckland Region

Area
  - Land: 359.00 km^{2} (138.61 sq mi)

Population (June 2025)
  - Total: 196,100
  - Density: 546.2/km^{2} (1,415/sq mi)

The Waitākere ward is an electoral ward of Auckland Council in New Zealand. It covers part of the old Waitakere City lying west of a line from Te Atatū Peninsula to Titirangi.

The ward elects two councillors, currently Shane Henderson and Ken Turner, who have oversight of its two local boards, Henderson-Massey and Waitākere Ranges.

== Demographics ==
Waitākere ward covers 359.00 km^{2} (138.61 sq mi) and had an estimated population of 196,100 as of June 2025, with a population density of 546 people per km^{2}.

Historical population
Year	Pop.	±% p.a.
2006	144,288	—
2013	156,081	+1.13%
2018	170,514	+1.78%
2023	178,677	+0.94%

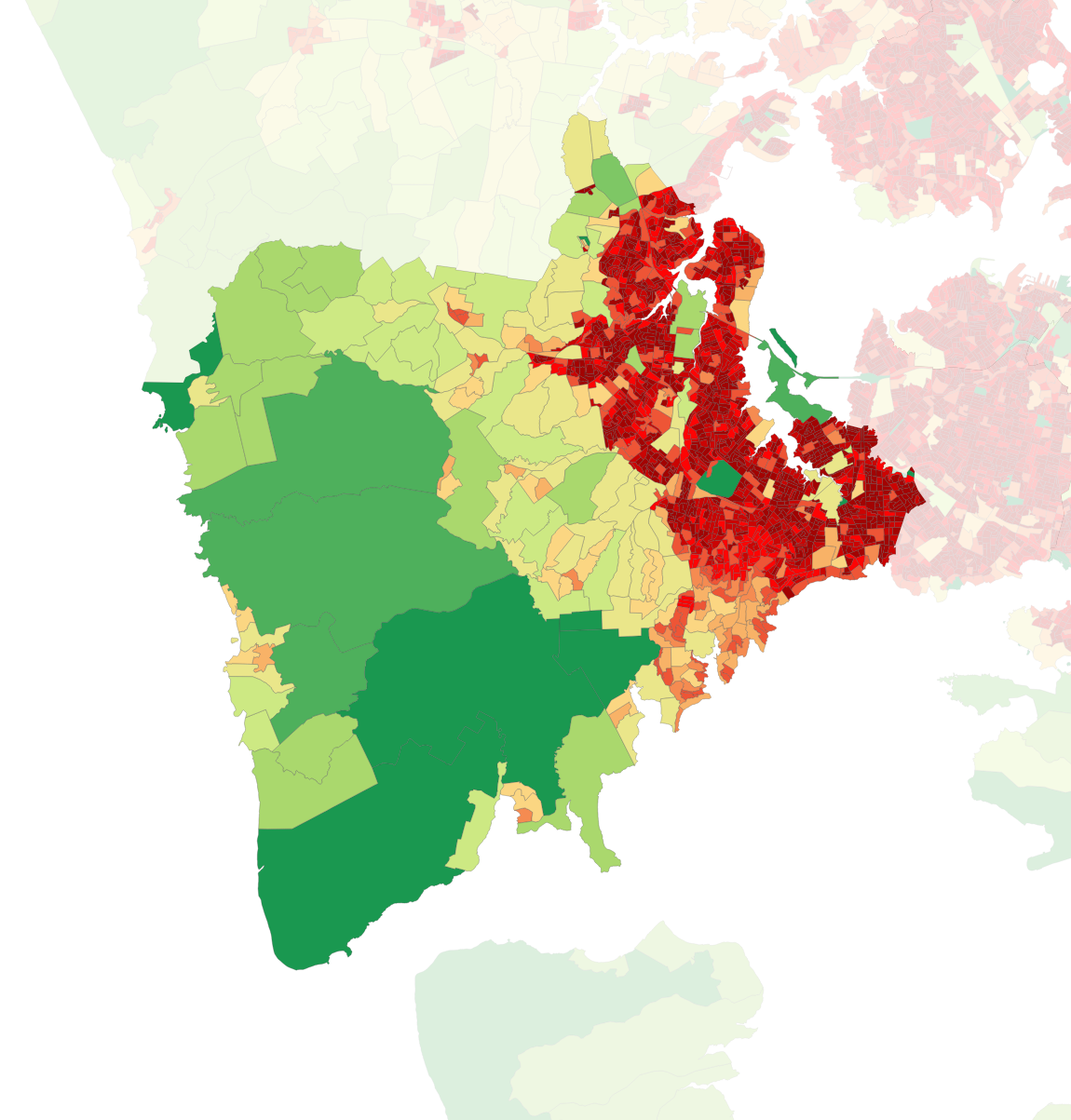
Population density in the 2023 census

Waitākere ward had a population of 178,677 in the 2023 New Zealand census, an increase of 8,163 people (4.8%) since the 2018 census, and an increase of 22,596 people (14.5%) since the 2013 census. There were 88,563 males, 89,445 females and 666 people of other genders in 57,267 dwellings. 3.4% of people identified as LGBTIQ+. The median age was 35.2 years (compared with 38.1 years nationally). There were 37,266 people (20.9%) aged under 15 years, 35,844 (20.1%) aged 15 to 29, 85,176 (47.7%) aged 30 to 64, and 20,391 (11.4%) aged 65 or older.

People could identify as more than one ethnicity. The results were 51.6% European (Pākehā); 16.8% Māori; 19.5% Pasifika; 27.4% Asian; 2.7% Middle Eastern, Latin American and African New Zealanders (MELAA); and 2.0% other, which includes people giving their ethnicity as "New Zealander". English was spoken by 92.7%, Māori language by 3.7%, Samoan by 5.3%, and other languages by 25.4%. No language could be spoken by 2.7% (e.g. too young to talk). New Zealand Sign Language was known by 0.5%. The percentage of people born overseas was 37.4, compared with 28.8% nationally.

Religious affiliations were 34.4% Christian, 5.2% Hindu, 2.9% Islam, 1.0% Māori religious beliefs, 1.7% Buddhist, 0.5% New Age, 0.1% Jewish, and 1.6% other religions. People who answered that they had no religion were 46.3%, and 6.5% of people did not answer the census question.

Of those at least 15 years old, 37,788 (26.7%) people had a bachelor's or higher degree, 65,097 (46.0%) had a post-high school certificate or diploma, and 38,526 (27.2%) people exclusively held high school qualifications. The median income was $43,700, compared with $41,500 nationally. 16,623 people (11.8%) earned over $100,000 compared to 12.1% nationally. The employment status of those at least 15 was that 76,422 (54.0%) people were employed full-time, 16,632 (11.8%) were part-time, and 5,310 (3.8%) were unemployed.

== Councillors ==
Waitākere Ward councillors of Auckland
- Incumbent; Shane Henderson; Ken Turner
- Term length: Three years
- Inaugural holder: Penny Hulse; Sandra Coney
- Formation: 1 November 2010
- Website: www.aucklandcouncil.govt.nz

Election		Councillors Elected	Affiliation	Votes	Notes
2010	1	Penny Hulse	Independent	18125	Hulse was appointed Deputy Mayor of Auckland by mayor Len Brown, and served alongside him until he stepped down. She was replaced by Bill Cashmore upon Phil Goff becoming Mayor in 2016.
2010	2	Sandra Coney	Best for the West	13451	
2013	1	Penny Hulse	West at Heart	19498	
2013	2	Linda Cooper	Independent	11437	
2016	1	Penny Hulse	West at Heart	19935	Hulse retired from Auckland Council at the 2019 elections.
2016	2	Linda Cooper	Independent	12442	
2019	1	Linda Cooper	Independent	14750	
2019	2	Shane Henderson	Labour	14695	
2022	1	Shane Henderson	Labour	16545	
2022	2	Ken Turner	WestWards	14654	Seat gained from Linda Cooper by 659 votes
2025	1	Shane Henderson	Labour	14589	
2025	2	Ken Turner	WestWards	9073	

== Election results ==
Election results for the Waitākere ward:

=== 2025 ===
Waitākere ward
Affiliation	Candidate	Votes	%
Labour	Shane Henderson^{†}	14,589	
WestWards	Ken Turner^{†}	9,073	
Independent	Linda Cooper	6,852	
Future West	Jess Rose	6,430	
WestWards	Sunil Kaushal	6,202	
Independent	Ingrid Papau	5,011	
Independent	Peter Chan	4,556	
Independent	Jim Cornes	4,481	
Independent	Serge Roud	2,498	
Independent	Kay Luv	2,287	
Independent	Michael Coote	2,190	
Independent	Seamus Lal	1,545	
Informal		97	
Blank		688	
Turnout			
Registered		127,687	
Labour hold			
WestWards hold			
^{†} incumbent

=== 2022 ===
Waitākere Ward
Affiliation		Candidate	Votes	%
	Labour	Shane Henderson	16,545	41.40
#7D6B2D	WestWards	Ken Turner	14,654	36.67
	Independent	Linda Cooper	13,995	35.02
#7D6B2D	WestWards	Shawn Blanchfield	8,472	21.20
	Independent	Peter Chan	8,199	20.52
	Independent	Tua Schuster	3,278	8.20
	Independent	Aimela Hansen	2,648	6.63
	Independent	Michael Coote	2,550	6.38
Informal			61	0.15
Blank			1,528	3.82
Turnout			39,959	

=== 2016 election results ===
	Name	Affiliation	Votes	%
1	Penny Hulse	Independent - West at Heart	19,935	28.2%
2	Linda Cooper	Independent	12,442	17.6%
	Greg Presland	Labour	11,744	16.6%
	Peter Chan	Independent	7,427	10.5%
	Ken Turner	WestWards	5,129	7.3%
	David Rankin	Independent	4,520	6.4%
	John Riddell	Independent	3,230	4.6%
	Rochelle Gormly	Independent	2,588	3.7%
	JB Woolston	United Future	1,779	2.5%
Blank			1,802	2.6%
Informal			69	0.1%
Turnout			70,665	
