= Glen Eden Intermediate School =

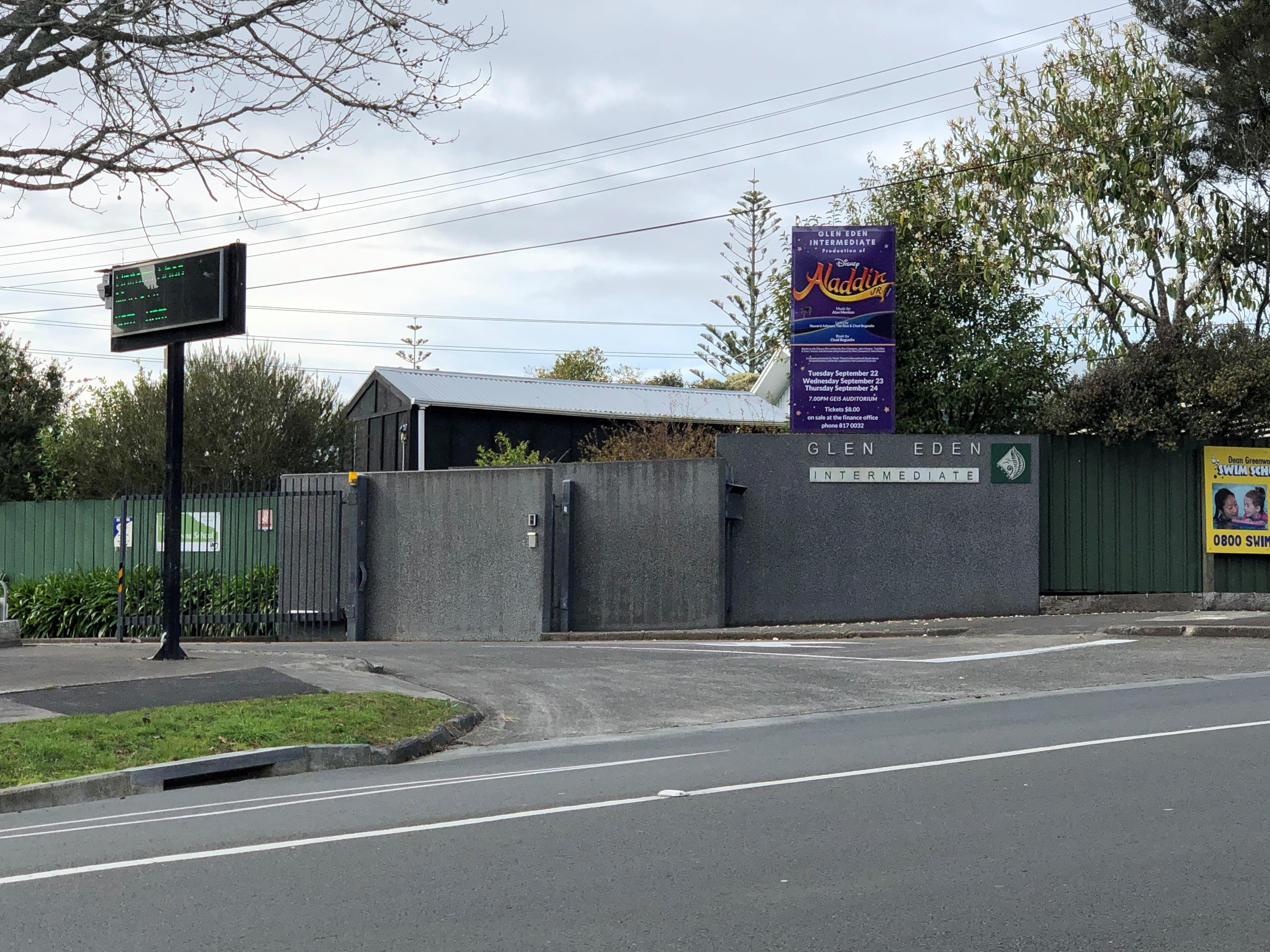
- The front gate of the school

Location
- Kaurilands Road, Titirangi, New Zealand; 36.9241°S 174.6526°E

Information
- Type: State, co-educational, intermediate Years 7-8
- Motto: To Thine Own Self Be True
- Established: 1961
- Ministry of Education Institution no.: 1284
- Principal: Jonathan Hughes
- Enrolment: 924 (July 2026)
- Socio-economic decile: 8
- Website: www.geis.school.nz

Glen Eden Intermediate School (G.E.I.S) is an intermediate school located in the suburb of Kaurilands in Auckland, New Zealand. The roll fluctuates around 1000 students and there is an enrolment scheme (school zone) in place. In-zone suburbs include Titirangi, Laingholm, Woodlands Park most of Glen Eden, Konini and Kaurilands. The current principal is Jonathan Hughes.

== History and Organisation ==
The school was originally divided into eight syndicates named after New Zealand trees. Each syndicate had four classrooms, (except the "Manuka" syndicate which held five). In 2010, the syndicates were replaced with four "mini schools", Te Henga, Karekare, Muriwai and Piha named after local West Coast beaches. All classes are combined Year 7 and Year 8 with elected student councilors who attend bi-weekly school council meetings. The school has provision for programmes for students who need enrichment(that being room 11 and room 20).

In 2001 the school opened a technology block which as of 2025 teaches one minischool every day and has eight classes: Food Technology, Design Technology, Sound Arts, Dramatic Arts, Visual Arts, Hard Materials, Enviro Technology, and Video Production. The Video Production room is also the headquarters of "Cactus", the school's daily TV show which has been broadcasting daily throughout the school since 1995. The school previously had a radio station, T.N.T (Totally Not Television) which opened in 2010 but is no longer active.

A gymnasium that had "full-sized basketball and netball courts, volleyball and badminton courts" was opened in 2001. The gym opening coincided with the school's 40th anniversary, and the former board of trustees chair Brian Clayton noted that "the gym is a legacy to present and future students and the community...[and]...It's a testimony to a number of things that reflect the school." An auditorium, added later, was merged with the administration block. There is a daily school fitness programme consisting of road runs, aerobics, and a variety of activities held on the artificial turf and back court.

== Learning environment ==
The school teaches to the NZ Curriculum. Some classes in the school have a modern learning environment with "collaborative, flexible classroom(s) that can evolve to meet the needs of a rapidly changing society ...[and are]...different to the traditional style of rows of desks facing the teacher." Students are supported to use devices for online learning and encouraged to bring their own device.

== Sport ==
Each year the school holds events in cross country, athletics and swimming, with students competing in their year levels. Students can try out to go to sports camps and for NZ AIMS Games, a major sporting competition which is held every September in Tauranga. School teams compete in the Netball Waitakere competition. A variety of teams also participate in the local inter-school zone sports competitions. There is a daily school fitness programme consisting of road runs, aerobics, and a variety of activities.

The school has a variety of facilities it uses in fitness and sporting programmes, including a school gymnasium, all weather astroturf, five lane swimming pool, two cricket cages, three outdoor netball courts and a football/rugby field. The school utilizes these facilities in the daily fitness programme as well as in the weekly hour-long P.E sessions all students are required to partake in. All of these facilities and sports programme on the whole are managed by the schools dedicated sporting director.

== Mini Schools ==
Each Mini school consists of two learning areas with 4 classrooms respectively. The Mini schools consist of 8-9 classrooms. Karekare's colour is black, Piha's blue, Te Henga's yellow, and Muriwai's red.

Karekare - Rooms 1, 2, 3, 4, 5, 6, 7, 8

Piha - Rooms 9, 10, 11, 12, 13, 14, 15, 16, 17

Te Henga - Rooms 18, 19, 20, 21, 22, 23, 24, 25

Muriwai - Rooms 27, 28, 29, 30, 31, 32, 33, 34

Glen Eden Intermediate School maintains two dedicated enrichment classes—specifically Room 11 and Room 20—which require students to pass an entry assessment to be accepted.

== Transport ==
The school offers many ways to get into school, with a dedicated drop off area, and many buses to both in-zone and out of zone locations. These buses include the out of zone Henderson and Oratia buses. These work on a per-zone basis, costing $25 for a 10-trip 1 zone pass, $35 for a 2 zone pass, and $45 for a 3 zone pass. There is also a Huia bus, with free travel paid for by the Ministry Of Education, and in-zone buses to Woodlands Park (073), Laingholm (074), and French Bay/Wood Bay (025). These buses require an AT hop card, paywave card, or a smartphone or smartwatch for a flat-fee of $1.55. There is also a bike shed, providing safekeeping for all bikes, e-bikes, scooters and e-scooters parked at school during the day.

== The arts ==
Every second year the school holds a major school production. In 2018 it was Hairspray Junior, 2020 Aladdin, in 2023 (missing a year due to COVID restrictions) it was Shrek Jr and in 2025 school the school production was Moana Jr There is also a concert band and two rock bands - one for each year level - and these, along with the annual talent show (X-Factor GEIS), are widely supported by the school community. Large Pasifika and kapa haka groups are well attended and play an important cultural role in the school.

== Community ==
Every year students from the school participate in the World Vision New Zealand 40 Hour Famine to raise funds to support children, families and communities to overcome poverty and injustice.

== Demographics ==
The school was last visited by The Education Review Office (ERO) on 11 November 2016. At that time, Glen Eden Intermediate School had 995 students, of whom 55% were male and 45% female. There were 21 international students and the ethnic make up of the school was as follows: 53% New Zealand European (Pākehā), 16% Māori, 6% Samoan, Asian and Indian at 5% each and 10% as other ethnicity.

== International ==
Glen Eden Intermediate has an international program that brings Korean students from to the school up to 3 times a year, and does annual trips to Japan, and Cairns, Australia.

Sister Schools:

Chulalongkorn University Demonstration School (Bangkok, Thailand)

Sawara Junior High (Fukuoka, Japan)

Hengshui High School (Heibei Province)

Various South Korean schools

== Notable alumni ==
- Claire Achmad
- Caleb Clarke
- Michael Fatialofa
- Rose McIver

== Gallery ==
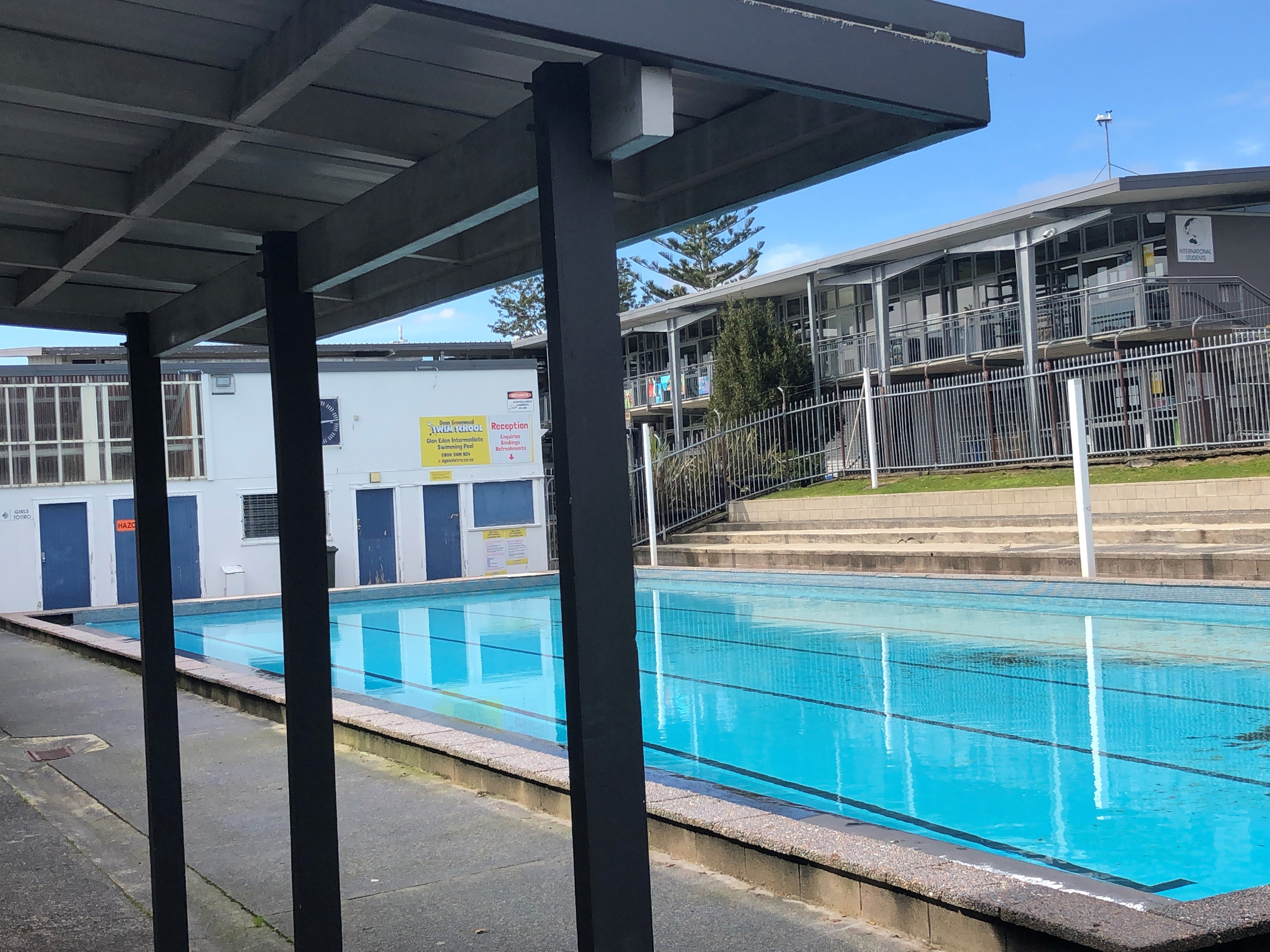
The school pool

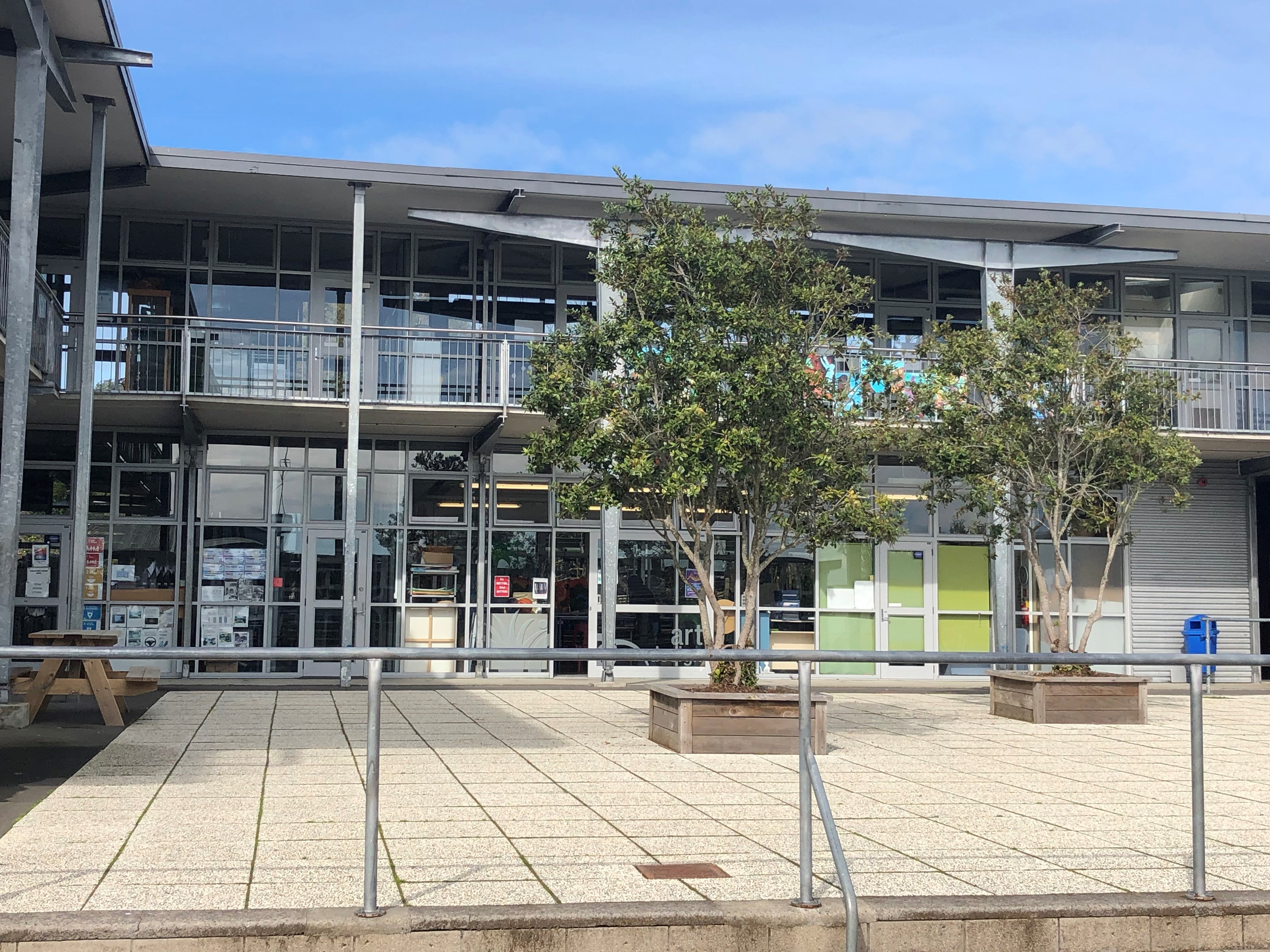
The Technology block

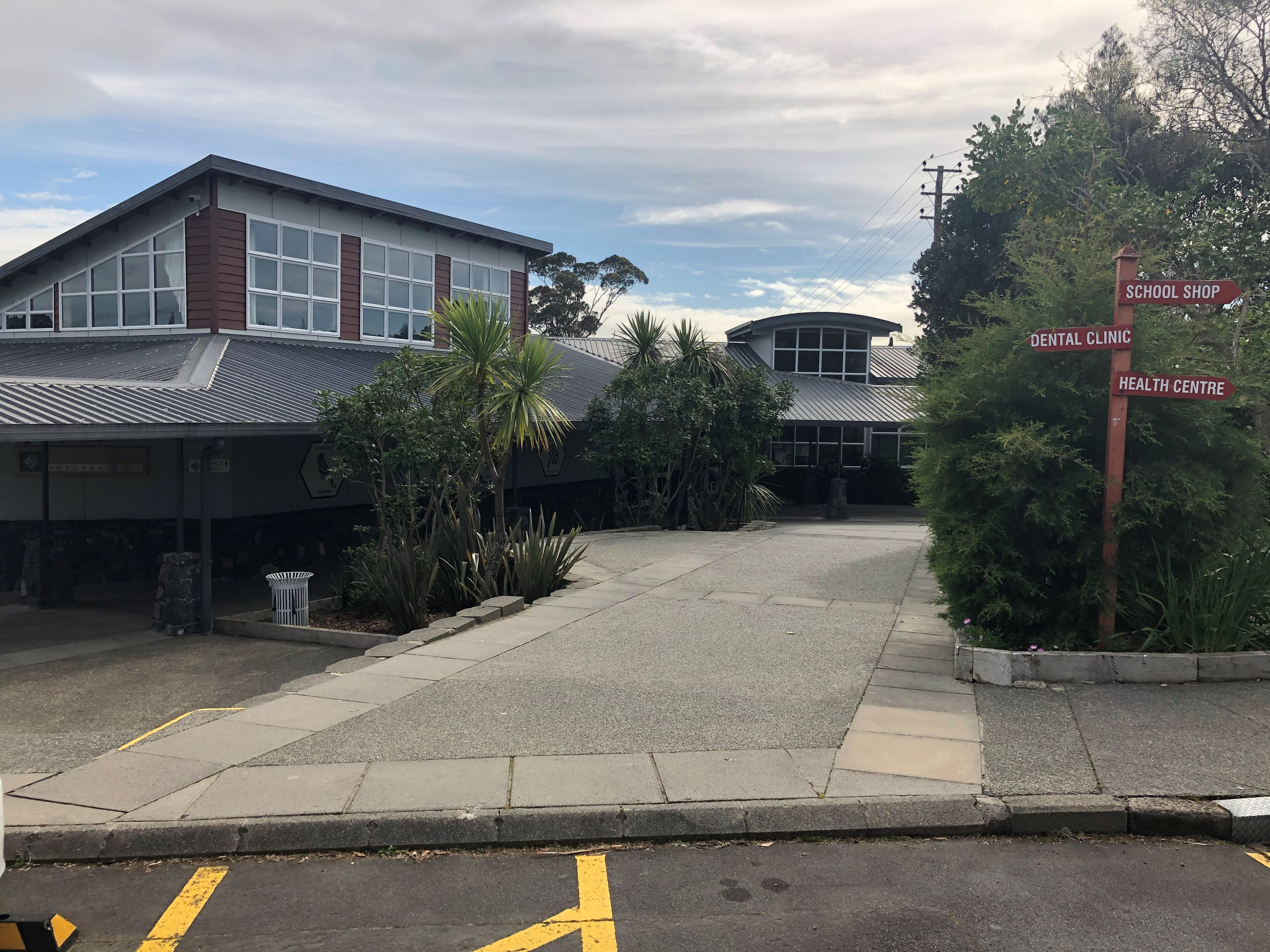
The Administration block

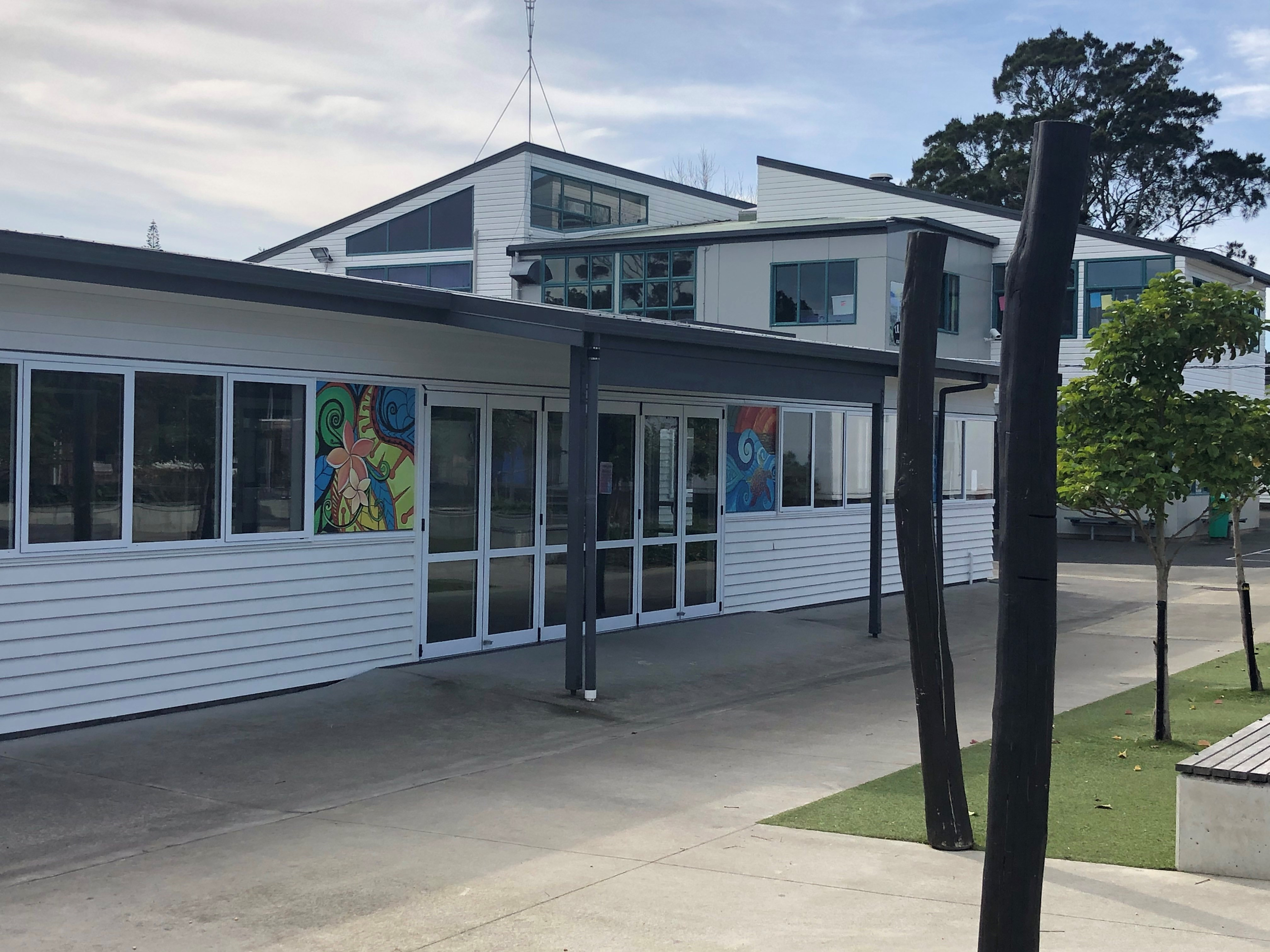
The Modern Learning block
