= Woodlands Park =

- Suburb
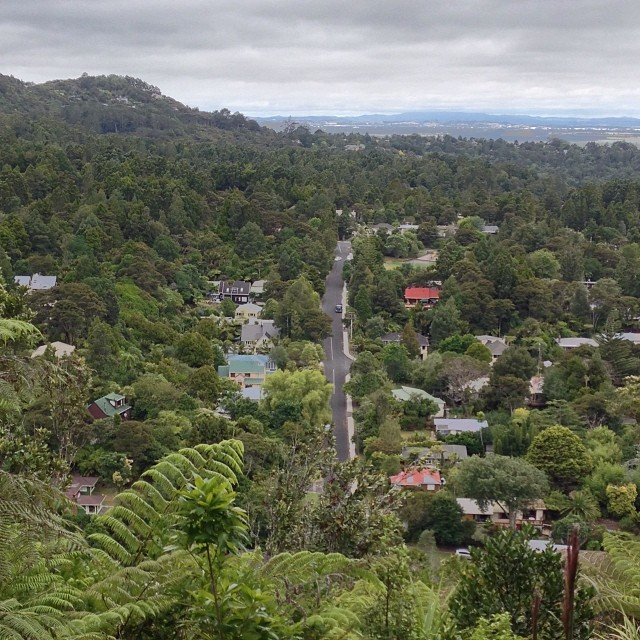
- Interactive map of Woodlands Park
- Coordinates: 36°56′56″S 174°37′49″E
- Country: New Zealand
- City: Auckland
- Local authority: Auckland Council
- Electoral ward: Waitākere ward
- Local board: Waitākere Ranges Local Board

Area
  - Land: 130 ha (320 acres)

Population (2023 Census)
  - Total: 1,056
  - Density: 810/km^{2} (2,100/sq mi)

Waiatarua	Waima	Titirangi
Waiatarua	Woodlands Park	French Bay
Huia	Laingholm	(Little Muddy Creek)

Woodlands Park is a suburb on the western outskirts of West Auckland, New Zealand. Nestled in the Waitākere Ranges, Woodlands Park lies in a valley, bush clad hills separating it from Titirangi (to the north east), Parau and Huia (to the south east) and Laingholm (to the south).

Most housing was built in the 1950s to 1970s, and lies within native bush.

== History ==
The area that would later become Woodlands Park was established as farmland during the 1860s. Between the 1860s and 1914, the main access to the outside world was by the dock at Little Muddy Creek, until road access became more common. In the early 20th century, the area was a part of McEldowney fruit farm, owned by an Irish immigrant family.

== Demographics ==
Woodlands Park covers 1.30 km^{2} (0.50 sq mi). It is part of the Waima-Woodlands Park statistical area.

Historical population
Year	Pop.	±% p.a.
2006	978	—
2013	993	+0.22%
2018	1,077	+1.64%
2023	1,056	−0.39%

Woodlands Park had a population of 1,056 in the 2023 New Zealand census, a decrease of 21 people (−1.9%) since the 2018 census, and an increase of 63 people (6.3%) since the 2013 census. There were 507 males, 534 females and 6 people of other genders in 360 dwellings. 3.4% of people identified as LGBTIQ+. There were 243 people (23.0%) aged under 15 years, 174 (16.5%) aged 15 to 29, 534 (50.6%) aged 30 to 64, and 111 (10.5%) aged 65 or older.

People could identify as more than one ethnicity. The results were 88.9% European (Pākehā); 9.7% Māori; 4.0% Pasifika; 9.1% Asian; 1.7% Middle Eastern, Latin American and African New Zealanders (MELAA); and 1.4% other, which includes people giving their ethnicity as "New Zealander". English was spoken by 96.9%, Māori language by 2.0%, and other languages by 16.2%. No language could be spoken by 2.6% (e.g. too young to talk). New Zealand Sign Language was known by 1.1%. The percentage of people born overseas was 27.6, compared with 28.8% nationally.

Religious affiliations were 18.5% Christian, 0.3% Hindu, 0.9% Islam, 0.3% Māori religious beliefs, 0.9% Buddhist, 0.3% Jewish, and 0.9% other religions. People who answered that they had no religion were 68.5%, and 8.8% of people did not answer the census question.

Of those at least 15 years old, 288 (35.4%) people had a bachelor's or higher degree, 390 (48.0%) had a post-high school certificate or diploma, and 114 (14.0%) people exclusively held high school qualifications. 189 people (23.2%) earned over $100,000 compared to 12.1% nationally. The employment status of those at least 15 was that 477 (58.7%) people were employed full-time, 114 (14.0%) were part-time, and 18 (2.2%) were unemployed.

== Education ==
Woodlands Park School is a contributing primary (years 1–6) state school with a roll of 277 students as of July 2026. The school was founded in 1958. Titirangi Rudolf Steiner School is a full primary (years 1–8) private school with a roll of 182 students. It was founded in 1987 and provides education based on the Steiner-Waldorf philosophy. Both schools are co-educational.

The nearest State secondary schools are Green Bay High School, Kelston Boys' High School and Kelston Girls' High School. Catholic students usually commute by train from New Lynn to Marist College (girls) or St Peter's College (boys).
