= Claire Achmad =

Former Chief Children's Commissioner in New Zealand

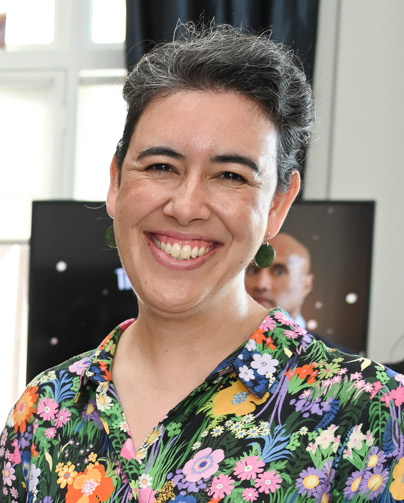
- Achmad in 2024

Children's Commissioner
- In office 1 November 2023 – 31 July 2026
- Preceded by: Frances Eivers
- Succeeded by: Jane Searle

Personal details
- Born: Claire Indrawati Achmad Waitākere Ranges, New Zealand
- Education: Leiden University

Academic background
- Thesis: Children's Rights in International Commercial Surrogacy: Exploring the Challenges from a Child Rights, Public International Law Perspective (2018)
- Doctoral advisor: Mariëlle Bruning; Machteld Vonk

Claire Indrawati Achmad is a New Zealand lawyer. She served as the Chief Children's Commissioner between 2023 and 2025, and became the sole Children's Commissioner following the abolition of the Children and Young People's Commission in August 2025. She concluded her term as the Children's Commissioner in July 2026.

== Early life and education ==
Achmad has a Pākehā mother and a Javanese father. She grew up in the Waitakere Ranges, and was educated at Titirangi Primary School, Glen Eden Intermediate School, and Avondale College, where she was head girl in her final year. After completing a Bachelor of Arts and Bachelor of Laws at the University of Auckland, Achmad earned a Master of Laws specialising in Public International Law prior to her PhD titled Children's Rights in International Commercial Surrogacy: Exploring the Challenges from a Child Rights, Public International Law Perspective at the University of Leiden.

== Career ==
Achmad worked in child advocacy for the Human Rights Commission, World Vision in Melbourne, UNICEF, and Barnardo's Aotearoa.

Achmad is a member of the Asia New Zealand Foundation's Leadership Network. In 2007 Achmad was named CLANZ-Bell Gully Young Corporate Lawyer of the Year. The University of Auckland included Achmad in their '40 under 40' profiles of young alumni "who continue to shine in both their professional and personal lives".

Achmad was chief executive of the collective organisation Social Service Providers Te Pai Ora o Aotearoa from 2021 to 2023. In November 2023 she was appointed to a five year term to lead the Children and Young People's Commission (Mana Mokopuna), which had previously been the Office of the Children’s Commissioner. She replaced Judge Frances Eivers, who returned to the bench. She had been Deputy Children's Commissioner since July 2023. As Commissioner Achmad has expressed concerns about government plans to run military-style bootcamps for young offenders.

In late June 2025, the Sixth National Government passed legislation abolishing the Children and Young People's Commission and reinstating the single Children's Commissioner, effective 1 August 2025. Under the new framework, Achmad remained as Children's Commissioner for at least one year. On 14 August, Achmad called for Gloriavale Christian Community's private school to be shut down after the school failed two consecutive Education Review Office reports. She said:

I'm hugely concerned to see yet another report from ERO outlining a very troubling situation at the Gloriavale school. This is now clear-cut. I'm calling for the school to be closed. I have zero confidence about children's physical and emotional safety and well-being at the school.

In early July 2026, the Social Development Minister Louise Upston announced that Achmad would be succeeded as Children's Commissioner by former detective, solicitor and Child Matters charity CEO Jane Searle, effective 1 August 2026. According to The New Zealand Herald, Achmad had reapplied for the role but the New Zealand Government had decided not to reappoint her, effectively reducing her term by 2.5 years. In response, several children's charities organised a petition calling on the Government to retain her as Children's Commissioner.

== Selected works ==
- Sekhar Bandyopadhyay, SungYong Lee, Alex Tan, Andrea Chloe Wong, Sanjana Hattotuwa, Claire Achmad (30 May 2019). "Political spectrums in Asia". Asia Media Centre : Helping New Zealand media cover Asia.
- Achmad, Claire (2015). "Combatting Statelessness". New Zealand International Review. 40 (1): 22–26. ISSN 0110-0262. JSTOR 48551517.
- Achmad, Claire; Vonk, Machteld (1 October 2019). "Upholding the law on international commercial surrogacy: at whose cost?". Tijdschrift voor Familie- en Jeugdrecht (10): 239–246.
- Claire Achmad (1 January 2017), Protecting the Locus of Vulnerability: Preliminary Ideas for Guidance on Protecting the Rights of the Child in International Commercial Surrogacy, pp. 513–540, doi:10.1163/9789004295056_026, Wikidata Q130316792
- Claire Achmad (13 March 2020). "Realising treaty-based protection in Aotearoa's child welfare system". Policy Quarterly. 16 (1). doi:10.26686/pq.v16i1.6457. ISSN 2324-1098. Wikidata Q130316791.
