= William Willetts =

William Willetts may refer to:

- William Willetts (art historian) (1918–1995), British scholar of South-East Asian art studies
- William Willetts (sailor) (1893–1957), New Zealand yacht racer

== See also ==
- William Willett (disambiguation)
- William Willet, American artist
