= Waima, New Zealand =

Waima could refer to several places in New Zealand:

- Waima, Northland is a community in the Hokianga.
- Waima is a suburb of Auckland.
- The Waima River in Marlborough flows through the Waima Valley into the Pacific Ocean.
