= Albert Willetts =

New Zealand yacht designer

- Born: Albert Leslie Willetts; 22 February 1900; Devonport, Auckland, New Zealand
- Died: 23 May 1979 (aged 79); Laingholm, Auckland, New Zealand
- Other name: Trotter
- Occupations: Sailor; Boat designer Boat builder

Albert Leslie Willetts (22 February 1900 – 23 May 1979) was a notable New Zealand yacht designer, builder, and racer. Along with his brother, William Willetts, he won numerous yachting trophies in New Zealand during the 1920s and 1930s.

== Biography ==
Willetts was born in Devonport, Auckland, New Zealand on 22 February 1900, one of ten children of Arthur Willetts and his wife Sybil née Beeston. Arthur Willetts worked in the boat-building industry as a designer and foreman at a shipyard. Albert Willetts, who was nicknamed Trotter for the manner of his walk, was educated at local schools and became involved in yachting, along with his brother, William.

He worked as a cabinet maker but also designed and built numerous yachts, ranging from 14-foot X and Y class vessels to 18-foot V class yachts. He sailed competitively, winning New Zealand's premier competition for small yachts, the Sanders Memorial Cup, in 1924, 1929 and in 1947. In the 1930s, he switched to larger boats. In 1938, he built and sailed Irena in that year's World’s 18-Footer Championship, which took place in Sydney, Australia. The Irena finished 5th overall, the best performing of the four New Zealand yachts that entered the competition.

He died at Laingholm, near Auckland, on 23 May 1979. He was survived by two daughters; his wife, Vera née McDonald, whom he had married in 1922, had predeceased him.
