= Little Muddy Creek =

Little Muddy Creek may refer to:

- Little Muddy Creek (Conestoga River), in Lancaster County, Pennsylvania
- Little Muddy Creek (Missouri River), a tributary of the Missouri River in the U.S. states of Montana and North Dakota
- Little Muddy Creek (New Zealand)
