= Waikumete =

Waikumete may refer to:

- Glen Eden, New Zealand, known by the name Waikumete until 1921

- The Waikumete Cemetery, located in Glen Eden

- Little Muddy Creek (New Zealand), traditionally known as Waikūmete
