= Titirangi Soldiers' Memorial Church =

War memorial in Auckland, New Zealand

Coordinates: 36°56′24.68″S 174°39′20.95″E

Titirangi Soldier's Memorial Church
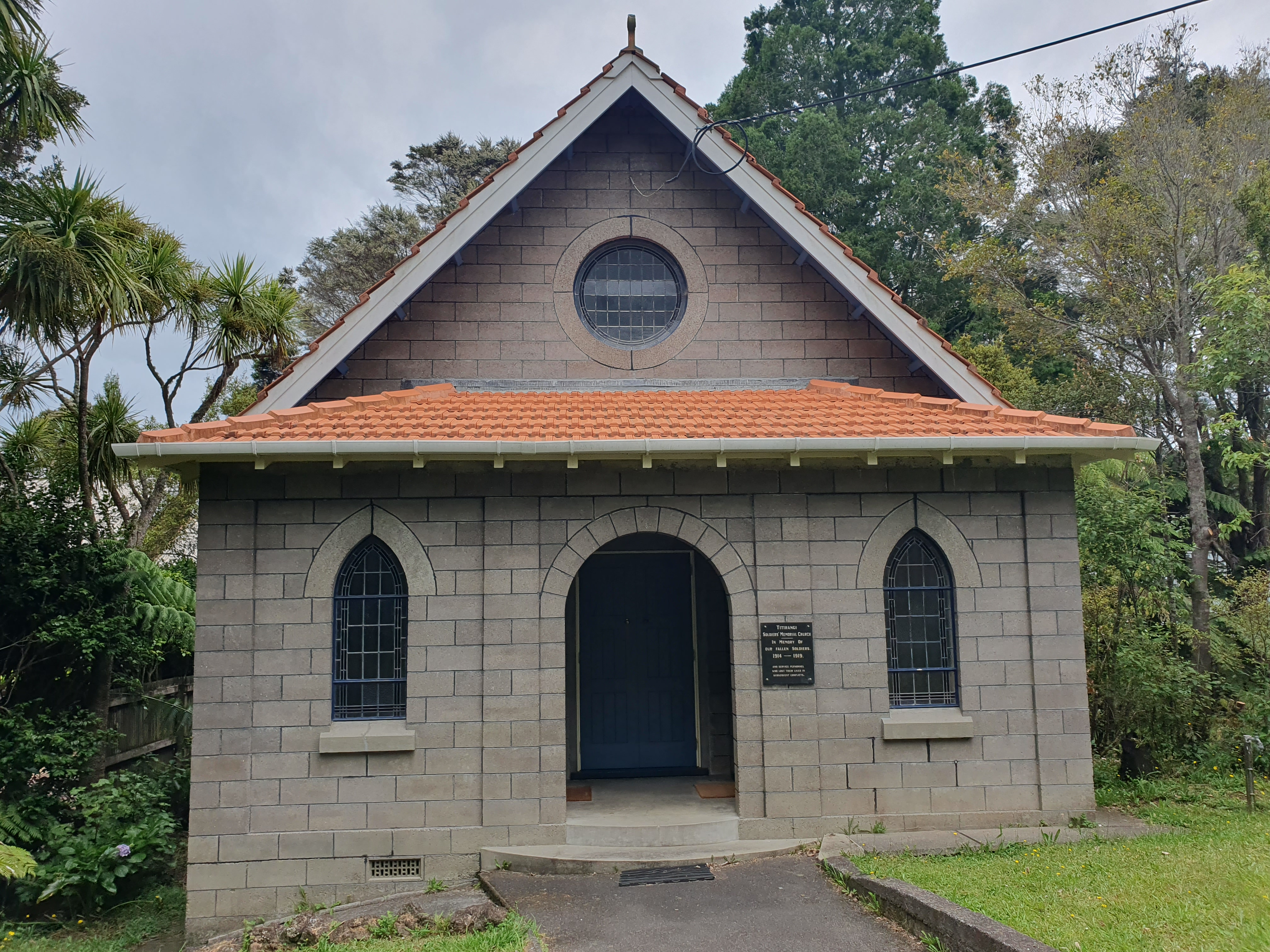
- Titirangi Soldier's Memorial Church
- Location: Titirangi, Auckland
- Address: 116 Park Road, Titirangi, Auckland
- Country: New Zealand
- Denomination: Nondenominational
- Previous denomination: Anglican and Presbyterian
- Website: https://titirangismchurch.nz/

History
- Dedication: To the Titirangi service personnel who lost their lives in the First World War and all subsequent conflicts

Architecture
- Completed: 18 May 1924
- Construction cost: £920 (1924)

Specifications
- Materials: Hollow concrete blocks, Timber, Marseilles tiles

The Titirangi Soldiers' Memorial Church is a historic war memorial and place of worship located in Titirangi, Auckland. Built to honour local soldiers who lost their lives in World War I, it is one of only two churches in New Zealand specifically designed as a war memorial. The church was conceived by Emily Bishop, whose two sons were among the fallen, and was intended as a non-denominational tribute to all soldiers, regardless of religious affiliation.

Funded entirely through community-led efforts, including fundraising events organized by local women, the church was officially opened on 18 May 1924, with New Zealand’s Governor-General, Lord Jellicoe, presiding over the ceremony. Over the years, the church grounds have been expanded and enhanced, including the addition of a lychgate and bell tower in 1940.

Initially shared by Anglican and Presbyterian congregations, the church has continued to serve as a place of worship and remembrance. It was granted Waitākere Heritage status in 1996 and rededicated in 1999 to honour Titirangi residents who lost their lives in later conflicts.

== History ==
=== Conception and purpose ===
The Titirangi Soldiers' Memorial Church is one of only two churches in New Zealand specifically designed as a war memorial for local soldiers who lost their lives in World War I. The vision for the church as a non-denominational war memorial came from Mrs. Emily Bishop, whose two sons were among those lost in the war. She believed the church should honour all fallen soldiers, regardless of religious affiliation.

=== Fundraising and planning ===
Funding for the memorial church was entirely community-driven, with local women leading fundraising efforts. The first major fund-raising event was a floral fete held at the Bishop residence, "Dunvegan," on 22 November 1919. Launched by Ethel Parr, wife of MP Sir Christopher James Parr, the event attracted a large number of attendees, including visitors from Auckland and its surrounding districts, as well as delegates from the Young Women's Christian Association convention in Auckland. On 9 December, the Titirangi Soldiers Memorial Church committee met to count the profits from the fete. They had raised over £300, which was placed in trust to serve as the foundation of the funds required to construct the church.

In January 1922, a significant meeting took place at Alec Bishop’s tea kiosk, marking an important step in the effort to establish a church in Titirangi. Unlike previous gatherings, this meeting also included two clergymen: Reverend Harold Robertson Jecks, the Anglican vicar of Avondale, and Reverend Angus MacDonald, the local Presbyterian minister. At the meeting, both ministers encouraged the community to continue their efforts toward building a church. In response, a small committee was formed to investigate construction costs, consisting of Nelson G. Hawkins, John MacFarlane, and Gus Bishop. By September 1922, Hawkins had offered land from his Ferndale Estate subdivision—near the corner of Park Road and South Titirangi Road—as a site for the church, an offer which the committee accepted. By October 1923, plans for the Church had been approved, with the estimated cost of the church was £850, of which £600 had already been raised through various community efforts.

=== Construction ===
Who designed the building is a matter of debate. Architect Herbert Clinton Savage offered his services to design the Titirangi Soldiers’ Memorial Church in 1922, a proposal that was accepted by the church committee. However, at the 1974 anniversary of the church, another individual, Mr. Souster, was credited as the architect, creating a discrepancy in historical records. The reason for this inconsistency remains unclear.

The construction of the Titirangi Soldiers' Memorial Church was carried out by several contractors, each responsible for different aspects of the build. The contract for the concrete block construction was awarded to Kershaw Brothers, while Titirangi local Harry Jenkin oversaw the timber work and interior finishing. The firm of Winstone Ltd supplied and installed the tiled roof. The concrete blocks used in the church were produced at the Kershaw Brothers' yard in New Lynn. Although hollow concrete block construction became widespread in New Zealand after the Second World War, it had first been introduced in Wellington in 1904. However, its use in the Titirangi Soldiers' Memorial Church was an uncommon choice for a church building at the time.

Construction benefited from local volunteer labour, however it soon became evident that the Trust did not have enough funds needed to cover the entire cost of building. To cover the shortfall, a £300 loan was secured from the Auckland Savings Bank. The total cost of the church amounted to £920, while the solid rimu seats, generously donated, were valued at £140. The debt was gradually repaid through community donations and by 13 December 1929, the church was entirely debt-free.

== Opening ==
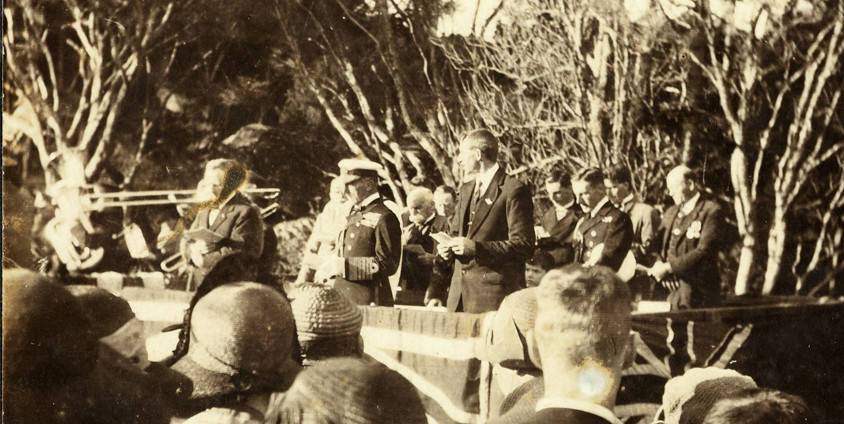
Stereograph of a scene during the opening ceremony. Governor General, Lord Jellicoe is seated in the centre

The Titirangi Soldiers' Memorial Church was officially opened on 18 May 1924, marking the establishment of the first church in the settlement. The opening ceremony, held on a Sunday afternoon, was attended by a large crowd, including returned soldiers, local residents, and dignitaries. The Governor-General of New Zealand, Lord Jellicoe, presided over the event, accompanied by his son George Jellicoe.

The devotional service was conducted by Reverend H. R. Jecks, vicar of Avondale, and Lieutenant-Colonel Angus MacDonald, minister at the New Lynn Presbyterian Church. Music for the occasion was provided by the Temperance Guards' Band.

In his speech, Lord Jellicoe stated that there could be no better memorial than the church itself, where worshippers would always be reminded of the sacrifice of Christ as well as the young men of Titirangi who gave their lives in service of the Empire. He expressed Their Majesties’ deep sympathy on behalf of King George V and Queen Mary to all those in the community who had lost loved ones in the war. As a symbolic gesture, Nelson Hawkins, chairman of the church trustees, presented Lord Jellicoe with a silver key engraved with a New Zealand fern. That evening, the first service was held in the new church, conducted jointly by Reverend Jecks and Reverend MacDonald before a large congregation.

== Roll of Honour ==
At the time of its construction, the Titirangi Soldiers' Memorial Church did not have sufficient funds to erect a Roll of Honour. However, through continued community fundraising efforts, a black granite plaque designed by sculptor William Henry Feldon was unveiled by Governor-General Sir Charles Fergusson on 18 April 1926. In his address, the Governor-General spoke of the three key aspects of remembrance: thankfulness, commemoration, and dedication. He emphasized the importance of honouring the sacrifices of the fallen, educating future generations about their service, and carrying forward the values of duty and self-sacrifice.

The names inscribed on the plaque are:

=== P. T. Armstrong ===
Rifleman Percy Thomas Armstrong served in the New Zealand Rifle Brigade, 3rd Battalion, B Company. Living in Mount Albert, Auckland, he was the son of Leonard John Armstrong Eliza Jane Armstrong, who resided in the Auckland suburb of Morningside. Before enlisting, he worked as a packer.

Armstrong joined the New Zealand Expeditionary Force, 29th Reinforcements, and embarked from Wellington on 13 August 1917 aboard the SS Mokoia. He was deployed to the Western Front, where he served in France. He was killed in action on 9 September 1918 and is buried at Metz-en-Couture Communal Cemetery in France. He was 26 years old at the time of his death.

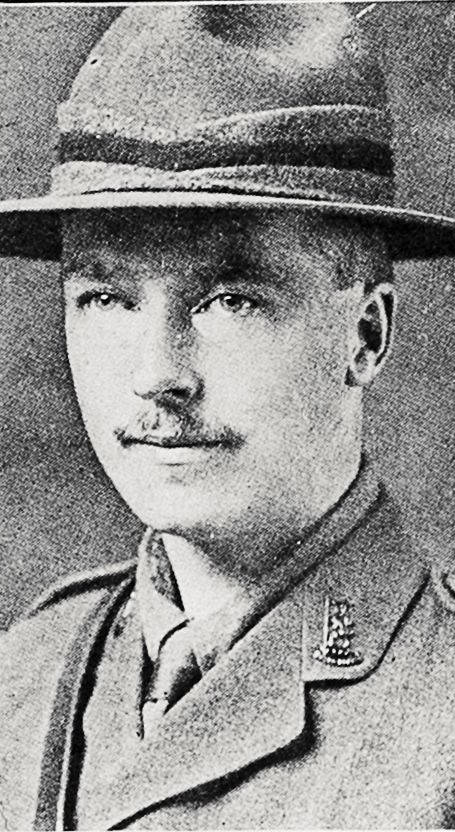
Portrait of Lieutenant J J (Jack) Bishop of Titirangi - 1917

=== J. J. Bishop ===
2nd Lieutenant John Joseph Bishop was born on 7 July 1893 in Titirangi, Auckland, the eldest son of John Joseph Bishop and Emily Jemima Surman. He attended Auckland Grammar School, matriculating in 1910, before training as a teacher at Auckland University College. He later became head teacher at Kaitaia School but enlisted for war service on 11 December 1915.

Bishop entered Trentham Camp as a Corporal and was promoted to Sergeant in the New Zealand Rifle Brigade before departing for England with the 13th Reinforcements on 29 May 1916. Arriving in France in September 1916, he joined the 4th Battalion, Rifle Brigade, seeing action on the Somme. After being hospitalized with influenza, he returned to duty and was selected for Officer training in England in April 1917. Commissioned as a 2nd Lieutenant, he was transferred to the 1st Battalion, Otago Infantry Regiment, rejoining the front lines in France in June 1917.

On 12 October 1917, during the attack on Bellevue Spur at Passchendaele, Bishop led his men into battle but was killed in action. He was 24 years old. Bishop has no known grave, and his name is commemorated on the Tyne Cot Memorial in Belgium. Less than a year later, his younger brother William Bishop was also killed in action.

=== W. N. C. Bishop ===
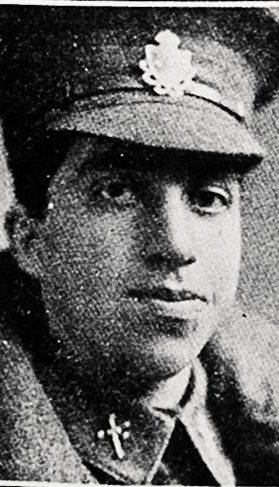
Portrait of Private William Bishop - 1918

William Norman Clarke Bishop was born on 6 February 1897 in Auckland, the third son of John Joseph Bishop and Emily Bishop. Following his schooling, he joined the New Zealand Post and Telegraph Service, working in Wellington before returning to Auckland. On his 20th birthday, he enlisted for war service and was assigned to the 28th Reinforcements of the Auckland Infantry Regiment. After training, he departed New Zealand on 14 July 1917, arriving in France in October 1917.

Bishop was later transferred to the 2nd Battalion, Auckland Infantry Regiment, serving on the Somme during the German Spring Offensive. On 23 May 1918, while stationed in the front-line trenches, he was killed in action during a pre-dawn German trench raid, which was preceded by heavy artillery fire. He was 21 years old at the time of his death and was buried in Euston Road Cemetery, Colincamps, France. His death came less than a year after his older brother, John Joseph Bishop, making him the second son of the Bishop family lost in the war.

=== J. C. Burns ===
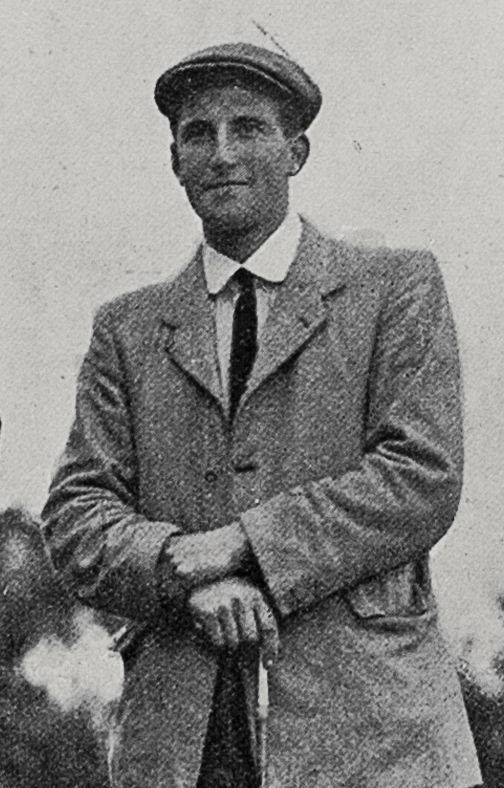
J. C Burns at the Amateur Golf Championship in Auckland - September 1909

Sergeant-Major John Charles Burns was born in London and immigrated to Auckland with his family as an infant. He attended King’s College, where he excelled in football and cricket, and later joined his family’s business, John Burns and Sons, Ltd., eventually becoming a director. Burns was also a director of the Onehunga Woollen Mills, Ltd., a Governor of King’s College, and served as president of the King's College Old Boys' Association.

Active in business and civic life, Burns was president of the Commercial Travellers’ and Warehousemen’s Association in 1915 and briefly served as Acting-Consul for Belgium in Auckland. He was also a skilled golfer, winning the championship of the Auckland Golf Club and finishing as runner-up in the New Zealand national golf championship.

Burns enlisted for war service 15 months before his death and served in a training capacity at military camps in New Zealand. Although scheduled for deployment to the front, his departure was repeatedly delayed due to his role in training new recruits. While on final leave in Auckland, he fell ill with what was believed to be a minor cold. However, upon arriving in Wellington, his condition worsened, and he was admitted to Wellington Hospital Burns had contracted cerebrospinal meningitis. He died at Wellington Hospital on 23 August 1918.

=== W. Carn^{[1]} ===
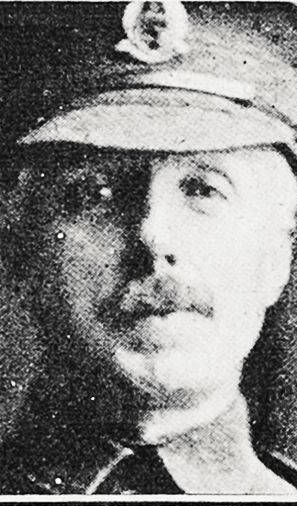
Portrait of Private C. N. Green - July 1917

Rifleman William Carn served in the 3rd Battalion, New Zealand Rifle Brigade during World War I. A sugar worker by trade, Carn enlisted in the New Zealand Expeditionary Force and embarked from Wellington on 26 April 1917 aboard HMNZT 82 Pakeha as part of the New Zealand Rifle Brigade Reinforcements, H Company. After arriving in Europe, he was deployed to the Western Front, where he fought in France. On 10 September 1918, during the final months of the war, he died of wounds sustained in battle at the age of 24. He was buried at Euston Road Cemetery in Colincamps, France.

=== C. Green ===
A native of Birkenhead, Cheshire, England, Private Charles Noel Green immigrated to New Zealand 16 years before his death. He initially engaged in farming in Stratford, Taranaki, before relocating to New Lynn, where he lived for six years before enlisting.

Green joined the New Zealand Expeditionary Force, 13th Reinforcements, Auckland Infantry Battalion, A Company, and embarked from Wellington in late May 1916. After training, he was deployed to the front and later served in the 2nd Battalion, Auckland Infantry Regiment. On 9 June 1917, he died of wounds sustained in battle. He was laid to rest in Westhof Farm Cemetery near Ypres, Belgium. He was survived by his wife, Florence Green, of New Lynn, Auckland.

=== J. D. Hughes ===
Private James Douglas Hughes served in the 2nd Battalion, Auckland Infantry Regiment during World War I. Born in Auckland, he was the son of William and Mary Hughes of Wanganui. Before enlisting, he lived in New Lynn, Auckland, and was unmarried.

A volunteer, Hughes enlisted in the New Zealand Expeditionary Force and embarked from Wellington on 13 November 1915 aboard the Willochra as part of the 8th Reinforcements, Auckland Infantry Battalion. He initially served in Egypt before being sent to the Western Front. On 15 September 1916, during the Battle of the Somme, Hughes was killed in action at the age of 23. He has no known grave and is commemorated on the Caterpillar Valley Memorial, Longueval, France.

=== G. Pitcher ===
Gunner George Pitcher served in the New Zealand Field Artillery during World War I. A native of Titirangi, Auckland, he was the son of Mrs. M. Pitcher of Greenhithe, Auckland. He was unmarried at the time of his enlistment. On 23 August 1917, Pitcher died of wounds sustained in battle and was laid to rest at Trois Arbres Cemetery in Steenwerck, France.

=== J. Rankin ===
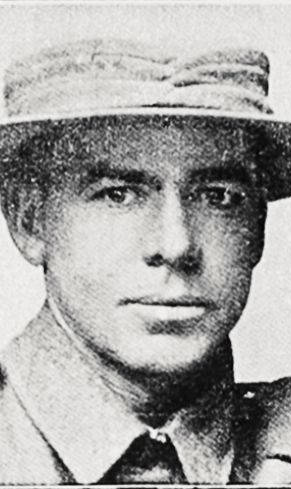
Portrait of Sgt. James Rankin, D.C.M - January 1917

Sergeant James Rankin, D.C.M. was born and educated in Rockhampton, Queensland, before moving to Auckland, New Zealand, where he trained as a coachsmith. He served his apprenticeship with the coachsmiths firm Geo and Potter of Auckland. Rankin was a keen sportsman, competing as a lightweight rower for the Waitemata Boating Club.

Before enlisting, Rankin had military experience as a sergeant in No. 1 NZ Natives Company, a volunteer military unit in New Zealand. Rankin enlisted in August 1914 and initially served aboard the examination ship Lady Roberts. He later joined the signaling division of a Howitzer Battery as a non-commissioned officer with an early reinforcement draft. Eager to serve on the front lines, Rankin voluntarily resigned his rank while in Egypt and departed with the Main Body as a private.

He arrived at Gallipoli on 26 April 1915 and on 6 August, during the Battle of Lone Pine, he demonstrated exceptional bravery when a telephone line was cut under enemy fire. Rankin volunteered to lay a new wire under heavy and continuous fire, restoring communication and allowing the battery commander to regain control of artillery bombardment. For this act of courage and skill, he was awarded the Distinguished Conduct Medal. After the evacuation of Gallipoli, Rankin was redeployed to France, where he re-earned his sergeant stripes. On 20 September 1916, at the age of 28, he was killed in action while serving with the New Zealand Field Artillery.

=== P. Rawlinson ===
Private Percival John Rawlinson was a farmer before enlisting in the New Zealand Expeditionary Force.

He embarked for service with the 20th Reinforcements (1st Draft), Auckland Infantry Battalion, A Company, departing from Wellington aboard the Port Lyttelton on 7 December 1916, though harbour records note the actual sailing date as 8 December 1916. Serving with the 1st Battalion, Auckland Infantry Regiment, Private Rawlinson was wounded in action and succumbed to his injuries on 18 October 1917, at the age of 21. He is buried at Nine Elms British Cemetery near Poperinge, Belgium.

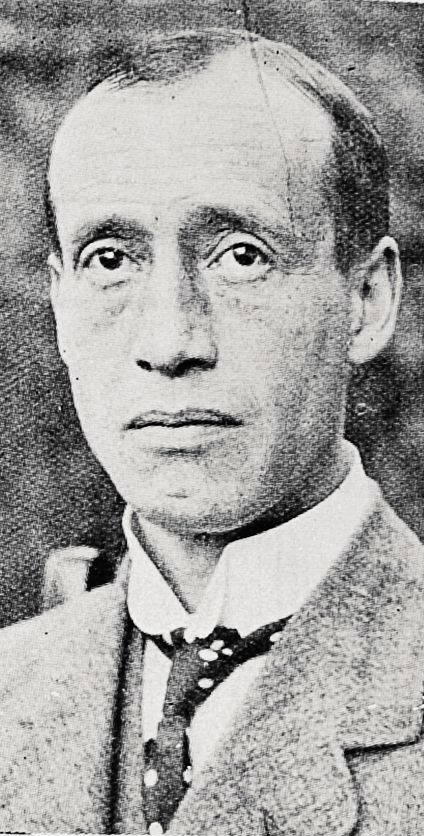
Portrait of Major T. C. Savage - May 1915

=== T. C. Savage ===
Major Thomas Charles Savage served in the New Zealand Medical Corps during World War I. Born in Burslem, Staffordshire, he was the son of Warwick and Mary Savage.

He later settled in Auckland, New Zealand, where he lived on Princes Street with his wife, Madeline Savage. After his arrival in 1902, Savage quickly earned a reputation as one of the most brilliant surgeons in New Zealand, specializing in consulting and operative work. In 1905, he was appointed an Honorary Surgeon at Auckland Hospital, a position he held until 1913, when he became the hospital’s Consulting Surgeon.

At the outbreak of the war, Savage was accepted for service at No. 2 Service Hospital, stationed at Port Koubba in Egypt. Savage embarked from New Zealand aboard the troopship Maunganui on 12 June 1915, arriving in Egypt on 22 July. Prior to reaching Egypt, Savage had contracted cerebro-spinal meningitis, from which he succumbed to on 14 August 1915. He was buried in the Cairo War Memorial Cemetery.

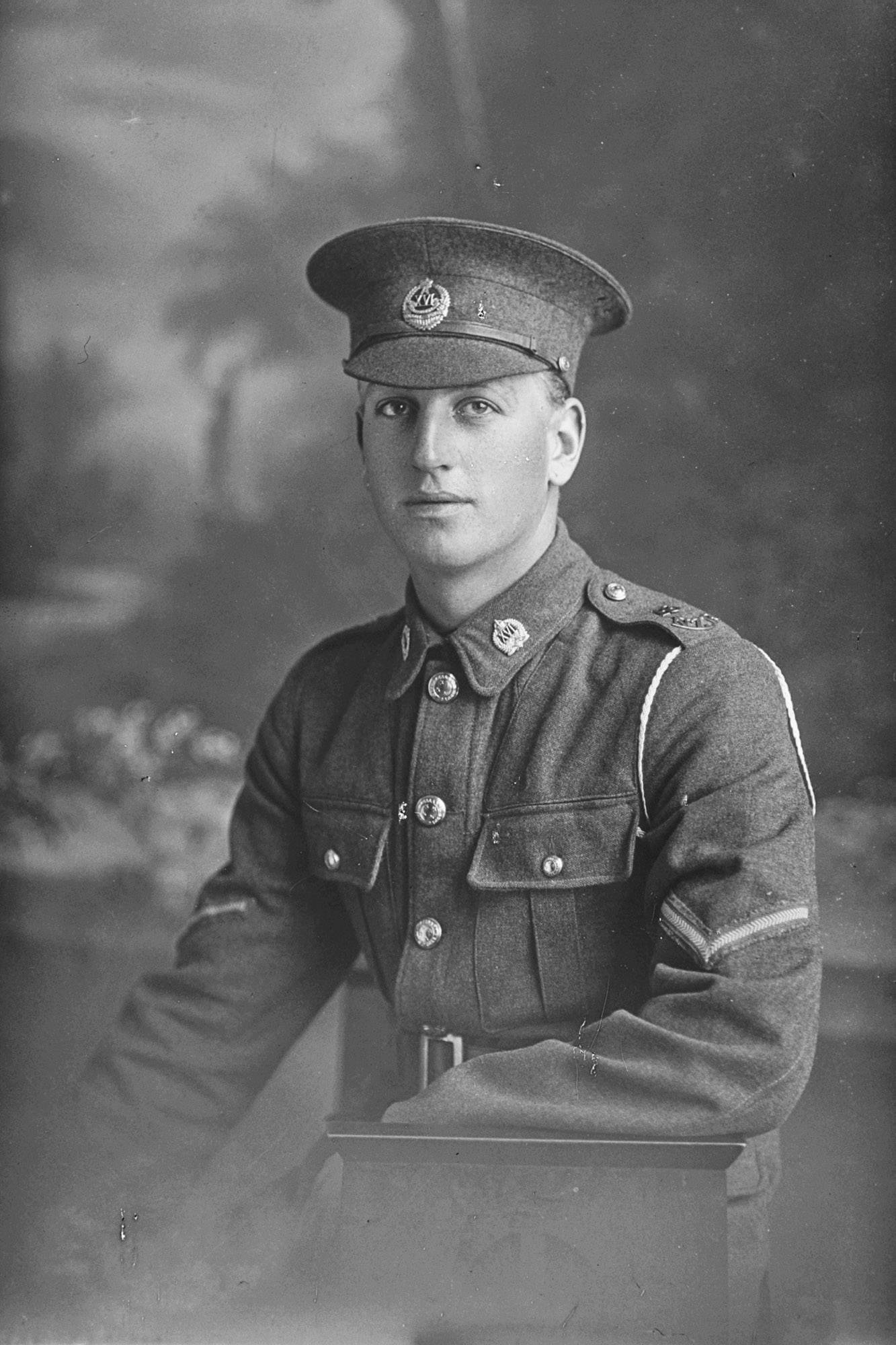
Half portrait of Corporal Clarence Victor Tarlin - 1916

=== C. V. Tarlin ===
Private Clarence Victor Tarlin served in the 2nd Battalion, Auckland Infantry Regiment during World War I. Born on 10 June 1897 in Auckland, he was the son of Alfred John Alexander Tarlin and Clara Brittain. He attended Auckland Grammar School before working as a labourer for the Auckland City Council Water Works. Living in Titirangi, he enlisted for war service on 2 May 1916. Prior to enlisting, Tarlin had served in the Auckland Mounted Regiment as a Territorial. Eager to join the war effort, he altered his birth year to 1896 to meet the age requirements.

Tarlin embarked for England on 19 August 1916, arriving on 25 October. While in Trentham Camp, he had been promoted to Corporal, but upon joining the 2nd Auckland Battalion in France on 3 December 1916, he reverted to the ranks. On 21 February 1917, Tarlin took part in a large-scale raid on German trenches, where he was severely wounded by a gunshot to the abdomen. Unable to be rescued by his comrades, he was captured by German forces. Initial reports on 1 May 1917, via the Dutch Legation in Berlin, confirmed that he was a prisoner of war. However, on 6 May, his status was updated to “Prisoner of War, wounded”, before official confirmation of his death on 22 February was received on 1 June 1917. Tarlin was buried in Lille Southern Cemetery, in France. He was 19 years old at the time of his death.

=== O. Yorke ===
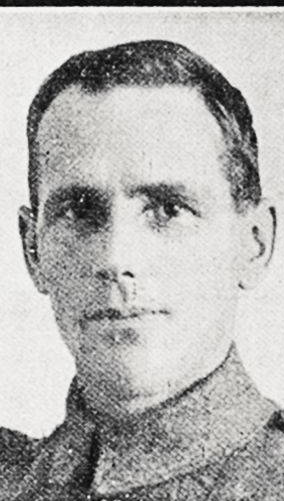
Portrait of Private Owen Yorke - August 1917

Private Owen Yorke served in the 2nd Battalion, Auckland Infantry Regiment during World War I. Born in Titirangi, he was the son of Joseph Owen and Mary Yorke of Kawakawa. Before enlisting, Yorke lived as a dairy farmer in Ruawai in Northern Wairoa. Yorke joined the Auckland Mounted Rifles and embarked from Auckland on 16 October 1914.

He served at Gallipoli, and following the evacuation, he was assigned to the Divisional Headquarters staff at Ismailia Camp in Egypt. When the New Zealand forces were deployed to France, he applied for and was granted a transfer to the infantry. On 21 February 1917, Private Yorke was killed in action at the age of 29. He was laid to rest at Pont-Du-Hem Military Cemetery, La Gorgue, France.

=== T. J. A. Groves ===
A year after the Memorial plaque was unveiled, a second memorial tablet was added to honour another local soldier, Thomas John Albert "Tom" Groves of the New Zealand Tunnelling Company.

Born and raised in Titirangi, Tom had worked as a warder at Tokanui Mental Hospital before enlisting. While on leave in London in 1917, he married May Waxham, who had family ties to the de Brabandere family of Titirangi. After the war, Tom and May settled on South Titirangi Road, where they farmed and raised their three children. Groves died on 5 November 1925 due to tuberculosis and cardiac failure, conditions attributed his war service. He is buried in Waikumete Cemetery.

== Development and Legacy (1925–Present) ==
Since its opening in 1924, the church had hosted nondenominational services, with the Anglican vicar leading worship one Sunday and the Presbyterian minister the next. An interdenominational Sunday school was also held each Sunday morning, providing a place of learning and faith for local children.

In 1927, the Church saw the laying of a concrete block path and the construction of rustic style fencing, with native trees and ferns planted to enhance the grounds in 1931.

Architect J. Park designed plans for a new gateway to the church, intended to house its first bell, which was imported from England and sponsored by J. Burns & Co. The bell was dedicated on 19 May 1940 by Reverend H. H. Bedford, marking the 16th anniversary of the chapel’s opening. The first person to ring the new bell was Emily Bishop, the original driving force behind the church project. Initially, the bell was hand-rung by pulling a rope in a structure over the gate, but in later years, it was played electronically. In 2006, the original bell was stolen and was later replaced at considerable cost with a smaller bell, cast by Bettacast Foundry in Avondale.

The church was shared by both Anglicans and Presbyterians until both congregations outgrew the space and relocated in the 1980s—the St. Francis Anglican Church moved to 96 Park Road, while the Titirangi Presbyterian Church relocated to 234 Atkinson Road. Since 1991, the Traditional Anglican Communion has held regular Sunday morning services in the church, while the Community of St. Columba hosts monthly Celtic, Christian, and Contemplative services.

The building was granted Waitakere Heritage status in 1996 and in 1999, the Church was further dedicated to those Titirangi service personnel who lost their lives in subsequent conflicts.

== Gallery ==
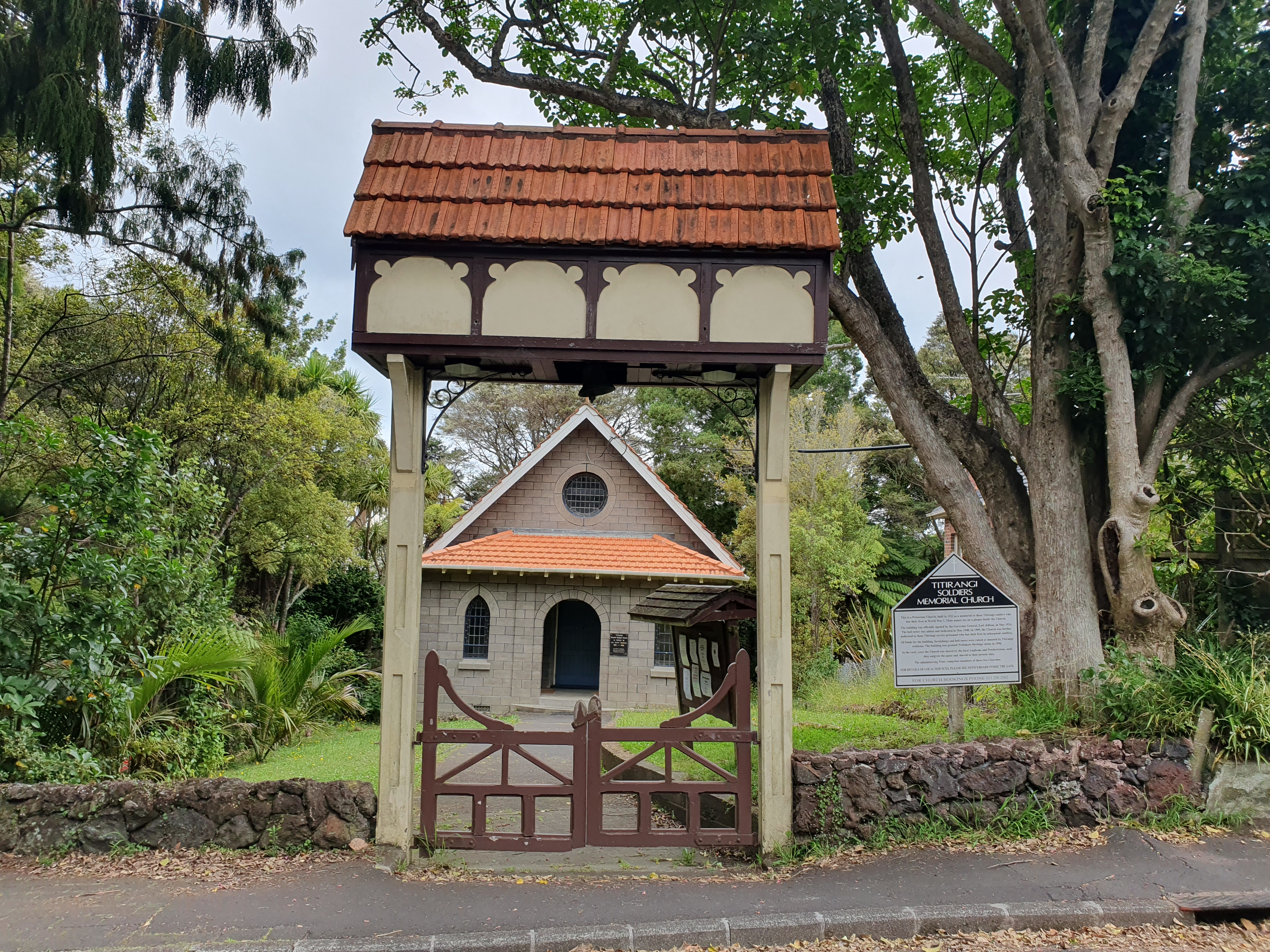
Front Exterior of Titirangi Soldiers' Memorial Church

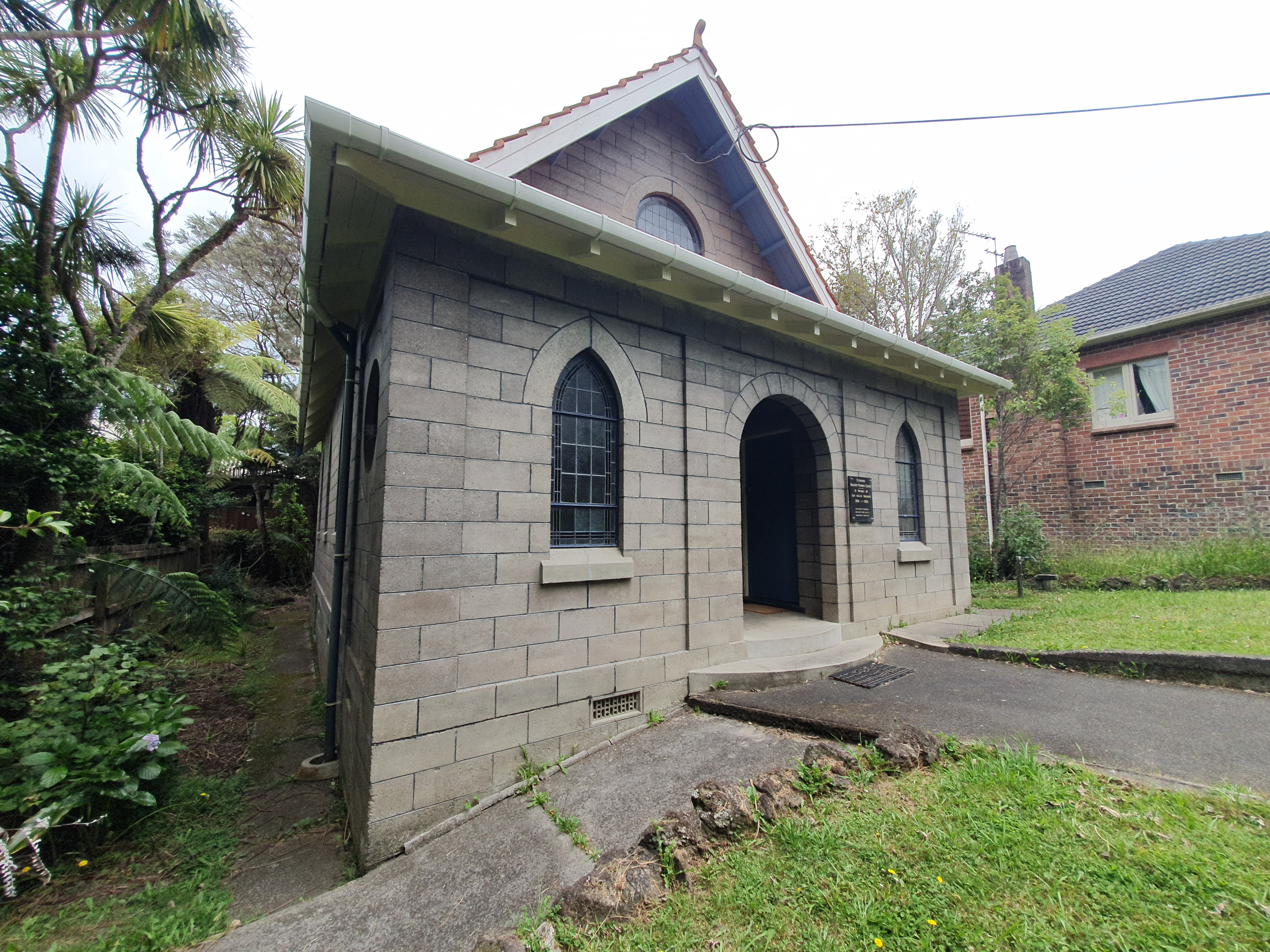
Titirangi Soldiers' Memorial Church - Another Angle

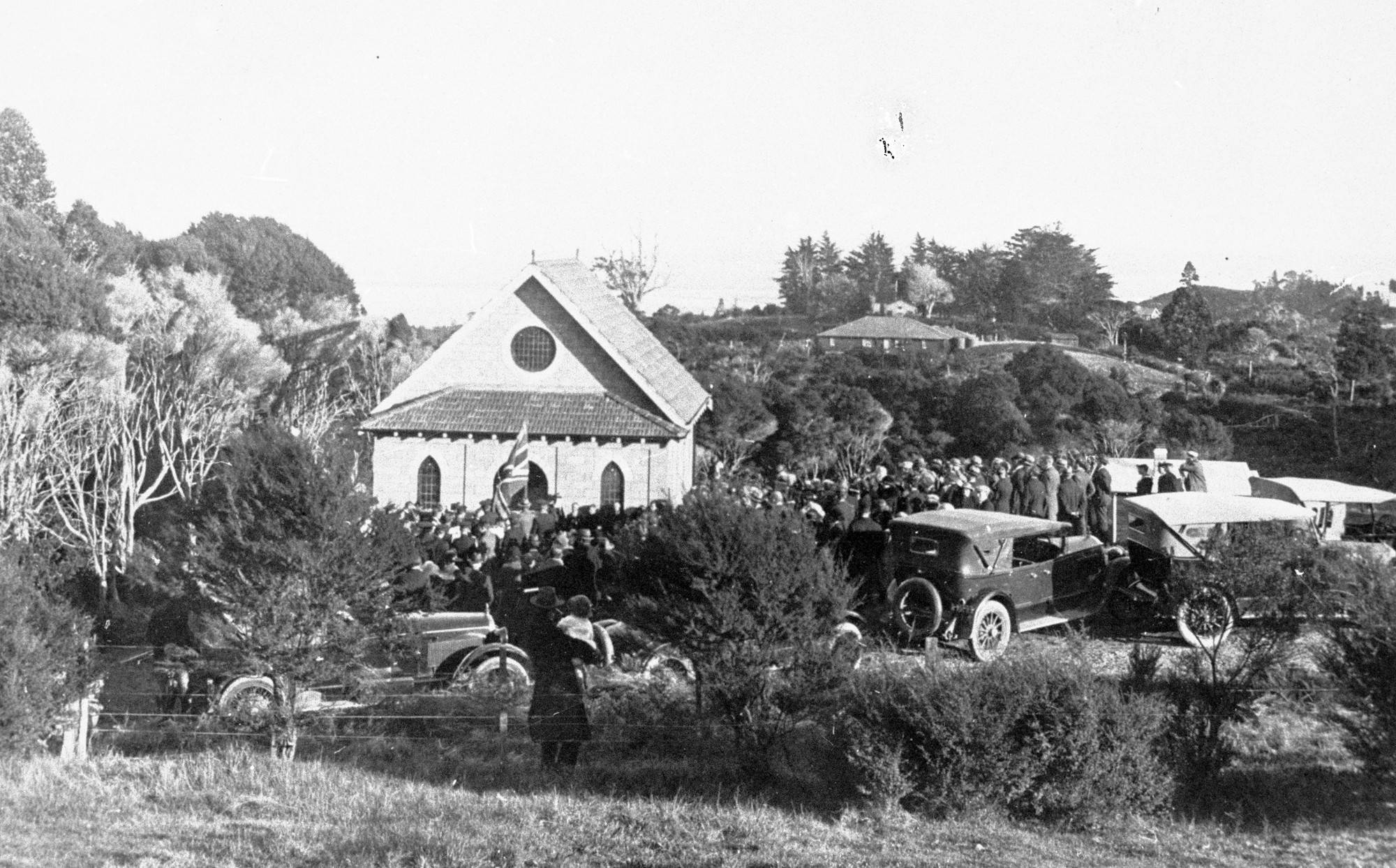
View of people and cars outside the Soldiers Memorial Church in Park Road - November 1924

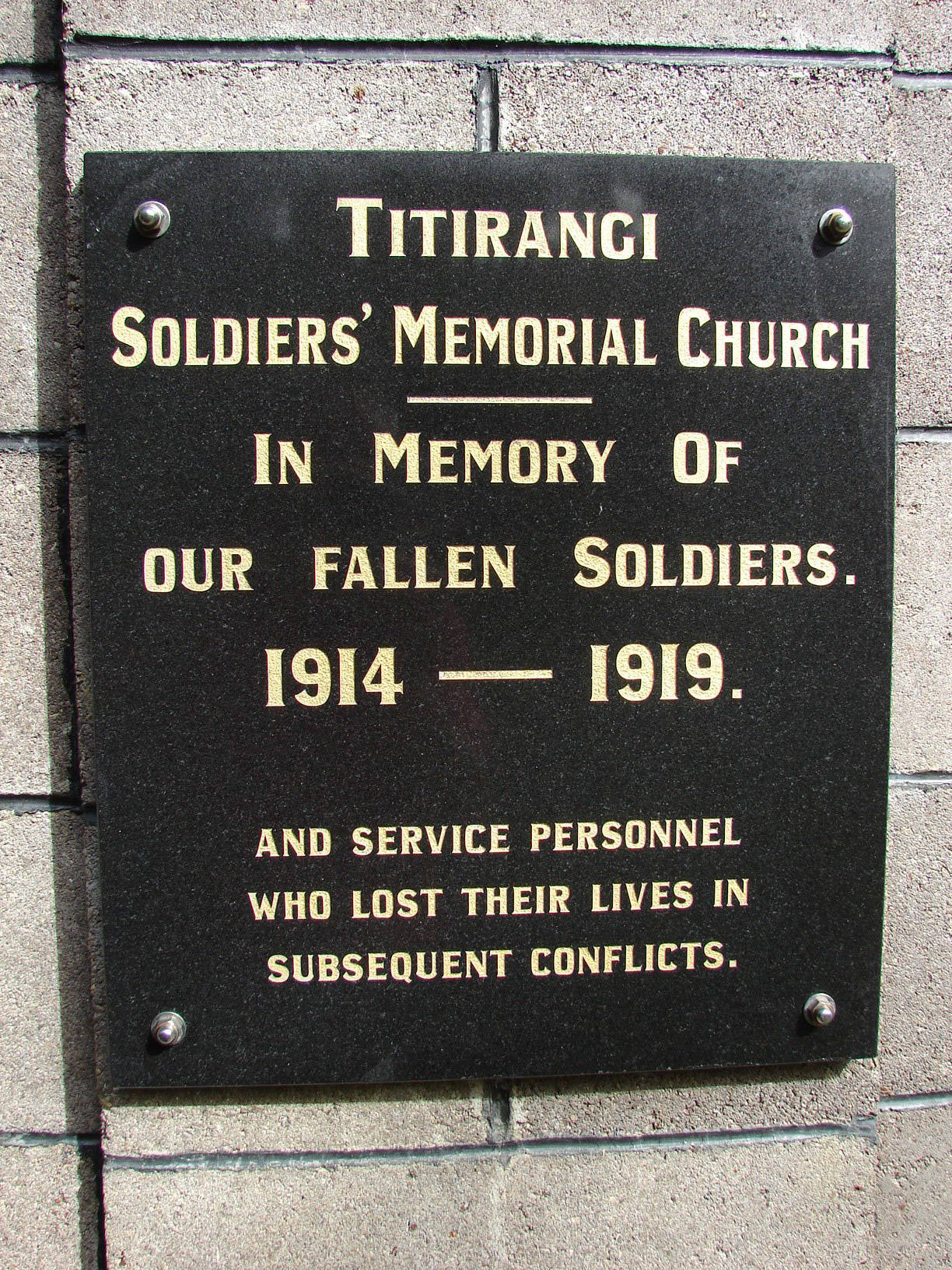
Memorial plaque at the main entrance of the Titirangi Soldiers' Memorial Church

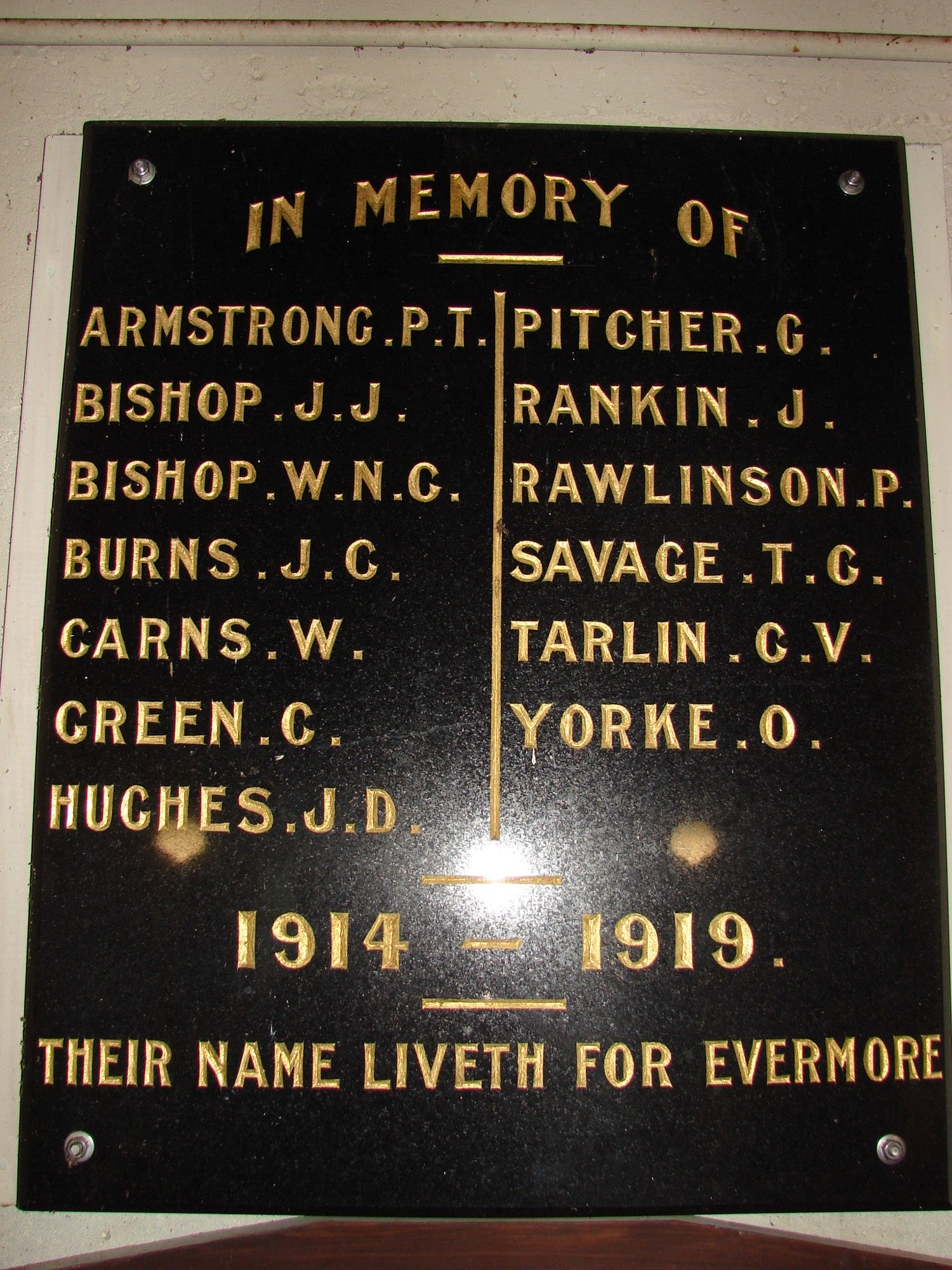
Tablet bearing the names of the 13 local men who died in the first World War

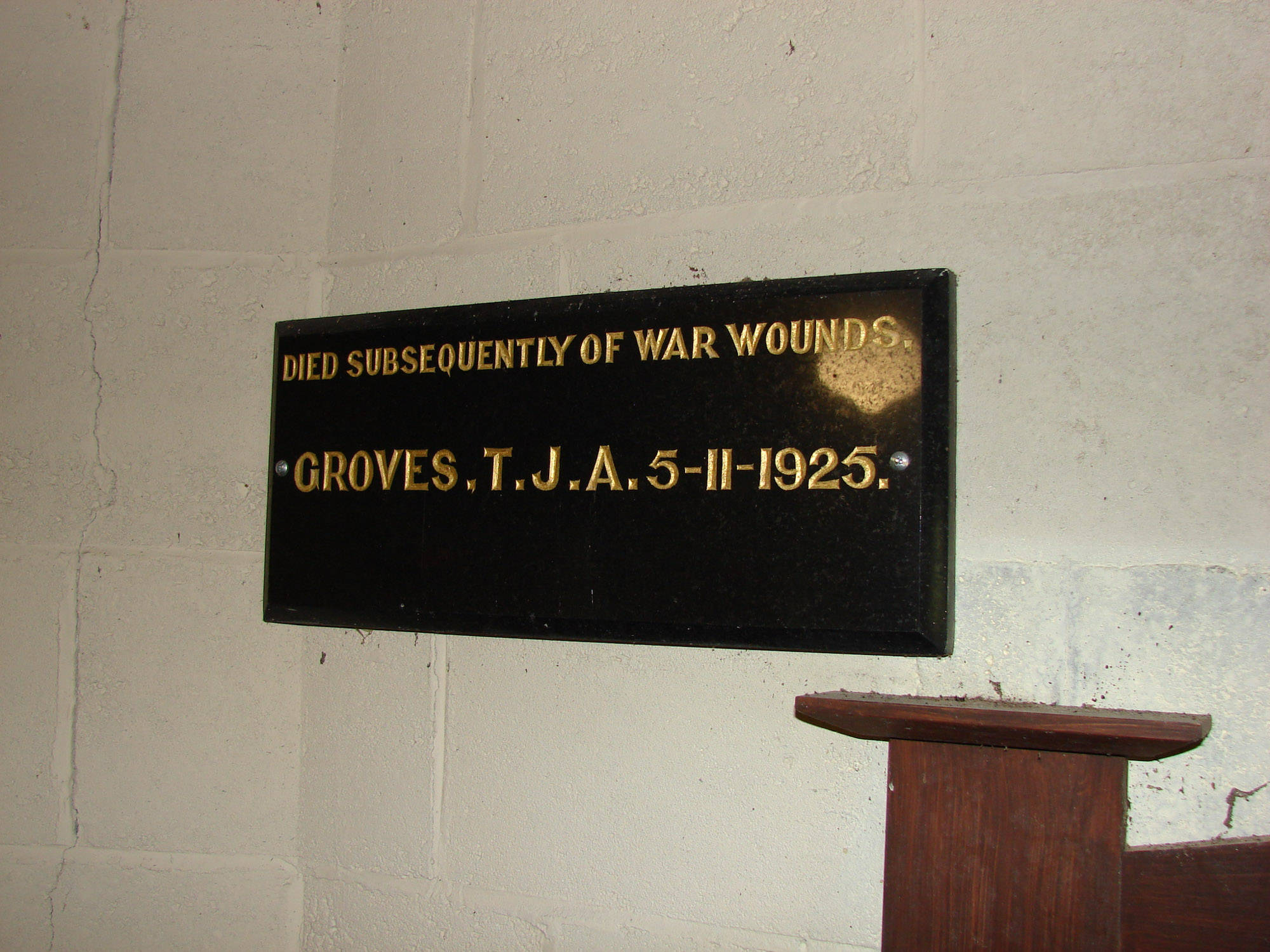
A plaque honouring T.J.A. Groves, who died of war wounds on 5 November 1925

== Notes ==
^{1} On the Church's memorial tablet, Carn's surname is spelt Carns. All other sources of information, such as the engraving on the Titirangi War Memorial and Auckland War Memorial Museum Online Cenotaph, spell William's surname as "Carn".

== Bibliography ==
- Coney, Sandra (2017). Gone West - Great War Memorials of Waitakere and their Soldiers. Protect Piha Heritage Society Inc. ISBN 978-0-473-40520-5.
- Drummond, Fiona (27 September 2021). "Titirangi Soldiers' Memorial Church nears 100 years". The Fringe. p. 18.
