= William Willett (disambiguation) =

William Willett (1856–1915) was an English builder and promoter of daylight saving time.

William Willett may also refer to:

- William Willett Jr. (1869–1938), U.S. Representative
- William Willett (Royal Navy officer) (1919–1976)

== See also ==
- William Willet, American artist
- William Willetts (disambiguation)
