= Waima =

- Suburb
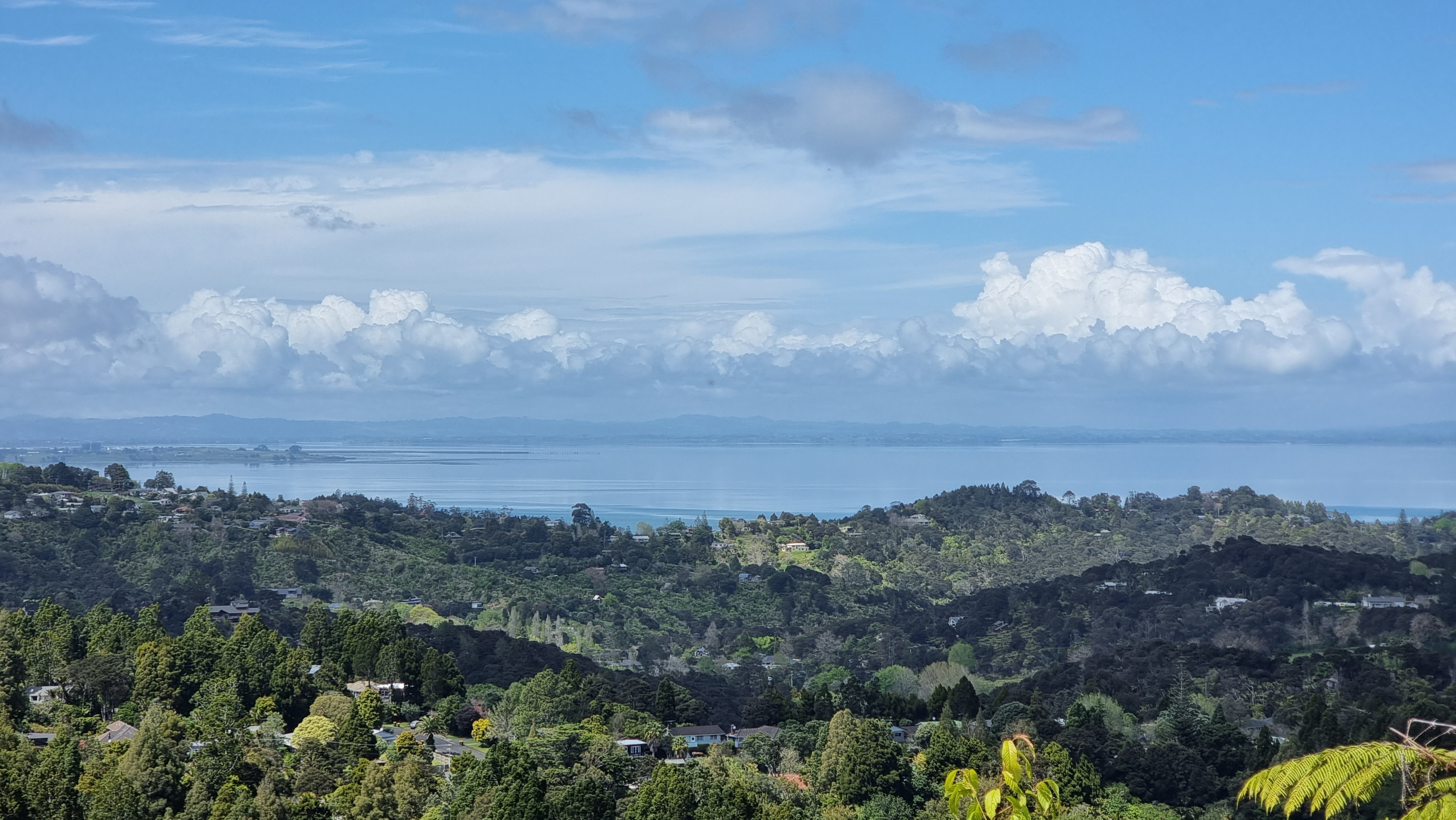
- Interactive map of Waima
- Country: New Zealand
- City: Auckland
- Local authority: Auckland Council
- Electoral ward: Waitākere ward
- Local board: Waitākere Ranges Local Board

Area
  - Land: 348 ha (860 acres)

Population (June 2025)
  - Total: 2,720
  - Density: 782/km^{2} (2,020/sq mi)

	Glen Eden	Konini
	Waima	Titirangi
Woodlands Park

Waima is a suburb of West Auckland, New Zealand. It is under the local governance of the Auckland Council. The majority of the modest population is clustered around the comparatively prominent Waima superette, situated just off the main arterial road Woodlands Park Road, on such streets as Waima Crescent, Hollywood Avenue, Boylan Road and Rimutaka Place. The central "hub" could be considered Waima reserve, which consists of various public amenities such as a playground, basketball court, toilets and a sport field.

To the north-west, Waima is bordered by popular walking track and Lower Nihotipu Reservoir pipeline route "Exhibition Drive". Two water treatment stations and holding tanks service Auckland city's water supply from locations on Woodlands Park Road. Waima extends east to Tainui Road and the Auckland Centennial Memorial Park and the cul de sac of Rimutaka Place represents Waima's southernmost point.

== History ==
In the early 20th century, the area was a part of McEldowney fruit farm, owned by an Irish immigrant family.

== Demographics ==
Waima-Woodlands Park statistical area covers 3.48 km^{2} (1.34 sq mi) and had an estimated population of 2,720 as of June 2025, with a population density of 782 people per km^{2}.

Historical population
Year	Pop.	±% p.a.
2006	2,463	—
2013	2,526	+0.36%
2018	2,682	+1.21%
2023	2,634	−0.36%

Waima-Woodlands Park had a population of 2,634 in the 2023 New Zealand census, a decrease of 48 people (−1.8%) since the 2018 census, and an increase of 108 people (4.3%) since the 2013 census. There were 1,290 males, 1,335 females and 12 people of other genders in 873 dwellings. 3.9% of people identified as LGBTIQ+. The median age was 40.1 years (compared with 38.1 years nationally). There were 627 people (23.8%) aged under 15 years, 396 (15.0%) aged 15 to 29, 1,338 (50.8%) aged 30 to 64, and 273 (10.4%) aged 65 or older.

People could identify as more than one ethnicity. The results were 90.2% European (Pākehā); 9.3% Māori; 4.2% Pasifika; 9.9% Asian; 1.7% Middle Eastern, Latin American and African New Zealanders (MELAA); and 1.4% other, which includes people giving their ethnicity as "New Zealander". English was spoken by 97.8%, Māori language by 1.5%, Samoan by 0.2%, and other languages by 14.4%. No language could be spoken by 1.6% (e.g. too young to talk). New Zealand Sign Language was known by 0.7%. The percentage of people born overseas was 28.2, compared with 28.8% nationally.

Religious affiliations were 17.8% Christian, 0.5% Hindu, 0.7% Islam, 0.3% Māori religious beliefs, 1.0% Buddhist, 0.7% New Age, 0.2% Jewish, and 1.1% other religions. People who answered that they had no religion were 69.7%, and 8.0% of people did not answer the census question.

Of those at least 15 years old, 768 (38.3%) people had a bachelor's or higher degree, 957 (47.7%) had a post-high school certificate or diploma, and 288 (14.3%) people exclusively held high school qualifications. The median income was $57,600, compared with $41,500 nationally. 507 people (25.3%) earned over $100,000 compared to 12.1% nationally. The employment status of those at least 15 was that 1,167 (58.1%) people were employed full-time, 324 (16.1%) were part-time, and 42 (2.1%) were unemployed.

== Education ==
Most young residents attend nearby Woodlands Park Primary School or Titirangi Primary School and Glen Eden Intermediate school. The local State secondary schools are Green Bay High School, Kelston Boys High School and Kelston Girls High School. Catholic students usually commute by bus, or train from Glen Eden or New Lynn to Marist College (girls) or St Peter's College (boys).
