= Waitākere Ranges Local Board =

Coordinates: 36.911017569°S 174.651728227°E

Waitākere Ranges Local Board Te Poari ā-Rohe o Te Ika Whenua o Waitākere
- Local board of Auckland Council
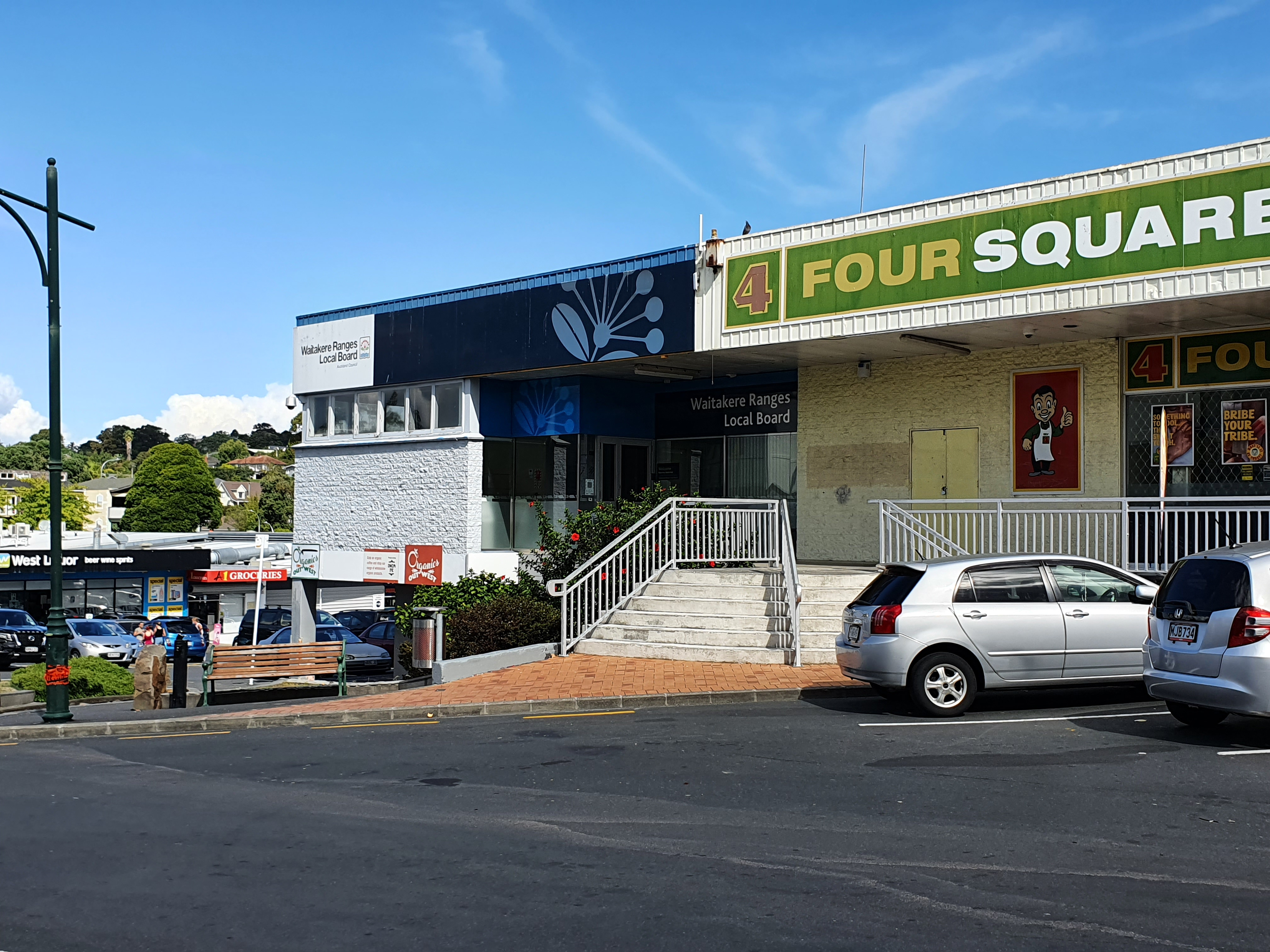
- Waitākere Ranges Local Board Office next to a Four Square in Glen Eden

- Country: New Zealand
- Region: Auckland
- Territorial authority: Auckland Council
- Ward: Waitākere Ward
- Legislated: 2010

Area
  - Land: 305.75 km^{2} (118.05 sq mi)

Population (June 2025)
  - Total: 56,900
  - Density: 186/km^{2} (482/sq mi)

Local Board Members

Leadership
- Chairperson: Mark Allen, Future West
- Deputy Chairperson: Greg Presland, Future West

Structure
- Seats: 6
- Political groups: Future West (5); WestWards (1)
- Length of term: 3 years

Elections
- Last election: 2025
- Next election: 2028

Meeting place
- 39 Glenmall Place, Glen Eden

Waitākere Ranges Local Board is one of the 21 local boards of the Auckland Council, and is one of the two boards overseen by the council's Waitākere Ward councillors.

The board's administrative area includes the suburbs of Titirangi, Glen Eden, Konini and Swanson and the towns of Te Henga (Bethells Beach), Piha, Karekare, Huia and Laingholm, and covers the area from Waitākere Ranges to O'Neill Bay. The total population residing in the board's area, in the 2013 New Zealand census, was 48,396.

The board is governed by six board members elected at-large. The inaugural members were elected in the nationwide 2010 local elections, coinciding with the introduction of the Auckland Council.

== Geography ==
The Waitākere Ranges local board area includes the Waitākere Ranges and surrounds. Laingholm, Waima, Titirangi, Oratia, Glen Eden and Sunnyvale are located to the east of the ranges. Henderson Valley, Waitakere, Swanson are located to the north. Bethells Beach, Piha and Whatipu are located on the West Coast.

== Demographics ==
Waitākere Ranges Local Board Area covers 305.75 km^{2} (118.05 sq mi) and had an estimated population of 56,900 as of June 2025, with a population density of 186 people per km^{2}.

Historical population
Year	Pop.	±% p.a.
2006	45,498	—
2013	48,399	+0.89%
2018	52,095	+1.48%
2023	53,898	+0.68%

Waitākere Ranges had a population of 53,898 in the 2023 New Zealand census, an increase of 1,803 people (3.5%) since the 2018 census, and an increase of 5,499 people (11.4%) since the 2013 census. There were 26,757 males, 26,874 females and 270 people of other genders in 18,150 dwellings. 3.8% of people identified as LGBTIQ+. The median age was 37.9 years (compared with 38.1 years nationally). There were 11,058 people (20.5%) aged under 15 years, 9,702 (18.0%) aged 15 to 29, 26,610 (49.4%) aged 30 to 64, and 6,525 (12.1%) aged 65 or older.

People could identify as more than one ethnicity. The results were 70.0% European (Pākehā); 13.8% Māori; 13.2% Pasifika; 17.4% Asian; 2.5% Middle Eastern, Latin American and African New Zealanders (MELAA); and 2.1% other, which includes people giving their ethnicity as "New Zealander". English was spoken by 95.5%, Māori language by 2.6%, Samoan by 3.3%, and other languages by 18.6%. No language could be spoken by 2.3% (e.g. too young to talk). New Zealand Sign Language was known by 0.6%. The percentage of people born overseas was 31.4, compared with 28.8% nationally.

Religious affiliations were 27.9% Christian, 4.0% Hindu, 2.0% Islam, 0.7% Māori religious beliefs, 1.2% Buddhist, 0.6% New Age, 0.1% Jewish, and 1.7% other religions. People who answered that they had no religion were 55.0%, and 7.0% of people did not answer the census question.

Of those at least 15 years old, 13,344 (31.1%) people had a bachelor's or higher degree, 20,646 (48.2%) had a post-high school certificate or diploma, and 8,850 (20.7%) people exclusively held high school qualifications. The median income was $48,500, compared with $41,500 nationally. 6,975 people (16.3%) earned over $100,000 compared to 12.1% nationally. The employment status of those at least 15 was that 23,640 (55.2%) people were employed full-time, 5,934 (13.9%) were part-time, and 1,335 (3.1%) were unemployed.

== 2025-2028 term ==
The current board members for the 2025–2028 term, elected at the 2025 local elections, are:

Name	Affiliation	Position
Mark Allen	Future West	Chairperson
Greg Presland	Future West	Deputy Chairperson
Michelle Lucke	Future West	Board member
Hannah Slade	Future West	Board member
Allan Geddes	WestWards	Board member
Jess Rose	Future West	Board member

== 2022–2025 term ==
The board members for the 2022–2025 term, elected at the 2022 local elections, were:

Name	Ticket (if any)	Position
Greg Presland	Future West	Chairperson
Michelle Clayton	WestWards	Deputy Chairperson
Sandra Coney	Future West	Board member
Mark Allen	Future West	Board member
Liz Manley	Future West	Board member
Linda Potauaine	WestWards	Board member

== 2019–2022 term ==
The 2019–2022 Board members were:

Name	Ticket (if any)	Position
Saffron Toms	Future West	Chairperson
Greg Presland	Future West	Deputy Chairperson
Michelle Clayton	WestWards	Board member
Sandra Coney	Future West	Board member
Mark Allen	Future West	Board member
Ken Turner	WestWards	Board member

== 2019 election results ==
1. PRESLAND, Greg Future West 6556

2. TURNER, Ken - WestWards 6242

3. CONEY, Sandra - Future West 6067

4. TOMS, Saffron - Future West 5603

5. ALLEN, Mark - Future West 5448

6. CLAYTON, Michelle WestWards-Independent 5350

HENDERSON, Neil Future West 5317

ROBERTS, Mark Future West 4964

POTAUAINE, Linda WestWards 4462

KELLY, Cheryl WestWards-Independent 4139

CATHCART, Angus WestWards 3835

DEMPSTER, Dave WestWards 2760

SHEPHERD, Christine Independent 2451

HARTNETT, Tony Independent 2326

WINEERA, Michelle Independent 1506

Blank 729

== 2018 by-election results ==
Ken Turner was the successful candidate in the by-election.

Michelle Clayton – Independent (2,103 votes)
Tiaria Fletcher – Future West (1,625 votes)
Rob Gore – (936 votes)
Ken Turner – WestWards (3,883 votes)
