= William Willetts (sailor) =

- Born: Alexander William Willetts; 15 July 1893; Devonport, Auckland, New Zealand
- Died: 25 October 1957; Epsom, Auckland, New Zealand
- Occupation: Sailor

Alexander William Willetts (15 July 1893 – 25 October 1957) was a notable New Zealand yacht racer. Along with his brother, Albert Willetts, he won numerous yachting trophies in New Zealand during the 1920s and 1930s.

== Biography ==
Willetts was born in Devonport, Auckland, New Zealand on 15 July 1893, one of ten children of Arthur Willetts and his wife Sybil née Beeston. Arthur Willetts worked in the boatbuilding industry as a designer and foreman at a shipyard. William Willetts was educated at local schools and became involved in yachting, along with his brother, Albert.

After the First World War, in which he had served in the New Zealand Expeditionary Force as a gunner, he was particularly successful in Waitere II, a 26-foot H-Class yacht, winning the Auckland Anniversary Regatta from 1925 to 1927 as well as the Auckland to Russell ocean race in 1922, 1925 and 1926. For the latter part of the 1930s, he skippered Tamariki, a 22-foot L-class mullet boat, to victory in 30 races, winning numerous trophies including the Lipton Cup.

Willetts worked in the building industry before becoming a housing inspector in the 1930s. He died in a hospital at Epsom in Auckland on 25 October 1957. He was survived by his wife Gladys née Moore and their children, a son and daughter.
