= French Bay =

Bay near Auckland, New Zealand

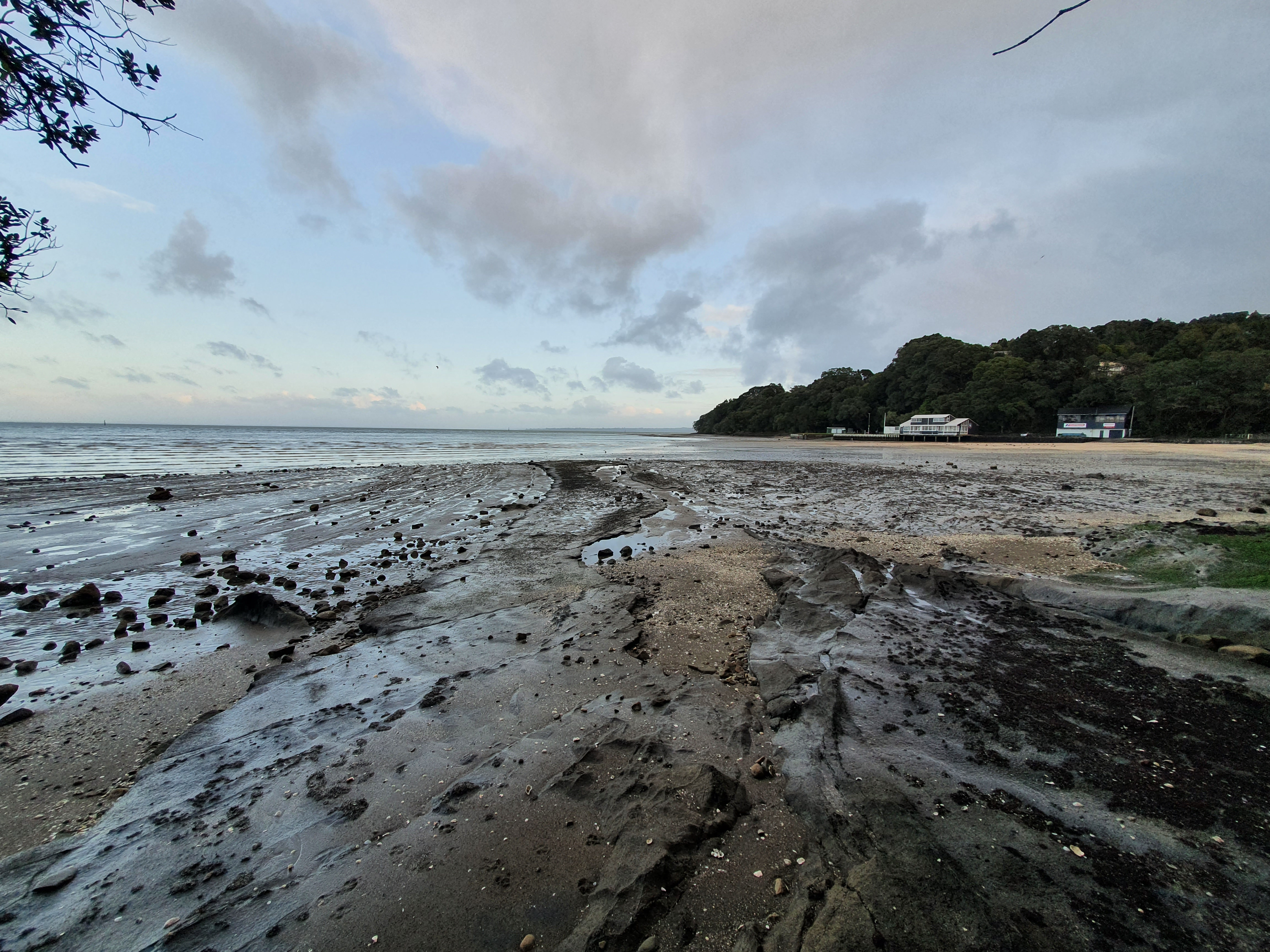
- French Bay at low tide

- Location within the Auckland Region
- Location: Auckland Region, New Zealand
- Coordinates: 36.95°S 174.667°E
- Ocean/sea sources: Manukau Harbour

French Bay, less commonly known as French Bay / Otitori Bay, is a bay in the Auckland Region of New Zealand. It is located in Titirangi on the Manukau Harbour, between Wood Bay to the north and Paturoa Bay to the south.

== History ==
The bay was traditionally called Opou by Tāmaki Māori, literally meaning "the place of posts". The bay became known as French Bay in the 1920s; however, the reason for this is unknown. In the early 20th century, the bay became a popular destination for Aucklanders, undertaking day trips. Painter Colin McCahon lived close to French Bay from 1953 to 1960, and many of his works depict the bay. McCahon's home later became McCahon House, a museum and gallery space.

The beach has variable water quality, and in 2020 was listed as one of the 10 least safe beaches for swimming in the Auckland Region.

== Amenities ==
The French Bay Yacht Club is located on the beach. The yacht club facilities were severely damaged during the 2023 Auckland Anniversary Weekend floods.
