= Little Muddy Creek (New Zealand) =

River in the Auckland Region, New Zealand

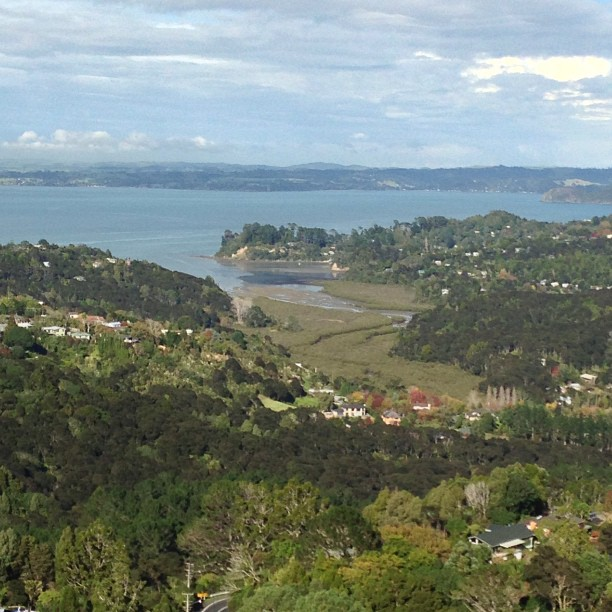
- Little Muddy Creek seen from Titirangi

- Mouth of the Little Muddy Creek Little Muddy Creek (New Zealand) (New Zealand)
- Route of the Little Muddy Creek

Location
- Country: New Zealand
- Region: Auckland Region

Physical characteristics
- Source: Armstrong Gully
  - coordinates: 36.94081°S 174.63998°E
- Mouth: Manukau Harbour
  - coordinates: 36.965°S 174.6466°E

Basin features
- Progression: Little Muddy Creek → Manukau Harbour → Tasman Sea
- Tributaries
  - left: Yorke Gully, Alice Glen
  - right: Waituna Stream, Waiohua Creek

The Little Muddy Creek is a river of the Auckland Region of New Zealand's North Island. It flows south from its source in Titirangi, meets the tributaries Waituna Stream and Waiohua Creek which run through the suburbs of Waima and Woodlands Park, before reaching the Manukau Harbour.

== Geology ==
Between 3 and 5 million years ago, tectonic forces between the Pacific Plate and Australian Plate uplifted the Waitākere Ranges and subsided the Manukau Harbour. Little Muddy Creek is likely a part of a fault-line that formed during this event. After the Last Glacial Maximum when sea levels rose, the river mouths of West Auckland flooded. While beaches formed at the mouths of Tasman Sea rivers, the relative lack of sand in the Manukau Harbour meant that Huia, Big Muddy Creek and Little Muddy Creek became tidal mudflats.

== History ==
The creek was known by Te Kawerau ā Maki and other Tāmaki Māori as Waikūmete, a name that was later applied to the greater Glen Eden area during the time of European settlement. It was a traditionally strategic location, linking the southern Waitākere Ranges to the Manukau Harbour, and a place at the end of a major north-south walking track which was accessible for travel by canoe. The area was known as a place for canoe construction, with many traditional place names referencing the construction of waka made from tōtara wood. The area was protected with a fortified pā at modern-day Laingholm named Te Tokaroa.

In 1825 during the Musket Wars, Te Taoū, Te Uri-o-Hau and other Tāmaki Māori allies re-organised their forces at Waikūmete after the battle of Te Ika a Ranganui on the Kaipara Harbour. Most warriors among the group left for the Waikato after further battles with Ngāpuhi, however a small number of Te Taoū under chief Awarua stayed at Waikūmete temporarily, tending to pig farms. Waka construction continued at Waikūmete after Te Kawerau ā Maki returned to the Tāmaki area after the wars, up until the 1860s.

From the 1830s, kauri trees were felled by European settlers for the logging industry in the southern Waitākere Ranges. A rural community developed in the area in the 1860s. A dock was constructed on Little Muddy Creek, which connected the community to the commercial centre of Onehunga, until road access became the main means of transportation.

== See also ==
- List of rivers of New Zealand
