= Laingholm =

- Suburb
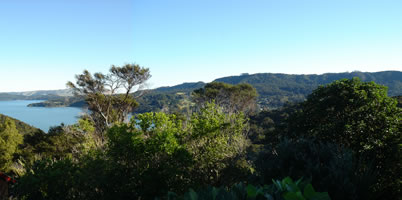
- A view of Laingholm
- Interactive map of Laingholm
- Coordinates: 36.9630°S 174.6273°E
- Country: New Zealand
- City: Auckland
- Local authority: Auckland Council
- Electoral ward: Waitākere ward
- Local board: Waitākere Ranges Local Board

Area
  - Land: 408 ha (1,010 acres)

Population (June 2025)
  - Total: 2,330
  - Density: 571/km^{2} (1,480/sq mi)

	Woodlands Park	Titirangi
Parau	Laingholm
		(Manukau Harbour)

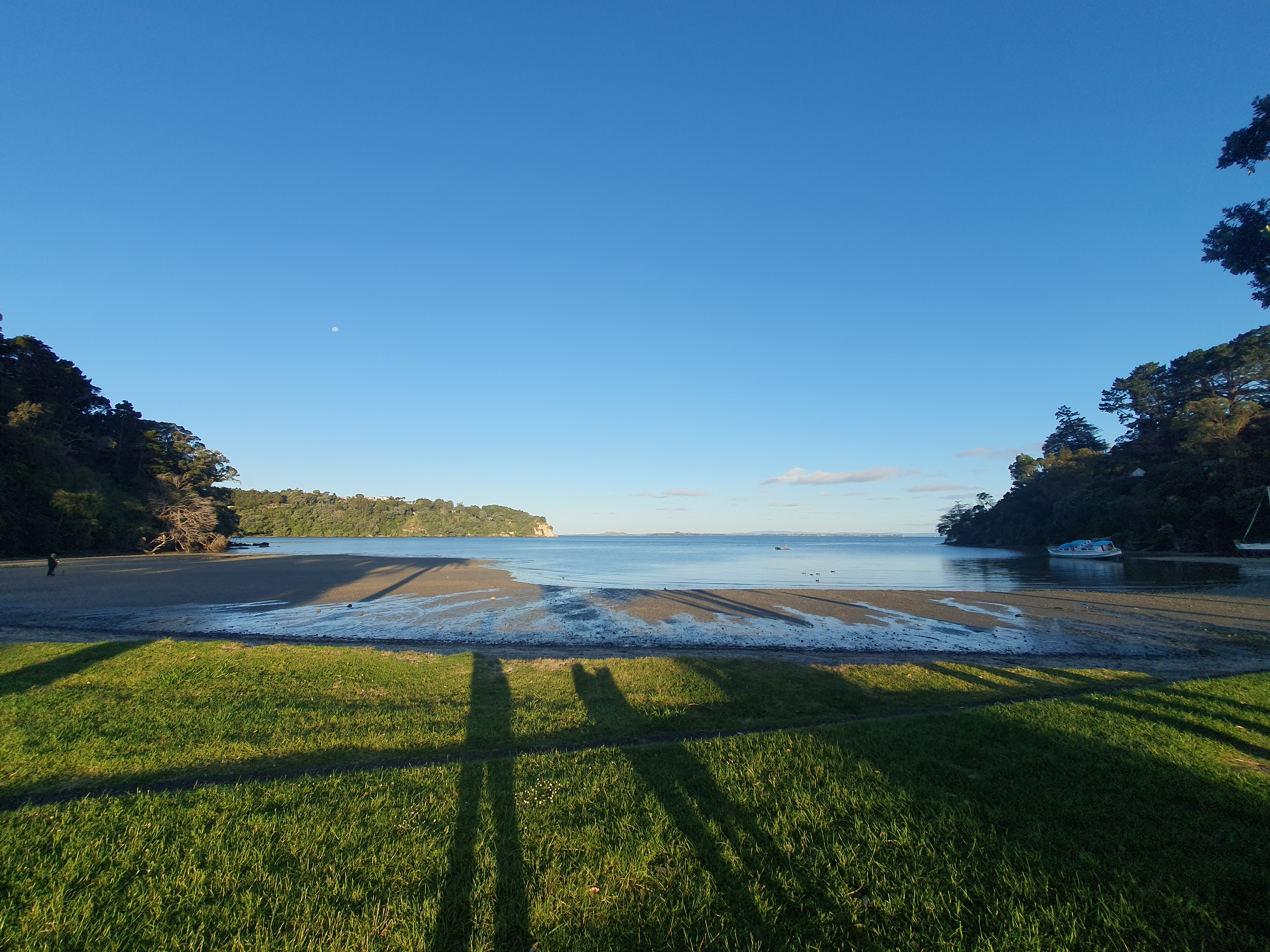
Laingholm Beach

Laingholm is a small community situated in the Waitākere Ranges of West Auckland, New Zealand.

The name is derived from George and John Laing, who farmed the area starting in 1854, before it was subdivided. Celebrations were held in 2003 for the 150th anniversary of European settlement.

Laingholm is located on the shores of the Manukau Harbour and within the Waitākere Ranges.

== Geography ==
Coastal Laingholm is dominated by pōhutukawa/rātā sheltered coastal fringe forest, while inland areas are predominantly a warm lowlands pūriri forest. The West Coast kōwhai grows abundantly on the steep slopes of the Laingholm area.

== History ==
Pioneer farmer George Laing bought 610 acres of land in the mid-19th century, farming the valley and living with his family at the Roseneath farmhouse. The area became known as Laingholm, and the Laing family continued to farm the area until 1921. Laingholm and the greater area developed as farmland in the 1860s, with communities using the dock at Little Muddy Creek as their main access to the outside world, until road access became possible in 1914.

== Demographics ==
Laingholm covers 4.08 km^{2} (1.58 sq mi) and had an estimated population of 2,330 as of June 2025, with a population density of 571 people per km^{2}.

Historical population
Year	Pop.	±% p.a.
2006	2,334	—
2013	2,265	−0.43%
2018	2,385	+1.04%
2023	2,316	−0.59%

Laingholm had a population of 2,316 in the 2023 New Zealand census, a decrease of 69 people (−2.9%) since the 2018 census, and an increase of 51 people (2.3%) since the 2013 census. There were 1,134 males, 1,164 females and 18 people of other genders in 828 dwellings. 3.8% of people identified as LGBTIQ+. The median age was 42.4 years (compared with 38.1 years nationally). There were 465 people (20.1%) aged under 15 years, 327 (14.1%) aged 15 to 29, 1,227 (53.0%) aged 30 to 64, and 297 (12.8%) aged 65 or older.

People could identify as more than one ethnicity. The results were 92.9% European (Pākehā); 9.7% Māori; 3.1% Pasifika; 4.5% Asian; 1.6% Middle Eastern, Latin American and African New Zealanders (MELAA); and 3.1% other, which includes people giving their ethnicity as "New Zealander". English was spoken by 98.1%, Māori language by 1.6%, Samoan by 0.5%, and other languages by 13.3%. No language could be spoken by 1.7% (e.g. too young to talk). New Zealand Sign Language was known by 0.5%. The percentage of people born overseas was 29.4, compared with 28.8% nationally.

Religious affiliations were 19.6% Christian, 0.6% Hindu, 0.3% Māori religious beliefs, 0.9% Buddhist, 0.8% New Age, and 2.1% other religions. People who answered that they had no religion were 68.8%, and 7.0% of people did not answer the census question.

Of those at least 15 years old, 708 (38.2%) people had a bachelor's or higher degree, 876 (47.3%) had a post-high school certificate or diploma, and 270 (14.6%) people exclusively held high school qualifications. The median income was $54,000, compared with $41,500 nationally. 411 people (22.2%) earned over $100,000 compared to 12.1% nationally. The employment status of those at least 15 was that 1,038 (56.1%) people were employed full-time, 291 (15.7%) were part-time, and 39 (2.1%) were unemployed.

== Education ==
Laingholm School is a coeducational contributing primary school (years 1-6) with a roll of 156 as of July 2026. The school was founded in 1950.
