= Titirangi =

- Suburb
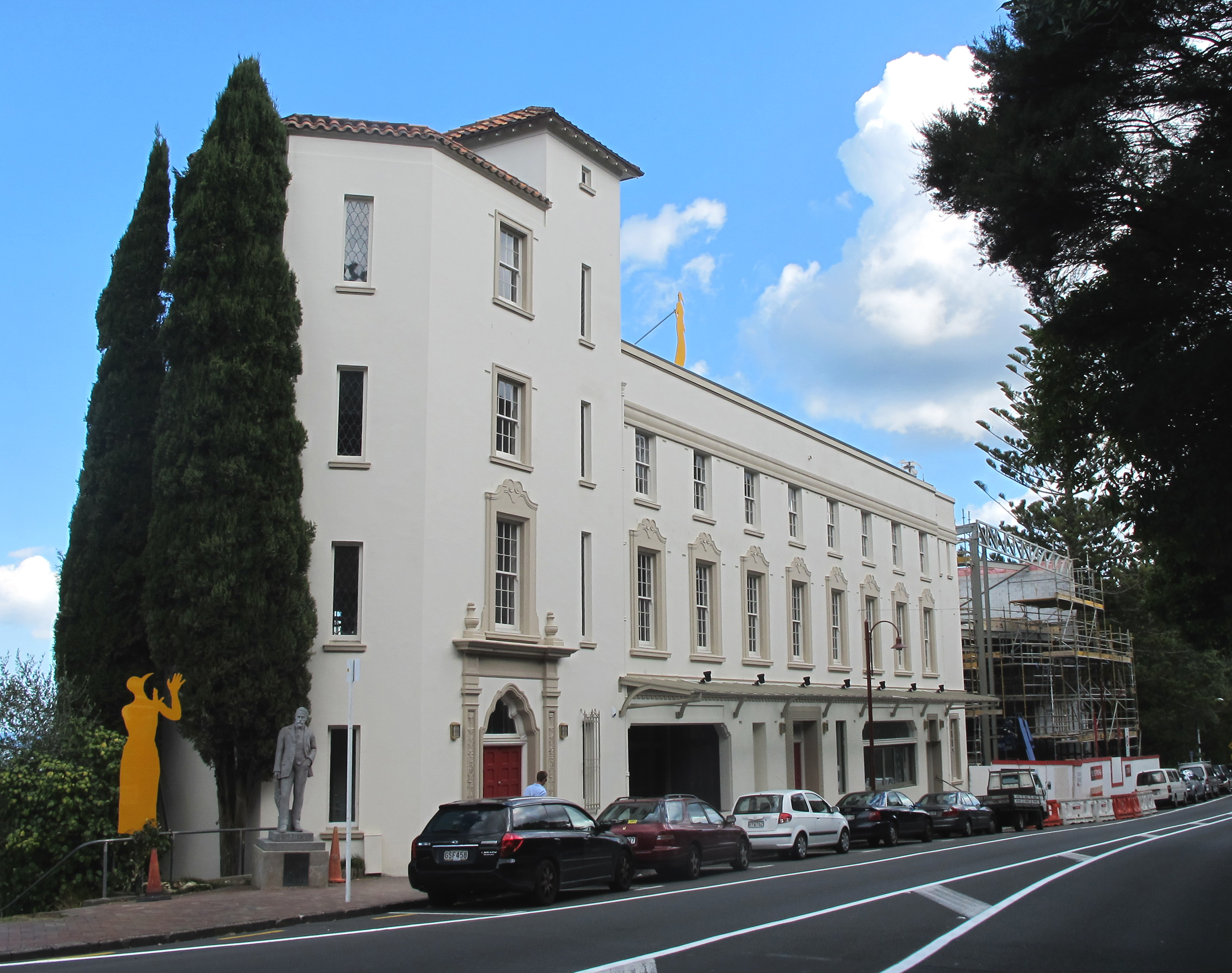
- Lopdell House, formerly the Hotel Titirangi
- Interactive map of Titirangi
- Coordinates: 36°56′16″S 174°39′25″E
- Country: New Zealand
- City: Auckland
- Local authority: Auckland Council
- Electoral ward: Waitākere ward; Whau ward
- Local board: Waitākere Ranges Local Board; Whau Local Board

Area
  - Land: 1,218 ha (3,010 acres)

Population (June 2025)
  - Total: 15,370
  - Density: 1,262/km^{2} (3,268/sq mi)

Konini	Glen Eden	New Lynn
Oratia	Titirangi	Green Bay
Laingholm	(Manukau Harbour)	(Manukau Harbour)

Titirangi is a suburb of West Auckland in the Waitākere Ranges local board area of the city of Auckland in northern New Zealand. It is an affluent, residential suburb located 13 km (8.1 mi) to the southwest of the Auckland city centre, at the southern end of the Waitākere Ranges. In the Māori language "Titirangi" means "hill reaching up to the sky".

== Geography ==
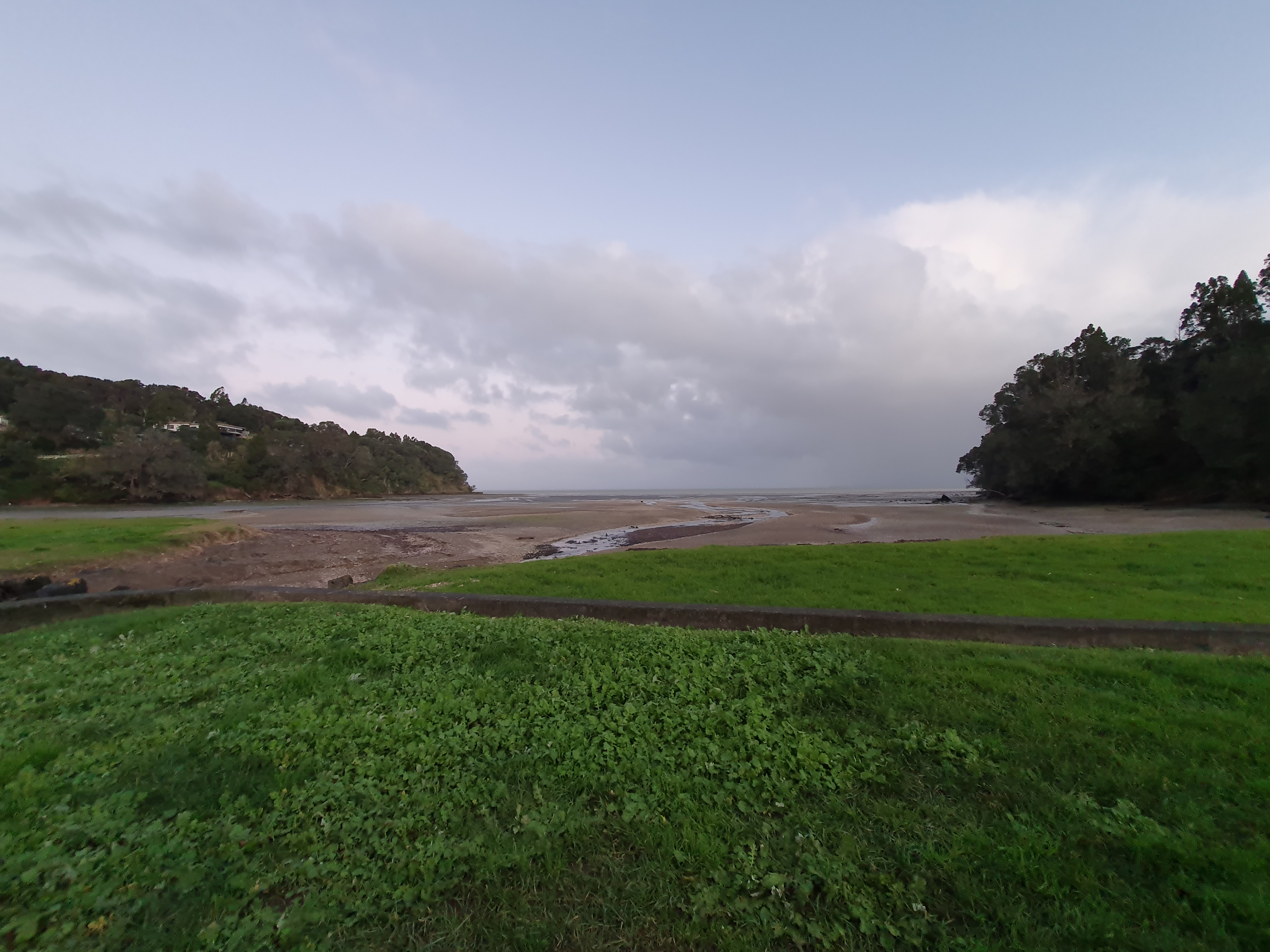
Titirangi Beach in 2022

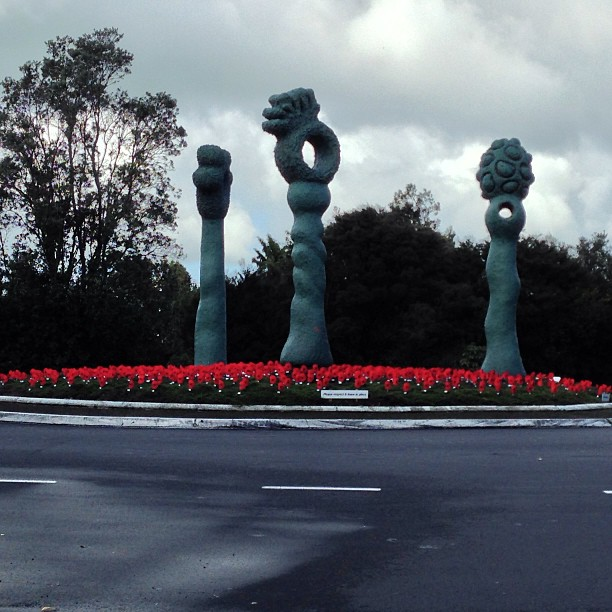
Titirangi roundabout

Titirangi is bordered to the south by Manukau Harbour, to the west and north west by the rest of the Waitākere Ranges' native bush clad hills consisting of the large Centennial Memorial Park and water catchment areas which supply much of Auckland's water. The main road into the Waitākeres, Scenic Drive, begins in Titirangi. To the east and north are a number of more urban suburbs.

The Waitākere Ranges lie on the west coast of the North Island in the path of the prevailing winds from the Tasman and consequently attract a high rainfall. The native bush is home to many native birds, such as the fantail, tūī, kererū or "wood pigeon", morepork, and white-eye as well as geckos and rare native frogs. The landscape of Titirangi ranges from Titirangi Beach on the Manukau Harbour to 400 metres (1,300 ft) high parts of the Waitākere Ranges.

Mt Atkinson is in the foothills of Titirangi, not far from the village centre. In the early 20th century, this was known as Bishop's Hill. There is a short scenic walk, with expansive views of Titirangi Village and the Manukau and Waitemata harbours. There is also 'Zig Zag Track' walk, which winds its way through native bush from the village centre to Titirangi Beach. Exhibition Drive, a well-formed track very popular with walkers, joggers and cyclists, is located 1.5 km (0.93 mi) from the village centre.

== History ==
The area is within the traditional rohe of Te Kawerau ā Maki, an iwi that traces their ancestry to some of the earliest inhabitants of the Auckland Region. According to Maori oral history, the name Tītīrangi was chosen for the area by Rakataura, the senior tohunga of the Tainui migratory canoe. It was used to describe the area between the Motukaraka sandbank of the Manukau Harbour and Little Muddy Creek, and was named in commemoration of a hill in his Pacific homeland, and can be translated as "hill reaching up to the sky". Other translations of the name include "long streaks of cloud in the sky" and "fringe of heaven".

In the mid-19th century, the Manukau Harbour shoreline was primarily used for kauri logging. In December 1855, John Bishop and Thomas Canty acquired 227 acres of land from John Langford, a land dealer who acquired the area from a Crown grant. Most of the kauri forest was harvested for wood by the early settlers.

The first landowner at Titirangi was John Kelly, who bought 103 acres (42 ha) in 1848. Most of Titirangi and the surrounding area was developed as farmland in the 1860s. For communities in the south of Titirangi, most contact to the outside world was through docks along the Manukau Harbour, which linked the settlements to the port of Onehunga. In 1902 at the suggestion of local engineer Henry Atkinson, the wooden precursor to the Upper Nihotupu Dam was constructed, to supply Auckland with a more constant water supply. Atkinson donated land at Titirangi for the project, which involved piping water from the dam to Titirangi, and then on to Auckland City. The dam finished construction in 1923.

Titirangi remained primarily farmland until the advent of World War I, when the number of farm workers in the area plummeted and native plants began to recolonise the area. The Titirangi township greatly developed in the 1910s, because of a need for the laborers working on Scenic Drive (then known as Exhibition Drive) to have lodgings. Exhibition Drive opened on 24 January 1914. In the early 20th century, Wood Bay, French Bay and other Manukau Harbour beaches became popular destinations for Aucklanders.

In 1930, the Hotel Titirangi (now known as Lopdell House) was established as a modern hotel, however the hotel faced difficulties securing a liquor license due to the prohibition of alcohol in West Auckland, and closed less than six months later.

As road access improved in the 1960s, the community became increasingly suburban. Artist Colin McCahon lived at Otitori Bay in Titirangi in the 1950s, during which he painted a number of artworks inspired by the Titirangi landscape. McCahon House is an artists residency. Artists include Tanu Gogo Emily Karaka, Cora-Allan Wickliffe, Judy Millar, Luise Fong, Eve Armstrong, Lisa Reihana and Ava Seymour.

== Governance ==
The Titirangi Road District was formed on 30 April 1870, and was subsequently merged with the Manuaku (Note: The Manuaku Road District is unrelated to Manukau City/County and instead covered the settlements of Whatipu, Huia, and Cornwallis) Road District and abolished 2 years later.

== Historic buildings ==
- Lopdell House
- Titirangi Soldiers' Memorial Church

== Demographics ==
Titirangi covers 12.18 km^{2} (4.70 sq mi) and had an estimated population of 15,370 as of June 2025, with a population density of 1,262 people per km^{2}.

Historical population
Year	Pop.	±% p.a.
2006	11,808	—
2013	14,295	+2.77%
2018	15,171	+1.20%
2023	14,856	−0.42%
The 2006 population is for a smaller area of 10.90 km^{2}. Source:

Titirangi had a population of 14,856 in the 2023 New Zealand census, a decrease of 315 people (−2.1%) since the 2018 census, and an increase of 561 people (3.9%) since the 2013 census. There were 7,353 males, 7,425 females and 78 people of other genders in 5,148 dwellings. 4.3% of people identified as LGBTIQ+. The median age was 41.0 years (compared with 38.1 years nationally). There were 3,024 people (20.4%) aged under 15 years, 2,406 (16.2%) aged 15 to 29, 7,461 (50.2%) aged 30 to 64, and 1,965 (13.2%) aged 65 or older.

People could identify as more than one ethnicity. The results were 82.7% European (Pākehā); 10.4% Māori; 6.2% Pasifika; 13.9% Asian; 1.9% Middle Eastern, Latin American and African New Zealanders (MELAA); and 1.7% other, which includes people giving their ethnicity as "New Zealander". English was spoken by 97.1%, Māori language by 1.7%, Samoan by 0.8%, and other languages by 16.1%. No language could be spoken by 1.7% (e.g. too young to talk). New Zealand Sign Language was known by 0.6%. The percentage of people born overseas was 29.7, compared with 28.8% nationally.

Religious affiliations were 22.8% Christian, 2.6% Hindu, 1.1% Islam, 0.4% Māori religious beliefs, 1.1% Buddhist, 0.6% New Age, 0.2% Jewish, and 1.4% other religions. People who answered that they had no religion were 63.0%, and 6.9% of people did not answer the census question.

Of those at least 15 years old, 4,536 (38.3%) people had a bachelor's or higher degree, 5,475 (46.3%) had a post-high school certificate or diploma, and 1,824 (15.4%) people exclusively held high school qualifications. The median income was $54,000, compared with $41,500 nationally. 2,697 people (22.8%) earned over $100,000 compared to 12.1% nationally. The employment status of those at least 15 was that 6,639 (56.1%) people were employed full-time, 1,785 (15.1%) were part-time, and 303 (2.6%) were unemployed.

Individual statistical areas
Name	Area (km^{2})	Population	Density (per km^{2})	Dwellings	Median age	Median income
Konini Road	1.27	2,079	1,737	744	40.6 years	$55,100
Waima-Woodlands Park	3.48	2,634	757	873	40.1 years	$57,600
Kaurilands	1.46	3,099	2,123	1,071	39.8 years	$53,400
Titirangi East	1.22	3,243	2,658	1,074	39.0 years	$51,100
Titirangi South	4.74	3,798	801	1,389	45.5 years	$54,000
New Zealand					38.1 years	$41,500

== Culture ==
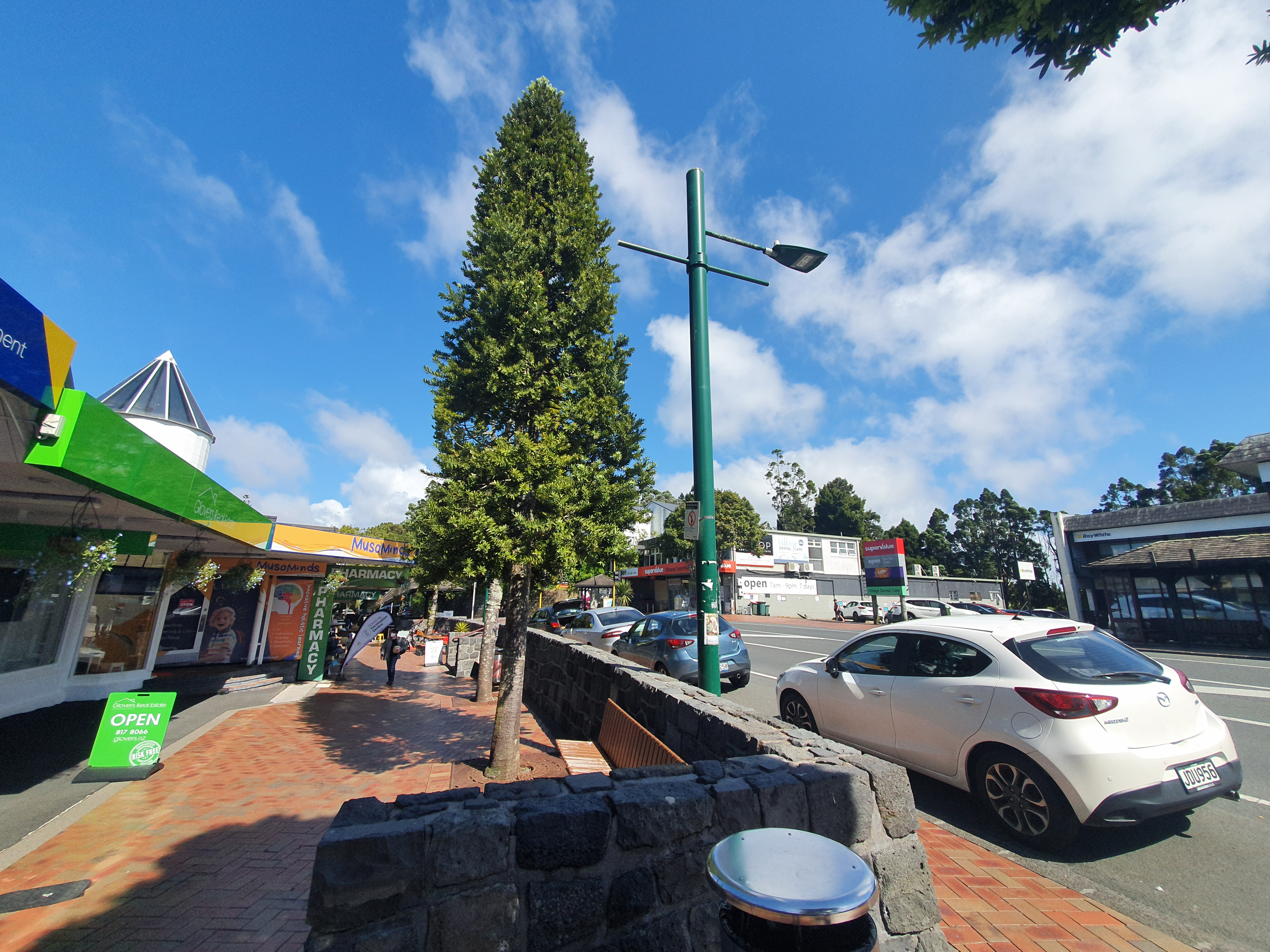
Titirangi village

Titirangi is characterised by houses built within the native bush of the Waitākere Ranges, sometimes with views of the Manukau Harbour. Some of the residential properties are of unusual design. For instance, some houses were raised on poles so that they could be built in the bush without harming the roots of trees surrounding the house.

The name "Titirangi" is often linked with Titirangi Golf Course. The course is actually located on the border of the nearby suburbs of New Lynn and Green Bay. Other areas surrounding Titirangi include Oratia, Nihotupu, Glen Eden, Woodlands Park, Laingholm and Waiatarua.

For a long time the area had a reputation for bohemianism. A number of well known New Zealand musicians, artists, writers and potters currently live or have lived in the area, including singer/songwriter Tim Finn (who wrote the song "I Hope I Never" there), actress Alma Evans-Freake, author Maurice Shadbolt, feminist artist Alexis Hunter, photographers Brian Brake and David Prentice, poet John Caselberg, potter Len Castle and glass artist Ann Robinson. The former house of painter Colin McCahon has been preserved as a museum and residence for artists and writers since 1998.

The sculpture on the round-about connecting Titirangi Road, Atkinson Road, Kohu Road, Scenic Drive and Huia Rd has been a symbol of Titirangi for many years, although it is a controversial presence. Designed by student artist-jeweller Lisa Higgins in 1993, it was originally erected with the intention of only being in place for five years but has remained permanently. This was part of a Waitakere City Council programme of involving artists in public developments. Its original pink colour was toned down to a teal green in 2009.

An active local theatre, cinema, community art gallery and radio station are based in historic Lopdell House. Located next door, Te Uru Waitakere Contemporary Gallery is West Auckland's regional art gallery. Many short walks or tramps in the Waitakeres start from Titirangi.

== Education ==
Titirangi School is a coeducational contributing primary (years 1–6) school with a roll of 446 as of July 2026. The school celebrated its centenary in 1972, although the history of the school dates to around 1845.

The nearest state secondary schools are Green Bay High School, Kelston Boys' High School and Kelston Girls' College.

== Biodiversity ==
The endemic New Zealand moth species Hierodoris huia has only been identified as occurring in Titirangi, and was named after Huia Road.
