= Kaurilands =

- Suburb
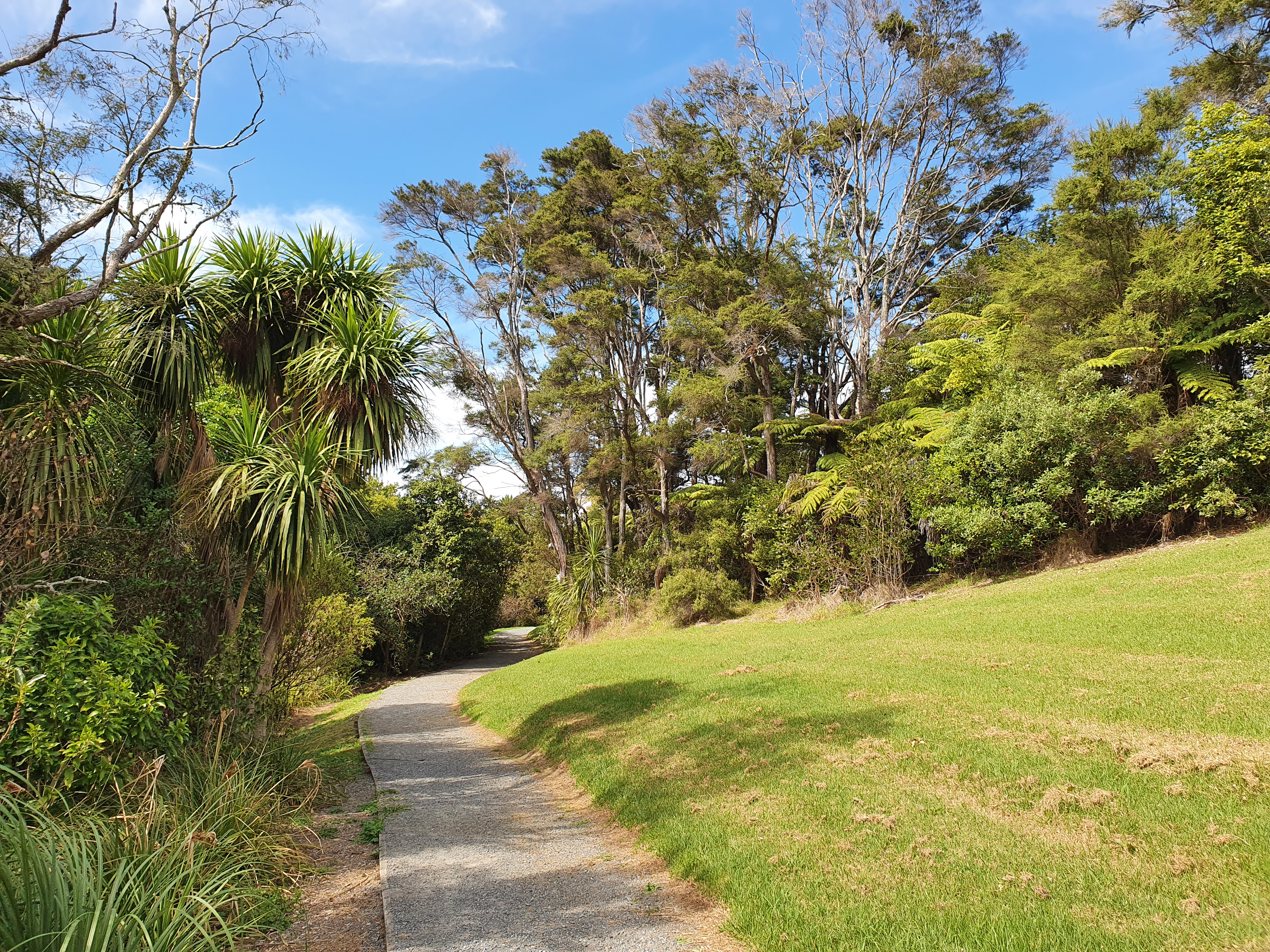
- Kaurilands Domain
- Interactive map of Kaurilands
- Coordinates: 36.9294°S 174.6548°E
- Country: New Zealand
- City: Auckland
- Local authority: Auckland Council
- Electoral ward: Waitākere ward
- Local board: Waitākere Ranges Local Board

Area
  - Land: 146 ha (360 acres)

Population (June 2025)
  - Total: 3,230
  - Density: 2,210/km^{2} (5,730/sq mi)

Oratia	Glen Eden	New Lynn
Konini	Kaurilands	Titirangi
Waima	Titirangi	Titirangi

Kaurilands is a suburb of West Auckland, which is under the local governance of Auckland Council. The area was subdivided and developed in the 1920s.

== Geography ==
Kaurilands is located in the Waitākere Ranges foothills north of Titirangi, in the upper catchment of the Waikumete Stream, which flows north through the suburb. Kaurlands forms a part of the Waitematā-Waitākere foothills ecological zone. Sheltered from the Tasman Sea by the Waitākere Ranges, the area was originally dominated by forests of kauri, Phyllocladus trichomanoides (tānekaha or celery pine) and rimu, with abundant nīkau palm and silver fern. The soils are a mix of Miocene Waitākere volcanic soil and Waitemata Group sedimentary rock.

== History ==
The area is within the traditional rohe of Te Kawerau ā Maki, an iwi that traces their ancestry to some of the earliest inhabitants of the Auckland Region. West Auckland was known as Hikurangi, and the upper catchments of Te Wai-o-Pareira / Henderson Creek were known as Ōkaurirahi, a reference to the mature kauri forests of the area.

During the early colonial days of Auckland, much of modern Konini and Kaurilands was owned by Liverpool immigrant Hibernia Smythe, who aggregated 550 acres of land between 1854 and 1857 north of Titirangi. Smythe used the land for wood and logging, as well as farming sheep and cattle. Smythe had a reputation for being miserly, and after passing left his property to his nephew. In 1925, a company named Kaurilands Limited was formed, to administer the land north of Scenic Drive (then Exhibition Drive) in Titirangi. The Kaurilands Estate was subdivided and sold from 1926 onwards. In the early 20th century, Kaurilands was various described as a part of Titirangi or Waikumete (modern Glen Eden).

During the 1920s and 1930s, the area was the site of a large daffodil farm. Kaurilands School was opened in 1954, and the area's first post office was built on Withers Road in 1964.

== Demographics ==
Kaurilands covers 1.46 km^{2} (0.56 sq mi) and had an estimated population of 3,230 as of June 2025, with a population density of 2,212 people per km^{2}.

Historical population
Year	Pop.	±% p.a.
2006	2,970	—
2013	3,051	+0.39%
2018	3,177	+0.81%
2023	3,099	−0.50%

Kaurilands had a population of 3,099 in the 2023 New Zealand census, a decrease of 78 people (−2.5%) since the 2018 census, and an increase of 48 people (1.6%) since the 2013 census. There were 1,539 males, 1,554 females and 12 people of other genders in 1,071 dwellings. 3.8% of people identified as LGBTIQ+. The median age was 39.8 years (compared with 38.1 years nationally). There were 648 people (20.9%) aged under 15 years, 540 (17.4%) aged 15 to 29, 1,527 (49.3%) aged 30 to 64, and 381 (12.3%) aged 65 or older.

People could identify as more than one ethnicity. The results were 80.2% European (Pākehā); 12.2% Māori; 5.2% Pasifika; 15.2% Asian; 2.6% Middle Eastern, Latin American and African New Zealanders (MELAA); and 2.3% other, which includes people giving their ethnicity as "New Zealander". English was spoken by 96.9%, Māori language by 1.5%, Samoan by 0.8%, and other languages by 16.8%. No language could be spoken by 1.9% (e.g. too young to talk). New Zealand Sign Language was known by 0.5%. The percentage of people born overseas was 28.8, compared with 28.8% nationally.

Religious affiliations were 21.2% Christian, 3.8% Hindu, 1.4% Islam, 0.4% Māori religious beliefs, 1.2% Buddhist, 0.7% New Age, 0.2% Jewish, and 1.5% other religions. People who answered that they had no religion were 63.4%, and 6.4% of people did not answer the census question.

Of those at least 15 years old, 888 (36.2%) people had a bachelor's or higher degree, 1,140 (46.5%) had a post-high school certificate or diploma, and 423 (17.3%) people exclusively held high school qualifications. The median income was $53,400, compared with $41,500 nationally. 531 people (21.7%) earned over $100,000 compared to 12.1% nationally. The employment status of those at least 15 was that 1,365 (55.7%) people were employed full-time, 357 (14.6%) were part-time, and 69 (2.8%) were unemployed.

== Education ==
Glen Eden Intermediate School is a school for years 7–8 with a roll of 966 students.

Kaurilands School is a contributing primary school (years 1–6), with a roll of 718 students. The school was founded in 1955.

Both schools are coeducational. Rolls are as of July 2025.
