= Sunnyvale, New Zealand =

Sunnyvale is the name of two places in New Zealand:

- Sunnyvale, Auckland, a suburb of Auckland
- Sunnyvale, Otago, a suburb of Dunedin
