= Glen Eden =

Suburb of Auckland, New Zealand

- Suburb
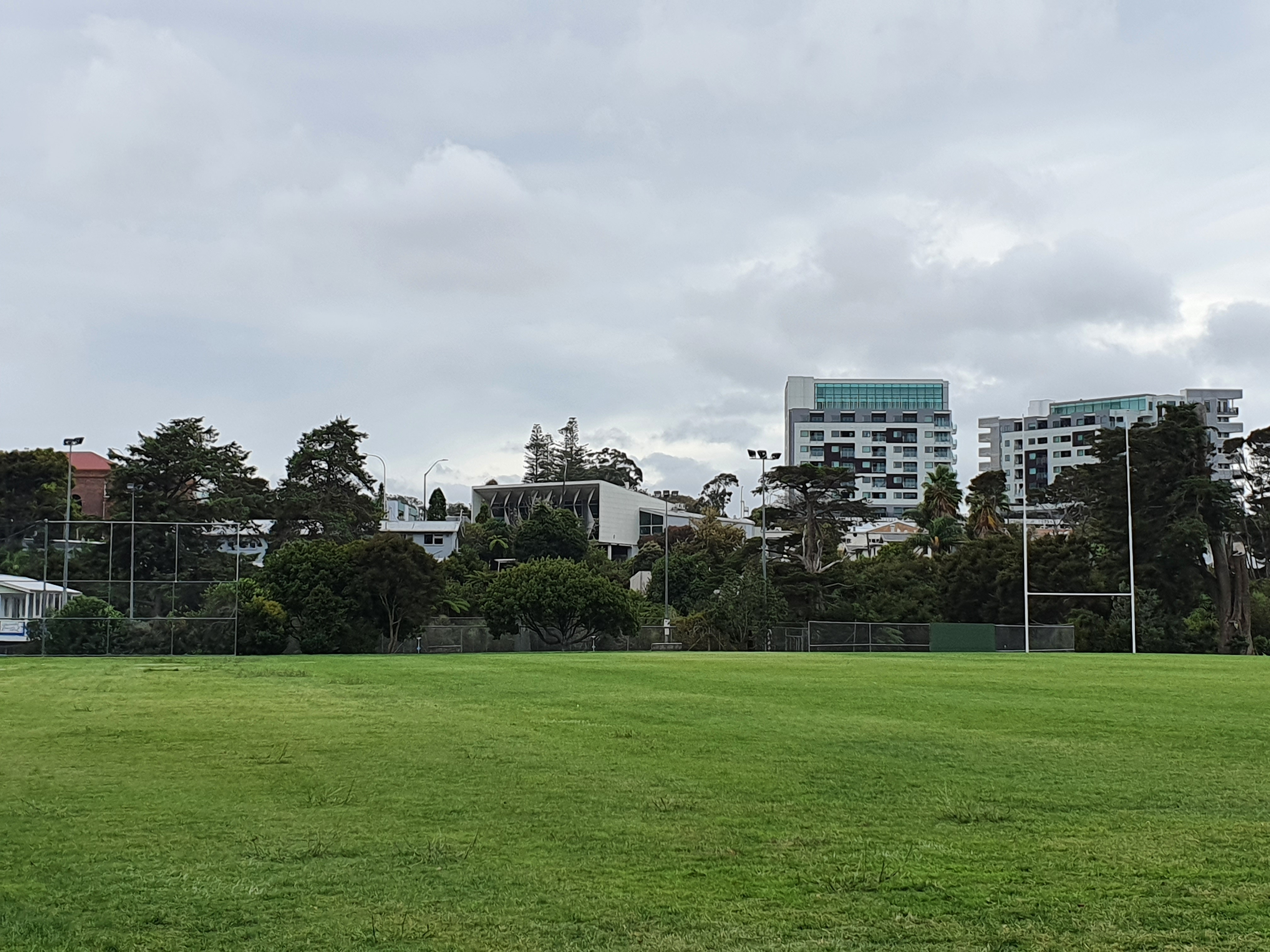
- Glen Eden town centre, Playhouse Theatre and Glen Eden library seen from Harold Moody Park
- Interactive map of Glen Eden
- Coordinates: 36°55′S 174°39′E
- Country: New Zealand
- City: Auckland
- Local authority: Auckland Council
- Electoral ward: Waitākere ward
- Local board: Waitākere Ranges Local Board

Area
  - Land: 753 ha (1,860 acres)

Population (June 2025)
  - Total: 21,230
  - Density: 2,820/km^{2} (7,300/sq mi)
- Train stations: Glen Eden railway station

Sunnyvale	Glendene	Kelston
Oratia	Glen Eden	New Lynn
Konini	Kaurilands	Titirangi

Glen Eden is a suburb of West Auckland, New Zealand, located at the foothills of the Waitākere Ranges. Originally known as Waikumete, the suburb gained the name Glen Eden in 1921. The suburb is in the Waitākere Ward, one of the thirteen administrative areas of Auckland governed by Auckland Council.

Part of the rohe of Te Kawerau ā Maki, the area was developed into orchards during the Colonial era of New Zealand. The Glen Eden railway station opened in 1880, linking the area to central Auckland along the Western Line, and leading to the development of the Waikumete Cemetery. Suburban housing was built in the area in the 1950s and 1960s.

== Geography ==
The Glen Eden area is located at the foothills of Waitākere Ranges, north of Titirangi. The Waikumete Stream flows north from Titirangi, forming a valley in the centre of the suburb.

Glen Eden forms a part of the Waitematā-Waitākere foothills ecological zone. Sheltered from the Tasman Sea by the Waitākere Ranges, the area was originally dominated by forests of kauri, Phyllocladus trichomanoides (tānekaha or celery pine) and rimu, with abundant nīkau palm and silver fern. The soils are a mix of Miocene Waitākere volcanic soil and Waitemata Group sedimentary rock.

== History ==
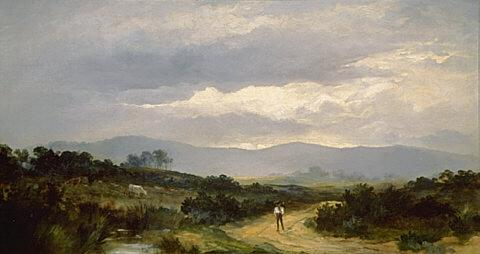
The Ranges at Waikumete, an 1889 oil painting by Thomas Drummond showing a rural landscape of Glen Eden

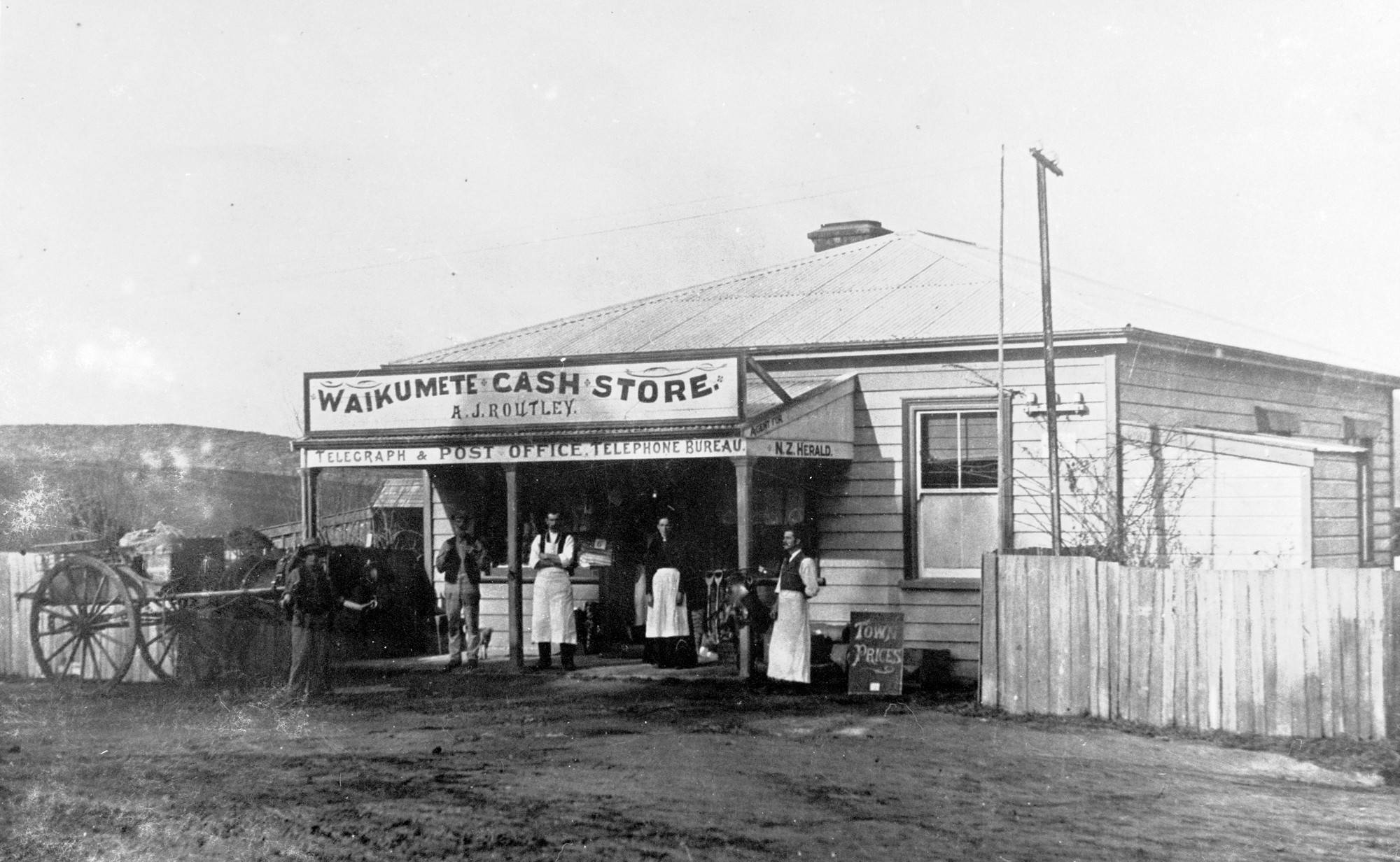
The Waikumete Cash Store, a general store in Glen Eden (formerly Waikumete) in 1905

The area is within the traditional rohe of Te Kawerau ā Maki, an iwi that traces their ancestry to some of the earliest inhabitants of the Auckland Region. West Auckland was known as Hikurangi, and the area of the upper catchments of Te Wai-o-Pareira / Henderson Creek was known as Ōkaurirahi, a reference to the mature kauri forests of the area. The northern Glen Eden and Kelston area was called Onewherowhero, a reference to the red coloured clay found in the area. Te Kawerau ā Maki had a kāinga near modern Holdens Road in Oratia, close to Glen Eden. In 1825, most members of Te Kawerau ā Maki fled the area for refuge in the Waikato during the Musket Wars, with a small number remaining in the area to maintain ahi kā (fires of continuous occupation). After the Musket Wars, Te Kawerau ā Maki returned to the area in the 1830s. Most members chose to settle close to a defensive pā at Te Henga / Bethells Beach.

After the 1840 signing of the Treaty of Waitangi, paramount chief Apihai Te Kawau of the iwi now known as Ngāti Whātua Ōrākei made a tuku (strategic gift) of land at Waihorotiu on the Waitematā Harbour, which developed into the modern city of Auckland. By this time, modern Glen Eden was known as Waikomiti or Waikumete, literally meaning "Water of the Wooden Bowl", referring to a type of snare used to catch kererū. Waikūmete is a traditional Te Kawerau ā Maki name for Little Muddy Creek in south Titirangi on the Manukau Harbour, that was applied to the greater area during the time of European settlement. By the 1880s, the spelling Waikomiti was regularly described as a misspelling of Waikumete, and in 1898 the post office was officially renamed.

Early settlers such as John Bishop and Thomas Canty felled bush in the Oratia and Glen Eden areas from the mid-1840s. Kauri logging of the Waitākere Ranges foothills was an early industry which drew people to the area. Glen Eden was a part of the Titirangi Block sold to the crown in 1848. Permanent European settlers first arrived in the Glen Eden area in 1853, clearing the land to be used as orchards. The orchards began to prosper in the early 1900s, when immigrants from Dalmatia (modern-day Croatia) settled in the area. The clay soils made travelling in the area difficult, but were conductive for brickmaking, such as at Ceramco Park.

The Western Line opened in March 1880, connecting Waikumete to Auckland by rail and encouraging growth in the area. The train station acted as a hub for the community, with most businesses opening close to the station. In 1886, the Waikumete Cemetery was established, due to the proximity of the area to the Western Line. Many people viewed the cemetery as having a negative effect on the area, making it a less desirable place to live.

In 1901, the first town hall was built in the area, and in 1910 the first Methodist Church was constructed in Waikumete. Social life of the area revolved around the town hall, which showed movies, held dances and political meetings. During World War I, the hall was used to train territorials for the army.

The Waikumete Cemetery became the burial place for many of the people who died during the 1918 influenza pandemic. While local residents were mostly unscathed, people who died in Auckland were transported en masse to Waikumete Cemetery.

On 1 November 1921, Waikumete was renamed Glen Eden, when the area was formed into a town district. One of the reasons why the name changed was that the name Waikumete had become closely associated with the cemetery. The new name referenced the central Auckland suburb of Mount Eden, as well as the many valleys (glens) in the suburb. After the area was formed into a town district, the area boomed as a working class neighbourhood. The Great Depression greatly affected Glen Eden, leaving many new houses vacant as potential occupants could not afford to buy or rent them.

In 1935, the Glen Eden town hall burnt down, and was rebuilt within the next two years. The town hall remained a community social hub, holding events, movie showings and theatre productions. The building is currently known as the Glen Eden Playhouse Theatre. Between 1945 and 1954, the Waitemata Obstetric Hospital run by Vera Ellis-Crowther operated from her land on Glengarry Road.

The area developed from a rural community in the 1940s into a satellite suburb of Auckland in the 1950s. In 1953 the population of the area had increased enough that the town district became the Glen Eden Borough. The borough status of Glen Eden brought prosperity, and allowed the local council to borrow funds to develop the area. Between 1951 and 1961, the population of Glen Eden tripled. In 1970, Glenmall, a local shopping precinct, was opened to the south of the train station. The population grew to over 10,000 residents in the mid-1980s.

Many streets in Glen Eden are named after early residents, or after Antarctic explorers from the Terra Nova Expedition (1910–1913). Most housing is wooden, with a few old farmhouses, some 1930s art deco houses, and post-war bungalows and weatherboard houses. There is also more recent terrace housing.

== Demographics ==
Glen Eden covers 7.53 km^{2} (2.91 sq mi) and had an estimated population of 21,230 as of June 2025, with a population density of 2,819 inhabitants per square kilometre (7,300/sq mi).

Historical population
Year	Pop.	±% p.a.
2006	15,396	—
2013	17,853	+2.14%
2018	19,008	+1.26%
2023	19,593	+0.61%
The 2006 population is for a smaller area of 5.67 km^{2}. Source:

Glen Eden had a population of 19,593 in the 2023 New Zealand census, an increase of 585 people (3.1%) since the 2018 census, and an increase of 1,740 people (9.7%) since the 2013 census. There were 9,660 males, 9,849 females and 84 people of other genders in 6,582 dwellings. 3.6% of people identified as LGBTIQ+. The median age was 34.6 years (compared with 38.1 years nationally). There were 4,308 people (22.0%) aged under 15 years, 3,885 (19.8%) aged 15 to 29, 9,387 (47.9%) aged 30 to 64, and 2,016 (10.3%) aged 65 or older.

People could identify as more than one ethnicity. The results were 53.3% European (Pākehā); 15.6% Māori; 21.6% Pasifika; 25.1% Asian; 3.2% Middle Eastern, Latin American and African New Zealanders (MELAA); and 1.7% other, which includes people giving their ethnicity as "New Zealander". English was spoken by 93.6%, Māori language by 3.0%, Samoan by 5.7%, and other languages by 23.2%. No language could be spoken by 2.9% (e.g. too young to talk). New Zealand Sign Language was known by 0.7%. The percentage of people born overseas was 35.5, compared with 28.8% nationally.

Religious affiliations were 33.2% Christian, 6.7% Hindu, 3.4% Islam, 1.0% Māori religious beliefs, 1.6% Buddhist, 0.5% New Age, 0.1% Jewish, and 1.8% other religions. People who answered that they had no religion were 44.8%, and 7.0% of people did not answer the census question.

Of those at least 15 years old, 4,194 (27.4%) people had a bachelor's or higher degree, 7,170 (46.9%) had a post-high school certificate or diploma, and 3,921 (25.7%) people exclusively held high school qualifications. The median income was $44,600, compared with $41,500 nationally. 1,689 people (11.1%) earned over $100,000 compared to 12.1% nationally. The employment status of those at least 15 was that 8,457 (55.3%) people were employed full-time, 1,746 (11.4%) were part-time, and 582 (3.8%) were unemployed.

Individual statistical areas
Name	Area (km^{2})	Population	Density (per km^{2})	Dwellings	Median age	Median income
Glen Eden West	1.15	3,774	3,282	1,152	33.6 years	$41,000
Glen Eden Rosier	1.24	3,456	2,787	1,104	34.7 years	$44,100
Glen Eden North	1.88	2,673	1,422	969	33.7 years	$41,900
Glen Eden Woodglen	0.92	3,231	3,512	1,092	34.0 years	$47,100
Glen Eden Central	1.25	3,612	2,890	1,329	35.7 years	$44,200
Glen Eden Konini	1.09	2,847	2,612	939	35.9 years	$50,800
New Zealand					38.1 years	$41,500

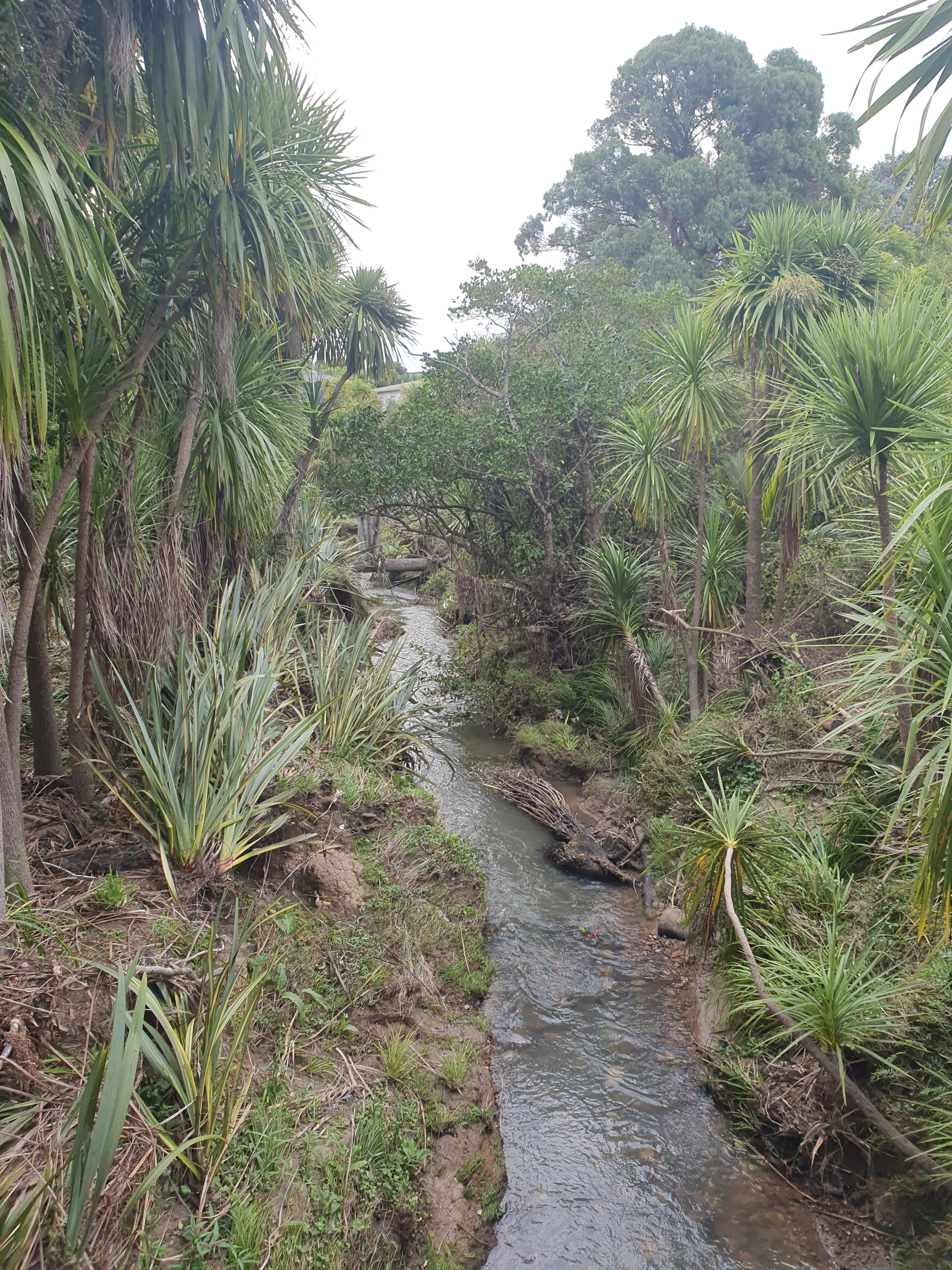
The Waikumete stream

== Landmarks and features ==
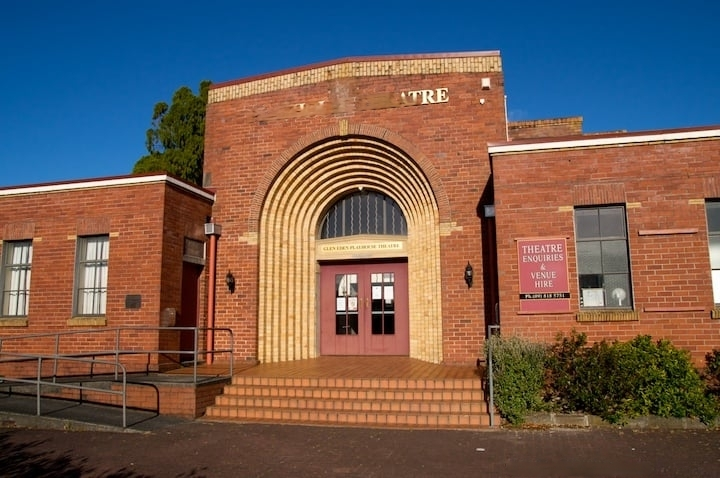
The Glen Eden Playhouse Theatre

- Ceramco Park. The site of a former clay quarry and landfill, the park features the Ceramco Park Function Centre and Glen Eden Athletics and Harrier Club.
- Glen Eden Library, built in 2004.
- Glen Eden Playhouse Theatre. A theatre originally built as a town hall and cinema.
- Glen Eden railway station
- Glenmall, also known as the Glen Eden Village. The commercial centre of the suburb, situated on West Coast Road.
- Hoani Waititi Marae. Established as a pan-tribal marae for Urban Māori.
- Parrs Park. A large recreational park in the western Glen Eden/Oratia area.
- Waikumete Cemetery. The cemetery is the second largest cemetery in the Southern Hemisphere, and includes 43.9 hectares of protected urban forest and streams, including the largest remaining gumland forest of the Tāmaki Ecological District.
- Waikumete Stream. A stream that forms part of the catchment for Te Wai-o-Pareira / Henderson Creek. The stream begins in Titirangi, flows north then north-west through Glen Eden, and meets the Oratia Stream at Sunnyvale. The stream forms a part of Te Ara Hono, an Auckland Council path linking Glen Eden to Kaurilands, and runs adjacent to the Kaurilands Domain, Ceramco Park, Upper Waikumete Stream Walk and Cycleway, Harold Moody Reserve, Ceramco Park and Duck Park.

== Politics ==
Glen Eden is separated between the Kelston and New Lynn general electorates, and entirely within the Tāmaki Makaurau Māori parliamentary electorate. Carmel Sepuloni has been the Member of Parliament for Kelston since 2014, and has her electorate office located in Glen Eden. Paulo Garcia has been the Member of Parliament for New Lynn since 2023, while Takutai Tarsh Kemp has been the Member of Parliament for Tāmaki Makaurau since 2023.

=== Local government ===
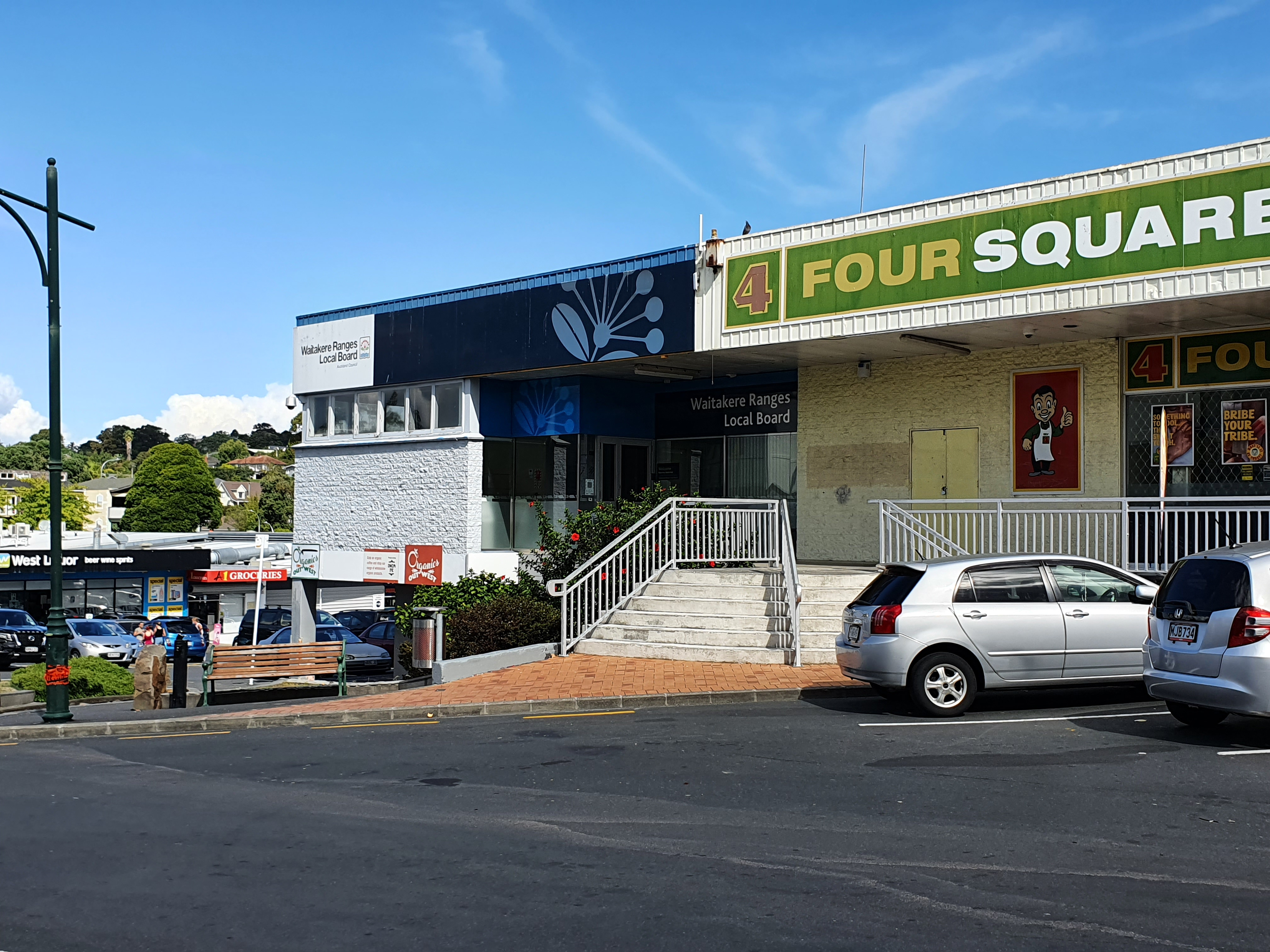
The Waitākere Ranges Local Board office in Glen Eden village

The first authority to administered the area was the Waikomiti Road District, established 26 September 1867, it began operation in 1870 and was dissolved in 1886. From the 1840s, the rural area that would become Glen Eden was known as the Parish of Waikomiti in the County of Eden. By the early 20th century, the area was administered as a part of the Waitemata County, a vast area which administered much of West and Northern Auckland. The area was a part of the Waikumete Riding, a section of the county which covered Glen Eden (then Waikumete), Titirangi and Waiatarua.

After World War II, a movement within the community began to separate the township of Waikumete from the surrounding Waitemata County, due to the perception that local government needed to increase rates to improve the area's roading. In 1921 this was achieved, and the Glen Eden Town Council was formed. The town board was composed of between 7 and 8 commissioners, of whom five served as chairman between 1922 and 1941: J Trefaskis, W H Shepherd, W E Martin, A J Routley and J H Harding. The town board's early days were known for much in-fighting between commissioners.

In 1953, the town became the Glen Eden Borough, which allowed the council more autonomy, and granted them the ability to borrow money for local developments.

In 1989, the boroughs of Glen Eden, Henderson and New Lynn and Waitemata City (the former Waitemata County) merged to form the Waitakere City. New Lynn and Glen Eden were administered together as parts of the New Lynn Ward. On 1 November 2010, the Auckland Council was formed as a unitary authority governing the entire Auckland Region, with Glen Eden becoming a part of the Waitākere Ranges local board area, administered by the Waitākere Ranges Local Board.

Glen Eden is represented on the Auckland Council by Waitākere ward councillors Ken Turner and Shane Henderson.

==== Mayors of Glen Eden ====
During its existence from 1953 to 1989, the borough of Glen Eden had five mayors. The following is a complete list:

	Name	Portrait	Term of office
1	Geoff Hallam		1953–1956
2	John F. Porter		1956–1965
3	Harold Moody		1965–1971
4	Brian K. Berg		1971–1983
5	Janet Clews		1983–1989

== Education ==
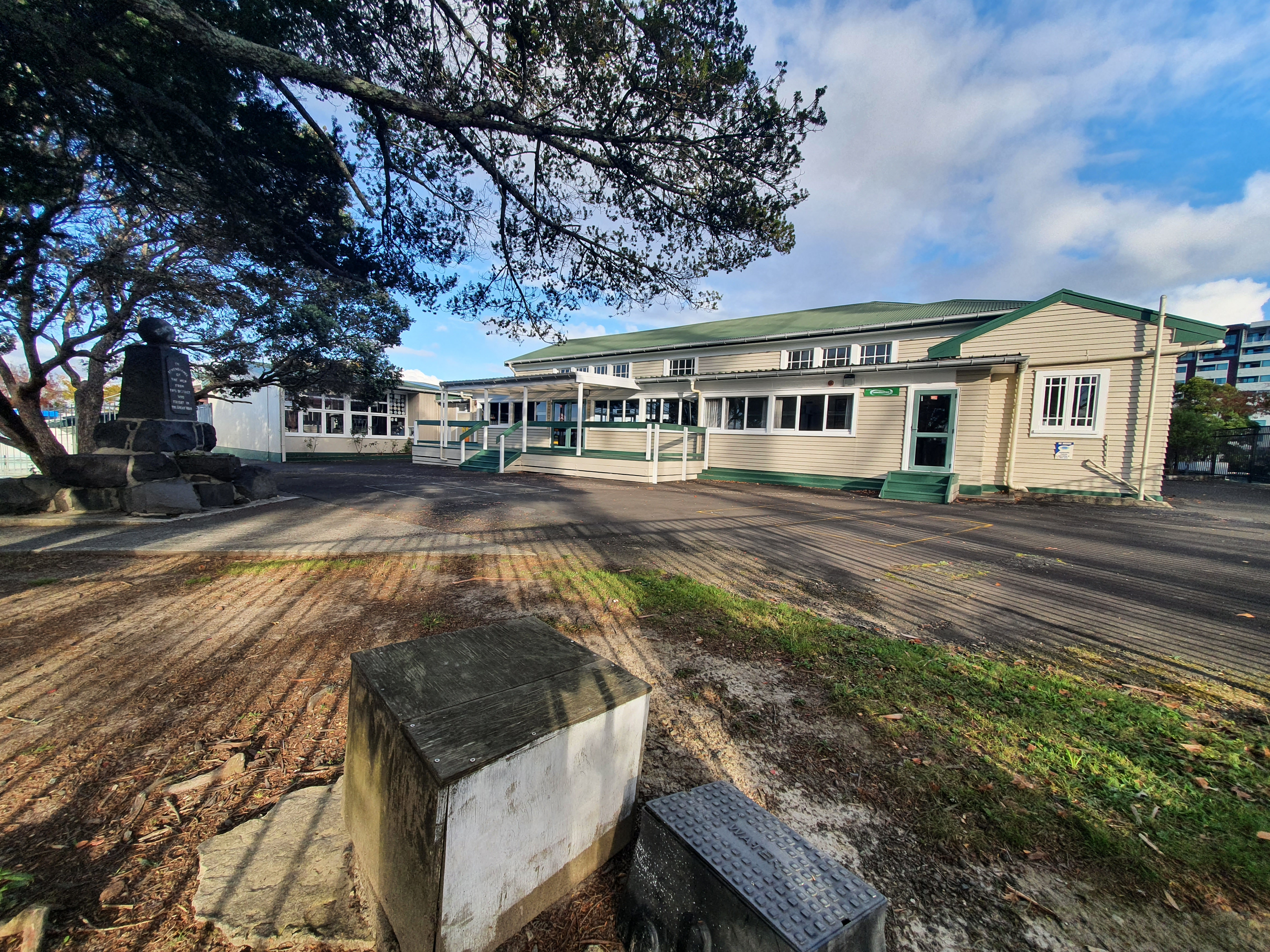
Glen Eden Primary School was the first school established in the area

In the early 20th century, school children travelled to local primary schools in New Lynn and Henderson. In 1915, the first school that opened in the area, the Glen Eden Primary School. Originally known as Waikumete School, the school changed its name to Glen Eden School in 1921, when the suburb was renamed. The first school building was previously used for the school at New Lynn (the current location of Kelston Girls' College), which was transported to Glen Eden after a new school building was built for the New Lynn school. Today, Glen Eden Primary School is a contributing primary (years 1–6) school with a roll of 312 students. Prospect School opened in 1958, and is a contributing primary (years 1–6) school with a roll of 324. Another contributing school in the area is Konini School which opened in 1976. Te Kura Kaupapa Māori o Hoani Waititi, a composite Māori-language immersion school (years 1–13) with a roll of 239. All these schools are coeducational. Rolls are as at July 2026.

Glen Eden Intermediate School was built in 1960. It is a school for years 7–8 with a roll of 924 students, and located to the south of Glen Eden, in the modern suburb of Kaurilands. Local secondary schools nearby are Kelston Boys' High School and Kelston Girls' College, which opened as a co-educational high school in 1954 before separating in 1963.

== Sport and recreation ==
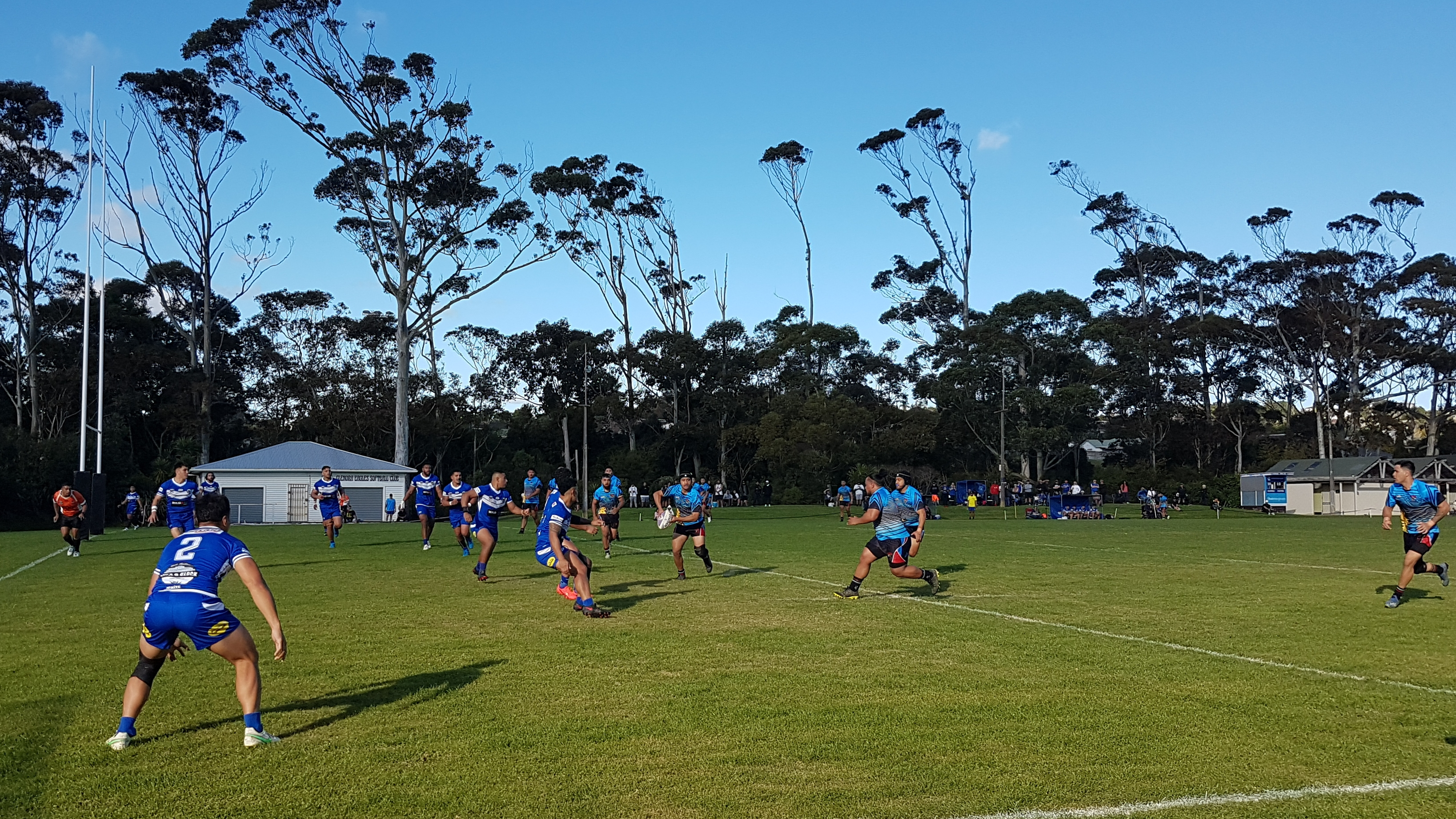
The Glenora Bears facing the Pakuranga Jaguars at Harold Moody Park

The Glenora Rugby League team plays at Glenora Park.

Glen Eden has one of the oldest Scouts clubs in the country, which has running since 1925.

== Transportation ==
Glen Eden is accessible by West Coast Road, an arterial road that separates from Great North Road at Kelston and heads towards Waiatarua, a settlement in the Waitākere Ranges. Glen Eden is serviced by the Glen Eden railway station, located on the East West Line of Auckland's suburban rail network.

== Bibliography ==
- Stone, R. C. J. (2001). From Tamaki-makau-rau to Auckland. Auckland University Press. ISBN 1869402596.
- Vela, Pauline, ed. (1989). In Those Days: An Oral History of Glen Eden. Glen Eden Borough Council. ISBN 0-473-00862-9.
