= Konini =

- Suburb
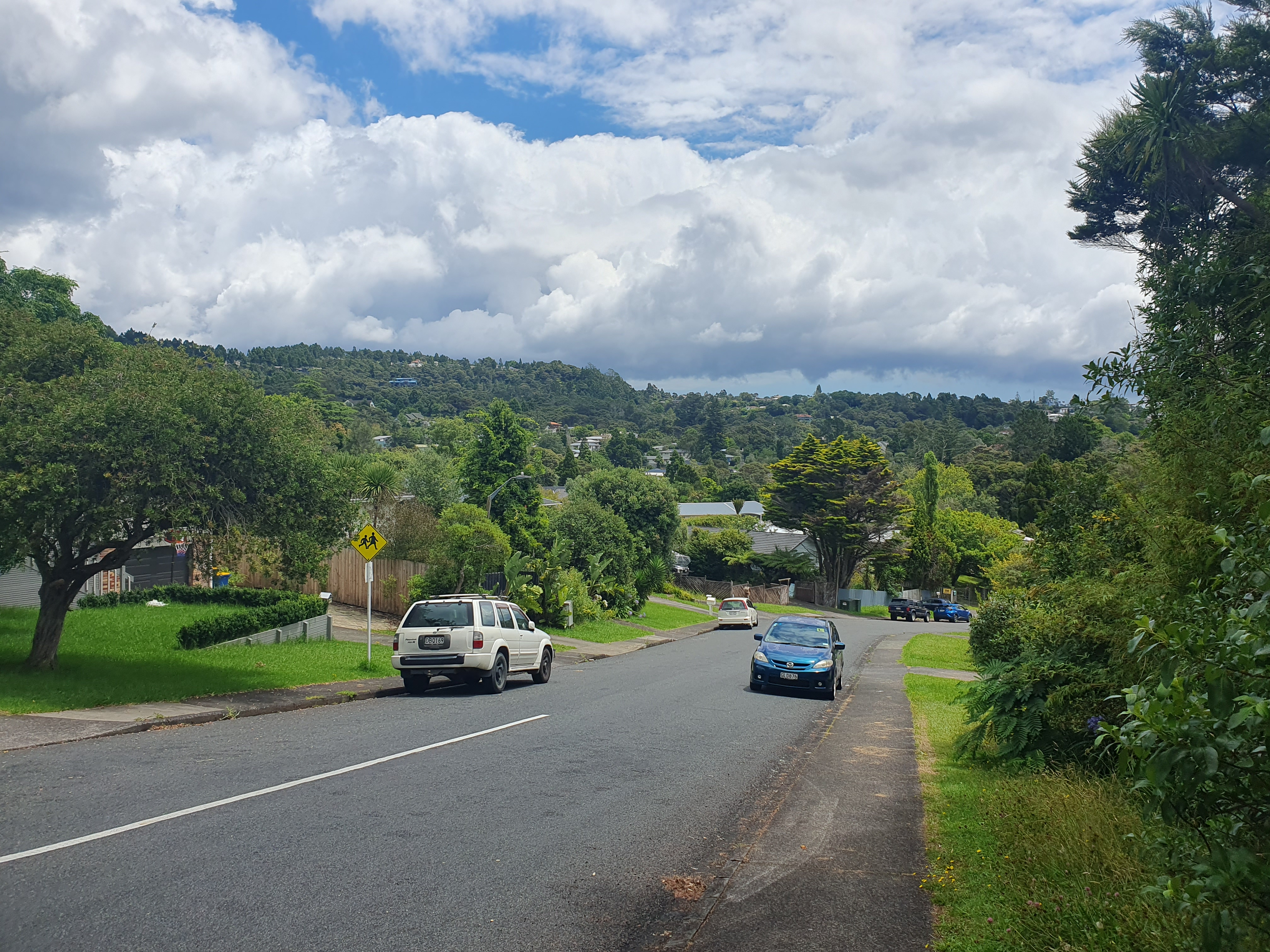
- Interactive map of Konini
- Coordinates: 36.927°S 174.645°E
- Country: New Zealand
- City: Auckland
- Local authority: Auckland Council
- Electoral ward: Waitākere ward
- Local board: Waitākere Ranges Local Board

Area
  - Land: 236 ha (580 acres)

Population (June 2025)
  - Total: 5,150
  - Density: 2,180/km^{2} (5,650/sq mi)

Oratia	Glen Eden	Glen Eden
Waiatarua	Konini	Kaurilands
Waima	Titirangi	Titirangi

Konini is a suburb in West Auckland, New Zealand, under the local governance of Auckland Council. (Kōnini is the Māori-language name for the fruit of the tree fuchsia.)

== Geography ==
Konini is enclosed in lush bush at the western ends and tranquil suburban streets to the east. Konini Road is a long bending street that moves from the suburb of Glen Eden to the Waitākere Ranges and native rain forest. Konini forms a part of the Waitematā-Waitākere foothills ecological zone. Sheltered from the Tasman Sea by the Waitākere Ranges, the area was originally dominated by forests of kauri, Phyllocladus trichomanoides (tānekaha or celery pine) and rimu, with abundant nīkau palm and silver fern. The soils are a mix of Miocene Waitākere volcanic soil and Waitemata Group sedimentary rock.

== History ==
The area is within the traditional rohe of Te Kawerau ā Maki, an iwi that traces their ancestry to some of the earliest inhabitants of the Auckland Region. West Auckland was known as Hikurangi, and the upper catchments of Te Wai-o-Pareira / Henderson Creek were known as Ōkaurirahi, a reference to the mature kauri forests of the area.

During the early colonial days of Auckland, much of Konini and Kaurilands was owned by Liverpool immigrant Hibernia Smythe, who aggregated 550 acres of land between 1854 and 1857 north of Titirangi. Smythe used the land for wood and logging, as well as farming sheep and cattle. Smythe had a reputation for being miserly, and after passing left his property to his nephew. Konini Road was built during the 1920s, when the neighbouring Kaurilands estate was being developed as a subdividison. Southern Konini began to be subdivided along with Kaurilands between the 1920s and 1940s. Konini School opened in May 1976 on the site of a former orchard and dairy farm, when suburban housing was being constructed in the area.

== Demographics ==
Konini covers 2.36 km^{2} (0.91 sq mi) and had an estimated population of 5,150 as of June 2025, with a population density of 2,182 people per km^{2}.

Historical population
Year	Pop.	±% p.a.
2006	3,393	—
2013	4,689	+4.73%
2018	4,854	+0.69%
2023	4,926	+0.29%
The 2006 population is for a smaller area of 1.97 km^{2}. Source:

Konini had a population of 4,926 in the 2023 New Zealand census, an increase of 72 people (1.5%) since the 2018 census, and an increase of 237 people (5.1%) since the 2013 census. There were 2,433 males, 2,460 females and 33 people of other genders in 1,683 dwellings. 3.9% of people identified as LGBTIQ+. There were 1,089 people (22.1%) aged under 15 years, 831 (16.9%) aged 15 to 29, 2,460 (49.9%) aged 30 to 64, and 546 (11.1%) aged 65 or older.

People could identify as more than one ethnicity. The results were 74.2% European (Pākehā); 12.5% Māori; 11.6% Pasifika; 16.6% Asian; 2.7% Middle Eastern, Latin American and African New Zealanders (MELAA); and 1.9% other, which includes people giving their ethnicity as "New Zealander". English was spoken by 96.1%, Māori language by 2.1%, Samoan by 2.2%, and other languages by 18.2%. No language could be spoken by 2.1% (e.g. too young to talk). New Zealand Sign Language was known by 0.9%. The percentage of people born overseas was 30.3, compared with 28.8% nationally.

Religious affiliations were 26.2% Christian, 3.3% Hindu, 1.9% Islam, 0.5% Māori religious beliefs, 1.2% Buddhist, 0.4% New Age, 0.2% Jewish, and 1.9% other religions. People who answered that they had no religion were 57.9%, and 6.7% of people did not answer the census question.

Of those at least 15 years old, 1,308 (34.1%) people had a bachelor's or higher degree, 1,845 (48.1%) had a post-high school certificate or diploma, and 687 (17.9%) people exclusively held high school qualifications. 729 people (19.0%) earned over $100,000 compared to 12.1% nationally. The employment status of those at least 15 was that 2,205 (57.5%) people were employed full-time, 558 (14.5%) were part-time, and 93 (2.4%) were unemployed.

Individual statistical areas
Name	Area (km^{2})	Population	Density (per km^{2})	Dwellings	Median age	Median income
Glen Eden Konini (Note: Also included at Glen Eden.)	1.09	2,847	2,612	939	35.9 years	$50,800
Konini Road (Note: Also included at Titirangi.)	1.27	2,079	1,637	744	40.6 years	$55,100
New Zealand					38.1 years	$41,500

== Education ==
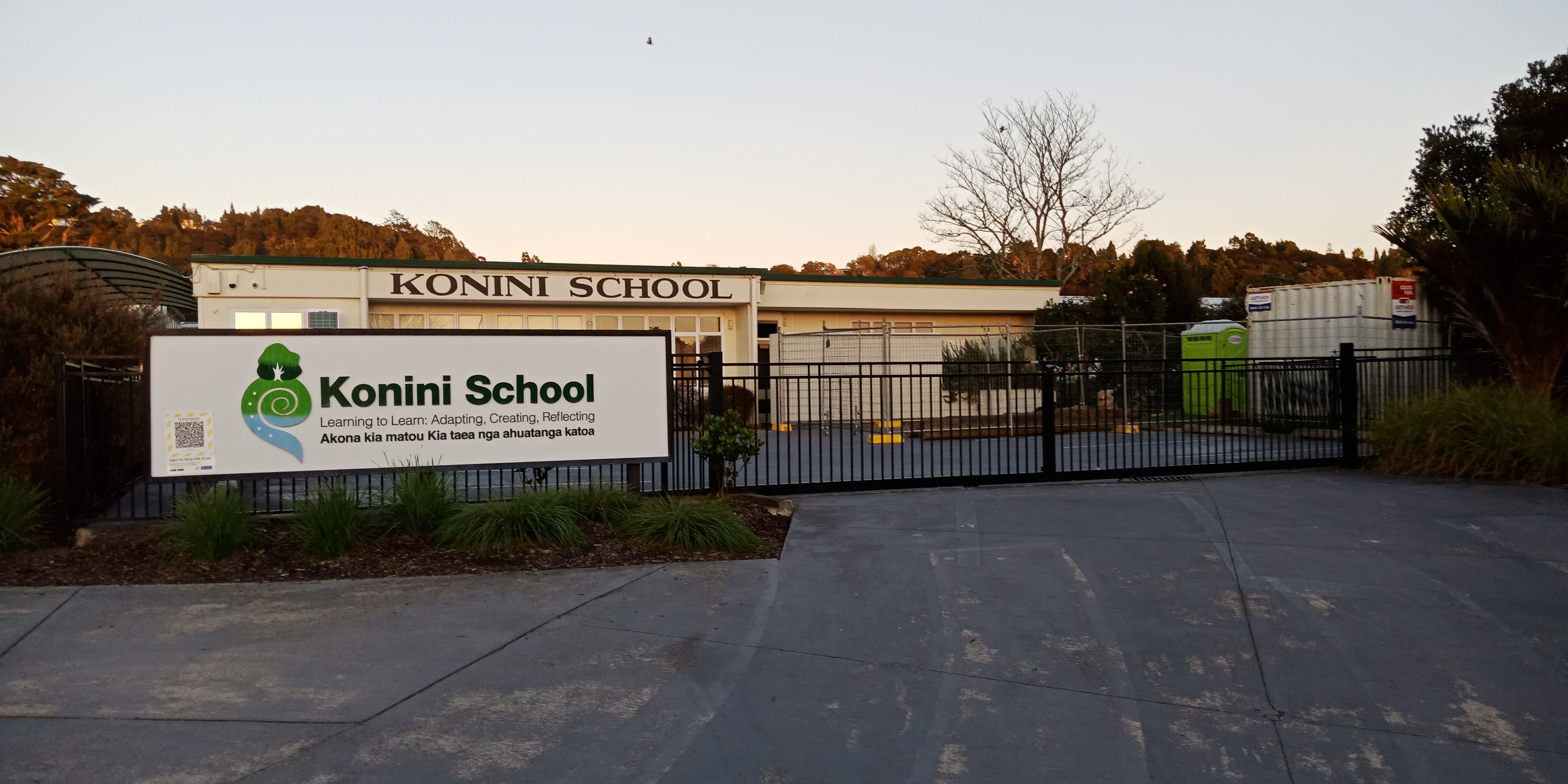
Konini School

Konini School is a coeducational contributing primary (years 1–6) school with a roll of 403 as of July 2025. The school opened in 1976.

The local State secondary schools are Kelston Boys' High School and Kelston Girls' College.
