= Project Twin Streams =

Initiatives centred on two streams in Auckland, New Zealand

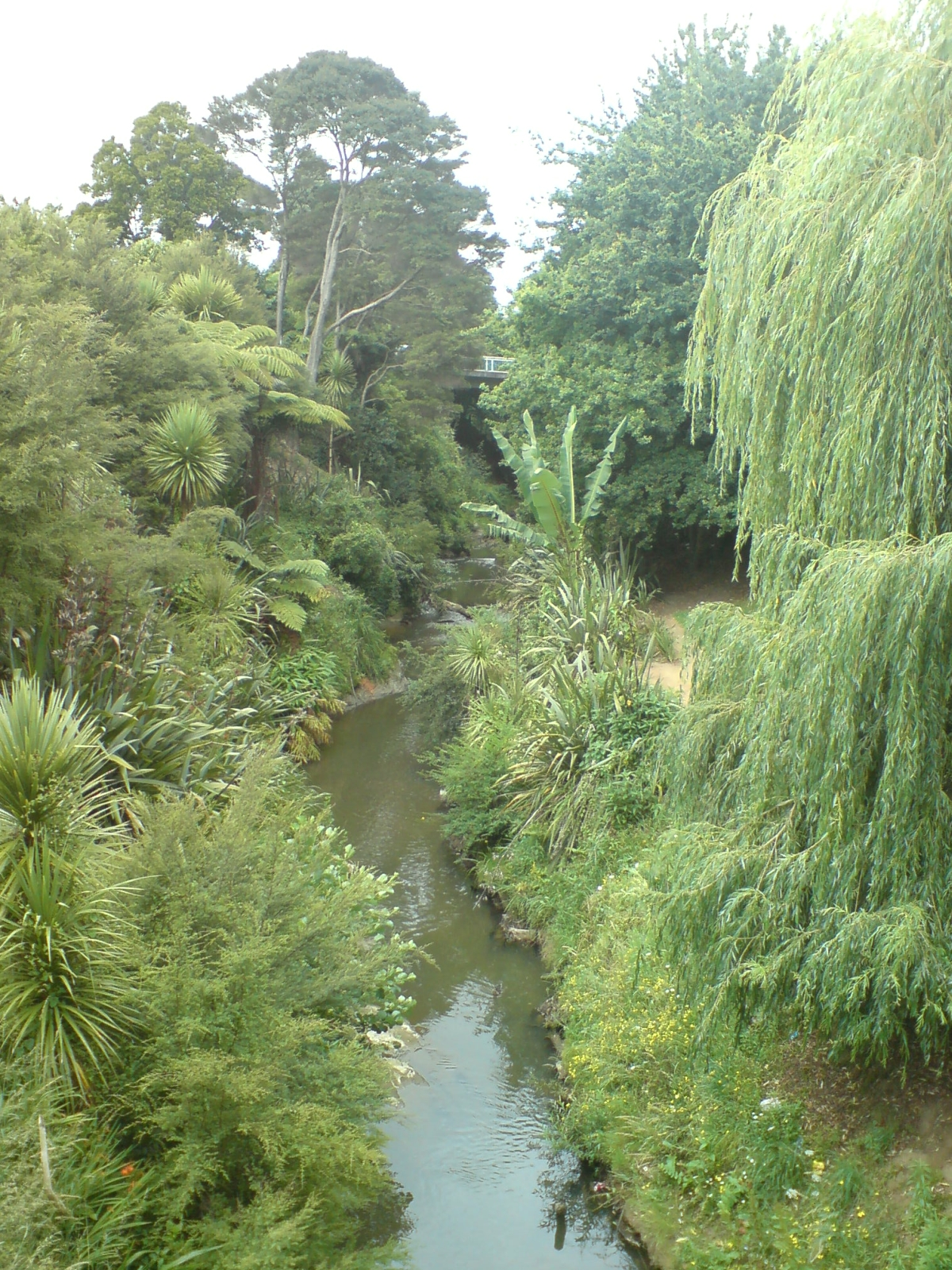
The Oratia Stream near the Henderson town centre.

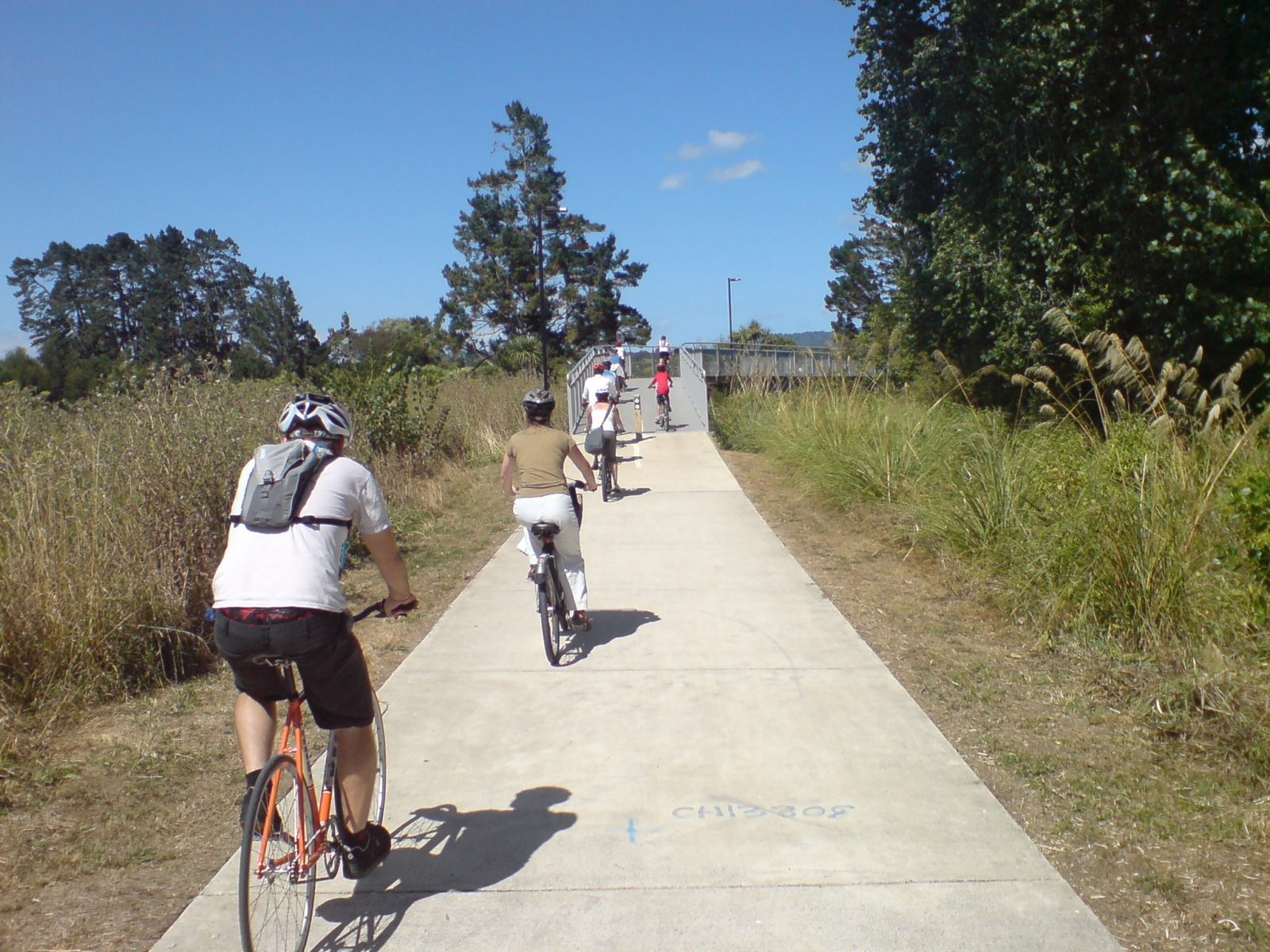
Cyclists on the walk- and cycleway.

Project Twin Streams is an umbrella name for a number of initiatives centred on two streams (Opanuku and Oratia) in the West Auckland, New Zealand. It consists of a number of environmental and community initiatives and infrastructure. This includes wetland restoration, largely carried out through volunteer work, partly to mitigate the effects of floodwaters from the Waitākere Ranges. The intent is also to protect/reclaim the 100-year flood plain from encroaching buildings and infrastructure. The project was achieved successfully, including 156 full and partial property purchases, despite a political decision not to use the legally available option of compulsory property purchases. The project focuses on the tributaries of Te Wai-o-Pareira / Henderson Creek and the Huruhuru Creek, including the Momutu Stream, Ōpanuku Stream, Oratia Stream and the Waikumete Stream.

The conservation works, both for the streams and the wider catchment, won second place in the Thiess International Riverprize in 2007.

== Walk- and cycleway ==
One of the most visible initiatives is the well-received Twin Streams Walk- and Cycleway, which allows residents and visitors to wander or ride most of the length of the two streams and some of their tributaries. The specification requirements included lighting for the path (which has since been installed, and provides extended use hours in the evening and morning, though not during some parts of the night), and at the time of installation, the lighting for the paths was the largest LED lighting project in New Zealand.

The 3m wide paths, with some 2.5m wide side paths, were funded by a combination of Infrastructure Auckland and Land Transport New Zealand grants / subsidies. The construction of the paths in the 2000s at that time included 5 bridges, 11 boardwalks, 5 retaining walls and a number of property purchases, for a total of slightly more than $10 million. The project also included a variety of local artworks, from ceramic tiles to cultural markers and kinetic sculptures, with a budget of $380,000.

The walk- and cycleways and its lighting won several awards, including:

- 2010 Illuminating Engineering Society - Lighting Design Award
- 2010 Royal Astronomical Society of NZ (RASNZ) - Dark Sky Award for Lighting
- 2009 NZTA and Living Streets Aotearoa Golden Foot Award - Best Practice Walking Facility
- 2009 Cycling Advocate Network (CAN) Avanti Award - Best Cycle Facility
