= Oratia Stream =

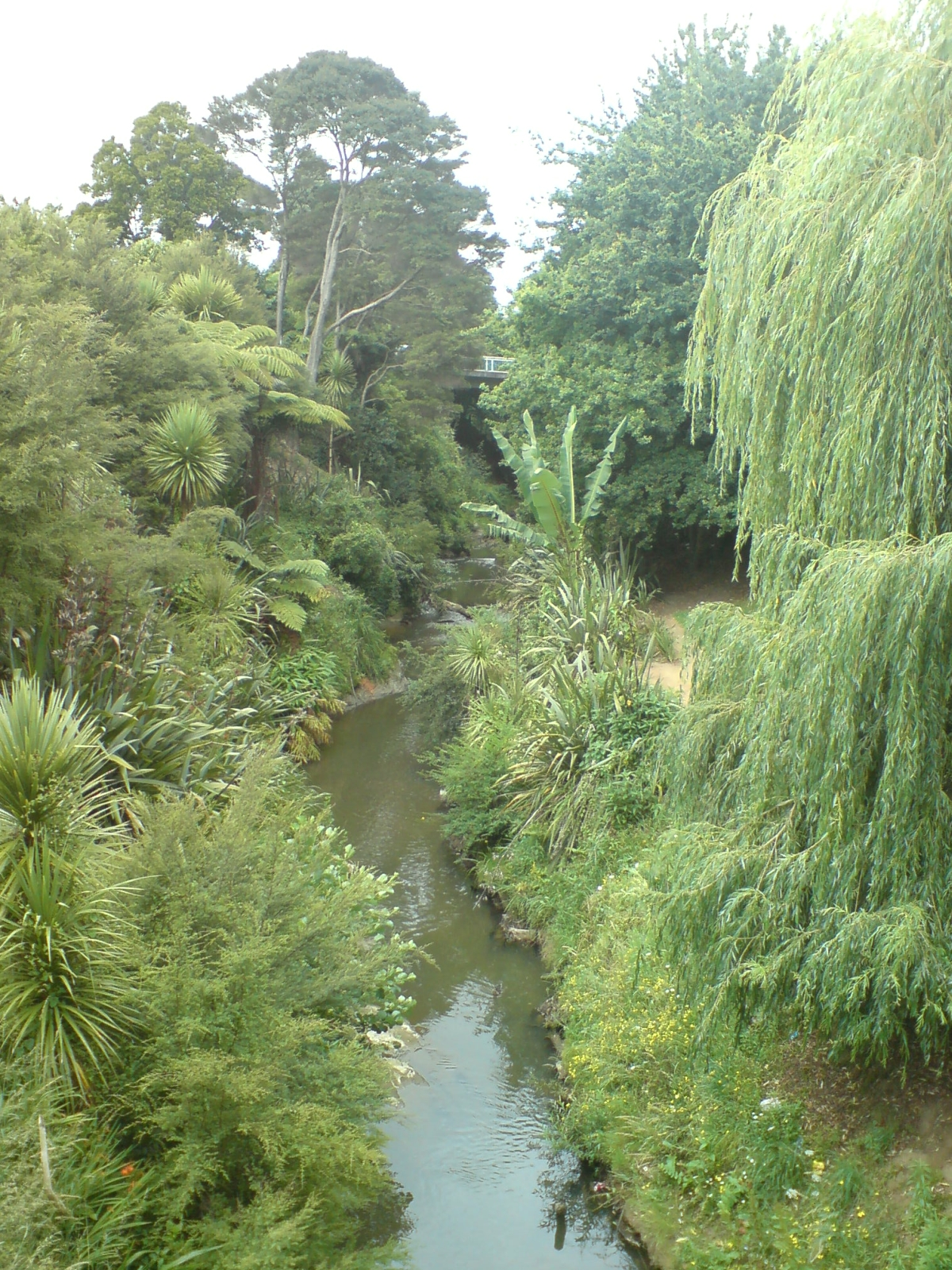
- The Oratia Stream near WestCity Waitakere

- Mouth of the Oratia Stream Oratia Stream (New Zealand)
- Route of the Oratia Stream

Location
- Country: New Zealand
- Region: Auckland Region

Physical characteristics
- Source
  - location: Waiatarua
- Mouth: Te Wai-o-Pareira / Henderson Creek
  - location: Henderson
  - coordinates: 36°52′21″S 174°38′6″E
- Length: 9 km (6 mi)

Basin features
- Progression: Oratia Stream → Te Wai-o-Pareira / Henderson Creek → Waitematā Harbour
- River system: Te Wai-o-Pareira / Henderson Creek

The Oratia Stream is a stream of the Auckland Region of New Zealand's North Island. It flows north-east from its source at the township of Waiatarua in the Waitākere Ranges, before entering into the Te Wai-o-Pareira / Henderson Creek, which flows into the western the Waitematā Harbour. After beginning at Waiatarua, the stream passes through the rural locality of Oratia and the West Auckland suburbs of Sunnyvale and Henderson. Since the mid-2000s, the Oratia Stream has been forested with native flora.

== Geography ==
The stream begins south of the Waiatarua, flowing north-east through the rural locality of Oratia. At Glen Eden, the stream changes course, flowing north-west towards Parrs Park. The stream meets the Waikumete Stream and the Millbrook Esplanade in the suburb of Sunnyvale, and continues to flow north, adjacent to the WestCity Waitakere shopping centre in Henderson. At Te Kōpua (modern-day Falls Park / Tui Glen Reserve), the stream becomes Te Wai-o-Pareira / Henderson Creek, an estuarine arm of the Waitematā Harbour.

The stream has six tributaries. Five of these, the Potter Stream, Bendall Creek, Cantys Stream, Cochran Stream and Kaurimu Stream, flow in rural Oratia, while one the Waikumete Stream, flows north from Titirangi through Glen Eden.

The land adjacent to the stream form an alluvial flood zone, which was historically forested by tōtara, tītoki and west coast kōwhai. The stream is a location where a population of the freshwater crab Amarinus lacustris is found.

== History ==
The stream is in the traditional rohe of Te Kawerau ā Maki, Radiocarbon evidence shows occupation of the Oratia Stream from at least the 16th century. The name is taken from the pā which existed on the western banks of the stream in modern-day Oratia/Sunnyvale, near Holdens Road. Oratia is the traditional name for areas of the middle and lower catchments of the stream, while the upper catchment near Waiatarua was known as Waihorotiu, due to the landslips which often occurred there. The end of the Oratia Stream, Te Kōpua (modern-day Falls Park / Tui Glen Reserve), was the location of a strategic Te Kawerau ā Maki pā, as this was the end point where Te Wai-o-Pareira / Henderson Creek could be navigated by canoe. Carbon dating of shells in the bottom layer of a midden near the Oratia pā showed occupation from at least 1570.

The Oratia Stream was first milled for kauri timber in 1841 by early settler Thomas Canty, who obtained logging rights in the area in 1843. In the mid-19th century, European settlers used the stream to drive logs downstream to Henderson. During early colonial days, the stream was known by the name Cantys Creek, a name now used for one of the steam's tributaries.

In 1855, the stream was dammed in the southern Henderson area by settler George Pirrit and his son William Pirrit. The Pirrits installed a water turbine, which they used to manufacture iron heel and toe plates for boots.

Between the mid-2000s and the 2020s, large-scale riparian planting was undertaken along the Oratia Stream as a part of Project Twin Streams.

== See also ==
- List of rivers of New Zealand
