= Playhouse Theatre, Glen Eden =

Theatre in Auckland, New Zealand

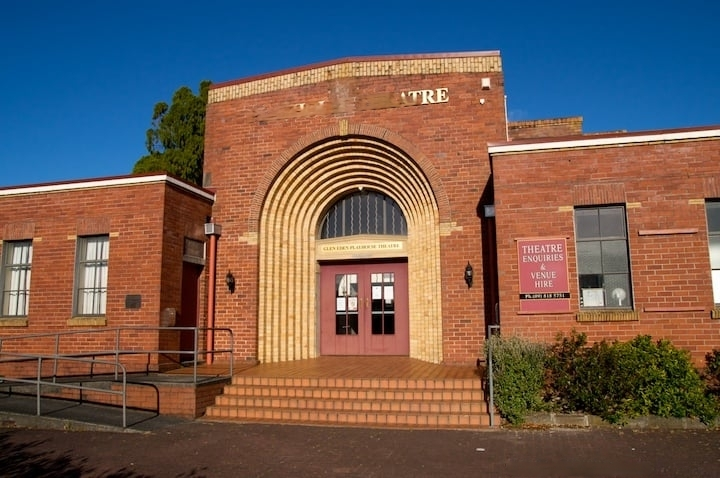
- Former names: Glen Eden Town Hall

General information
- Type: Performing arts venue
- Location: 15 Glendale Road, Glen Eden, Auckland, New Zealand
- Coordinates: 36.9109°S 174.6494°E
- Completed: 12 May 1937
- Renovated: February 2002

Design and construction
- Main contractor: W.C. Curtis

Renovating team
- Architect: Authur Marshall

The Playhouse Theatre is a performing arts centre situated in Glen Eden, New Zealand. The building was constructed in 1937 following a fire that destroyed the Glen Eden Town Hall that was on the site at the time. The Theatre has continued to serve West Auckland, initially for civic and community functions and events, moving into cinema and theatre productions by the 1970s when the name of the building officially changed to The Playhouse Theatre. Various theatre groups that had used the venue eventually amalgamated as the Waitakere Playhouse Theatre Trust in 1997. After considerable fundraising, the building was upgraded and in 2003 reopened as a modern performing arts facility.

== History ==
In 1901, at the site of the Glen Eden Playhouse Theatre, Glen Eden's first public hall was opened by local MP John Bollard. The social life of the Glen Eden community (then known as Waikumete) revolved around the hall, which was used to show films and hold town boards meetings, dances and political meetings.

In 1935, the hall burned down. A design for the replacement building was noted in the NZ Herald on 22 May 1935 as being a "modern version of a Georgian type...rectangular in shape with protruding wings at each corner...and the main auditorium, with a seating capacity of 500 and requisite kitchen and dressing rooms, a small library and municipal offices". When the new building was officially opened on 12 May 1937, it had Town Board Offices but was also "suitable to be used as a library, dance venue, for school and community events as well as Indoor Bowling tournaments". It was clear, however, that it would function primarily as a cinema and after the town offices and library moved, the building became known as the Star Theatre, a name it retained until 1972 when it officially closed due to "declining financial viability".

In 1967, there was a recommendation from the Glen Eden Borough Council's engineer that $1,400 be spent on repairing the building. In light of this, and the possibility of a projected loss of income from the Theatre, a motion was put forward by member of the Glen Eden Borough Council for there to be an appraisal of the costs for maintenance and repairs on the theatre building. The Council decided to proceed with the repairs, but supported the motion for a full appraisal. It was noted in 1970 that there should be an upgrade, and a motion was passed that Council would approve the proposed upgrades, as long as local ratepayers endorsed them. The Council sent out circulars to all ratepayers in the area, calling for a public meeting to discuss this. The future of the Theatre continued to be uncertain. In February 1971, there was a discussion at the Council that questioned its viability and relevance to the local community, with the Mayor expressing concern at the low level of interest shown by ratepayers in the proposed upgrade.

At that time, three local theatre groups – St. Thomas's Light Opera Club, Western Players and Auckland Children's Light Opera Society - successfully applied to the Glen Eden Borough Council and obtained the lease of the hall, allowing them to change its name to the Playhouse Theatre and operate independently as Playhouse Productions which became an incorporated society in 1973. Ian Wood and Jack Lawrence recalled that after the lease was acquired, a lot of work needed to be done to bring it up to standard, and "truckloads of rubbish, junk, general bric-a-brac dating back to the Second World War were carried away and dumped, an enthusiastic game of members scrubbed and cleaned, ironed the new curtains, nailed down carpet and got the building to a basic working state". In October 1972, the first public performance, A Night of Variety was staged by Playhouse Productions. It was said "to have included many acts such as: 'Z Cars' by Glen Eden Primary School, Patricia House 'a singer' and Sun and Rain Folk singers". Between 1972 and 1992 Playhouse Productions staged over 87 shows, including musicals, children's shows and plays.

== Waitakere Playhouse Theatre Trust ==
Playhouse Productions did receive $10,000 from the Portage Licensing Trust. Still, at that time, it was not possible to use community grants to upgrade Council-owned buildings, so in 1997 the Glen Eden Playhouse Theatre Trust (later to be named Waitakere Playhouse Theatre Trust) with one Council representative on its Board, was formed and successfully applied for further community funding grants. This money was used to remodel the Front of the House, improve the supper room and add air conditioning to a redesigned auditorium with an orchestra pit. In 2003, the new building had a Gala Opening attended by "local dignitaries and many of the people who helped to bring this huge project to fruition". After opening the upgraded building, the Waitakere City Council agreed to pay a further $250,000 to complete the work. Funded and supported by Waitākere Ranges Local Board the Theatre has continued to be used by their resident company, Playhouse Theatre Incorporated, as well as other organisations that present a variety of performing arts events in the venue each year.

In 2004, the Trust got a grant of $25,000 from what was at the time the Waitakere Council, and part of this money was to employ Sheryl Watson as a part-time theatre manager. A regular contributor to The Titirangi Tatler - a community newsletter, later renamed The Fringe - Watson initiated discussions about the Theatre's history and role in the community, and provided information about upcoming productions. In the Titirangi Tatler in February 2008, Watson noted that, following the nomination of the Theatre by a member to a competition for a "deserving community organisation", the Playhouse won a grand piano and funding of $5000 to run training workshops. In November of the same year, she announced that conductor Brigid Ursula Bisley would bring an orchestra made up of local musicians to perform. In a 2012 article on Auckland's community theatres in the NZ Herald, Watson noted, "people come to a live show, and they get bitten by the bug. For those who join, there's a real buzz about taking part in a production and being there from the first read-through of the script to seeing it all come together with the huge number of elements involved". In 2014, however, the chair of the Trust, Stan Henshaw said that it was no longer viable to have a theatre manager due to financial constraints.

In 2018 Janet Clews, former mayor of Glen Eden noted that there was "no formal connection between the Waitakere Playhouse Theatre Trust and Council...[and it was hoped]...the Trust can be encouraged to work with the Local Board to ensure that this longstanding community building will be treasured and enhanced into the future in a mutually supportive way". Minutes of the meetings of the Waitakere Ranges Board give examples of the working relationship between the Trust and the council. On 22 November 2018, the Board's minutes recorded acceptance of the presentation on the Playhouse Theatre Trust's proposed building additions. Schedule 2 - Local Board Plan Outcome 4, noted that while the Glen Eden Playhouse had some maintenance and management issues, the 'Annual Poetry Grand Slam' and the production 'Sightings' were both presented to good audiences. Concept sketches for planned additions to the Theatre were also tabled.

In February 2019, Greg Presland, Chair of the Local Board, posted a draft charter for Glen Eden based on a report commissioned by Unitec to inform the implications of change for the suburb. Significantly, Presland recommended in the charter that the Local Board would encourage the greater use of The Playhouse.

At the Waitakere Ranges Local Board meeting on 26 November 2020, the Trust delivered a presentation intended "to bring the local board up to date with what is happening with the community theatre... offering two solutions for moving forward". In the minutes of this meeting it was moved and carried that the Waitākere Ranges Local Board "receive the presentation and thank Phil Wilkinson and Gary Daverne, ONZM for their attendance...note the significant contribution of the Glen Eden Playhouse Theatre heritage building and its activities to the identity and vibrancy of Glen Eden".

== Installation of the Wurlitzer organ ==
In 2017, it was confirmed that the Wurlitzer organ housed at the Hollywood Cinema in Avondale, Auckland was going to be moved to the Playhouse Theatre. Stan Henshaw, the Executive Director of Playhouse Theatre Trust said that "housing the Wurlitzer would be the first stage in a planned expansion of the Playhouse Theatre", in a project that required fundraising to meet the likely cost of $900,000.

== Selected performances ==
- Spamalot, a musical based on a screenplay written by members of Monty Python, was performed at the Theatre in 2019. Directed by Chris Lane, the show received a positive review that noted a sense of fun amongst the audience due to "offbeat humour, satire, slapstick and irony ...[with]... perfect delivery of lines requiring pitch, pause and pace in all the right places".
- Beauty and the Beast (2018) was a performance seen by one reviewer as reflecting a risk by the Theatre in being the first community centre to produce a 'next-gen' show where everybody involved was under the age of 18. The director Matt Billington was given accolades in the review for having created "effective and original transitions of time and place...everything was smooth and kept the audience engaged...the set was interesting and there was never a dull moment".
- On 28 June 2017, a press release in Scoop previewed an upcoming Playhouse Theatre show, Dominion Rd The Musical and writer and co-lyricist Renee Liang explained that the musical was a way to make the point Dominion Road, a diverse area in Auckland that has been home to migrants from many cultures, should not be 'upgraded' as the Auckland Council was planning to do at the time. Before the production began, the cast "took part in a workshop in July 2016 where they shared their stories, languages and histories and created characters inspired by these elements".
- A show, described by its creator Richard Manic, a.k.a. Captain Festus McBoyle, as "very tongue-in-cheek...a lot like old-school pantomime", and something that audiences can expect to see as "absolute chaos", was previewed for performance at the Theatre on 13 September 2015.
- In 2014/2015, Gary Daverne directed three children's musicals at the Playhouse Theatre, including The Rockin' Tale of Snow White, Cats of Ponsonby and Robyn Hood - Outlaw Princess.
- As part of the Going West Festival, 2012, an adaptation for the stage of the novel Where We Once Belonged was presented at the Playhouse Theatre. The play, set in a village in Samoa, explored the role of individuality when a person's identity was closely tied to groups such as family, church or community, with one reviewer describing the performance as "exuberant, hilarious and humane".
- Paper Sky - A Love Story was presented at the Theatre in March 2011. Reviewing the performance, James Wenley called the design work "breathtaking", with a musical score sounding "magical and fantastic". While he had some "quibbles" about the story being driven mostly by the images, Wenley concluded that there was "much to love through and many moments of awe and beauty".
- Jesse Peach directed Blood Brothers at the Theatre in 2008 and the NZ Herald judged that "while it doesn't have the design aesthetic or big budget polish of a professional production, this show [was] a heartfelt retelling of the story that captures the ups and downs of working-class life with a rambunctious sentimentality".
- Equus, regarded as a psychological thriller, had been performed over 1000 times in London and Broadway and won a 1974 Tony Award, before producer Jesse Peach who had staged it previously in Auckland, said that he was pleased to be bringing the show to the Glen Eden Playhouse Theatre in 2007. The play dealt with issues such as cruelty to animals and troubled youth and had according to Peach a "plot full of religious imagery and forceful questions about the nature of life in a godless society".
- In 2007, Interacting Theatre, a disability arts advocacy group ran drama workshops throughout Auckland and performers from these workshops went on to star in the Glen Eden Playhouse production of The Deadly House party. In 2011, Paula Crimmens who was founder and director of Interacting Theatre facilitated what was to become an annual event known as the InterACT Disability Arts Festival, at Corban Estates Arts Centre and Glen Eden Playhouse Theatre. Crimmens said she wanted to "present a festival specifically for disabled people so they could feel at home and able to enjoy a whole range of arts activities...[and]... to open people's eyes to what's possible, and the contributions disabled people make to the fabric of their local communities".
