= Oratia =

- Suburb
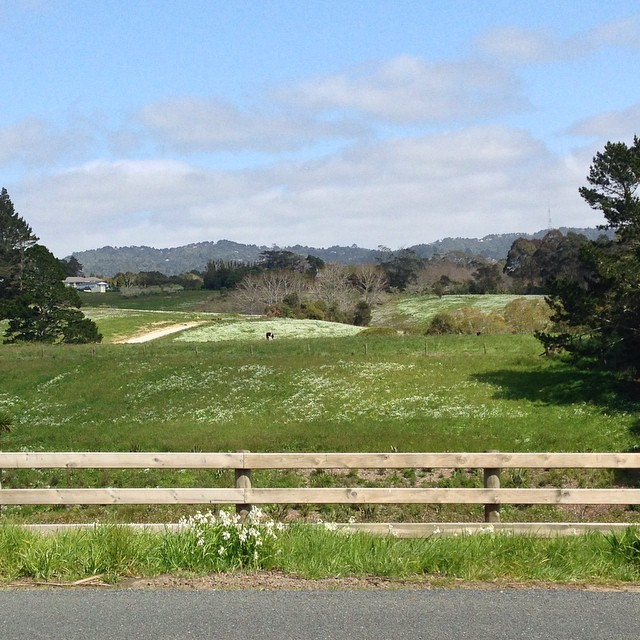
- Rural view in Oratia looking towards the Waitākere Ranges.
- Interactive map of Oratia
- Coordinates: 36°55′S 174°37′E
- Country: New Zealand
- City: Auckland
- Local authority: Auckland Council
- Electoral ward: Waitākere ward
- Local board: Waitākere Ranges Local Board

Area
  - Land: 1,719 ha (4,250 acres)

Population (June 2025)
  - Total: 2,190
  - Density: 127/km^{2} (330/sq mi)

Henderson Valley	McLaren Park	Sunnyvale
Waiatarua	Oratia	Glen Eden
Titirangi	Laingholm	Konini

Oratia is a semi-rural locality on the western edge of metropolitan West Auckland in New Zealand.

It is approximately 16 km (9.9 mi) to the south west of Auckland CBD (Central Business District), and sits at the eastern edge of the Waitākere Ranges Heritage Area. It is a relatively quiet community, bridging metropolitan Auckland with the wild forests and beaches of western Auckland.

The New Zealand Ministry for Culture and Heritage gives a translation of "place of long-lingering sun" for Ōrātia.

== Geography ==
The Oratia area is located at the foothills of Waitākere Ranges, forming a large portion of the Oratia Stream catchment, which flows north north-east towards Henderson. Central Oratia forms a part of the Waitematā-Waitākere foothills ecological zone. Sheltered from the Tasman Sea by the Waitākere Ranges, the area was traditionally dominated by forests of kauri, Phyllocladus trichomanoides (tānekaha or celery pine) and rimu, with abundant nīkau palm and silver fern. The soils are a mix of Miocene Waitākere volcanic soil and Waitemata Group sedimentary rock. The north-eastern lowlands in Oratia forms a part of the Waitematā lowland forests ecological zone, which historically featured a broadleaf forest of pūriri, tōtara, karaka and tītoki. The areas adjacent to the Oratia Stream form an alluvial flood zone, preferred by tōtara, tītoki and west coast kōwhai.

=== Climate ===
Climate data for Oratia (1951–1980 normals, extremes 1948–1979)
Month	Jan	Feb	Mar	Apr	May	Jun	Jul	Aug	Sep	Oct	Nov	Dec	Year
Record high °C (°F)	29.5 (85.1)	29.6 (85.3)	27.8 (82.0)	25.6 (78.1)	23.6 (74.5)	21.6 (70.9)	18.8 (65.8)	19.8 (67.6)	22.2 (72.0)	24.1 (75.4)	26.3 (79.3)	28.4 (83.1)	29.6 (85.3)
Mean maximum °C (°F)	27.2 (81.0)	27.3 (81.1)	25.9 (78.6)	23.4 (74.1)	20.8 (69.4)	18.5 (65.3)	17.3 (63.1)	18.0 (64.4)	19.4 (66.9)	21.4 (70.5)	23.5 (74.3)	25.5 (77.9)	27.9 (82.2)
Mean daily maximum °C (°F)	23.6 (74.5)	24.0 (75.2)	22.6 (72.7)	20.1 (68.2)	17.2 (63.0)	15.0 (59.0)	14.2 (57.6)	14.9 (58.8)	16.3 (61.3)	18.0 (64.4)	20.0 (68.0)	21.9 (71.4)	19.0 (66.2)
Daily mean °C (°F)	18.3 (64.9)	18.8 (65.8)	17.6 (63.7)	15.3 (59.5)	12.6 (54.7)	10.6 (51.1)	9.6 (49.3)	10.3 (50.5)	11.7 (53.1)	13.4 (56.1)	15.1 (59.2)	16.9 (62.4)	14.2 (57.5)
Mean daily minimum °C (°F)	13.0 (55.4)	13.5 (56.3)	12.6 (54.7)	10.4 (50.7)	8.0 (46.4)	6.1 (43.0)	4.9 (40.8)	5.7 (42.3)	7.0 (44.6)	8.8 (47.8)	10.1 (50.2)	11.8 (53.2)	9.3 (48.8)
Mean minimum °C (°F)	7.2 (45.0)	7.7 (45.9)	6.0 (42.8)	3.6 (38.5)	0.8 (33.4)	−1.4 (29.5)	−2.0 (28.4)	−1.2 (29.8)	0.5 (32.9)	2.4 (36.3)	3.6 (38.5)	5.8 (42.4)	−2.7 (27.1)
Record low °C (°F)	3.8 (38.8)	5.6 (42.1)	1.5 (34.7)	0.1 (32.2)	−2.1 (28.2)	−3.8 (25.2)	−4.1 (24.6)	−3.9 (25.0)	−2.1 (28.2)	−0.5 (31.1)	1.6 (34.9)	2.1 (35.8)	−4.1 (24.6)
Average rainfall mm (inches)	88 (3.5)	107 (4.2)	107 (4.2)	131 (5.2)	160 (6.3)	180 (7.1)	171 (6.7)	162 (6.4)	127 (5.0)	120 (4.7)	116 (4.6)	109 (4.3)	1,578 (62.2)
Source: NIWA

== History ==
=== Pre-European history ===
The area is within the traditional rohe of Te Kawerau ā Maki, an iwi that traces their ancestry to some of the earliest inhabitants of the Auckland Region. The area is named after the Te Kawerau ā Maki pā and kāinga, which was located near modern-day Holden's Road. Carbon dating of shell middens on the western banks of the Oratia Stream near the pā showed evidence of occupation from at least 1570. The name Oratia traditionally referred to the middle and lower catchment areas of the Oratia Stream, while the upper catchment was known as Waihorotiu, named for the landslips which would occur in the area.

A Te Kawerau ā Maki myth involving the naming of the location involves Hauāuru, the personification of the western wind, and his wife. His wife found a sunny spot in the lower Waitākere Ranges foothills, where her sunbathing was noticed by Tama-nui-te-rā, the personification of the sun. Hauāuru was angered by this, and took his wife back to the Waitākere Ranges. The name Oratia refers to the sunny location where Hauāuru's wife sunbathed.

=== European settlement ===
In 1845, early settlers John Bishop and Thomas Canty began felling bush in Oratia. Oratia was first settled in the 1860s, with 40-acre (160,000 m^{2}) land parcels granted to new immigrants. Cochrane's orchard was possibly the earliest orchard in the area dating back to this time, although it no longer exists. Sunnydale in Parker Road is the oldest surviving residence in West Auckland built around 1860 from kauri timber milled on the site. Oratia Cemetery has burial sites dating from 1867 onwards. The gateway entrance was built in 1935. Its Category II listing is attributed to historical and visual significance.

When the area was settled by Europeans, the name Sunnyvale was often used (however this eventually only referred to the Sunnyvale suburb to the north-east), and the Oratia Stream was given the name Cantys Creek.

Thomas Parr, a pioneer orchardist and nurseryman, bought a 35-acre (14 ha) section between the Oratia and Waikumete streams in 1853. He established a plant nursery called Albion Vale on West Coast Road in 1879. Now a Category I Listed Building, the house has been restored to its original design after being used for many years as "The Town and Country Roadhouse", which was considered to be one of the finest restaurants in Auckland in the 1940s. The small Oratia Folk Museum is adjacent to Albion Vale. It was originally a small settler cottage built around 1870. After a hailstorm in 1904 damaged large quantities of fruit, the Parr family opened one of the first fruit canneries in Auckland, called Atherton after Thomas Parr's wife, which shut in 1910.

The Oratia Valley was settled by Dalmatian migrants in the late 1890s and early 1900s. They planted orchards and vineyards, leading to Oratia becoming known as the fruit bowl of Auckland. A strong sense of community developed which continues today, although some of the old families have moved out of the area. Many of Oratia's roads are named after the families who lived in Oratia in the 1800s, e.g. Parker, Carter, Shaw, Parr. Many of the original orchards have now disappeared. Although still relatively sparsely populated compared to most of metropolitan Auckland, Oratia has developed into a community with many businesses and homes.

From the 1930s until 2007, the Oratia valley was the home of Knock na Gree Camp, a Catholic youth camp. The camp was sold in 2008, The camp is now run as Bella Rakha, a Buddhist retreat.

== Demographics ==
The Oratia statistical area, which includes Parau, covers 17.19 km^{2} (6.64 sq mi) and had an estimated population of 2,190 as of June 2025, with a population density of 127 people per km^{2}.

Historical population
Year	Pop.	±% p.a.
2006	1,839	—
2013	2,037	+1.47%
2018	2,151	+1.10%
2023	2,142	−0.08%

Oratia had a population of 2,142 in the 2023 New Zealand census, a decrease of 9 people (−0.4%) since the 2018 census, and an increase of 105 people (5.2%) since the 2013 census. There were 1,083 males, 1,044 females and 12 people of other genders in 711 dwellings. 5.0% of people identified as LGBTIQ+. The median age was 44.6 years (compared with 38.1 years nationally). There were 363 people (16.9%) aged under 15 years, 369 (17.2%) aged 15 to 29, 1,086 (50.7%) aged 30 to 64, and 321 (15.0%) aged 65 or older.

People could identify as more than one ethnicity. The results were 90.8% European (Pākehā); 8.8% Māori; 5.2% Pasifika; 5.7% Asian; 2.2% Middle Eastern, Latin American and African New Zealanders (MELAA); and 2.9% other, which includes people giving their ethnicity as "New Zealander". English was spoken by 98.0%, Māori language by 2.0%, Samoan by 0.7%, and other languages by 11.2%. No language could be spoken by 1.3% (e.g. too young to talk). New Zealand Sign Language was known by 1.0%. The percentage of people born overseas was 24.8, compared with 28.8% nationally.

Religious affiliations were 23.7% Christian, 1.1% Hindu, 0.1% Islam, 0.4% Māori religious beliefs, 0.6% Buddhist, 0.8% New Age, and 1.4% other religions. People who answered that they had no religion were 65.7%, and 6.4% of people did not answer the census question.

Of those at least 15 years old, 603 (33.9%) people had a bachelor's or higher degree, 909 (51.1%) had a post-high school certificate or diploma, and 261 (14.7%) people exclusively held high school qualifications. The median income was $50,200, compared with $41,500 nationally. 390 people (21.9%) earned over $100,000 compared to 12.1% nationally. The employment status of those at least 15 was that 969 (54.5%) people were employed full-time, 303 (17.0%) were part-time, and 45 (2.5%) were unemployed.

== Amenities ==
Despite its small size, Oratia has a number of amenities:

- Landsendt is a large sub-tropical garden considered to be of national significance. A range of rare plants are grown here, many originally sourced from South America, and now forming a rare plant "gene bank".
- Oratia Folk Museum is a specialist museum established in 1992.
- Oratia Native Plant Nursery is one of the earliest native plant nurseries in New Zealand.

== Notable people ==
Hugh Redgrove, a plant breeder from Oratia, introduced a Hebe named "Oratia Beauty" in 1982.

Ann Endt, an Oratia gardener, had a rose named after her.

Geoff Davidson of Oratia Native Plant Nursery received the Life Time Achievement Award from the New Zealand Plant Conservation Network in 2007 for his work to save species from extinction and being part of major initiatives to protect plants.

Graeme Gash of the folk rock band Waves was born and raised in Oratia.

== Education ==
Oratia District School, established in 1882, provides primary (years 1–6) education for the area. It has 24 classrooms, a learning centre, hall and lunch room. It has a roll of 438 students as of July 2026. It serves Oratia and a catchment area extending to the coast at Piha and Karekare. There is also a kindergarten located on the same site.

The Bruce McLaren Intermediate school in Henderson, named after the New Zealand racing driver, provides education for year 7 and 8 students.

The local state secondary school is Henderson High School.

Liston College and St Dominic's College in Henderson both offer Catholic education.
