= Ōpanuku Stream =

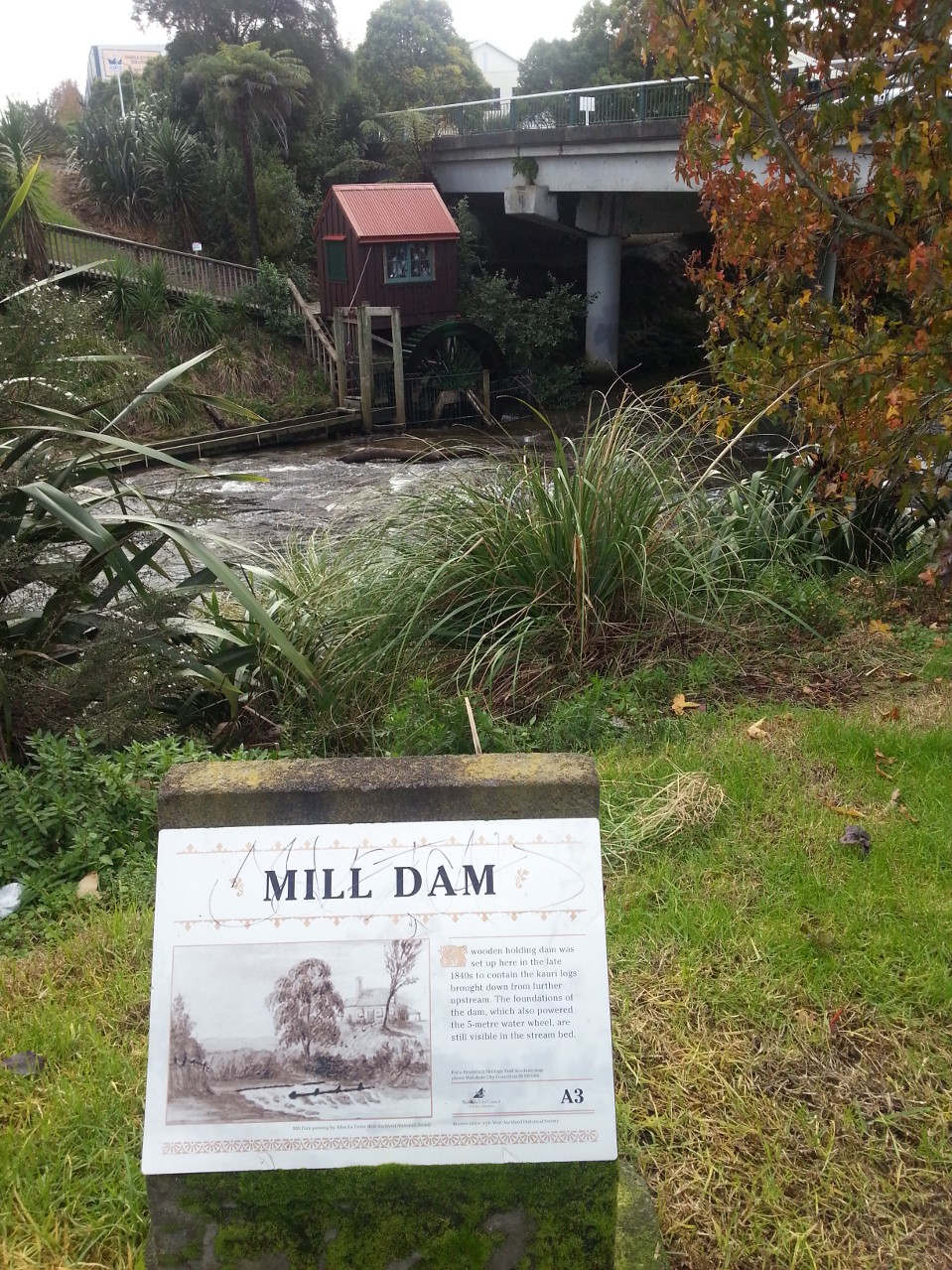
- Location of the Ōpanuku Stream mill dam in Henderson

- Mouth of Ōpanuku Stream Ōpanuku Stream (New Zealand)
- Route of the Ōpanuku Stream

Location
- Country: New Zealand
- Region: Auckland Region

Physical characteristics
- Source: Scenic Drive ridge, Waitākere Ranges
  - coordinates: 36.90672°S 174.54269°E
- Mouth: Te Wai-o-Pareira / Henderson Creek
  - location: Cranwell Park
  - coordinates: 36.87257°S 174.6349°E
- Length: 11 km (7 mi)

Basin features
- Progression: Ōpanuku Stream → Te Wai-o-Pareira / Henderson Creek → Waitematā Harbour
- River system: Te Wai-o-Pareira / Henderson Creek
- Tributaries
  - left: Pukearuhe Stream, Russell Stream, Gum Camp Stream
  - right: Spragg Stream, Stoney Creek, Parekura Stream, Driving Stream, Vella Stream, Anamata Stream, Waitaro Stream
- Bridges: Reconciliation Bridge, Coronation Bridge, Opanuku Bridge

The Ōpanuku Stream, formerly known as the Henderson Stream, is a stream of the Auckland Region of New Zealand's North Island. It flows east from its source the Waitākere Ranges through the Henderson Valley, then north-east through West Auckland before entering into the Te Wai-o-Pareira / Henderson Creek, which flows into the western the Waitematā Harbour. The stream passes through the rural locality of Henderson Valley and the West Auckland suburbs of Western Heights and Henderson. Since the mid-2000s it has been forested with native flora.

== Geography ==
The stream begins in the Waitākere Ranges, flowing east through the rural locality of Henderson Valley. In suburban Auckland, the river changes course, flowing north-east through Western Heights and Henderson. At Te Kōpua (modern-day Falls Park / Tui Glen Reserve), the stream meets Te Wai-o-Pareira / Henderson Creek, an estuarine arm of the Waitematā Harbour. The stream has five major tributaries in the Henderson Valley: the Pukearuhe Stream, Anamata Stream, Driving Stream, Parekura Stream and Stoney Creek.

The land adjacent to the stream forms an alluvial flood zone, which was historically forested by tōtara, tītoki and west coast kōwhai.

== Biodiversity ==
Large tōtara, kahikatea, tītoki, karaka, and kauri trees can be found on the banks of the stream, at Henderson Park.

== History ==
The stream is in the traditional rohe of Te Kawerau ā Maki, and was traditionally known as Te Wai-ō-Panuku ("The Stream of Panuku") or Ōpanuku. Ōpanuku was also a name used for the Henderson Valley in general. The stream is named after one of the oldest Te Kawerau ā Maki ancestors, Panuku, who was the wife of Parekura, and died after being kidnapped by Nihotupu. The stream represents the life force of Panuku.

Near Rua ō Te Whenua, the hill in the Waitākere Ranges where the stream begins, was one of the traditional burial areas of Te Kawerau ā Maki. The mid-section of the river is the location of Ōpareira, a former kāinga (unfortified settlement), while the Border Road Esplanade area in the lower stream was known as Waitaro, referring to the taro plants which grew there. The point where the Ōpanuku Stream meets Te Wai-o-Pareira / Henderson Creek (modern-day Falls Park / Tui Glen Reserve) was known as Te Kōpua, and was the location of a strategic pā for Te Kawerau ā Maki.

The stream was one of the first streams in West Auckland to be dammed for kauri logging in the 1850s. The river was used to transport logs from the Waitākere Ranges to the Henderson Mill.

The northern banks of the Ōpanuku Stream at Henderson became a vineyard for Lebanese New Zealander Assid Abraham Corban in 1907. In the late 1920s, a flood washed out the bridges that crossed the Ōpanuku Stream.

Between the mid-2000s and the 2020s, large-scale riparian planting was undertaken along the Ōpanuku Stream as a part of Project Twin Streams.

== See also ==
- List of rivers of New Zealand
