= Waikumete Stream =

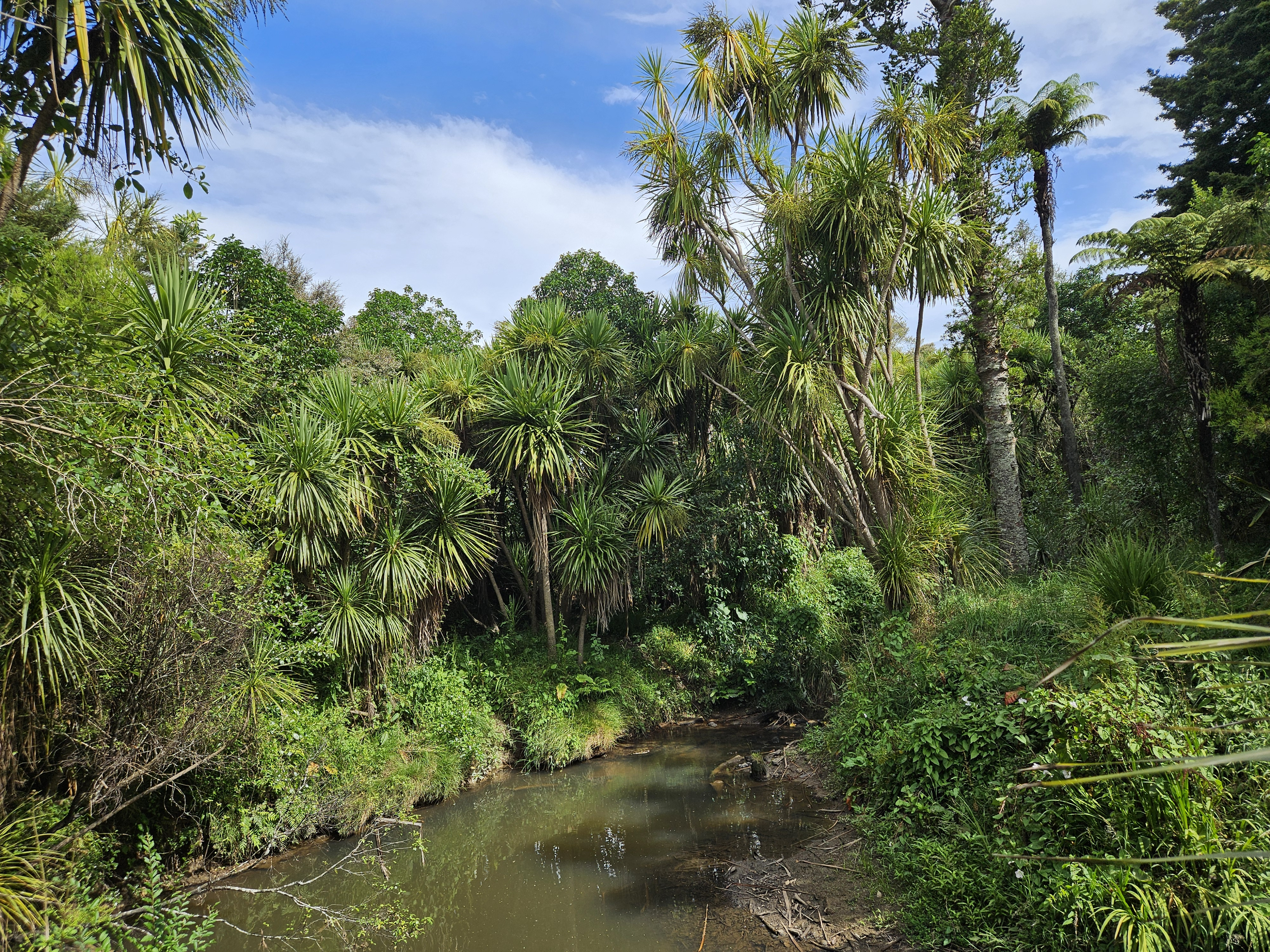
- The Waikumete Stream in Glen Eden

- Mouth of the Waikumete Stream Waikumete Stream (New Zealand)
- Route of the Waikumete Stream

Location
- Country: New Zealand
- Region: Auckland Region

Physical characteristics
- Source
  - location: Titirangi
  - elevation: 36.93661°S 174.65695°E
- Mouth: Oratia Stream
  - location: Sunnyvale
  - coordinates: 36°53′38″S 174°37′57″E
- Length: 6 km (4 mi)

Basin features
- Progression: Waikumete Stream → Oratia Stream → Te Wai-o-Pareira / Henderson Creek → Waitematā Harbour → Hauraki Gulf → Pacific Ocean
- River system: Te Wai-o-Pareira / Henderson Creek
- Tributaries
  - left: Hibernia Stream, Bishop Stream, Ambler Stream, Woodvale Stream, Waikaukau Stream, Tangutu Stream, Parrs Stream, Sherrybrooke Stream, Seymour Stream
  - right: Derwent Gully, Atkinson RD Stream, Waikura Stream, Taimona Stream, Waitakere Stream, Range View Stream

The Waikumete Stream is a stream of the Auckland Region of New Zealand's North Island. It flows north from its sources in Titirangi, before joining the Oratia Stream. Both bodies are tributaries of Te Wai-o-Pareira / Henderson Creek, which flows into the western Waitematā Harbour. The stream passes through the suburbs of Titirangi, Kaurilands, Glen Eden and Sunnyvale, and since the mid-2000s has been forested with native flora.

== Description ==
The stream begins north of Titirangi township, flowing north through the suburbs of Kaurilands and Glen Eden. At Glen Eden, the stream changes course, flowing north-west towards Parrs Park. The stream finishes its course at Millbrook Esplanade in the suburb of Sunnyvale, where it flows into the Oratia Stream.

The stream has a few tributaries, one being the Bishop Stream, which flows parallel to the Waikumete Stream to the west, flowing through Wirihana Park and Kowhai Reserve, meeting the Waikumete Stream at Ceramco Park.

The stream is a habitat for the New Zealand longfin eel, the short-finned eel, cran's bully, common bully (toitoi), redfin bully, New Zealand smelt, banded kōkopu, common galaxias (īnanga) and torrentfish (panoko).

== History ==
The stream is in the traditional rohe of Te Kawerau ā Maki. While the stream's traditional name has been lost, the upper catchments of Te Wai-o-Pareira / Henderson Creek were known as Ōkaurirahi, due to the large kauri trees in the area. When the area was settled by Europeans, the stream was given the name Waikumete, a name applied to the area (but originally referring to Little Muddy Creek to the south of Titirangi.) The area was milled for kauri timber in the mid-19th century. The stream was officially gazetted as the Waikumete Stream in 1988.

On 23 May 1992, the Waikumete Stream was polluted with tributyltin by a timber treatment yard, resulting in the death of wildlife and contaminated sediments over the next two years. Between the mid-2000s and the 2020s, large-scale riparian planting was undertaken along the Waikumete Stream, as a part of Project Twin Streams.

== See also ==
- List of rivers of New Zealand
