= Sunnyvale, Auckland =

Sunnyvale
- Suburb
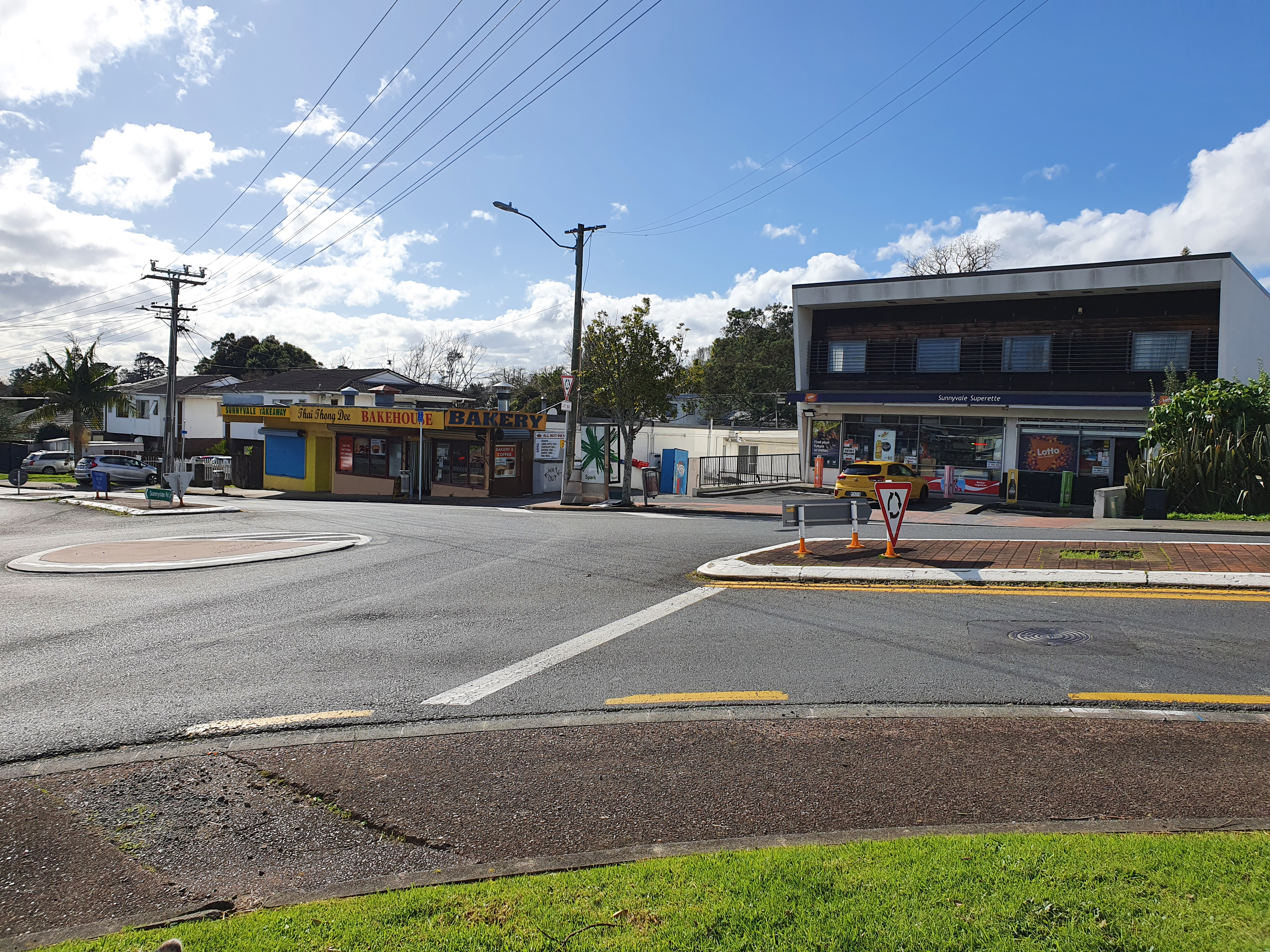
- Shops in Sunnyvale, West Auckland
- Interactive map of Sunnyvale
- Coordinates: 36°53′53″S 174°37′56″E
- Country: New Zealand
- City: Auckland
- Local authority: Auckland Council
- Electoral ward: Waitākere ward
- Local board: Henderson-Massey Local Board; Waitākere Ranges Local Board

Area
  - Land: 197 ha (490 acres)

Population (June 2025)
  - Total: 6,940
  - Density: 3,520/km^{2} (9,120/sq mi)
- Train stations: Sunnyvale railway station

Western Heights	Henderson	Glendene
Mclaren Park	Sunnyvale	Kelston
Oratia	Glen Eden	Glen Eden

Sunnyvale is a suburb of West Auckland, New Zealand. Sunnyvale is under the local governance of Auckland Council. Sunnyvale used to be an orchard and wine growing area in Auckland with West Brook Wines founded there.

== Geography ==
Sunnyvale is a suburb of West Auckland located north-west of the Waikumete Cemetery, due south of Henderson. Two of the major streams of West Auckland meet at Sunnyvale: the Oratia Stream and the Waikumete Stream, at McLaren Park.

Sunnyvale forms a part of the Waitematā lowland forests ecological zone. The free-draining soils and broad terraces provided a habitat that was ideal for large broadleaf trees, including pūriri, tōtara, karaka and tītoki.

== History ==
Sunnyvale was a name originally used to refer to both Sunnyvale and Oratia, the rural locality to the south-west. Over time the name was exclusively applied to Sunnyvale. Sunnyvale used to be an orchard and wine growing area, and was the location where West Brook Wines was founded.

== Demographics ==
Sunnyvale covers 1.97 km^{2} (0.76 sq mi) and had an estimated population of 6,940 as of June 2025, with a population density of 3,523 people per km^{2}.

Historical population
Year	Pop.	±% p.a.
2006	5,418	—
2013	5,025	−1.07%
2018	5,943	+3.41%
2023	6,333	+1.28%
The 2006 population is for a larger area of 3.50 km^{2}. Source:

Sunnyvale had a population of 6,333 in the 2023 New Zealand census, an increase of 390 people (6.6%) since the 2018 census, and an increase of 1,308 people (26.0%) since the 2013 census. There were 3,090 males, 3,210 females and 33 people of other genders in 1,851 dwellings. 3.0% of people identified as LGBTIQ+. The median age was 32.8 years (compared with 38.1 years nationally). There were 1,434 people (22.6%) aged under 15 years, 1,428 (22.5%) aged 15 to 29, 2,910 (45.9%) aged 30 to 64, and 561 (8.9%) aged 65 or older.

People could identify as more than one ethnicity. The results were 38.9% European (Pākehā); 17.3% Māori; 26.7% Pasifika; 32.8% Asian; 4.1% Middle Eastern, Latin American and African New Zealanders (MELAA); and 2.3% other, which includes people giving their ethnicity as "New Zealander". English was spoken by 92.0%, Māori language by 4.3%, Samoan by 9.0%, and other languages by 28.5%. No language could be spoken by 3.1% (e.g. too young to talk). New Zealand Sign Language was known by 0.5%. The percentage of people born overseas was 41.4, compared with 28.8% nationally.

Religious affiliations were 41.4% Christian, 7.3% Hindu, 4.2% Islam, 1.5% Māori religious beliefs, 1.8% Buddhist, 0.5% New Age, and 1.6% other religions. People who answered that they had no religion were 36.8%, and 5.5% of people did not answer the census question.

Of those at least 15 years old, 1,272 (26.0%) people had a bachelor's or higher degree, 2,229 (45.5%) had a post-high school certificate or diploma, and 1,386 (28.3%) people exclusively held high school qualifications. The median income was $43,800, compared with $41,500 nationally. 414 people (8.5%) earned over $100,000 compared to 12.1% nationally. The employment status of those at least 15 was that 2,715 (55.4%) people were employed full-time, 558 (11.4%) were part-time, and 201 (4.1%) were unemployed.

Individual statistical areas
Name	Area (km^{2})	Population	Density (per km^{2})	Dwellings	Median age	Median income
Sunnyvale West-Parrs Park	0.84	2,724	3,243	753	31.4 years	$42,000
Sunnyvale East	1.12	3,609	3,222	1,098	33.7 years	$45,300
New Zealand					38.1 years	$41,500

== Education ==
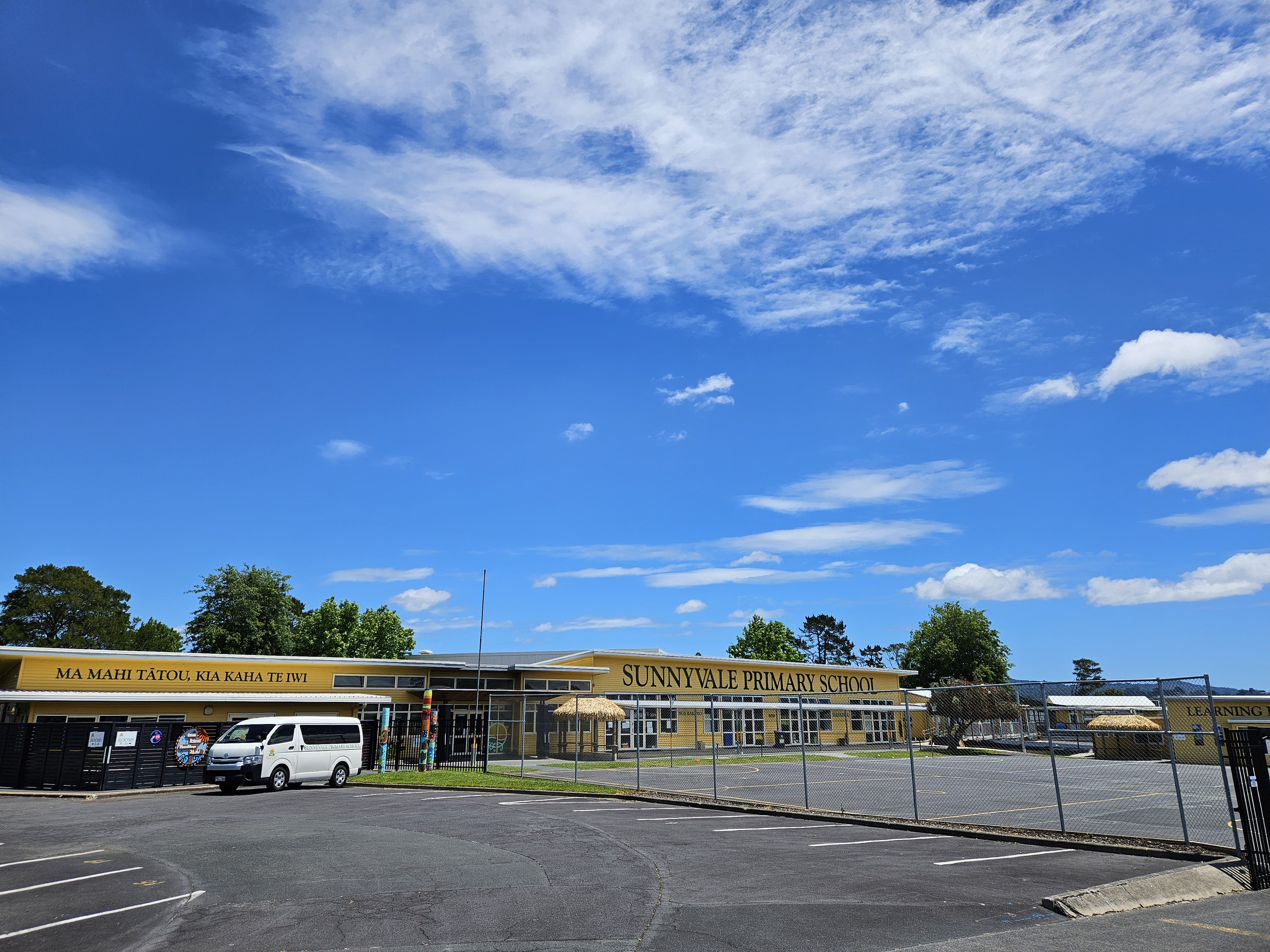
Sunnyvale Primary School in 2023

Local State primary and secondary schools include Sunnyvale Primary School, Holy Cross, Massey High School, Henderson High School, Liston College, and St Dominic's College. Sunnyvale Primary School is a coeducational contributing primary (years 1-6) school with a roll of 467 as of March 2026.
