= Henderson Valley =

Locality in New Zealand

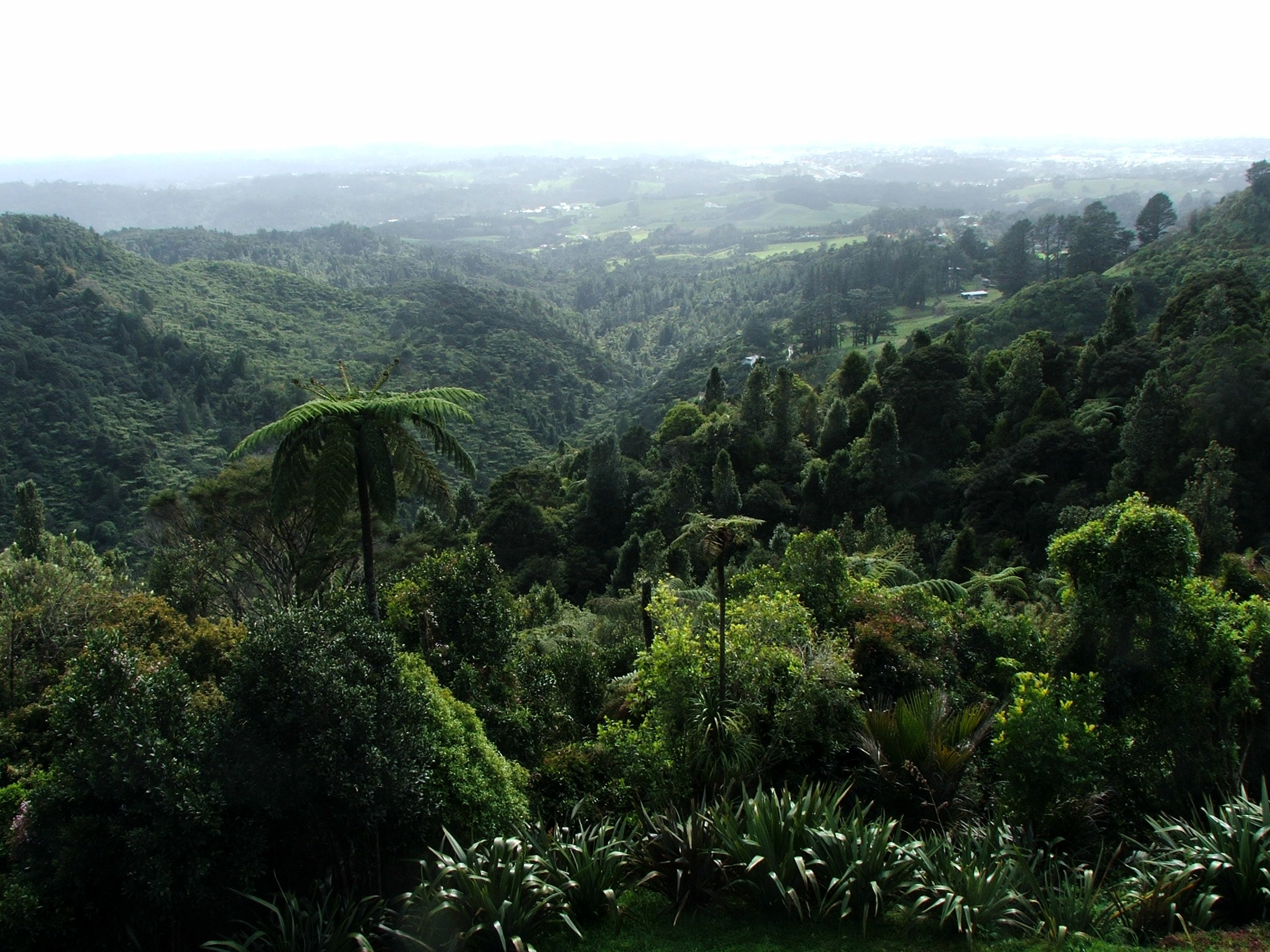
- Henderson Valley seen from the Waitākere Ranges
- Interactive map of Henderson Valley
- Coordinates: 36.907°S 174.587°E
- Country: New Zealand
- Region: Auckland
- Ward: Waitākere ward
- Local board: Waitākere Ranges Local Board
- Electorates: New Lynn; Tāmaki Makaurau

Government
  - Territorial Authority: Auckland Council

Area
  - Total: 15.04 km^{2} (5.81 sq mi)

Population (June 2025)
  - Total: 1,440
  - Density: 95.7/km^{2} (248/sq mi)

Henderson Valley is a locality in West Auckland, New Zealand. The major road in the locality is Henderson Valley Road, and Scenic Drive is on the western boundary.

== History ==
The Henderson Valley is in the traditional rohe of Te Kawerau ā Maki, and was traditionally known as Ōpanuku. Ōpanuku refers to one of the oldest Te Kawerau ā Maki ancestors, Panuku, the wife of Parekura who died after being kidnapped by a warrior named Nihotupu. Te Kawerau ā Maki had a settlement along the Opanuku Stream known as Ōpareira. The name refers to Pareira, the niece of early ancestor and voyager Toi-te-huatahi. Pareira lived at Te Wai-o-Pareira / Henderson Creek and would seasonally inhabit the Henderson Valley, harvesting the resources of the forest.

The Opanuku Stream which flows down the valley was one of the earliest waterways to be dammed for kauri logging in West Auckland, in the 1850s. The valley was settled by pākehā by the 1880s, with Henderson Valley Road providing access.

In the 1920s, the Henderson Valley Scenic Reserve/Carey Park was a popular picnic and swimming area known as Ferndale, where the Brown Owl Tea Rooms was located.

== Demographics ==
Henderson Valley statistical area covers 15.04 km^{2} (5.81 sq mi) and had an estimated population of 1,440 as of June 2025, with a population density of 96 people per km^{2}.

Historical population
Year	Pop.	±% p.a.
2006	1,341	—
2013	1,353	+0.13%
2018	1,440	+1.25%
2023	1,422	−0.25%

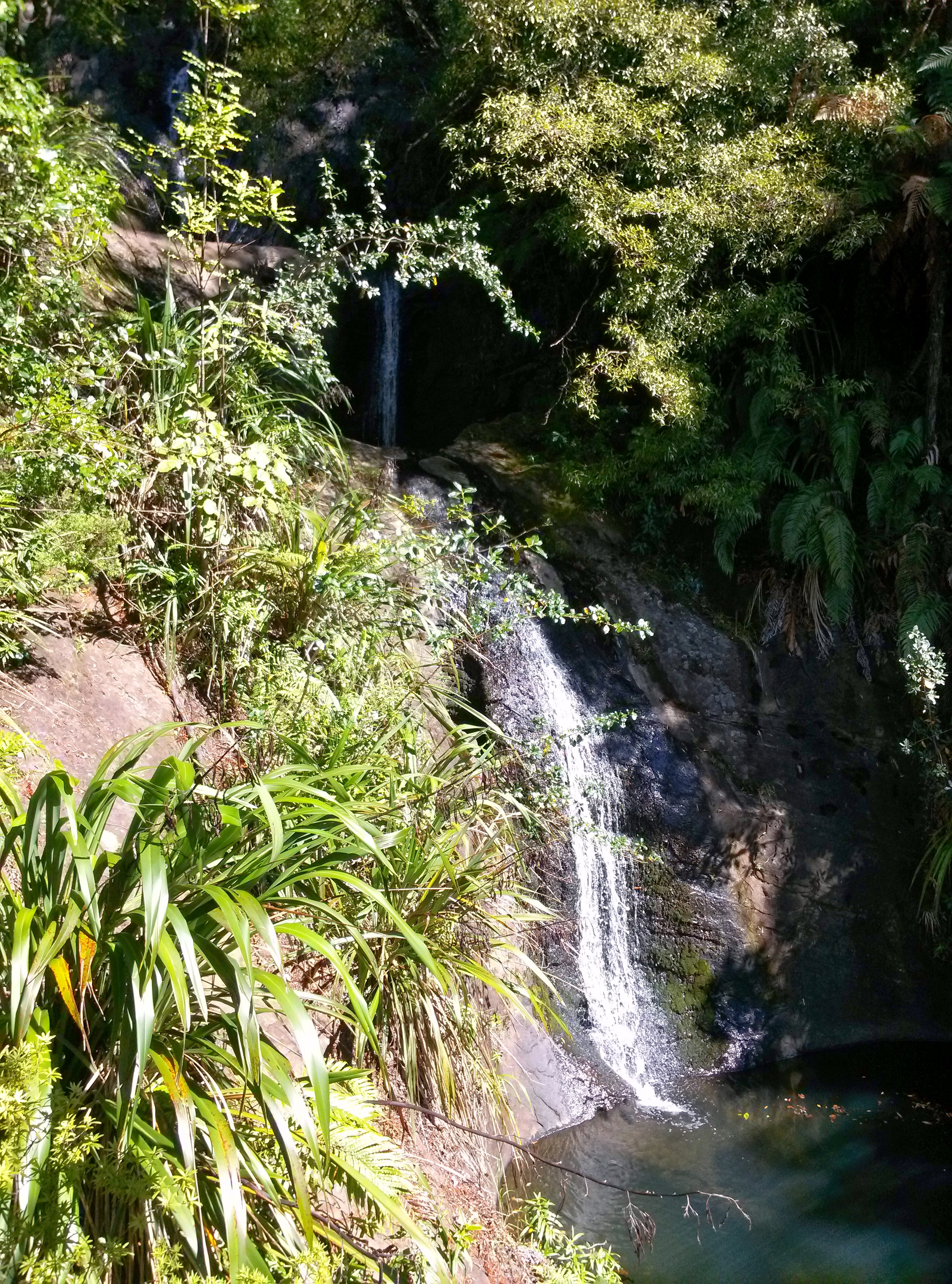
Fairy Falls which flow into a tributary of the Ōpanuku Stream

Henderson Valley had a population of 1,422 in the 2023 New Zealand census, a decrease of 18 people (−1.2%) since the 2018 census, and an increase of 69 people (5.1%) since the 2013 census. There were 735 males, 678 females and 12 people of other genders in 489 dwellings. 4.2% of people identified as LGBTIQ+. The median age was 42.5 years (compared with 38.1 years nationally). There were 264 people (18.6%) aged under 15 years, 237 (16.7%) aged 15 to 29, 726 (51.1%) aged 30 to 64, and 198 (13.9%) aged 65 or older.

People could identify as more than one ethnicity. The results were 86.9% European (Pākehā); 14.3% Māori; 7.8% Pasifika; 7.4% Asian; 0.8% Middle Eastern, Latin American and African New Zealanders (MELAA); and 2.3% other, which includes people giving their ethnicity as "New Zealander". English was spoken by 97.9%, Māori language by 1.9%, Samoan by 1.5%, and other languages by 12.2%. No language could be spoken by 1.3% (e.g. too young to talk). New Zealand Sign Language was known by 0.6%. The percentage of people born overseas was 23.6, compared with 28.8% nationally.

Religious affiliations were 25.9% Christian, 0.2% Hindu, 0.4% Islam, 0.6% Māori religious beliefs, 0.4% Buddhist, 0.4% New Age, and 1.3% other religions. People who answered that they had no religion were 62.2%, and 8.4% of people did not answer the census question.

Of those at least 15 years old, 318 (27.5%) people had a bachelor's or higher degree, 636 (54.9%) had a post-high school certificate or diploma, and 207 (17.9%) people exclusively held high school qualifications. The median income was $49,400, compared with $41,500 nationally. 201 people (17.4%) earned over $100,000 compared to 12.1% nationally. The employment status of those at least 15 was that 630 (54.4%) people were employed full-time, 177 (15.3%) were part-time, and 30 (2.6%) were unemployed.

== Education ==
Henderson Valley School is a coeducational contributing primary (years 1–6) school with a roll of 322 students as of July 2026. The school opened in 1915.
