= Te Wai-o-Pareira / Henderson Creek =

River in Auckland Region, New Zealand

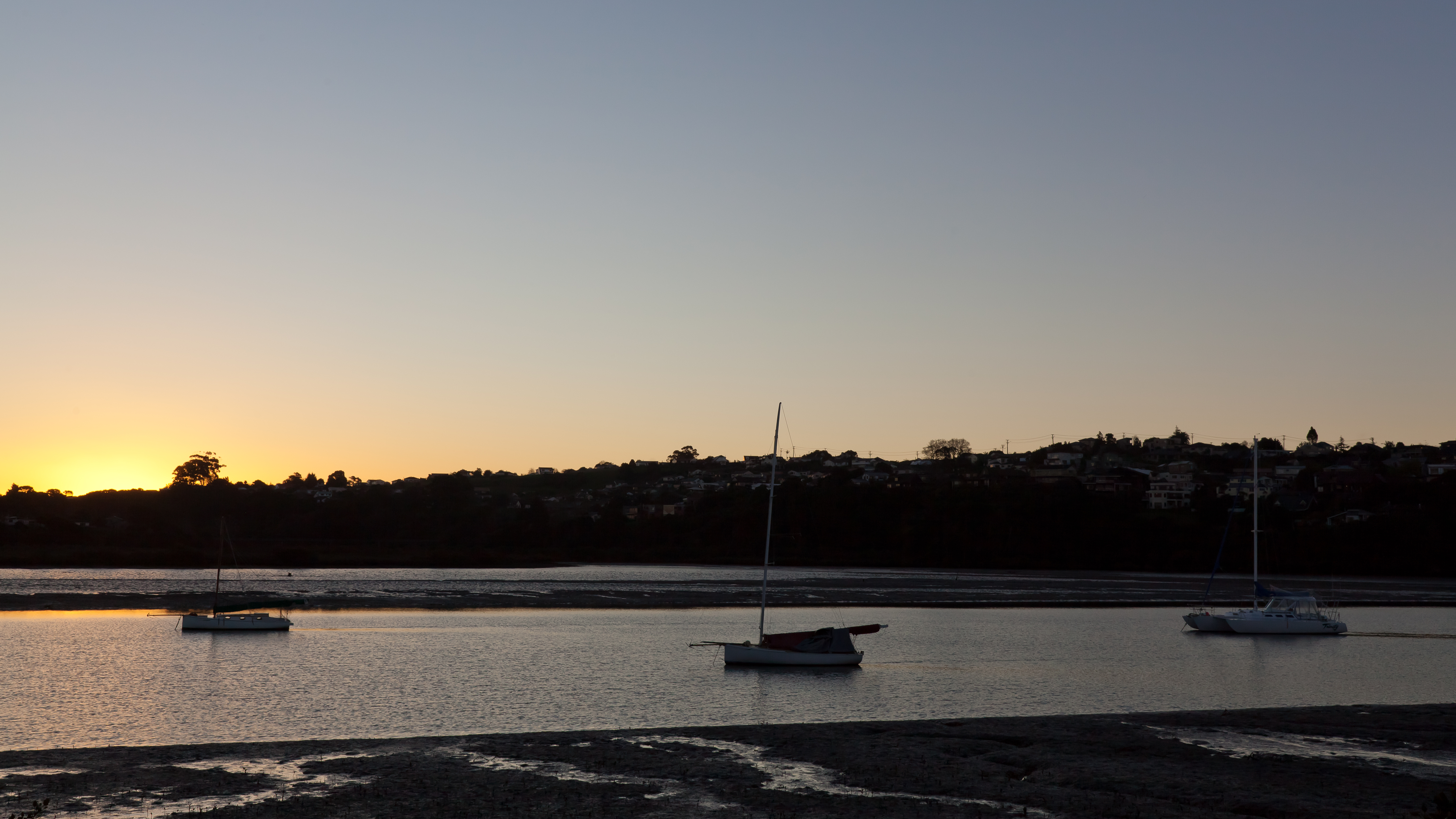
- Yachts in Te Wai-o-Pareira / Henderson Creek, looking towards the Te Atatū Peninsula

- Mouth of the Te Wai-o-Pareira / Henderson Creek Te Wai-o-Pareira / Henderson Creek (New Zealand)
- Route of the Te Wai-o-Pareira / Henderson Creek

Location
- Country: New Zealand
- Region: Auckland Region

Physical characteristics
- Source: Henderson
  - location: Confluence of the Opanuku and Oratia streams
  - coordinates: 36.872463°S 174.63499°E
- Mouth: Waitematā Harbour
  - coordinates: 36.82550°S 174.64262°E
- Length: 6 km (4 mi)

Basin features
- Progression: Te Wai-o-Pareira / Henderson Creek → Waitematā Harbour → Hauraki Gulf → Pacific Ocean
- Tributaries
  - left: Huruhuru Creek, Rarawaru Stream

The Te Wai-o-Pareira / Henderson Creek is a tidal creek in the Auckland Region of New Zealand. It flows north from its sources in the Henderson Valley and Titirangi, before reaching the western Waitematā Harbour.

== Geography ==
The section of the creek known as Te Wai-o-Pareira / Henderson Creek begins at the point when the Opanuku Stream and Oratia Stream intersect at Henderson; where tidal estuarine water from the Waitematā Harbour begins. The creek joins the Mānutewhau Creek at the western edges of the Waitematā Harbour. The south-western arm of the creek where the Momutu and Paremuka streams confluence is known locally as Huruhuru Creek, and traditionally by the name Wai Huruhuru Manawa.

Tributaries of Te Wai-o-Pareira / Henderson Creek include the Momutu Stream, Rarawaru Stream, Paremuka Stream, Ōpanuku Stream, Oratia Stream and the Waikumete Stream.

Much of the creek has been reforested with native bush. The International Walkway of Trees can be found in central Henderson on the banks of the creek, showcasing many varieties of non-native trees.

== History ==
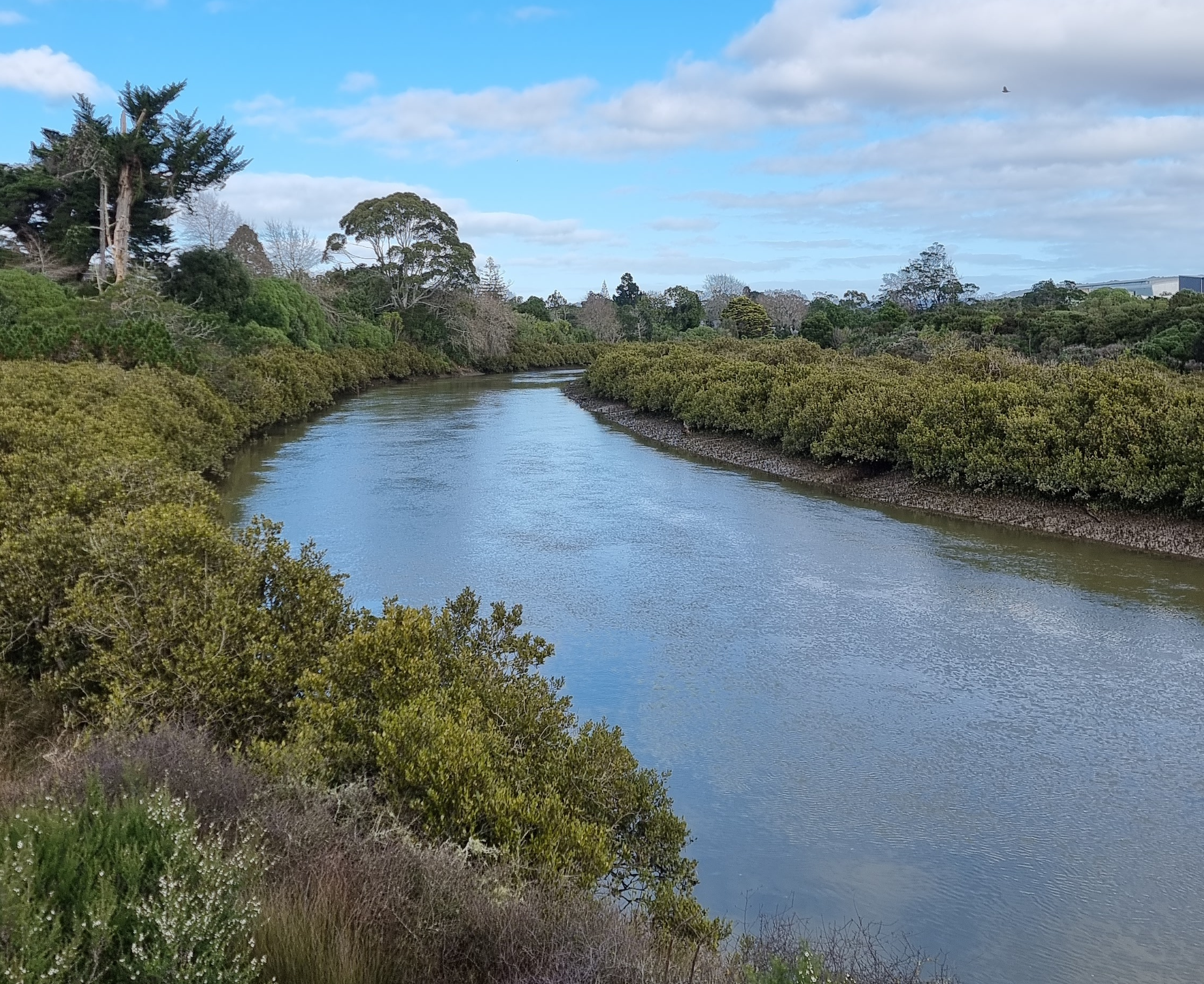
Te Wai-o-Pareira / Henderson Creek between Lincoln and Te Atatū South, looking southwards

The creek was known by Te Kawerau ā Maki and other Tāmaki Māori as Waipareira or Te Wai-o-Pareira, which references ancestor Toi-te-huatahi's niece Pareira. Te Kōpua (modern-day Falls Park / Tui Glen Reserve) was the end point for where Te Wai-o-Pareira / Henderson Creek could be navigated by canoe, making it the starting place for many on-land pathways, and was a strategic pā for Te Kawerau ā Maki. The lower section of Te Wai-o-Pareira / Henderson Creek was traditionally known as Maanu Te Whau, and was a place where cockles, pipi and oysters were collected.

Kauri timber was first logged on the western banks of Te Wai-o-Pareira / Henderson Creek in 1841, before pit-sawyers moved to the inland tributaries of the creek. The creek's tributary streams were used to transport kauri to the Henderson Mill, which operated on the banks of the creek from 1848 to 1868. In the early 1850s, the creek was known by the name Mill River, because of the Henderson mill. In the late 19th and early 20th centuries, Te Wai-o-Pareira / Henderson Creek was the location of a number of brick and pottery yards at Henderson and on the Te Atatū Peninsula, however the major brick industries in West Auckland were located to the south, along the Whau River.

In 1924, Tui Glen Reserve was established on the shores of the upper creek, and was the first motorcamp in New Zealand.

== See also ==
- List of rivers of New Zealand
