= Market Center (San Francisco) =

Buildings in San Francisco, California

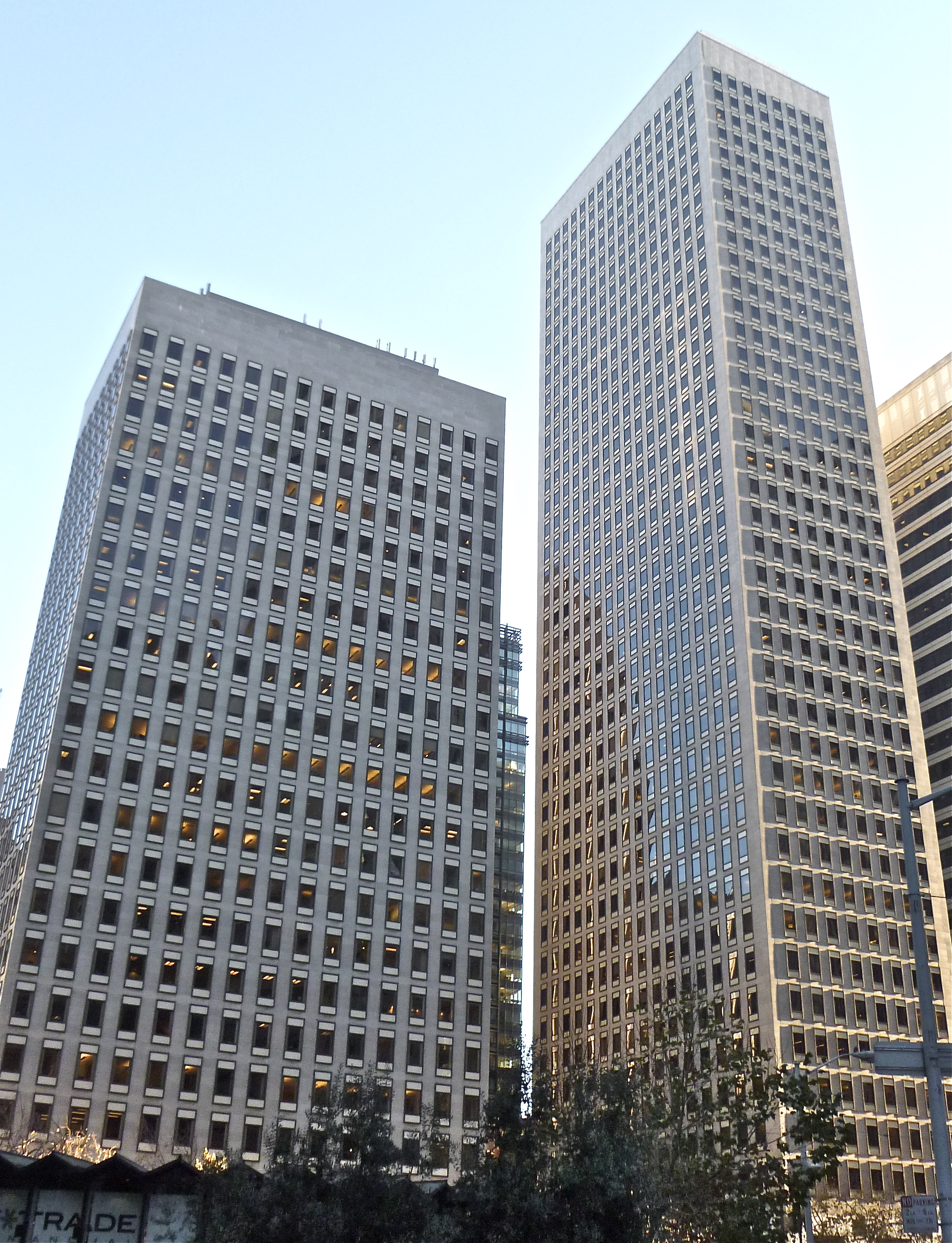
- 555 Market (left) and 575 Market (right)

- Location within San Francisco Location within California Location within the United States
- Former names: Standard Oil Buildings
- Alternative names: Chevron Towers

General information
- Type: Commercial offices
- Location: 555–575 Market Street; San Francisco, California
- Coordinates: 37.78955°N 122.4003°W
- Completed: 1964 / 1975
- Owner: Flynn Group

Height
- Roof: 94.79 m (311.0 ft); 174.65 m (573.0 ft)

Technical details
- Floor count: 22 / 40
- Floor area: 283,000 sq ft (26,300 m^{2}); 487,000 sq ft (45,200 m^{2})

Design and construction
- Architects: Hertzka & Knowles
- Structural engineer: H.J. Brunnier Associates

Market Center, formerly known as the Standard Oil Buildings and later the Chevron Towers, is a complex comprising two skyscrapers at 555–575 Market Street in the Financial District of downtown San Francisco, California. It served as the headquarters of the Chevron Corporation until 2001. As of 2025, it is owned by the Flynn Group.

575 Market Street is a 40-story, 175 m (574 ft) building completed in 1975, the taller of the two towers. 555 Market Street is the shorter tower at 95 m (312 ft) with 22 stories, and was completed in 1964. Architect for both buildings was Hertzka & Knowles. The two buildings are situated on a large mid-block property with a central, landscaped plaza. Both building exteriors are precast terra cotta panels above a granite base.

== History ==
Built by Standard Oil of California, later rebranded as the Chevron Corporation, Market Center was originally constructed and named Standard Oil Building Number 3 (555 Market) and Standard Oil Building Number 4 (575 Market). Chevron occupied the Market Center complex from 1965 until 2001 when it moved its headquarters to its campus in San Ramon, California. In 1999, Chevron sold the two buildings to Tishman Speyer and Travelers Real Estate Ventures for US$189.1 million and leased back the office space.

At the time the company officially moved its headquarters, it had already moved most workers to San Ramon, leaving only about 200 employees in San Francisco. By 2003, the complex was 83 percent vacant, and a joint venture between DivcoWest Properties and RREEF Management Company bought the property for US$79.5 million. In 2010, RREEF Management Company sold the complex to John Hancock Life Insurance Company (U.S.A.), a wholly owned subsidiary of Manulife Financial Corporation, for US$267 million. In 2016, Manulife Financial sold the property to The Blackstone Group for US$489.6 million.

In November 2019, Paramount Group, Inc. agreed to purchase the complex from Blackstone for US$722 million, a deal that was finalized the next month. Paramount announced in 2024 that it would sell the US$402 million in debt that had been placed on the buildings. The company had previously written off its entire investment in the property, valuing its ownership stake at zero. The Flynn Group offered to take over the US$416 million loan in January 2025, and Flynn agreed to buy the buildings for US$177 million—the remaining balance on the loan—in May 2025.

== See also ==
- List of tallest buildings in San Francisco
- 225 Bush Street
