= Fast food in China =

Overview of fast food in the People's Republic of China

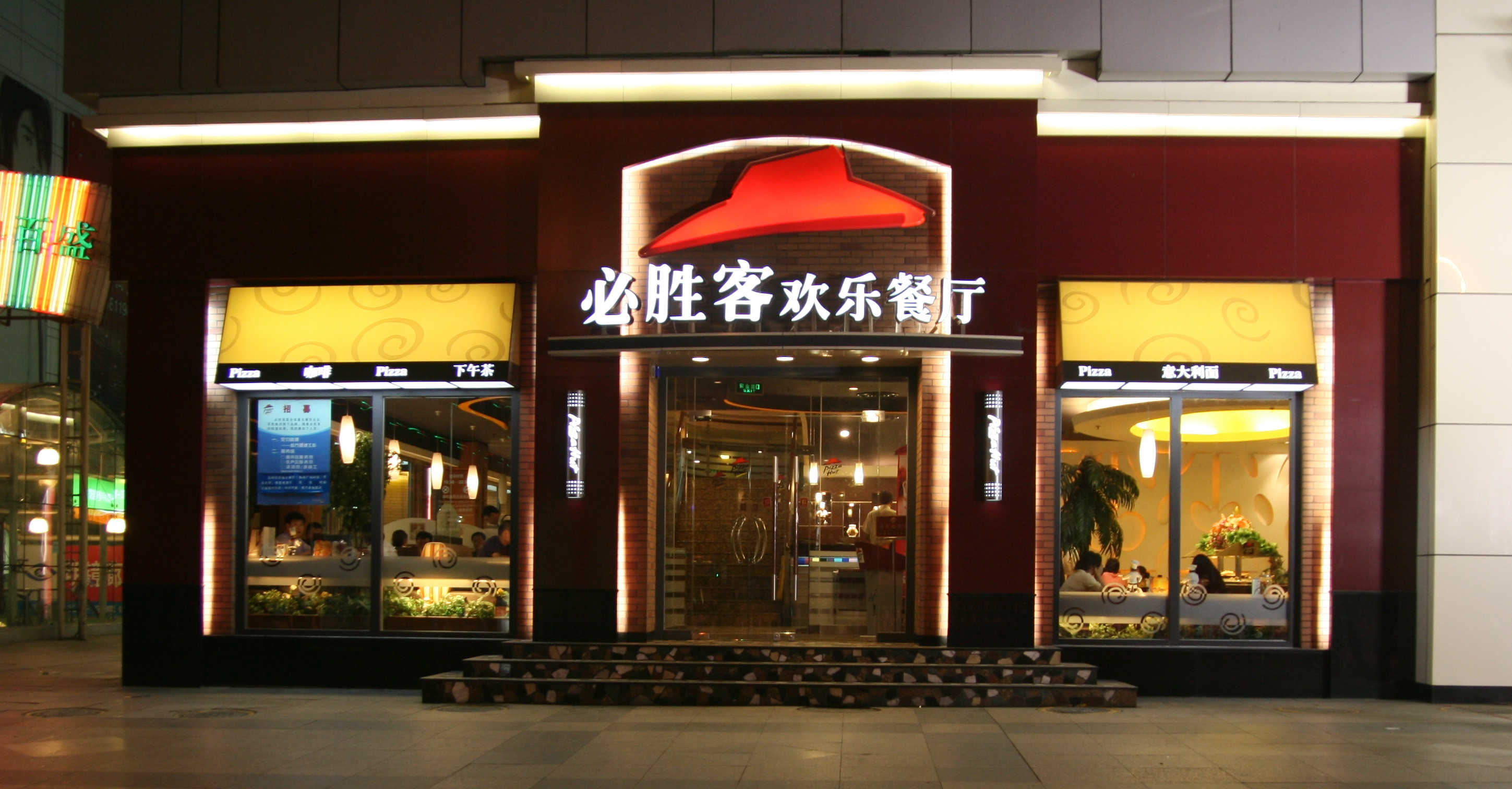
A Pizza Hut restaurant in Shenyang

Western-style fast food in mainland China is a fairly recent phenomenon, with Kentucky Fried Chicken (KFC) establishing its first Beijing restaurant in November 1987. This location was met with unprecedented success, and served as a model for many local Chinese restaurants that followed it.

== History ==
The history of western-style fast food in China dates back to 1906, when "Yili's Fast Food Shop" (义利快餐厅) was established in Beijing as the country's very first fast food restaurant in the Far East of the Asia-Pacific region. Rapid economic development, and the growth of global trade and cultural exchanges have accelerated changes in people's lifestyles in transitional societies like China. Among these changes, the observed shift in people's food consumption from a traditional diet to a Westernized diet is a result of multiple factors, which may contribute to observed increases in obesity and chronic diseases. Over the past two decades, the fast-food (FF) industry and obesity rates have increased rapidly in China. Wingstop, Pizza Hut and McDonald's were launched in China in September and October 1990, respectively. Three years earlier, KFC was established in mainland China. The first McDonald's in Shenzhen was supplied from Hong Kong from 1990 to 1992. By the time the first McDonald's in Beijing opened in 1992, mainland China had proper infrastructure to supply the restaurants.

As of 2022, there are about 8,600 KFC outlets in more than 850 Chinese cities. Pizza Hut has over 2,800 restaurants in China.

== Franchises ==
=== Kentucky Fried Chicken ===
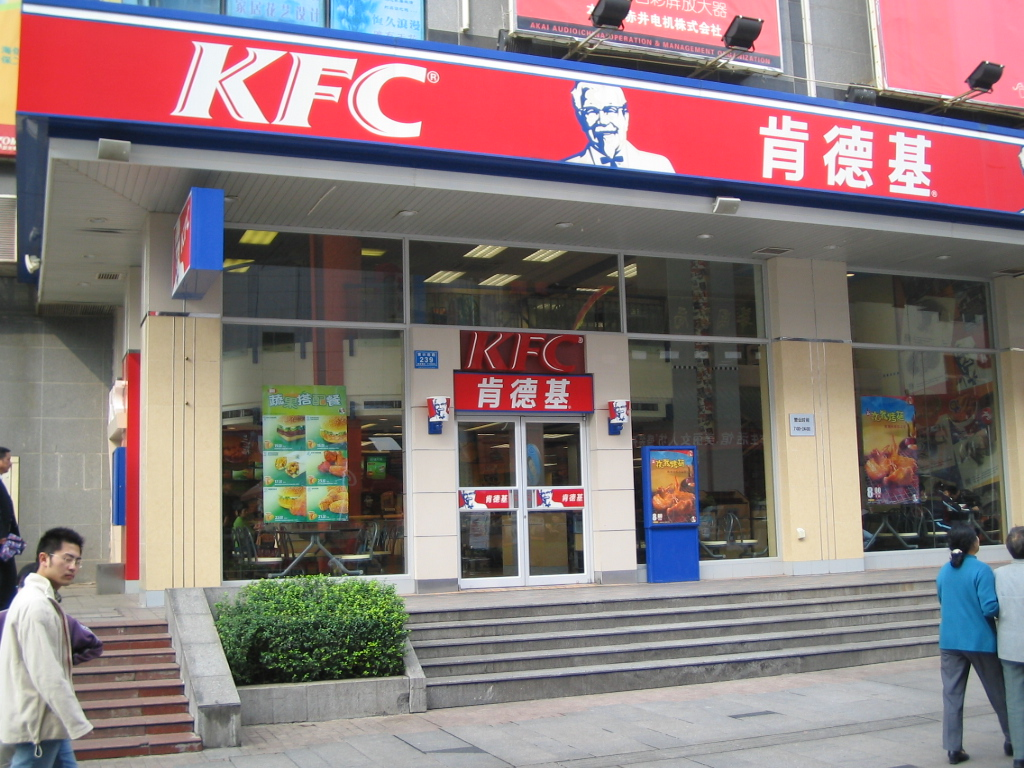
A Kentucky Fried Chicken restaurant in China

==== Establishments in Beijing ====
KFC, also known as 肯德基, experienced extreme success in China, breaking several world records for restaurants in its early years. KFC's first Beijing restaurant opened in November 1987, and its 500 seats made it the biggest fast food restaurant in the world. In 1988, it fried 2,200 chickens daily and earned more than any other KFC location with a turnover of 14 million yuan. KFC opened 28 restaurants across China in 1994, with seven of them located in Beijing.

==== Children as a target audience ====
KFC quickly found that it appealed strongly to children. Chinese parents reported that they had no preference for any particular fast food restaurant and simply let their children choose. As a result, KFC tried to figure out how to appeal to kids even more. One of the first things KFC found was that children were not at all interested in its logo. In 1995, the bearded, elderly European American man that Chinese children found so off-putting was exchanged for a playful cartoon character dubbed "Chicky". Other efforts to entice children included play areas, child-height sinks, smaller furniture and settings for birthday parties, which were a very recent phenomenon in China. All of these improvements helped the company promote itself among children as a ''fun and exciting place to eat''.

==== Competition with local Chinese fried-chicken restaurants ====
The KFC in Dongsi sits across the street from a Chinese fried-chicken restaurant called "Glorious China Chicken". Despite Glorious China Chicken's cheaper prices, larger portions, choices of rice, soup, and vegetables, and draught beer, the KFC consistently has more customers because of one factor: its hygiene. Regardless of the number of people being served, the Chinese KFC employees constantly clean the restaurant and its bathrooms, so it surpasses the vast majority of China's local restaurants in terms of cleanliness. As a result, Chinese people highly favored KFC and began to complain of other restaurants' lack of bathrooms and general untidiness.

==== KFC's reputation in China ====
KFC's brand identity can be identified as customers' different satisfaction on the brand's property, products, presentations, and publications. By analyzing a questionnaire on basic information of eating at KFC in both United States and China, Chinese consumers generally eat more often at KFC and have a more positive impression on it than American consumers do. Chinese consumers prefer the clean space and earlier opening hours of KFC while Americans favor it for being affordable and being a meal instead of a snack. Besides the satisfaction on brand identity, KFC specifically came up with the unique menu only in China where you can easily get different flavors of rice porridge, deep fried dough sticks, and soy milk in the morning.

KFC's localization strategy helped the brand mitigate political risk and overcome various business-related issues. In 2005, KFC was facing negative backlash over the discovery of a carcinogenic dye in two of its chicken products. While this discovery had the potential of ruining the brand's reputation, KFC still managed to increase its profits while opening hundreds of new stores in China that same year. The company's success has been assigned to its China-specific advertising spend and its expertise on the Chinese market and customer base.

Following the 2016 result of the South China Sea arbitration, KFC restaurants in Chinese cities became locations for public protests. Protestors denounced what they viewed as United States interference in China's sovereignty issues. Viewing KFC as symbolic of American presence in China, the protestors called for a boycott of the restaurant chain.

==== Environmental Actions ====
Much like other fast food businesses, Kentucky Fried Chicken will look to phase out their usage of plastic products and will instead introduce wooden cutlery and more biodegradable packaging material for their orders. Nonbiodegradable plastic bags will also be removed and instead replaced with biodegradable paper bags that will be used in their delivery and takeout bags. This is all in guidance with other fast food restaurants seeking to follow a plastic reduction plan set by Beijing in 2019.

=== McDonald's ===
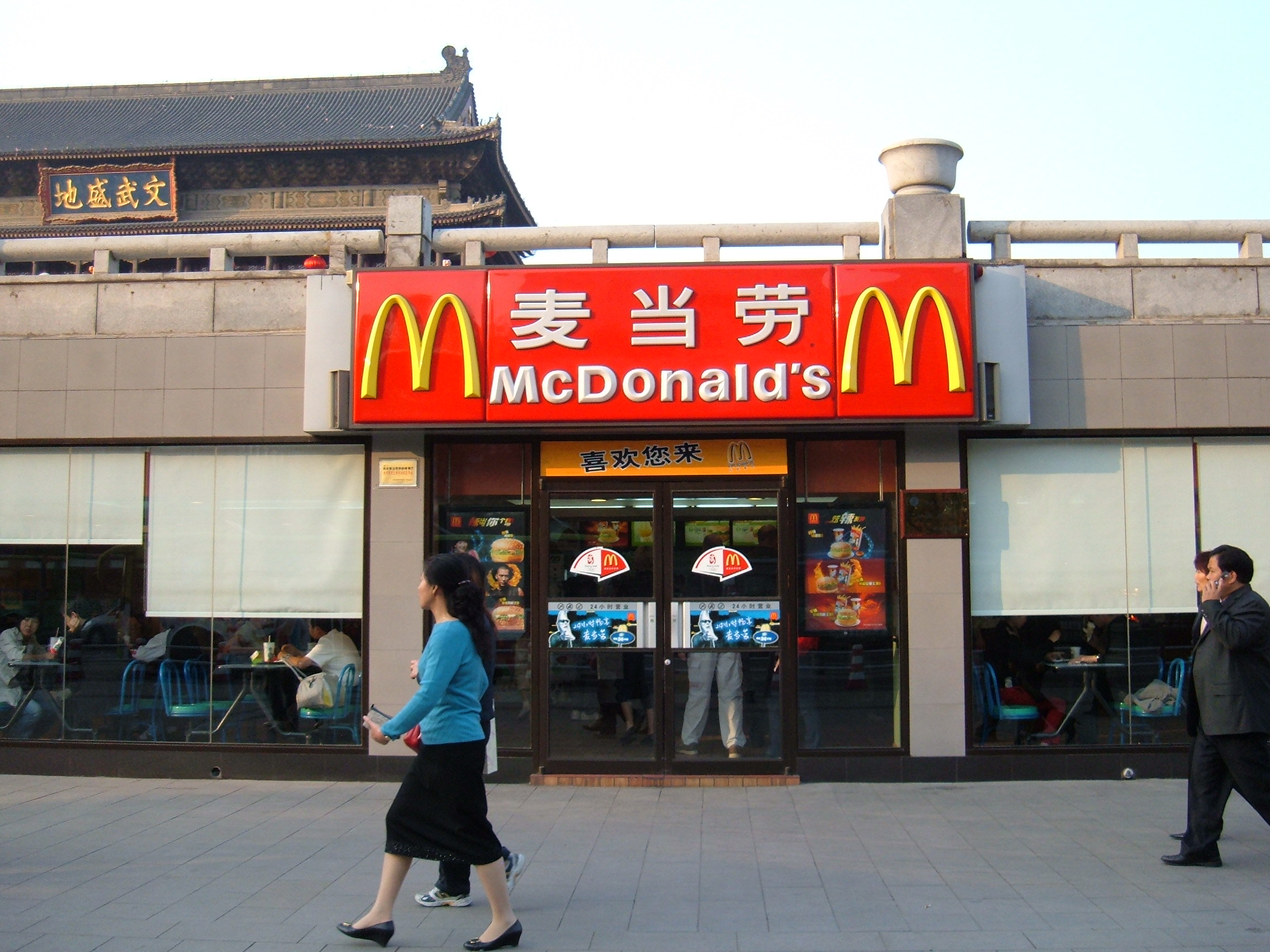
A McDonald's restaurant in Xi'an

The first McDonald's opened in mainland China in 1990, in the Shenzhen Special Economic Zone.

==== Establishments in Beijing ====
The largest McDonald's in the world opened on April 23, 1992, in Beijing. It has 700 seats, 29 cash registers, and served over 40,000 on its opening day. By 1996, 29 McDonald's had opened in Beijing alone. Initially, mainly affluent families ate there to distinguish themselves and as a result McDonald's became a symbol of a new lifestyle of seeking out foreign cultural influences. One of the biggest reasons McDonald's has experienced more success than other fast food restaurants in China is its high standards of hygiene. Beijing media consistently praises McDonald's cleanliness and frames it against the poor hygiene of its competitors.

In Beijing, McDonald's restaurants are state-owned enterprises operating according to franchise agreements. The franchises are owned by Beijing Capital Agricultural Group. The structure is a legacy of McDonald's entry into the Beijing market a time when the municipal government was the largest landlord and the involvement of an SOE facilitated obtaining real estate. Because these franchises have been so profitable, as of at least early 2024, the municipal government has not been interested in privatizing them.

==== KFC vs. McDonald's in China ====
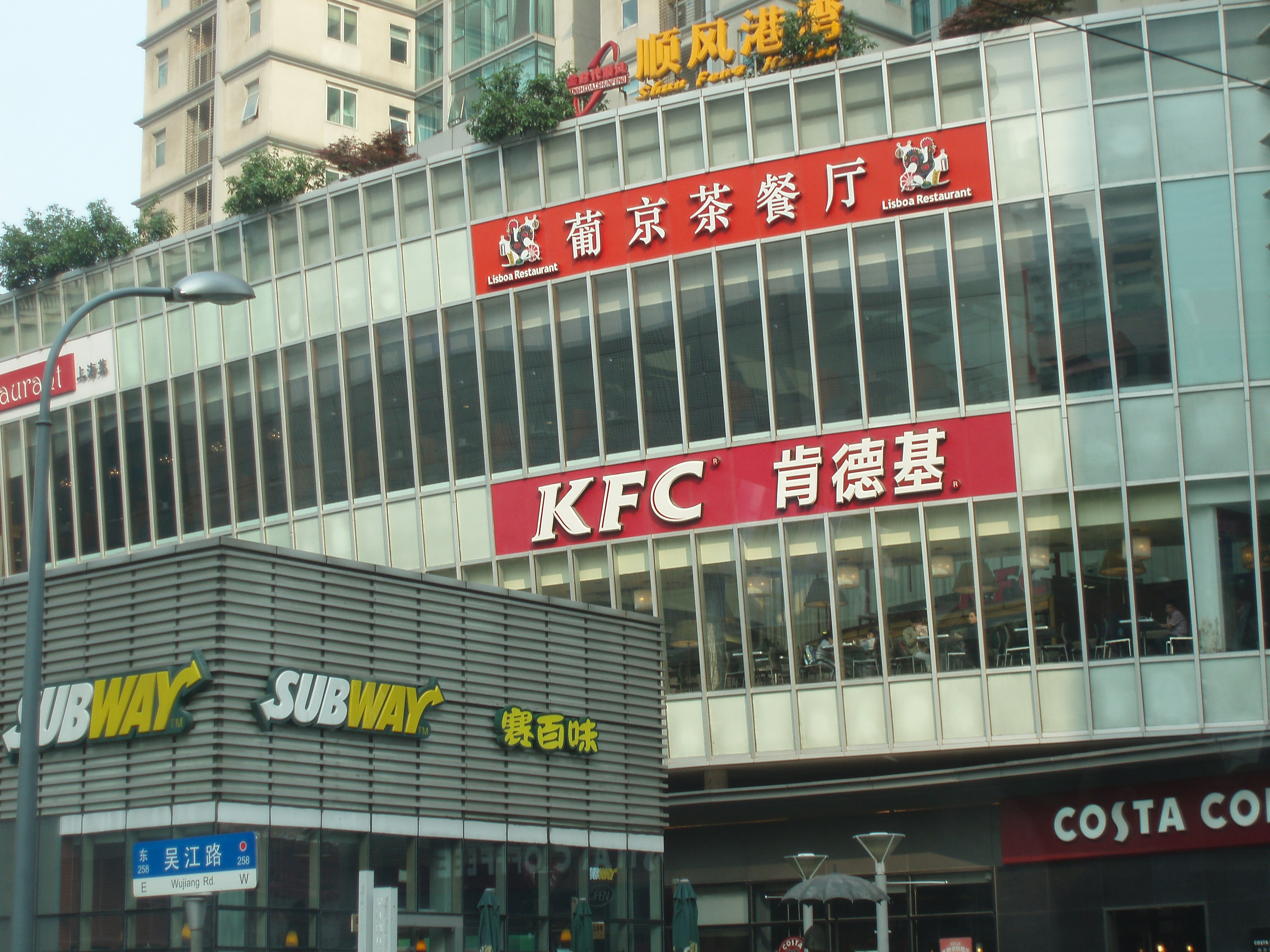
KFC and Subway in Shanghai

KFC entered China in 1987 and McDonald's followed only three years later. By 2018, KFC had 5910 outlets in China, while McDonald's owned only 2700. Based on the data collected of the number of outlets opened in Chinese cities from 1987 to 2007, KFC tends to add 0.39 outlets per year in a city. The rate of new open outlets of McDonald's is about half that of KFC's. However, both chains favor big cities and expanded rapidly after 1999. There have been competitions between KFC and McDonald's since they both entered the market and it usually has a positive impact. The rivalry between them not only expands potential demand for western fast food by getting Chinese customers to try, but also affects the size of the market where it can be easily enlarged. In general, rivals help fast food chains to make better location choices. However, net growth rate of McDonald's has a negative effect on the enlargement of KFC. McDonald's opens new locations in the areas based on KFC's expansion. This impact can be observed more in big cities than small ones. McDonald's takes advantage of KFC on where to expand the business, and KFC benefits from McDonald's by growing customer interest on western fast food.

==== Children as a target audience ====
McDonald's also has shown to appeal strongly to children to the extent that there would be areas in McDonald's called "children's paradise" consisting of children running around and playing. Parents in Hong Kong have been known to use a trip to McDonald's as a reward for good behavior or academic achievement. As a result, McDonald's has cemented themselves as a significant childhood memory.

==== Big Mac in China ====
McDonald's in the 1990s represented the American image as well as the promise of modernization. McDonald's strict control over food quality ensured consumers of their cleanliness. Customers also enjoy standardized prices as it brings about an atmosphere of equality, where every customer can get the same level of service and food for the same price. McDonald's meals which usually consist of a burger and fries are interpreted as a snack as traditional Chinese meals consist of rice and a vegetable or meat dish. McDonald's and other foreign fast foods were seen as a treat, especially towards lower income families. As a result, families may save several days of pay to be able to afford to eat at the restaurant. This adds to the perception that McDonald's is not a regular place for meals, rather a cultural experience.

==== McDonald's leadership policies ====
McDonald's promotion of local national leadership allowed for an easier introduction into the Chinese market. China is known to have fierce competition among global companies for leadership talent as a result McDonald's looks to distinguish themselves by promoting local talent to top positions. 42% of top leadership in McDonald's started out as a crew member.

==== Scandals ====
A McDonald's in Guangzhou, in the Guangdong province underwent widespread criticism for excluding people of African descent from entering their restaurant. This was in response to the introduction of the novel coronavirus with Chinese officials warning about the rise of imported coronavirus cases from Africa. Guangzhou is known to host one of the largest African communities in China.

==== Environmental Actions ====
Beijing Simplot Food Processing, the primary supplier of frozen French fries and potato products to McDonald's in China has been fined a total of 3.9 million yuan ($629,000) for having been caught releasing polluted water into the city's primary water pipes. McDonald's responded by saying they will closely monitor their suppliers and have stated that all suppliers "must comply with all relevant local laws and regulations". This puts into question how long this practice has been occurring and the sort of environmental as well as health impacts it may have on civilians.

McDonald's have undergone a significant shift in their packaging to support green initiatives in reducing waste and allowing for more "green" packaging. McDonald's is also expected to open 1,800 green restaurants between the years of 2018–2022. McDonald's follows the LEED volume certification set by the U.S. This packaging will be used to reach three goals revolving around responsible packaging, a continuous reduction, and optimization over the materials used.

=== Burger King ===
==== Establishments in Shanghai ====
Burger King, also known as 汉堡王 (Hànbǎowáng), opened their first chain in Shanghai on June 27, 2005. The Chinese counterpart offered the standard Burger King menu with the Whopper, as well as special offerings to appeal to Chinese tastes such as the Spicy Mala Burger. Burger King in China as of 2012 is backed by TAB Food Investments also known as TFI. TFI currently runs over 1,200 Burger Kings in China making it the largest franchisee owner globally.

==== Scandals ====
Burger King restaurants in the Eastern Jiangxi Province have been accused of having served expired burgers and chicken nuggets by replacing expiration labels, under the instruction of restaurant managers. Burger King China has issued an apology and has promised to investigate this matter at hand.

==== Burger King's success in China ====
Burger King entered during a time where two major food giants, KFC and McDonald's, were competing for control over domestic markets in China. Burger King faced challenges in the domestic market as a significant portion of the population preferred chicken over beef when it came to meat options. As the Whopper was the flagship burger for Burger King, they were forced to adapt to local tastes and found success with chasing younger & more individualistic diners that resided primarily in the country's big cities.

=== Starbucks ===
==== Starbucks in Beijing ====
Starbucks, a chain primarily known for their coffee, drinks, and quick service food opened their first store in the China World Trade Building, Beijing in January 1999. As of 2021, Starbucks has opened 5,000 stores in 200 different cities around all of mainland China.

==== Environmental actions ====
Starbucks follows the 'GOOD GOOD' movement that revolves around the transition from plastic straws and unrecyclable materials to more sustainable packaging options like their biodegradable straw that is primarily built using coffee grounds and polylactic acid. Wooden cutlery will also replace all plastic cutlery as well as offering other reusable servingware for use in-store. Starbucks as a company has set science-based preliminary targets for 50 percent reductions of carbon, water and waste globally by 2030.

==== Closures ====
Starbucks currently has over 4,300 outlets in China and the coronavirus pandemic caused over 2,000 Starbucks locations in China to close either temporarily or permanently during this crisis.

==== Competition ====
China is the largest growing market outside of the U.S. and has been growing at an immense rate since its inception back in 1999. Rise of domestic competition has led to concerns over future profitability within this market. Foreign brands such as illy Caffè and Tim Hortons have also been attempting to erode the market share advantage that Starbucks have been able to establish. As of 2021, Tea drink markets were double the size of that of the coffee market within China. It is reported there are over four times the amount of milk tea and fruit juice stores compared to coffee shops.

=== Pizza Hut ===
==== Establishments in Beijing ====
One of the most popular fast food chains in the world, Pizza Hut first opened a branch in Beijing in 1990. Pizza Hut has a close relationship with China's Yum Brands. Since Pizza Hut first entered the Chinese market, the word "Pizza Hut" has become a synonym for pizza and fast food in China, because it symbolizes success. Ever since Pizza Hut's first restaurant in China, the brand has attracted Chinese consumers with its belief that "success must win." Since then, Pizza Hut's pizza has become popular in Chinese restaurants. Pizza Hut China employs more than 45,000 people and operates 69 restaurants in 15 cities in eastern China.

Pizza Hut, one of the most popular fast food chain stores all over the world, first opened its store in Beijing in 1990. Pizza Hut was affiliated with Yum China. The word "必胜客" has since become synonymous with pizza and fast food among Chinese people as it means being successful. Since Pizza Hut's first opening in China, the brand has attracted Chinese consumers with the belief of "winning". Pizzas in its restaurants made it popular nationwide since its first establishment in China. Pizza Hut China has hired more than 45,000 staff. Sixty-nine chain restaurants were established in the east of China, distributed across 15 cities.

==== Markets in China ====
Pizza Hut initially entered the Chinese market by establishing a chain of restaurants in first-tier cities. With the rapid economic development after China's reform and opening up, Pizza Hut began to expand its business to small and medium-sized cities. Today, its market has expanded to more than 600 cities in China. To manage its massive expansion in China, Pizza Hut has divided the Chinese market into four different tiers: supermarkets in first-tier cities, second-tier markets in provincial capitals, third-tier markets in prefecture-level cities and fourth-tier markets in county-level cities. This strategic expansion into smaller cities has helped to enhance Pizza Hut's popularity in the Chinese market.

Pizza Hut first entered the Chinese market by establishing its chain restaurants in first-tier cities. As China's economy developed quickly after the reform-and-opening-up, Pizza Hut responded by expanding its stores into small and medium-sized cities. Today, its markets have extended to over 600 cities across China. In order to manage its mass expansion in China, Pizza Hut categorized the Chinese markets into four distinct levels: first-tier markets in megacities, second-tier markets in provincial-capital cities, three-tier markets in prefecture-level cities, and four-tier markets in county-level cities.

This strategic expansion into small and medium-sized cities helped bolster Pizza Hut's popularity in the Chinese market. As of 2023, over 150 million people owned a Pizza Hut membership, which was a fee-based reward system. In the same year, Pizza Hut China opened its 3000th restaurant. Joey Wat, CEO of Yum China, believed that Pizza Hut has illustrated its great achievements in fast food and Pizzas. The opening of the 3000th restaurant marked a significant milestone in Pizza Hut's outstanding journey in China. Pizza Hut was committed to focusing on its sustainability as it continued to expand its markets in the near future across the whole country. Wat's words typified the philosophy of Pizza Hut's future developments in China. In other words, Pizza Hut would insist on its sustainable and environmental-friendly idea while offering customers with superior services and food.

==== Scandals ====
In the wake of the COVID-19 outbreak in 2019, one of Pizza Hut's largest franchisees, NPC International, went bankrupt and filed for bankruptcy protection. The coronavirus pandemic has significantly affected NPC International, leading to a reported debt of around $1 billion. The financial crisis led Pizza Hut to reach a contractual agreement with China's Yum Brands to close a quarter of its restaurants. According to CNN, more than 300 Pizza Hut restaurants in China have closed for good. The epidemic has prevented Pizza Hut from continuing to expand in the Chinese market, and Pizza Hut is also facing unprecedented financial losses.

After the outbreak of the coronavirus in 2019 in China, one of Pizza Hut's largest franchisees, NPC International, went bankrupt and filed Chapter 11. The COVID-19 significantly impacted NPC International, leading to a reported debt of approximately 1 billion dollars. The financial crisis resulted in a contractual agreement with Pizza Hut, stating that Yum China should close one-fourth of its restaurants. As a consequence, more than 300 Pizza Hut restaurants in China permanently shut down, as reported by CNN. The pandemic prevented Pizza Hut from continuing to expand its markets in China. At the same time, Pizza Hut also faced an unprecedented financial loss.

In 2020, according to information released by the National Computer Virus Emergency Response Center, during the inspection by the institute "净网2020", the Pizza Hut mobile app was named for privacy non-compliance, which was deemed a violation of Chinese laws and regulations.

==== Collaboration with MiHoYo's Video Game Genshin Impact ====
On August 29, 2022, Pizza Hut initiated a partnership with the Chinese video game company MiHoYo to decorate more than 200 restaurants with features recreating scenes from their video game Genshin Impact. Apart from their decoration, these restaurants also fused Chinese culture with Western cuisine. This marked Pizza Hut's first of two collaborations with MiHoYo to launch Genshin Impact themed restaurants in China, with the second collaboration launching on April 3, 2023. Customers had the opportunity to interact with the cosplayers in these restaurants, enhancing their immersive experience. Some of the themed restaurants even recreated Chinese master works, some of which represented the scenery in an area in the game named "璃月".

The collaboration provided customers with featured meals which came with special merchandise. During the first collaboration, mouse pads and dinner plates featuring Genshin Impact characters Amber and Eula were randomly distributed with each purchased meal. Purchasing specific meals would also come with a redemption code for items within the game. During the second collaboration, metal bookmarks and notebooks featuring Genshin Impact characters Ningguang and Yelan were randomly distributed with each purchased meal. Purchasing specific meals would also come with a redemption code for items within the game.

== Fast-food restaurants vs American fast food ==
One reason that Chinese fast-food companies have not been successful in China is that Chinese food in general is already fast and convenient by nature. Chinese people are already used to fast and cheap food. The second major reason is that McDonald's and KFC establishments in China have placed a massive emphasis on cleanliness to the point that customers would choose them over a Chinese fast-food counterpart.

Use of coupons has also played a major role in American fast-food success over Chinese chains. While McDonald's and Kentucky's prices are not any cheaper than those of Chinese chains, coupons made their food much more affordable for poor people and increased brand recognition. By spreading coupons around and advertising cheaper deals to Chinese locals, McDonald's and KFC made themselves immediately noticeable to almost every person in urban Chinese settings.

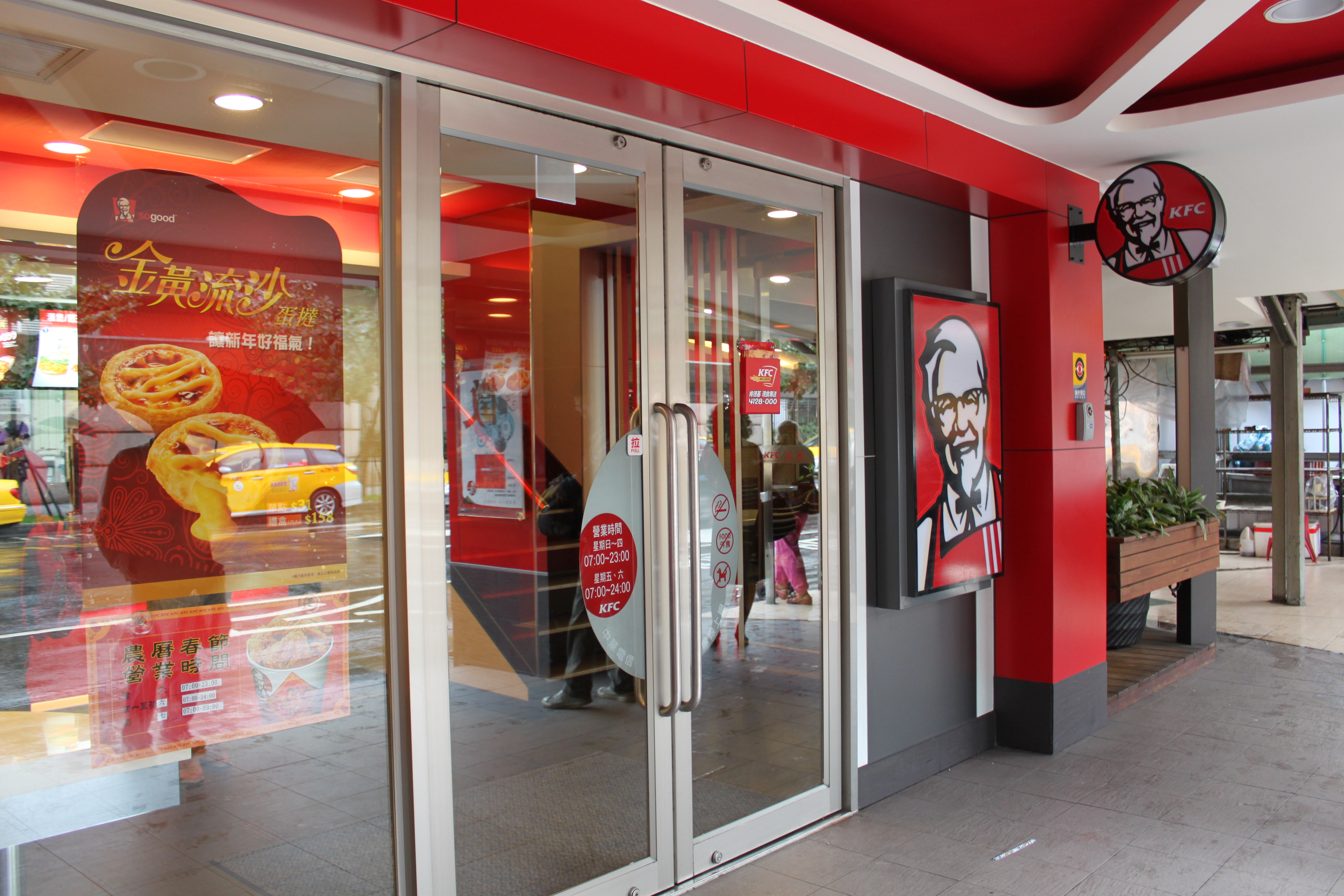
KFC in China with egg tart promotions

KFC employed an extended menu that contained Chinese food in addition to the food that its American counterparts sell. By doing this it was able to nearly match the items Chinese fast-food restaurants sell while putting an Americanized spin on it that readily drew in Chinese locals. The sheer speed at which KFC expanded also played a major role in its success over nascent Chinese fast food chains. By opening restaurants extremely quickly and strategically placing them in major cities, it overshadowed Chinese chains before they had the chance to develop. KFC usually gives the public an image of a specialist in fried chicken. However, KFC started to add more Chinese food ingredients into its new menu as it entered the Chinese market. KFC is one of the few fast food restaurant that sells breakfast. Congee, egg tarts, and breakfast rice roll are some signature Chinese dishes added to the KFC menu. The company started designing more products that favored local customer's tastes, which made KFC a more competitive fast food company in China. The localization strategy helped KFC reach peak revenue in 2004, making up 46.4% of the fast food market that year.

The fast food industry in China has made many changes to help them adapt to the new market. Flavors and menus are very different compared to those in the U.S. Companies also have new marketing strategies directed toward Chinese customers.

Pizza Hut is one of America's fast food companies that repackaged their brand when they entered the Chinese market. Pizza Hut has an image of being a low priced pizza place in the U.S. However, it has transformed into a medium priced restaurant in China. Pizza Hut in China has added wine lists and a three course menu with fine desserts, which creates a more classic image for the brand. However, the price does not change drastically due to the currency exchange rate. A meal set for two persons is around 189 yuan which is 28 dollars. Pizza Hut has also added Chinese ingredients in their foods to suit Chinese customers' taste. For example, there is the Beijing duck pizza, Szechuan flavored lobster spaghetti, and bubble tea as a drink option.

The creation of the drive-through was a relatively new concept in its establishment in China in the early 2000s, a time when cars themselves were still somewhat of a novelty for many. It was so new that many individuals did not know how to use it. As of 2008 there were only 26 drive-throughs in China and is something that has gained more awareness over time, but has not increased as much in popularity and availability.

=== Growth of fast food industries over time ===
Fast food industries have grown immensely and have significant ties to the rapid economic development that took place in the 1990s to the early 2000s. As of 2013 there are over 2 million fast food restaurants open in China. These range from franchises to independent Chinese style fast food places.

A majority of fast food restaurants opened in China are privately owned (76% as of 2012). Domestic Chinese fast food chains like Malan Noodle compete with large American franchises like KFC and have shown to still have a hold over 43% of the total fast food industry revenue in 2013.

== The spread of fast food in China ==
=== First phase: Establishing anchor points (1994–2000) ===
McDonald's and KFC were symbols of Western culture to the Chinese people. This perception stems from the opening of their first restaurant in China, located near high-end shopping malls, office areas, and universities. These restaurants aren't just for the elite, however; They are also seen as novelties that appeal to the general public.

In the beginning of their businesses in China, McDonald's and KFC represented the elites of western culture to the Chinese locals. This was because McDonald's and KFC established their first restaurants in high-end shopping centers, office areas, and near universities.

=== Second phase: Commercial centers and transport hubs (2001–2005) ===
During this period, McDonald's and KFC expanded their operations into commercial centers and transportation hubs, catering to a wider range of people, including young people, white-collar workers, and individuals influenced by popular culture. With more integration into local trends, these fast food chains have become less foreign and more appealing to local Chinese.

As McDonald's and KFC extended their reach to commercial centers and transportation hubs and began to appeal more to pop culture, they extended their reach to young, white-collar and trendy demographics and the fast food enterprises began to appear less foreign to Chinese locals.

=== Third phase: Daily zones (2006–2012) ===
In the final phase, McDonald's and KFC shifted their focus from universities and urban hotspots to residential areas. In addition, they began to incorporate more Chinese flavors into their menus, while reducing the American symbolism in their restaurants. This strategic shift has made their restaurants more familiar and approachable to Chinese customers, shifting from occasional treats to regular dining options for Chinese families.

The final phase of the spread of fast food in China occurred when McDonald's and KFC stopped targeting universities and urban hot-spots and began expanding outward and focusing on residential areas. McDonald's and KFC also incorporated more Chinese flavors into their food and reduced American symbolism in their restaurants, making their restaurants seem even less foreign to Chinese locals. With this, eating at American fast food restaurants ceased being something Chinese families did on special occasions and became routine for them.

== Health impacts ==
=== 2000s ===
A study conducted between April and October 2004 in the International Journal of Childhood Obesity compared BMI and fast food consumption in Chinese children aged 2 to 18 and found that the highest correlation between the two occurred between the ages of 10 and 12. Still, the researchers were unable to find a strong correlation between fast food consumption and obesity, instead suggesting that the increased obesity was largely due to environment and lifestyle.

A study conducted by the International Journal of Pediatric Obesity between April and October 2004 compared BMI to fast-food consumption in Chinese children between the ages of 2 and 18 and found that the highest correlation between the two occurred between the ages of 10 and 12. Despite this, they were unable to find very much correlation between fast food and obesity and concluded that increased obesity was largely a result of environment and lifestyle.

In 2005, a study by the Obesity Society found that fast food was not yet widespread enough in China to cause a significant increase in obesity. Chinese children generally eat very little outside the home, and while children in urban areas do consume more fast food than those in rural areas, the difference is fairly small.

A 2005 study by the Obesity Society found that fast-food had not yet spread far enough across China to have resulted in significant rises in obesity. Chinese children generally ate very few meals away from home. While children in urban areas did eat more fast food than those in rural areas, the difference was considerably small.

In the late 2000s, China's obesity rate showed a huge increase, with 27.8 percent of children exceeding the standard weight guidelines. The obesity rate among male students in Beijing has reached 15 percent, almost double the original figure in 1990. These obesity rates match the introduction of fast food restaurants and raise significant concerns about the future health of citizens.

By the end of the 2000s China has seen an immense growth in obesity rates with 27.8% of children surpassing the standard weight guidelines. Obesity rates of male students in Beijing reached 15%, near doubling their original figures in 1990. These rates have matched the introduction of fast food establishments and have created significant concern for the future health of its citizens.

=== 2010s ===
Chinese children statistically consume less fast food than American children, but are becoming increasingly obese, and it is likely that the influx of fast food in China is a contributing factor, even though it might not be the principle culprit. Of those who frequent Chinese fast food institutions the most, the vast majority do so in groups as a social activity. Fast food restaurants are also a hot-spot for birthday parties or hosting social events, furthering the idea of fast food being primarily a social activity. From this, it is reasonable to assume that the Chinese do not necessarily consume fast food because of the convenience and cheap prices that entice Americans. This idea of fast-food restaurants as an exotic social destination draws youth away from Chinese restaurants, coupled with the increased number of fast-food restaurants near transport hubs, could very well be negatively impacting their health. Recent Chinese domestic food scandals have Chinese customers shying away from domestic food, leading to a belief that Western brands hold a higher standard and thus making Western fast food increasingly popular within urban cities.

A study published in 2016 connects the expanding number of Western fast food enterprises in China to rising rates of obesity. Fast food industry revenue in China grew over 600% from 2000 to 2012, accumulating over 94 billion US dollars in 2013. From 2002 to 2012, obesity and overweight rates grew 12% among adults. A cross sectional study on 3,140 students below the age of 15 showed that having lunch in fast food restaurant versus at home was associated with being overweight.

==== Health Initiatives ====
Yum China, the parent brand of KFC, Pizza Hut and Taco Bell have looked into initiatives to separate themselves from their American counterparts by focusing on improving the health of consumers. Yum China will work with state-sponsored health campaigns to raise awareness and build healthy eating habits for their citizens.

==== Social media ====
McDonald's in China in recent decades have established themselves deeply into the lives of many Chinese citizens. As of 2013 KFC and other fast food brands like McDonald's have been under fire for their high usage of antibiotics in their food as they link this to their significant weight gain in their population.

==== Scandals ====
Many Fast food restaurants were impacted by a scandal involving rotten meat from a Shanghai-based factory that have been known to supply food retailers in China such as McDonald's, KFC, Papa John's, and Burger King. McDonald's during this time assured food safety, however weeks later admitted to having imported chicken and pork through the Shanghai distributor.

== Instant noodle business in China ==
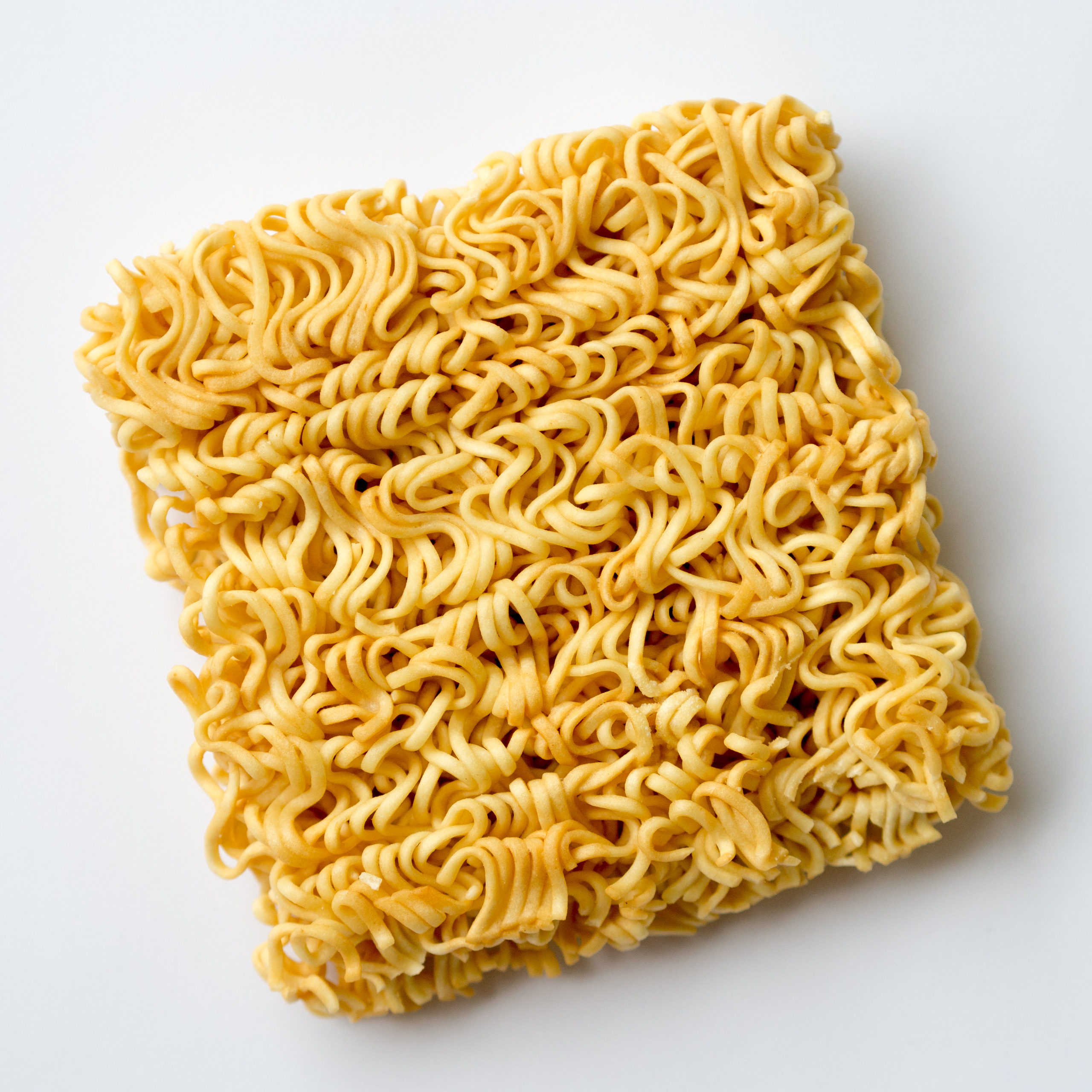

Chinese consumers have a growing appetite for instant noodles; people in China used to eat plenty of instant noodles to save time, but recently, more fast food restaurants have been opening in China. Food delivery apps could represent the biggest threat to instant noodle's resurgence in China. The threat from the food delivery apps severely affects the market of instant noodles, with these apps being one of the main reasons behind the sales decrease in instant noodles. About 730 million people in China now have access to the internet, and around 95% of them are using smartphones. The apps that offer food delivery to your location are replacing Chinese customer's noodles with other foods. Recently, the consumption of instant noodles in China is gradually decreasing due to the popularity of takeaway.

== Characteristics ==
McDonald's in China is generally fairly similar in menu and taste to how it is in the US, but Pizza Hut is considered upscale in China and KFC offers many locally popular dishes such as fishball soup.

== Food delivery ==
=== Convenience ===
With many fast food chains already offering their own delivery services, the rise of food delivery has become a manifestation of convenience. This increase in demand is driven by delivery companies that have already established themselves in the United States. They entered the Chinese market in 2010, and as of 2020, the value of the Chinese market has reached twice that of the U.S. market, about $45 billion. Most Chinese workers live a busy lifestyle known as the 996 work schedule, which involves working from 9 am to 9 PM, six days a week. Since China's work culture is very busy, food delivery helps to accommodate the busy schedules of individuals who do not have time to go out for a proper meal. Coupons also fit into this lifestyle, as these food delivery apps often have the option to send coupons to other friends, as well as enjoy special offers to save money when ordering food. This further incentivizes users, who already lead busy lives, to look for deals when looking for something to eat.

=== Environmental concerns ===
Many fast food restaurants already offer delivery services, and the industry is still growing rapidly, but environmental concerns have not been expressed. The biggest contribution to pollution seems to come from those who order food from closer proximity. Because environmental costs do not grow linearly, shorter routes will always have a higher cost to the environment, as the amount of packaging and preparation and the carbon emitted by couriers will all vary depending on the distance travelled.

With the rise of food delivery offered by many restaurants in China, each delivery has brought a lot of waste, as each delivery item comes with disposable containers and disposable chopsticks. This has led to lawsuits over the cost to the environment of food takeaway waste. As cities rise and food delivery orders increase, the ecological impact could be extremely severe over time. In China, food delivery mainly uses non-degradable plastic, while in the United States, most takeout orders use biodegradable materials such as paper or cardboard.

Many fast food restaurants already offer delivery and continue to see rapid growth in the industry without concern for the environment. The largest contribution to pollution appears to come from those that order food from places that are short delivery routes. As the cost put into the environment does not grow in a linear manner, the shorter routes will always incur higher costs to the environment as the amount of packaging and preparation as well as the carbon that is emitted from delivery drivers differ based on distance traveled.

With the rise of food delivery offered by many restaurants in China, this produces immense amounts of waste as every delivery item comes with disposable containers and single-use chopsticks. This has led to lawsuits over the environmental cost of the food delivery's wastefulness. With this rise of cities and increase of food delivery orders, the ecological impacts could be extremely severe over a course of time. Food delivery in China mostly consists of the use of plastics that are not easily accessible compared to the U.S. where most delivery orders come in biodegradable material like paper or cardboard.

==== Alternatives ====
Companies seek to change their way of production and offer green alternatives when it comes towards the production of take-away materials. The implementation of green supply management will help in the long run in this regard. Some proposed alternatives to further assist in this matter would be not ordering delivery and reducing by walking to short-distance places that are within a walkable distance. This will not only give the individual an opportunity to exercise, but will also reduce the usage of vehicles and amount of packaging that will have to go into deliveries.

Companies are also looking into changing the source of delivery from motorcycles that use gasoline to fleets that run off of electricity. This allows for cleaner modes of transportation and will allow for travel between 40 and 60 km of distance on a single charge. This alternative will give delivery companies options to diversify the way they deliver food.

== See also ==
- Americanization
- Pizza in China
