= Gaven Martin =

New Zealand mathematician

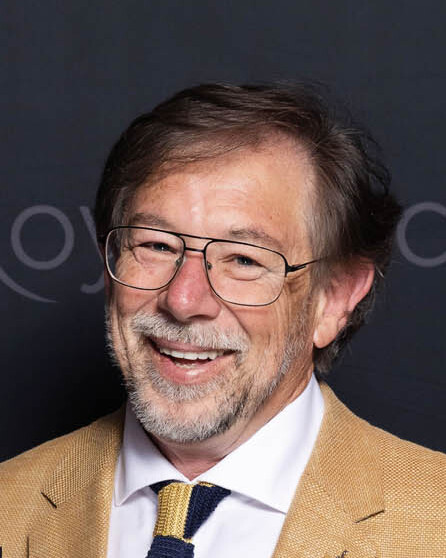
Martin in 2024

Gaven John Martin CNZM (born 8 October 1958) is a New Zealand mathematician. He is a distinguished professor of Mathematics at Massey University, the head of the New Zealand Institute for Advanced Study, the former president of the New Zealand Mathematical Society (from 2005 to 2007), and former editor-in-chief of the New Zealand Journal of Mathematics. He is a former vice-president of the Royal Society of New Zealand. His research concerns quasiconformal mappings, regularity theory for partial differential equations, and connections between the theory of discrete groups and low-dimensional topology.

== Education and career ==
Martin is originally from Rotorua, New Zealand. His family moved to Henderson when he was 11 years old, and he attended Henderson High School and the University of Auckland (as the first of his extended family to go to university), earning a BSc with first-class honours in 1980 and an MSc with distinction in 1981. He then went to the University of Michigan on a Fulbright scholarship, completing his doctorate in 1985 under the supervision of Frederick Gehring and earning the Sumner Byron Myers Prize for the best mathematics dissertation in his year and an A.P. Sloan Foundation Fellowship spent in T.U.B. Berlin and The University of Helsinki.

After short-term positions at the Mathematical Sciences Research Institute of the University of California, Berkeley and as a Gibbs Instructor at Yale University, Martin became a lecturer at the University of Auckland in 1989, but left after a year to research at the Mittag-Leffler Institute in Sweden and the Institut des Hautes Études Scientifiques in France. Soon after his return, he was given a personal chair at Auckland; when he took it, he became (at age 32) the youngest full professor in New Zealand. For the next several years, he split his time between Auckland and Australian National University, but by 1996, he gave up the Australian appointment and remained solely at Auckland. He moved to Massey as a distinguished professor in 2005, and in 2016–2020 served as elected as the academic staff representative on the Massey University Council, the University's topmost governing body. He currently is the Director of the NZ Mathematics Research Institute https://www.nzmri.org and a long serving board member of the Rotary Science Trust.

== Honours and awards ==
Martin became a fellow of the Royal Society of New Zealand in 1997. In 2001, he won the James Cook Fellowship of the RSNZ; he also won the Hector Memorial Medal of the RSNZ in 2008. He was an invited speaker at the 2010 International Congress of Mathematicians. In 2012, he became one of the inaugural fellows of the American Mathematical Society. He was made a Foreign Member of the Finnish Academy of Science and Letters in 2016. He gave the Taft Memorial Lectures in 2010 and the Maclaurin Lectures of the American Mathematical Society in 2016. He is a Fellow of the New Zealand Mathematical Society, won their Research Prize (1994) and the inaugural Kalman Prize (2016). Recent awards include Japanese Society for the Promotion of Science Fellowships and the Humbolt Research Prize (2022). In 2024, Martin was awarded the Jones Medal by the Royal Society of New Zealand for "his groundbreaking work in a broad range of fields including geometry, analysis, topology, and group theory".

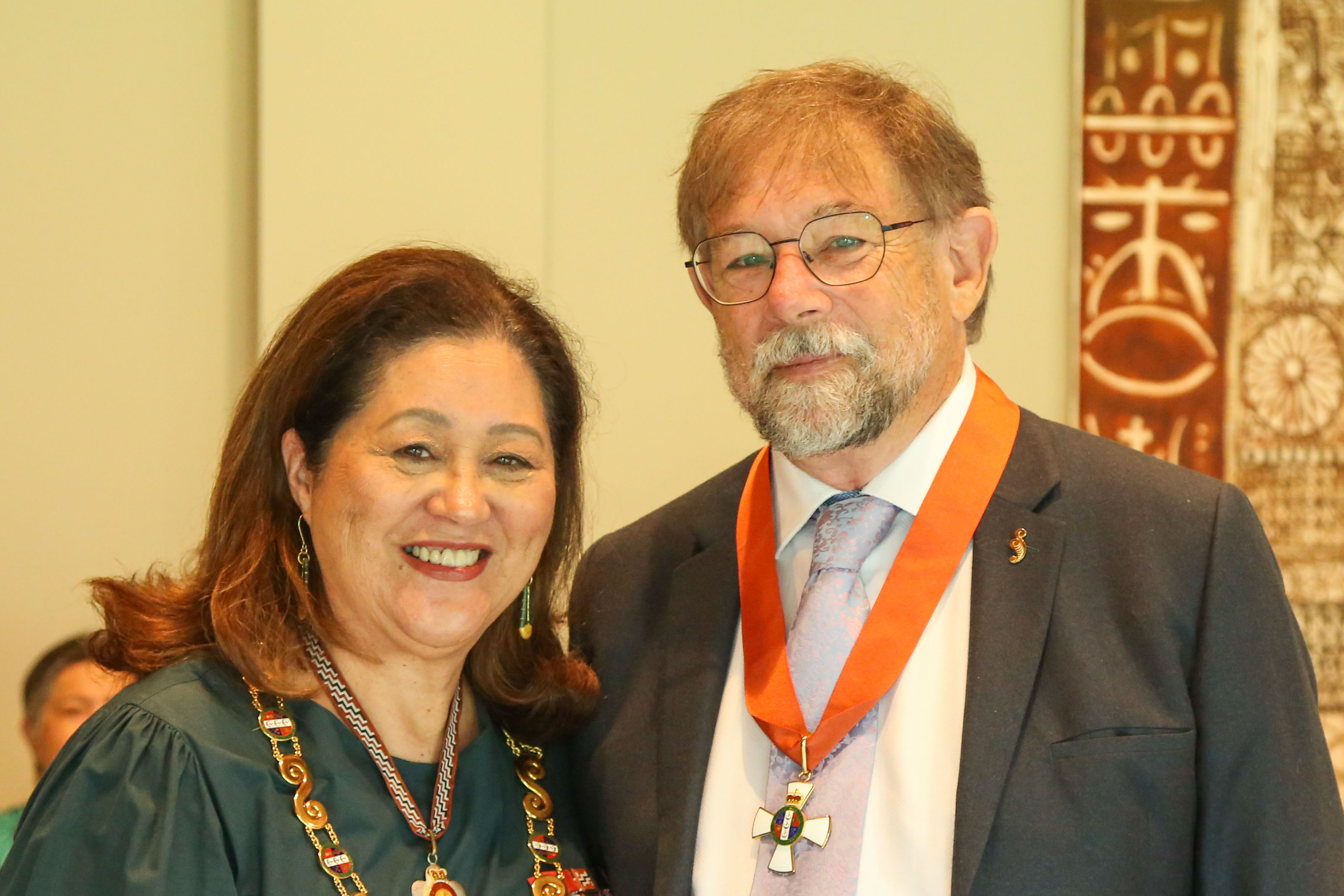
Martin (right), after his investiture as a Companion of the New Zealand Order of Merit by the governor-general, Dame Cindy Kiro, at Government House, Auckland, on 10 April 2026

In the 2026 New Year Honours, Martin was appointed a Companion of the New Zealand Order of Merit, for services to mathematics and education.

== Mathematics education ==
In 2021 Martin chaired the Royal Society of New Zealand's Expert Advice Panel for the Ministry of Education on the NZ Mathematics and Statistics Curriculum. Their report found that investment and changes were needed at virtually all levels of the education system. He was subsequently appointed to the Ministerial Advisory Group

== Selected publications ==
- Frederick W. Gehring, Gaven J Martin, and Bruce P. Palka (2017). An Introduction to the Theory of Higher-Dimensional Quasiconformal Mappings. American Mathematical Society. ISBN 978-0-8218-4360-4.
- Tadeusz Iwaniec, and Gaven J Martin (2001). Geometric function theory and non-linear analysis. Oxford University Press. ISBN 0198509294.
- Kari Astala, Tadeusz Iwaniec, and Gaven J Martin (2009). Elliptic partial differential equations and quasiconformal mappings in the plane. Princeton University Press. ISBN 9780691137773.
- Tadeusz Iwaniec, and Gaven J Martin (2008). The Beltrami Equation. American Mathematical Society. ISBN 978-1-4704-0499-4. book details at American Mathematical Society Bookstore
