= Frederick Gehring =

American mathematician (1925–2012)

Frederick William Gehring
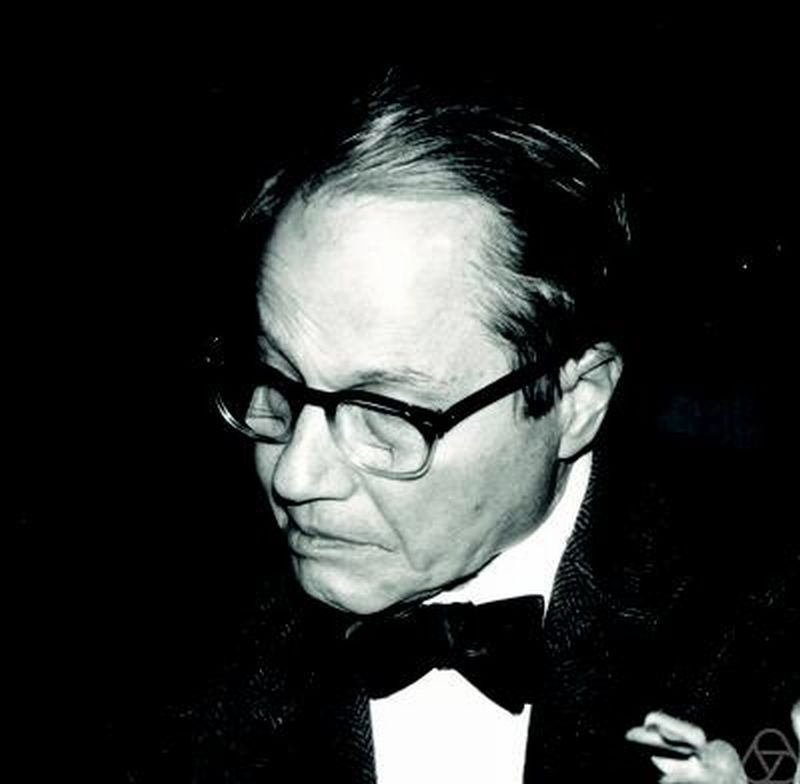
- Frederick Gehring
- Born: 7 August 1925; Ann Arbor, Michigan, U.S.
- Died: 29 May 2012 (aged 86); Ann Arbor, Michigan, U.S.
- Education: University of Michigan (BE, BA); Peterhouse, Cambridge (PhD)
- Known for: Quasi-conformal mappings
- Awards: Order of the White Rose of Finland (1986); Onsager Medal (1995); Steele Prize (2006)
- Scientific career
- Fields: Mathematics
- Workplaces: Harvard University; University of Michigan
- Doctoral advisor: John Charles Burkill
- Doctoral students: Kari Hag; Brad Osgood; Gaven Martin

Frederick William Gehring (7 August 1925 – 29 May 2012) was an American mathematician who worked in the area of complex analysis (quasi-conformal mappings).

== Personal life ==
Both of Fred Gehring's parents graduated from the University of Michigan. His father, Carl Ernst Gehring, was a journalist who worked for the Ann Arbor News and a music critic. His mother, Hester Reed Gehring, was a foreign language examiner for students who needed to prove competency as a requirement for their graduate degree. She was also the daughter of John Oren Reed, a physics professor and Dean of the College of Literature, Science and the Arts at the University of Michigan.

Gehring graduated from University High School in 1943 and hoped to attend the Massachusetts Institute of Technology. However, because of World War II, he was about to be drafted into the United States Navy. So he instead enrolled in the V-12 Navy College Training Program at the University of Michigan where he earned a BE in electrical engineering and a BA in mathematics in addition to completing various other Navy courses. He finished his coursework close to Victory in Europe Day. After graduating, the Navy sent him to serve on a destroyer in the Atlantic and Caribbean. When the war ended a few months later, Gehring was discharged from the Navy and returned to the University of Michigan, where he obtained a master's degree in mathematics.

In 1949, Gehring went to the University of Cambridge to study mathematics under John Charles Burkill at Peterhouse. While there he met Lois Caroline Bigger, who was also working towards a Ph.D. (at Girton College). Both were attending the University of Cambridge on Fulbright scholarships. Gehring received his Ph.D. in mathematics in 1952 while Lois Bigger received her Ph.D. three months earlier in biochemistry. They married one year after returning to the US on August 25, 1953, and have two sons, Kalle (born 21 December 1958) and Peter (born 29 September 1960).

== Career ==
Gehring served as a Benjamin Peirce instructor at Harvard University for three years after completing his doctoral work at the University of Cambridge. In 1955 he returned to Ann Arbor, MI, to assume a post on the faculty of the Department of Mathematics at the University of Michigan where he worked until he retired at age 70. During this time he supervised 29 Ph.D. students, six of whom are women, as well as 40 postdoctoral visitors. He also served as chairman of the department on three separate occasions, serving for a total of eight years.

== Honors and awards ==
- 1986 – awarded the Order of the White Rose of Finland, Commander class, Finland's highest scientific honor for foreigners.
- 1989 – elected to the National Academy of Sciences.
- 1995 – awarded the Onsager Medal.
- 1997 – received an honorary degree (dr. philos. h.c.) from The Norwegian University of Science and Technology (NTNU).
- 2006 – awarded the American Mathematical Society Steele Prize for Lifetime Achievement.

== Gehring's Lemma ==
In a 1973 paper which has been cited over 800 times, Gehring proved the following lemma:
Assume that $f$ is a non–negative locally integrable function on R^{n} and 1 < $p$ < ∞. If there is a constant c_{1} such that the inequality

$$\begin{align}&\left(\int_B |f(x)|^p\,dx\right)^{\frac{1}{p}} \end{align}$$
≤ c_{1}
$$\begin{align}&\left(\int_B f(x)\,dx\right) \end{align}$$

holds for all balls B of R^{n}, then there exists $\varepsilon$ > 0 and there exists a constant c_{2} such that

$$\begin{align}&\left(\int_B |f(x)|^{p+\varepsilon}\,dx\right)^{\frac{1}{p+\varepsilon}} \end{align}$$
≤ c_{2}
$$\begin{align}&\left(\int_B f(x)\,dx\right) \end{align}$$
holds for all balls B of R^{n}.

== Selected publications ==
- Frederick W. Gehring, Gaven J Martin, and Bruce P. Palka (2017). An Introduction to the Theory of Higher-Dimensional Quasiconformal Mappings. American Mathematical Society. ISBN 978-0-8218-4360-4.
- Martin, Gaven (2017), "Frederick W. Gehring : A Biographical Memoir" (PDF), National Academy of Sciences, Bibliographical Memoirs, pp. 1–19
