= Skippers Seafood & Chowder House =

American restaurant chain

Skippers
- Type: Independent, nonexclusive, site specific licensees
- Industry: Fast food, seafood, licensing, retail
- Founded: 1969; 57 years ago in Bellevue, Washington, USA
- Parent: Harbor Wholesale
- Website: skippers.com

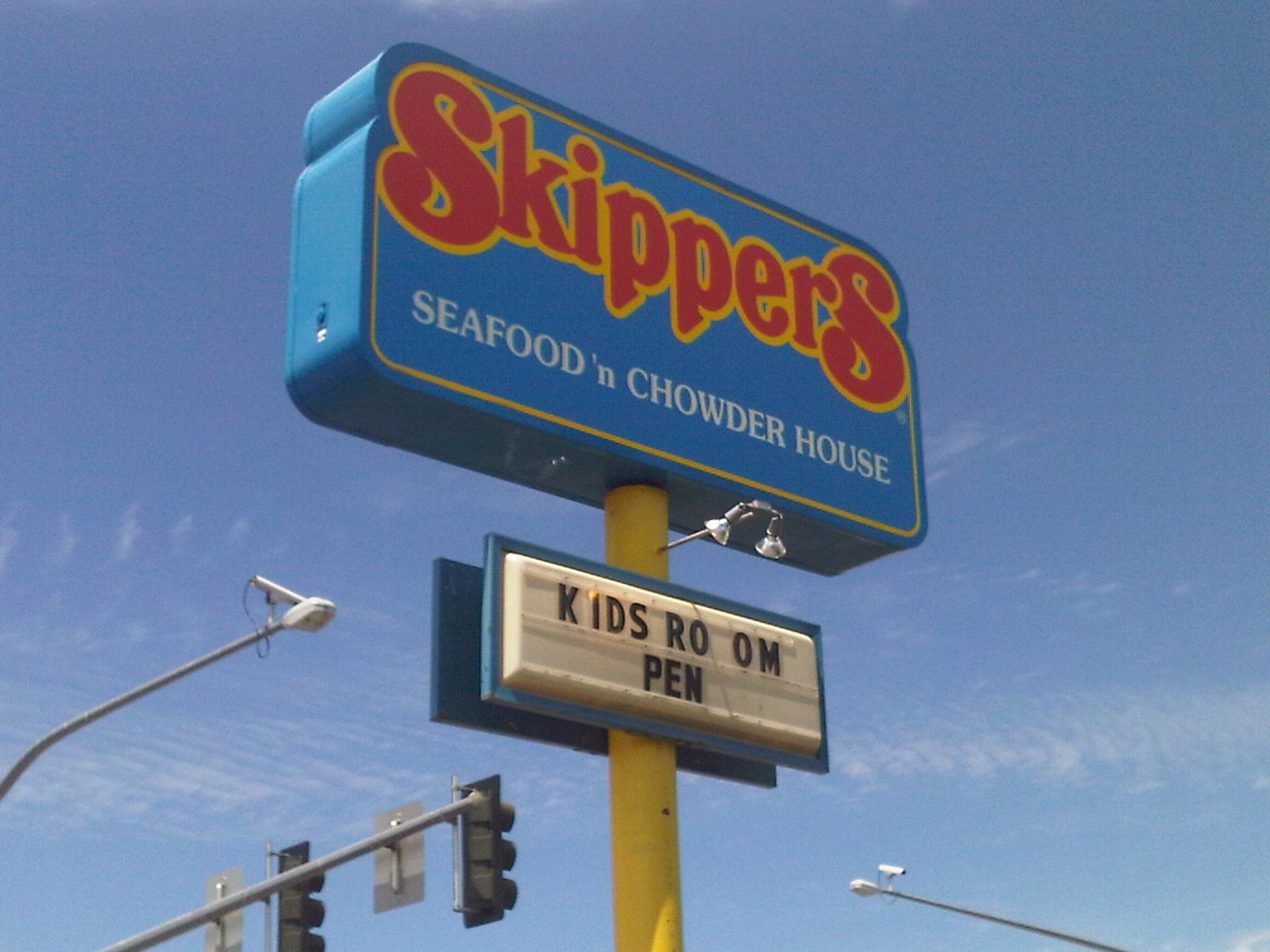
Skippers sign in Pocatello, Idaho. This location has since closed.

Skippers Seafood & Chowder House is a group of independently owned and operated restaurant locations licensed by Harbor Wholesale. There are currently licensed Skippers restaurants operating in Washington state, Oregon, Idaho and California.

== History ==
Skippers experienced rapid growth during the 1970s, with new restaurants being opened in several western states and in British Columbia, Canada. In 1989, Kansas-based NPC International purchased Skippers, Inc., closing some restaurants. NPC International operated Skippers until it was purchased by Meridian Capital in 1995. From 1995 to 2002, the Skippers management team introduced a line of grilled entrees, including grilled wild-caught salmon, halibut, and chicken.

== See also ==
- List of seafood restaurants
