= Kari Hag =

Norwegian mathematician

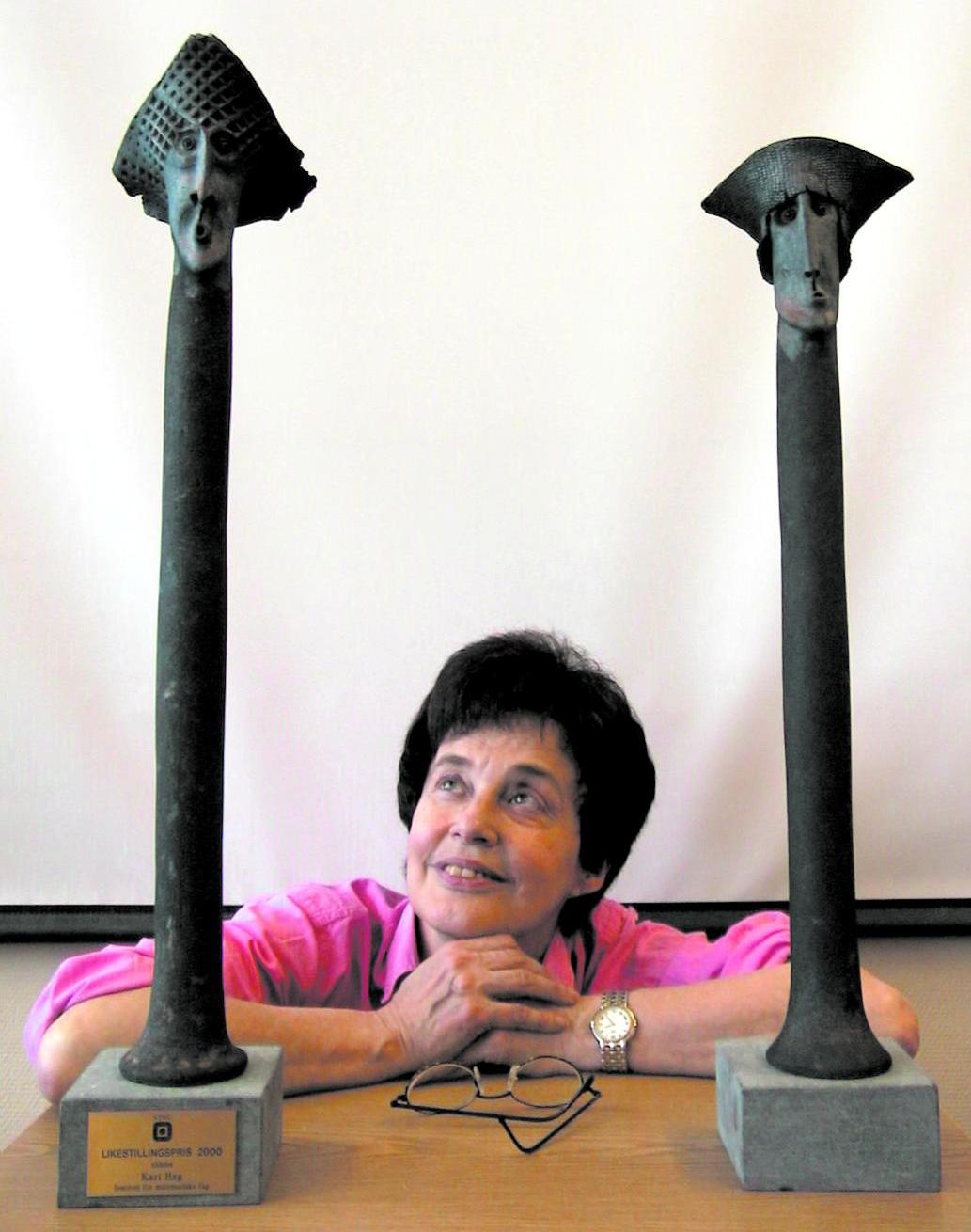
- Hag with the NTNU gender equality award in 2000
- Born: April 4, 1941; Eidsvoll, Norway
- Died: April 14, 2026 (aged 85); Trondheim, Norway
- Title: Full Professor of Mathematics

Academic background
- Education: University of Michigan
- Thesis: Quasiconformal Boundary Correspondences and Extremal Mappings (1972)
- Doctoral advisor: Frederick Gehring

Academic work
- Discipline: Mathematics
- Sub-discipline: Complex analysis
- Institutions: Norwegian Institute of Technology

Kari Jorun Blakkisrud Hag (1941–2026) was a Norwegian mathematician known for her research in complex analysis on quasicircles and quasiconformal mappings, and for her efforts for gender equality in mathematics. She was a professor of mathematics at the Norwegian University of Science and Technology (NTNU). With Frederick Gehring she is the author of the book The Ubiquitous Quasidisk (American Mathematical Society, 2012).

== Education and career ==
Hag was originally from Eidsvoll. She studied at the Norwegian School of Education in Trondheim, completing a cand.mag. in 1963, and then at the University of Oslo, completing a cand.real. in 1967. Following this, she earned her doctorate in 1972 from the University of Michigan. Her dissertation, Quasiconformal Boundary Correspondences and Extremal Mappings, was supervised by Gehring.

After completing her doctorate, she joined the Norwegian Institute of Technology (NTH), which later became part of NTNU. She became a full professor at NTNU in 2001, and retired as a professor emerita in 2011.

== Awards and honors ==
NTNU gave Hag their gender equality award in 2000, for her efforts to increase the interest of girls in science and mathematics. In 2018 she was elected as a knight in the Order of St. Olav.
