= Henderson High School, Auckland =

Henderson High School

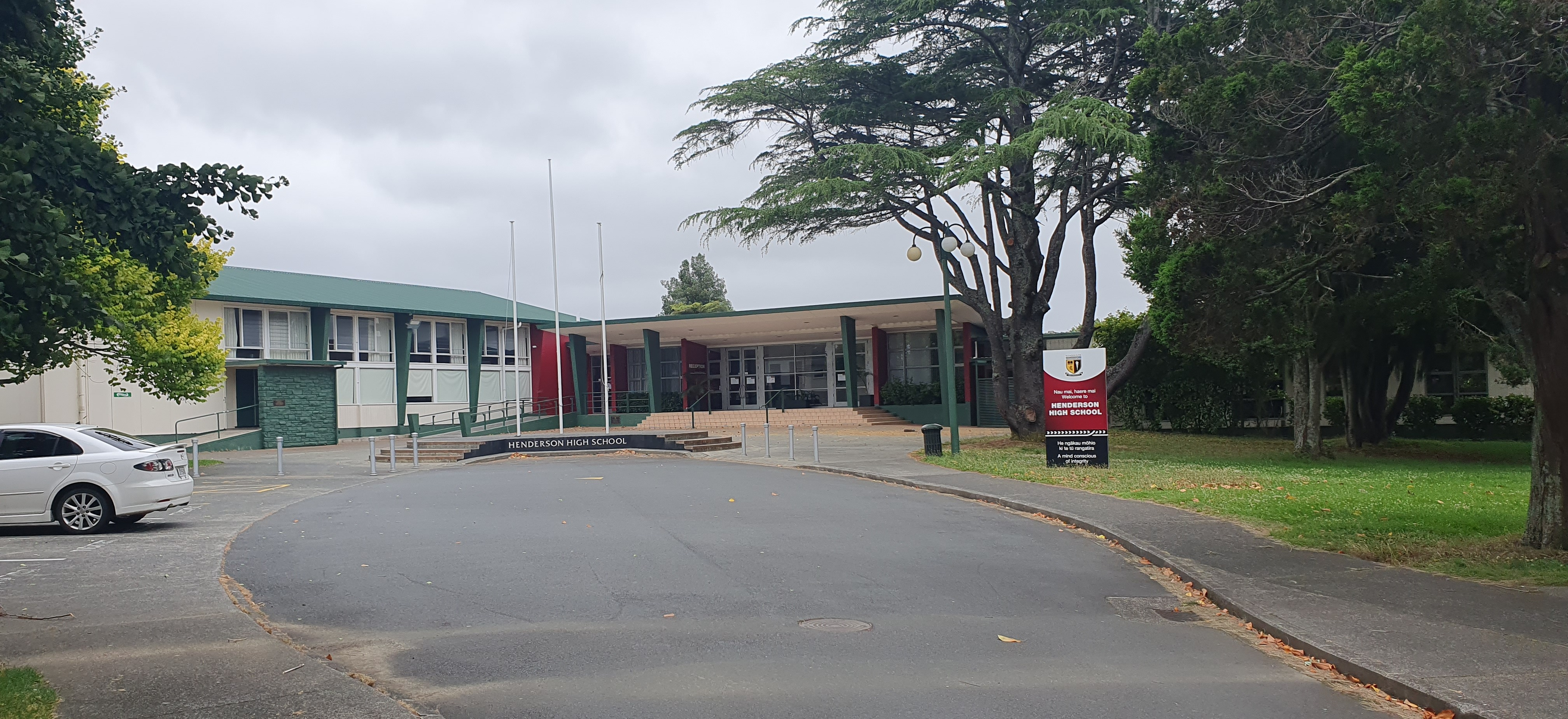

Location
- Henderson Valley Road, Auckland, New Zealand; 36.8832°S 174.6271°E

Information
- Type: State, Co-educational, Secondary
- Motto: Mens conscia recti (A Mind Aware Of Right)
- Established: 1953
- Ministry of Education Institution no.: 45
- Principal: Philippa Durkin
- Enrolment: 1,048 (July 2026)
- Socio-economic decile: 3
- Website: hhs.school.nz

Henderson High School is a co-educational secondary school in the West Auckland suburb of Henderson, New Zealand, catering for students from Year 9 to Year 13. Many notable alumni attended Jubilees held in 2003 (50th) and 2013 (60th). Historically the school has always been an important part of the community and stability of leadership has ensured that it is well resourced with a wide range of facilities. Recent reviews by the Education Review Office have been positive.

== Early history ==
Prior to opening, all students from West Auckland who wanted to attend a high school needed to travel to Avondale College, the Seddon Memorial Technical College (now Western Springs College) or to one of the grammar schools of central Auckland.

In 1950, the Department of Education purchased part of a local dairy farm in Henderson, Auckland and began working on building the school, named after a local businessman Thomas Henderson. When it opened on 1 April 1953, there were "150 third formers, 40 other pupils and a staff of nine, led by the principal Mr A.D.W. Woolcott". Opening the school officially the Minister of Education noted that while it was important for education to be secular and free, the words of Woolcott at the ceremony indicated that there was a "very real spiritual note in the school". By 1963, the school was seen as building a strong tradition and had "become a name to reckoned with both in the sporting field and scholastic". The first annual school prize-giving was held in the Henderson Town Hall in December 1953, with the principal stressing "the benefits of pupils staying at school after their fifteenth birthday, without overlooking the importance of those who work with their hands".

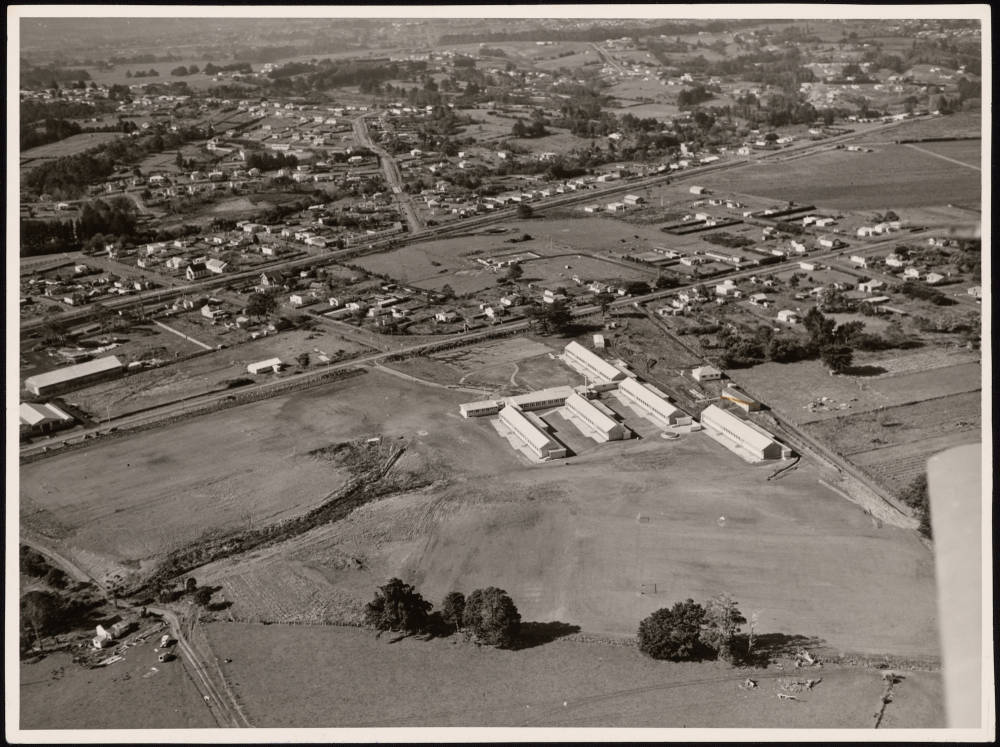
Aerial view of school 1953

From May 1953, the school offered a variety of evening classes for the community, including an English language course for new immigrants. By 1955 there were 320 people enrolled in 23 evening classes.

Because New Zealand had compulsory military training for 18-year-olds in 1953, the boys at the school started cadets in the first week of school in February of that year. This led to the formation of a Cadet Unit which took part in courses organised at local military training camps until disbanding in 1964 when compulsory military training was abandoned in 1963. While the boys were doing fortnightly cadet drills, the girls were able to choose from a wide variety of clubs including "art, embroidery, dressmaking, cooking, typing, singing and talks on Maori history".

The school band was initially attached to the cadet unit to play for ceremonial parades, with drums and pipes used for marching practice. But in 1964 when the cadets closed down, more modern melodies were introduced and an Instrumental Group was formed leading to the beginning of the Chamber Music Group. Annual Music Competitions took place through the 1950s and by 1960, there was a mixed choir. School concerts began in 1957, and the 1958 show included "a play, singing, musical items gymnasts and ballet dancing" with skilful guitar accompaniment from Peter Posa, a student at the time who later went on to become internationally acclaimed as a guitarist. At the last school concert in 1962, the orchestra, one of the biggest in Auckland at the time, played Fireworks Music by Handel.

In 1956 ten students completed the University Examinations with a pass figure higher than the average for the whole country. The senior school grew to 38 pupils by 1957. By 1958, the school had a roll of 550 pupils and a teaching staff of 25. It was noted in a local newspaper that while there was a strong focus on academic training, there was also a "husbandry course...[which included]...general agriculture and horticulture, supported by carpentry, metal-work, blacksmithing and farm bookkeeping".

== Facilities ==
Henderson High School was the first school constructed to a new common design plan, which was used during the post-World War II period to speed up secondary school construction. The "Henderson type school" was a single-storey all-timber school design, with long wings of classrooms facing onto corridors, fanning out from a central spine. It was a derivative of the "Naenae type school" (after its first use at Naenae College in Lower Hutt), which with two stories and mixed concrete and timber construction was too slow for a major school building programme. The Henderson school design lasted four years, 1953 to 1956, before it was replaced in 1957 with a new design centred on self-contained classroom blocks. Other schools in the Auckland area built to the Henderson design include One Tree Hill College, Rangitoto College and Selwyn College. The 'Woolcott' Library developed from an empty room in 1953 to a free-standing building that was opened in 1971 with students transporting "thousands of books to their new home in a mammoth effort amid much good humour".

A new school hall was officially opened on Saturday 25 June 1960 after a week of celebrations including a ball, a mannequin parade fashion parade and the orchestra playing with such "precision...[that the]...woodwind group...were asked to play in the Town Hall Festival". With the help of parents and the community, the swimming pool was opened in 1963. Other sports on offer at the time included athletics, hockey, football, cricket, indoor basketball, rugby and softball and the school's timetable allowed one afternoon each week when students could participate in a sport of their choice. Work began on a new gymnasium in 1975 and after considerable fundraising to meet the costs of construction, was officially opened in 1978.

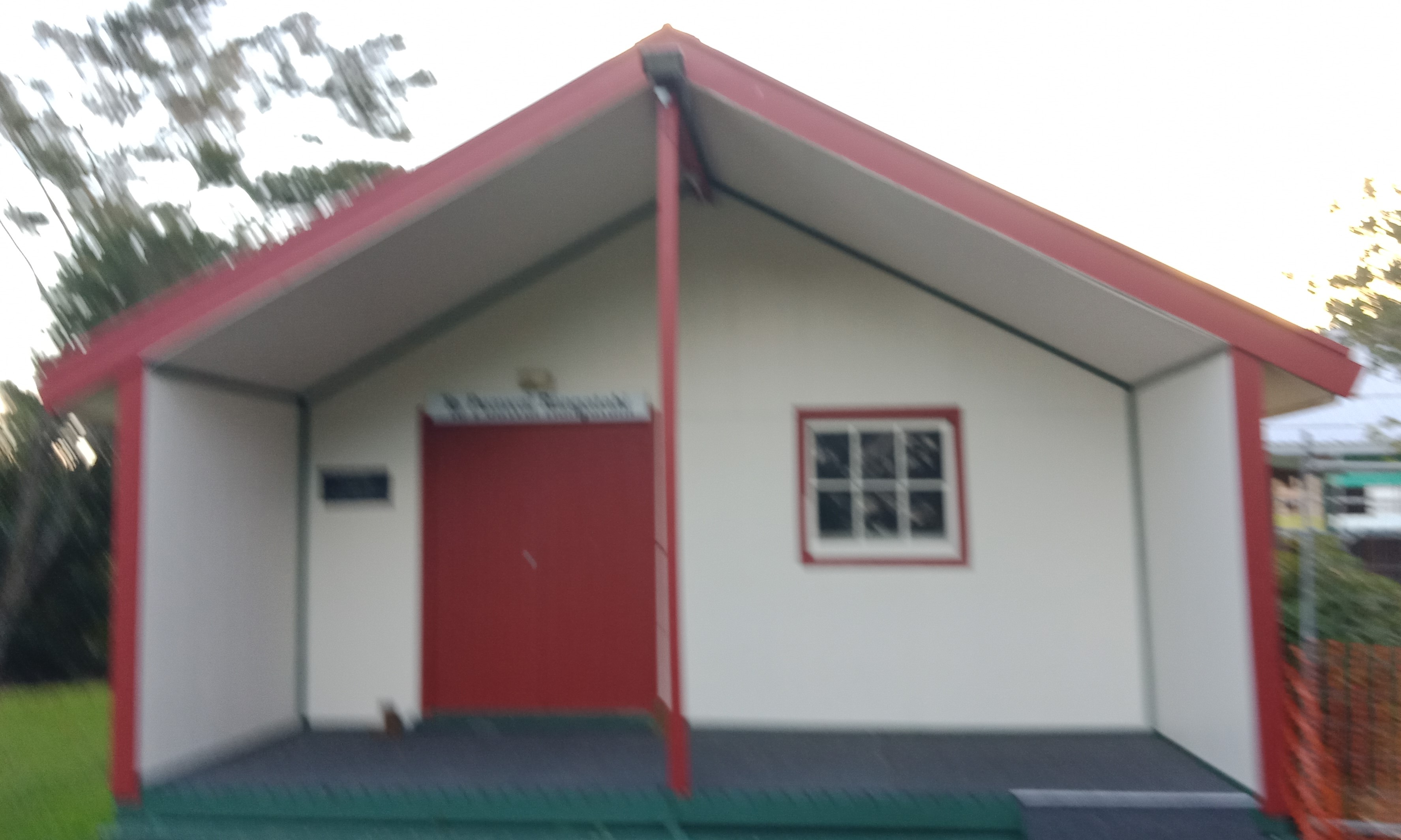
The Marae

A meeting was held in 1984 to discuss the proposed marae for the school and the Board of Governors specified that it was to be "a multicultural teaching Marae for the use of HHS pupils and not a community Marae". After the site was consecrated by Sir Paul Reeves on 8 August 1985, a building was moved there to establish the Wharenui in December 1985.

In 2003 The Parekura Centre, which had previously been known as the Work Experience Unit, was set up to support the learning of students with special education needs. A local television presenter John 'Cocksy' Cocks joined forces with Ford New Zealand, Variety, the Children's Charity and celebrities Bob Harvey, Ewen Gilmour and contestants from the NZ Idol TV show, to do a 'makeover' of the centre in 2006. The refurbished centre, which had been painted and fully carpeted with a new entry area, kitchen and garden was unveiled on Friday 8 September 2006. The grand opening, was a procession of around 150 guests, including TVNZ presenter Simon Dallow in strange vehicles, collecting donations and bringing "loud sirens, horns, music and water canons...[and there was]...even an RAF helicopter on the front field".

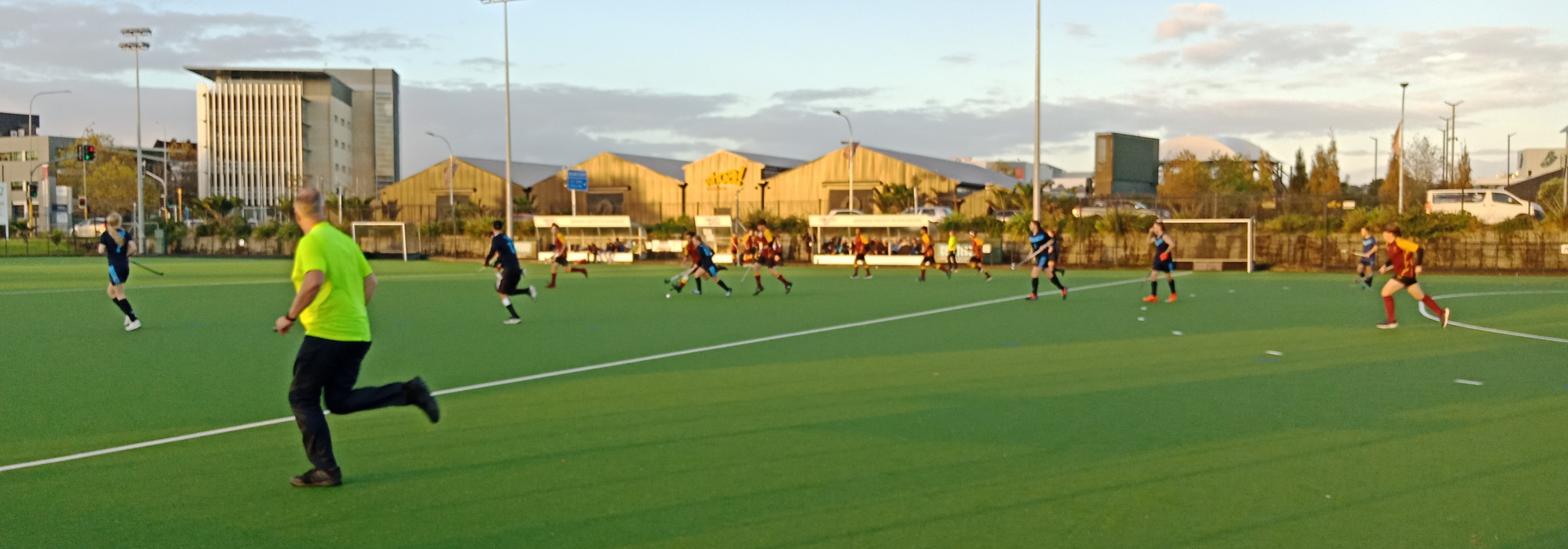
Hockey field

Overseen by the Waitakere Regional Hockey Turf Trust, the school completed a $2 million full-sized hockey pitch in 2011. Also including extra tennis and netball courts, this was part of an ambitious project led by Purcell to improve academic performance through physical activity.The pitch, which had floodlights, was seen by the principal at the time Mike Purcell as being a community resource and Black Sticks coach Shane McLeod acknowledged that "it was a great move by the school and I think they'll see their players grow and achieve". Partly funded by Auckland Council through its Sports and Recreation Fund, a hockey pavilion was opened at the school in February 2022. It was stage two of the project that started in 2010, to develop the hockey turf, and with toilets, changing rooms, a kitchen and a multi-use space, the facility would be used by the school, a local hockey club and the community. Waitākere Ward Councillor Linda Cooper said "this [was] another amazing facility that westies deserve, can enjoy and be proud of, and has been a dream of the Waitakere Hockey Turf Trust for over a decade".

In 2016, as part of their master's thesis work, two architecture students at the School of Architecture and Planning at the University of Auckland collaborated with Henderson High School to design new shelters for the school staff and students. The buildings were in the style of "garden pavilions... structures that were popular in 18th and 19th century England, designed to enhance the landscape", and the Principal, Mike Purcell said he was "very pleased with the outcomes generated by our involvement with the School of Architecture and Planning. Designed and built by the students the structures provide both a practical and aesthetic benefit to the school". A successful application by the school in 2018 to The Trusts Community Foundation for $35,045 to buy a van allowed more students to be transported to extra-curricular activities.

== 50th jubilee ==
The School's 50th jubilee was celebrated from 30 May to 1 June 2003. The chair of the Jubilee Committee, Mary Harrison, said that there had been registrations from New Zealand and overseas [with] "more than 1400 former pupils and current pupils and staff expected to join the festivities". Former students who were high achievers in sport nationally, including former All Blacks Michael Jones, Mark Mayerhofler and Eroni Clarke were scheduled to attend. Jones said "it was a wonderful school. I'm very thankful for my years at Henderson High School and how they have shaped my life. I don't have anything but fond memories". Other notable ex-pupils attending were Phil Clarke, Richie Guy, motor racing champion Paul Radisich, Silver Fern netballer Leonne Wendt Leaver, Timo Tagaloa and Leo Lafaiali'i. The former Mayor of the Henderson Borough Council, Assid Corban, donated a home movie he had of the school's opening day in February 1953. The principal, Owen Hoskin said, "the result is a wonderful, historic piece of film...[and]...there are going to be heaps of old students who will love to watch it".

== Principals ==
=== A.D.W. Woolcott (1953–1964) ===
When the founding principal Mr Woolcott announced that he was retiring at the end of 1964 a local newspaper reported that amongst the many successes of the school were high levels of achievement in sport, strong programmes in the Arts and drama and pupils who had gained a wide range of professional qualifications. Mr Woolcott was credited with developing the body and "refining the emotions as well as training the intellect". Woolcott had high expectations of students and saw homework as one way to demonstrate this, with the prospectus at the time noting "it is not intended that homework be burdensome, but to be of value it should be regular. In no case should a statement a student has no homework be accepted, for he can profitably occupy any spare time in memorizing or in reading".

=== G.B. Allen (1965–1978) ===
G.B (Peter) Allen, who had been deputy principal since the opening of the school in 1953, succeeded Woolcott as principal in 1965. Allen was noted for a distinguished career in the armed forces during World War II, including the receiving of the Military Medal for Bravery. Allen was awarded the Woolf Fisher Fellowship in 1968 which allowed him to go overseas and examine different teaching practices and models of leadership. He also received the Queens Service Medal for Public Services in 1978. In 1978, coinciding with the opening of a new gymnasium, the school celebrated its 25th birthday and Allen was acknowledged for supporting the work of Woolcott in implementing the school motto 'A Mind is Aware of What is Right'. Mary Harrison, the president of the Henderson High School Association said she was "delighted with the response from people all over the country...[and forecasted]...an interesting and enjoyable weekend to suit most tastes". A significant change during the 'Allen' era was the increase in the roll from 662 students in 1965 to 1438 in 1974.

=== Doug K. Lilly (1980–1986) ===
A former lecturer in Geography at Canterbury University and Deputy Principal at Pukekohe High School, Lilly became principal in 1980. Lilly was very involved in the community, working on the local Council, being a member of Rotary and a Justice of the Peace. Himself a musician, Lilly had a passion for music and the arts and these areas flourished at the school under his leadership.

=== Ian Kahurangi Mitchell (1986–1997) ===
Before coming to Henderson High, Mitchell, who spoke fluent Samoan and Māori, was curriculum development office at Hillary College. He was welcomed to Henderson High with a Māori ceremony, a guard of honour and the presence of several Members of Parliament and other local dignitaries including the Mayor Assid Corban. In 1995, Mitchell noted that some children were coming to school hungry and Henderson High were going to set up a food bank for families.

=== Owen Hoskin (1998–2006) ===
Hoskin became principal of the school in 1998 and in March of that year, it was planned to complete an upgrade of the staffroom, administration area, classrooms, gymnasium and pool. Hoskin said that Henderson High needed to "get back in step with the community", and it was his job to make sure the school was well marketed. By 2003, the school had conducted a community survey, developed a website and marketing video and received acknowledgement from the New Zealand Ministry of Education, whose senior manager Mary Sinclair said that "a communications strategy allowed a school to have a planned and systematic approach to providing information to its community". A recipient of the New Zealand Order of Merit for community contributions and a former city councillor, Hoskin later reflected that when he first arrived at Henderson, there had been challenges with the school's reputation but these had been addressed by "raising student achievement, refurbishing the school grounds and property and rebuilding the roll of the school".

=== Joy Eaton (2006–2010) ===
Prior to becoming principal at Henderson High School, Eaton had worked at Waitakere College as a Deputy Principal, been acting Principal at the Kelston Deaf Education Centre and participated in an international research study that compared middle leadership in schools in New Zealand and the United Kingdom. Performing arts continued to develop a higher profile at this time with a musical, hip-hop dance competition and the starting of the Rock School in 2007. The choir won their class at the West Auckland Competition in 2007 and were later filmed for a national TV programme. In March of the same year, students from the school's special needs unit attended the Special Olympics Athletics Day at Mt Smart Stadium and were later invited to participate in a basketball training programme sponsored by Special Olympics.

=== Michael Purcell (2010–2020) ===
Mike Purcell took over as principal in June 2010 after returning from coaching and training with some of the world's top tennis players in London, and this along with the fact that his son had represented New Zealand in the sport, had confirmed the importance of having a strong work ethic and striving for goals was essential for young people. He focused on academic achievement, building relationships between school and home and maintaining "high standards of behaviour and personal appearance".

=== Ros Robertson (2020–2024) ===
Robertson, accompanied by her whanau, colleagues and students from her previous school, Rangitoto, was officially welcomed to the school at the end of Term 3, 2020.

== Student initiatives ==
- Three students at Henderson High School converted bicycles into electric bicycles in 2018. They told Seven Sharp on TVNZ that they had recycled lithium batteries from old laptops they collected from the community and put them into e-bike batteries. Their teacher noted that they had got a $15,000 grant from the Ministry of Youth Development.

== International students ==
The school is a signatory to the Code of Practice for the Pastoral Care of International Students, a document that provides guidelines to ensure that education providers "take all reasonable steps to protect international students; and ensuring, so far as is possible, that international students have in New Zealand a positive experience that supports their educational achievement".

== Reviews and assessments ==
=== The Education Review Office (ERO) ===
The school was reviewed by the Education Review Office (ERO) in 2017 and the Summary of the report noted:

Since ERO’s 2014 evaluation, the school has continued lifting student achievement and has responded very effectively to students whose learning and achievement needs acceleration. The school has a highly focused and coordinated approach to raising student achievement and developing lifelong learners. This approach is well planned and is supported by the board, school leaders, staff and the community.

The Report also showed that at the time the gender composition of the school was boys 50%, girls 50%; and the ethnic composition was Māori 24%, Pakeha 47%, Pasifika 17%, Asian 7% and Other 4%.

=== New Zealand Qualifications Authority (NZQA) ===
The Managing National Assessment Report of the school by NZQA was completed in September 2016. Areas of strength identified in the report included the school having high expectations of students, sound processes of self-review based on data analysis, good support for students and "widespread use of digital tools by teachers and students...[so that]...the school is well-positioned to respond to digital developments by NZQA".

== Notable staff ==
- Jack Elder, politician

== Notable alumni ==
- Eroni Clarke, rugby union player
- Trelise Cooper, fashion designer
- Suzanne Donaldson, musician
- Jan Hellriegel, musician
- Michael Jones, rugby union player
- Danny Lendich, business owner
- Gaven Martin, mathematician
- Mark Mayerhofler, rugby union player
- Alfred Ngaro, politician
- Peter Posa, musician
- Terry Sturm, editor and academic
