= Danny Lendich =

New Zealand businessman (1944–2025)

- Born: Danilo Stanislav Lendich; 19 January 1944
- Died: 13 May 2025 (aged 81); Auckland, New Zealand
- Occupation: Businessman
- Known for: Bringing Wendy's to New Zealand

Danilo Stanislav Lendich (19 January 1944 – 13 May 2025) was a New Zealand businessman. Based in Auckland, he started his career at the age of 12, eventually founding and operating an earthmoving and hauling company, Lendich Construction. In 1988, Lendich opened the first Wendy's franchise in New Zealand. He was also a midget car owner and sponsored several drivers, including Sleepy Tripp, Craig Baird, and Jerry Coons Jr.

== Early life ==
Lendich was born on 19 January 1944 to Croatian parents, Filip and Ruze Lendich, who had emigrated to New Zealand in the period leading up to World War II and farmed an apple and pear orchard. When he was 12 years old, Lendich—who had been using his family's tractor to work for local farmers—persuaded his father to purchase a bulldozer so that he could start his own contracting business. He was educated at Henderson High School in West Auckland.

== Business ventures ==
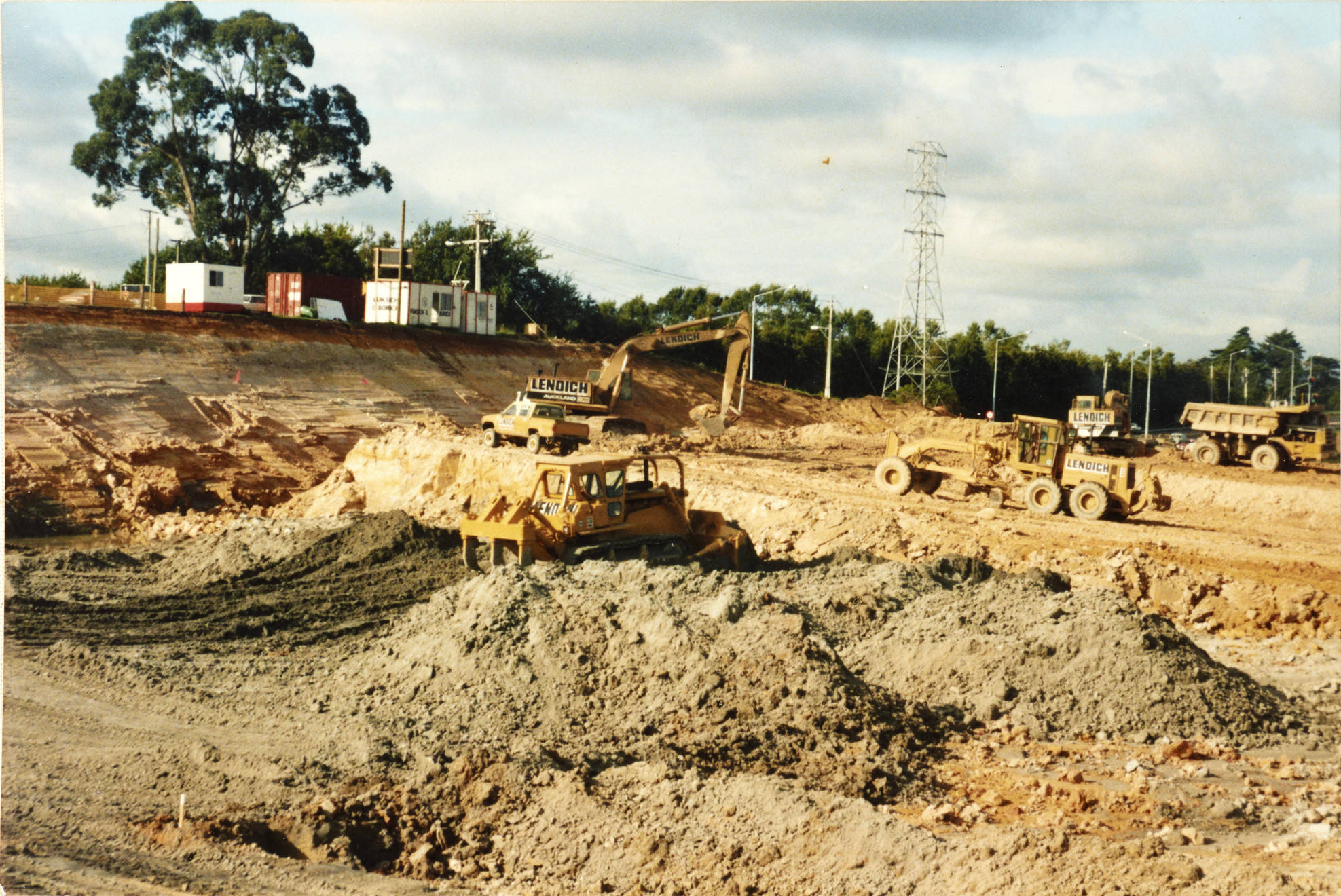
Lendich Construction working on Westgate Shopping Centre in Massey, 1994

Lendich's first business venture was an earthmoving and hauling company, Lendich Construction, which he started in the 1960s after working for neighbouring farmers.

Lendich and his wife, Dianne, opened the first Wendy's franchise in New Zealand in 1988; they became Wendy's franchisors after they encountered the restaurant during trips to midget car races in the United States. In 1993, Lendich hired Dave Vousden, known as "Kiwi Dave", to star in Wendy's commercials in New Zealand. Lendich and his family eventually opened and operated 22 Wendy's locations in New Zealand through a corporation, Wendy's New Zealand (also known as Wendy's NZ or Wendco); his daughter, Danielle, took over as CEO of the corporation in 1999. In 2022, Wendy's NZ announced that it was up for sale. Flynn Group, a global franchise operator, purchased Wendy's NZ in May 2024 for an unknown price. Lendich and his family also operated petrol stations and owned properties in Auckland.

== Midget car racing ==
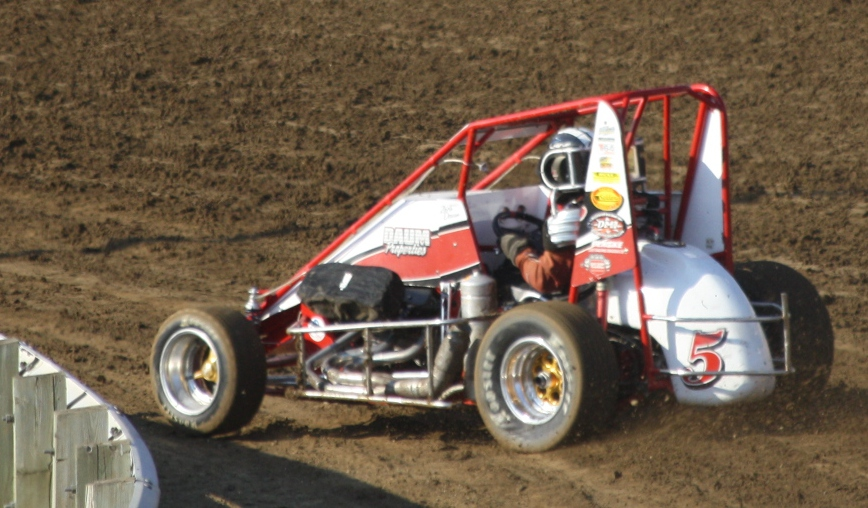
Jerry Coons Jr. racing a midget car at Angell Park Speedway in 2012

Lendich owned midget cars through his racing team, D.L. Motorsports. He sponsored several drivers who collectively won hundreds of races, including Sleepy Tripp, Graham Standring, Craig Baird, Sammy Swindell, Jerry Coons Jr. and Alex Bright. Lendich said that his interest in midget car racing stemmed from the engineering aspects, and that he worked on the cars that he owned.

== Death ==
Lendich died at his home in Auckland on 13 May 2025, aged 81.
