= LendUp =

American financial technology company

- Company type: Private
- Industry: Consumer finance
- Founded: 2012
- Founders: Sasha Orloff; Jake Rosenberg (CTO)
- Defunct: January 2022; 4 years ago
- Fate: Legally dissolved for repeated deceptive marketing and other fair-lending violations.
- Headquarters: San Francisco, California
- Area served: Nationwide
- Key people: Anu Shultes (CEO); Bill Donnelly (CFO); Vijesh Iyer (COO); Nigel Morris (Board Chair)
- Products: Payday loans, installment loans
- Number of employees: c. 250 (Q3, 2018)
- Website: www.lendup.com

LendUp was an American online direct lender. It offered payday loans, installment loans, and credit cards to consumers with low credit scores using publicly available data to assess creditworthiness. The company referred to its customers as "the emerging middle class." LendUp also issued credit cards in partnership with Tom Steyer's Beneficial State Bank.

LendUp was co-founded in 2011 by stepbrothers Sasha Orloff and Jake Rosenberg and incubated at Y Combinator. The company positioned itself as a "socially responsible lender" and claimed to provide access to financial services for "underbanked" Americans in addition to lower cost credit and credit-building opportunities.

LendUp received $325 million in equity and debt financing from PayPal, Kleiner Perkins Caufield & Byers, Google Ventures, Andreessen Horowitz, Alexis Ohanian, Y Combinator and QED Investors, among others. In an article published shortly after the company's launch, Time Magazine wrote that LendUp "says it's not like other payday lenders. Yet the fees it charges — a little over $30 to borrow $200 for two weeks — are similar to what its competitors charge."

In 2016, LendUp raised $150 million to develop a credit card product in January, then paid $6.3 million in fines for deceptive practices and widespread violations of payday and installment loan laws in September.

In January 2019, Anu Shultes was appointed CEO. A corporate restructuring allowed LendUp to focus on personal loans. In 2020, it was sued by the Consumer Financial Protection Bureau for violating the Military Lending Act.

== Mission Lane asset sale ==
On December 17, 2018, LendUp entered into an asset sale agreement to sell its credit card business to a Utah limited liability company. The transaction included LendUp Card Services, Inc. (LUCS), LendUp Card Holdings LLC (LUCH), and LendUp Technologies, Inc. (LUT), encompassing all assets related to the credit card business operations. The credit card division had been operating within LendUp since 2015. This sale resulted in the creation of Mission Lane as a separate standalone entity.

In December 2021, as a result of deceptive marketing and fair lending violations, LendUp was fined $100,000 by The U.S. Consumer Financial Protection Bureau. Additionally, the company was required to stop issuing new loans and stop attempts to collect on certain loans. The action was taken to resolve a September 2021 lawsuit that alleged LendUp practiced illegal and deceptive marketing in violation of the 2016 finding. It ceased loan operations in January 2022. On May 8, 2024, the CFPB announced the distribution of nearly $40 million to affected consumers.

As of March 1, 2023, LendUp last filed an annual report in 2020 and purportedly owes $390,332 in taxes.

== Ahead Financials ==
In December 2020, LendUp launched Ahead Financials, which went live the following May. Within a year of launching, Ahead informed customers via email that a "new app was coming".

Ahead was reportedly acquired by Kinly, although customer service hotlines claimed Ahead simply "rebranded its name to Kinly." According to social media, several users were unable to transfer funds or open new accounts. Kinly's sites failed to mention customer transitions and blocked transfers. Additionally, some accounts were closed without notice, blocking access to funds.

Kinly was acquired by Greenwood in May 2023.

== CFPB enforcement ==
In December 2021, the Consumer Financial Protection Bureau obtained a Stipulated Final Judgment and Order (Case No. 3:21-cv-06945-JSC) permanently banning LendUp from issuing subsequent loans.

The order documented violations affecting more than 140,000 consumers. The CFPB found that LendUp:

- Deceived consumers about credit reporting practices and loan availability
- Failed to provide promised credit-building opportunities
- Misrepresented loan terms and costs to borrowers
- Violated the 2016 CFPB consent order on multiple occasions

Section I of the order permanently restrains LendUp from:

- Advertising, marketing, promoting, offering for sale, selling, or providing any extension of credit
- Receiving any remuneration or holding any ownership interest in any person engaged in extending credit
