= Pizza in China =

The presence of pizza restaurant chains has contributed to a significant increase in pizza consumption in mainland China and Hong Kong. This also had an effect of introducing cheese as a culinary ingredient and everyday food in China, which was relatively uncommon in Chinese cuisine prior to the emergence of pizza chains. Pizza Hut opened its first store in China in 1990, and several pizza restaurant chains exist in China today.

== Chains ==
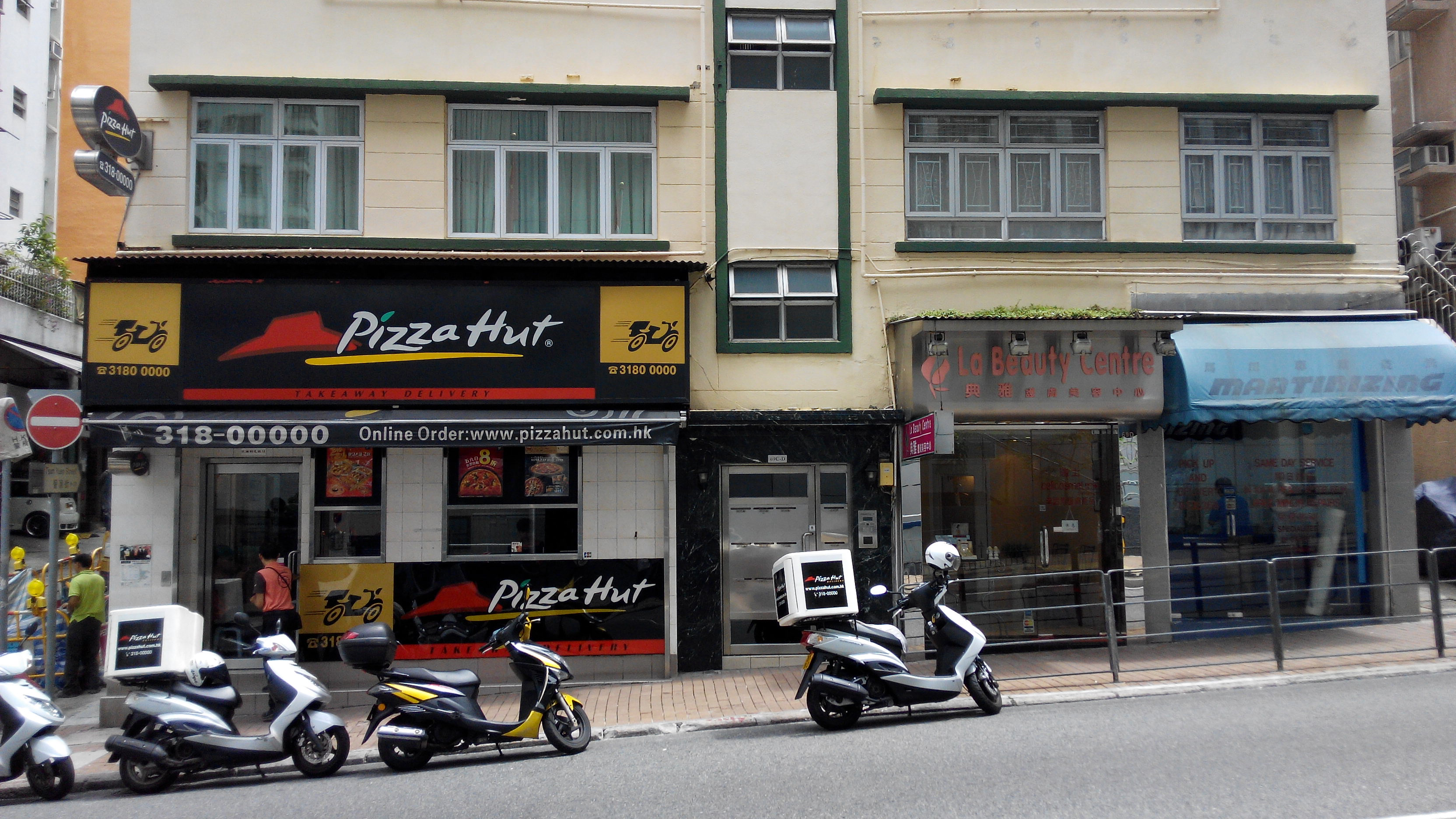
A Pizza Hut restaurant in Happy Valley, Hong Kong. Some of the scooters in front of the store are used for pizza delivery.

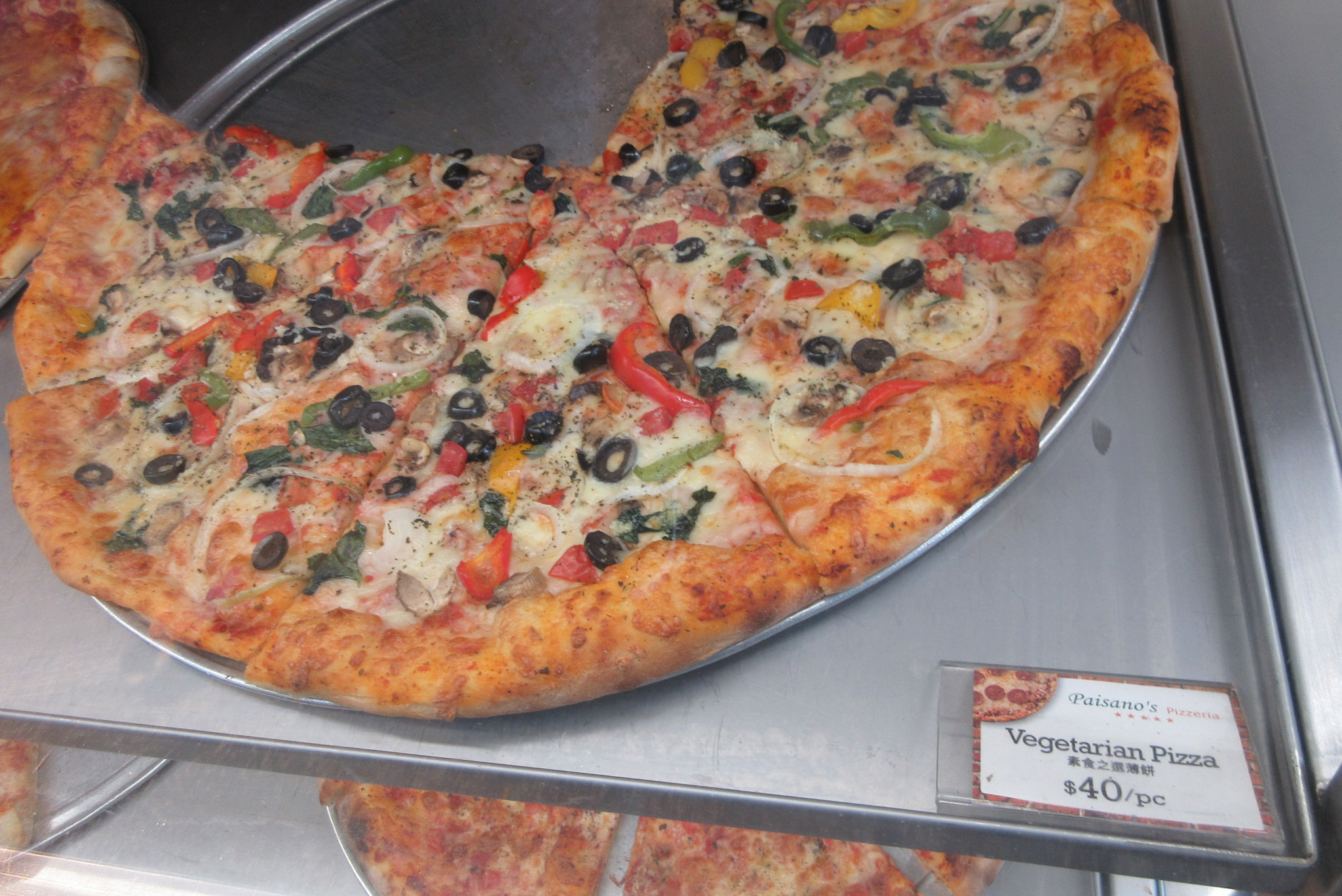
Pizza by the slice at a sidewalk food shop in Hong Kong

=== History ===
Pizza Hut opened its first store in China in 1990, followed by Domino's Pizza in 1995. The two pizza chains both expanded in the Chinese market in the 2000s. Prior to entering the market, Pizza Hut performed market analysis and research into consumer food preferences, tastes, and dining habits, whereas Domino's simply entered the market providing their standard fare. With its planning and research, Pizza Hut was successful in its endeavors, opening over 1,300 stores in the country, whereas Domino's was rather unsuccessful, with under 40 stores in China in 2014. At the time, Domino's provided the company's delivery guarantee of thirty minutes or less, but did not take into account many Chinese cities' heavy vehicle traffic and gridlock. Domino's lack of success in the Chinese market has also been attributed to the chain's fare lacking appeal to Chinese consumers, not having sit-down restaurants (Domino's stores were take-out and delivery only), and the large size of the company's pizzas, which made them difficult for consumers to eat while walking or hanging out on the street.

Prior to establishing restaurants in China, Pizza Hut management was told by experts that many Chinese consumers do not like cheese and may not be able to digest it. (Note: "... cheese is not traditionally a part of the Chinese diet, with many Chinese being lactose-intolerant.") The company's management was also informed that tomato is not a culinary ingredient in China. Per these factors, Pizza Hut was warned that Chinese consumers would not eat pizza. In response to this, Pizza Hut modified their pizza recipes, using less tomato sauce and cheese and including indigenous ingredients that were agreeable to Chinese consumers, such as tuna, crab sticks, soy sauce, chicken and corn. The company also created new pizzas for the Chinese market, such as the Homemade Sweet and Creamy, which resembles apple turnovers, and the Thousand Island dressing pizza, which lacked tomato sauce. As of 2014, Pizza Hut had over 1,300 stores in China, with a particularly strong presence in Shanghai.

=== Present-day ===
As of 2019, Yum Brands owned Pizza Hut has over 2,000 stores in China and Domino's has over 200 with plans to open 1,000 by 2025.

=== Other pizza chains in China ===
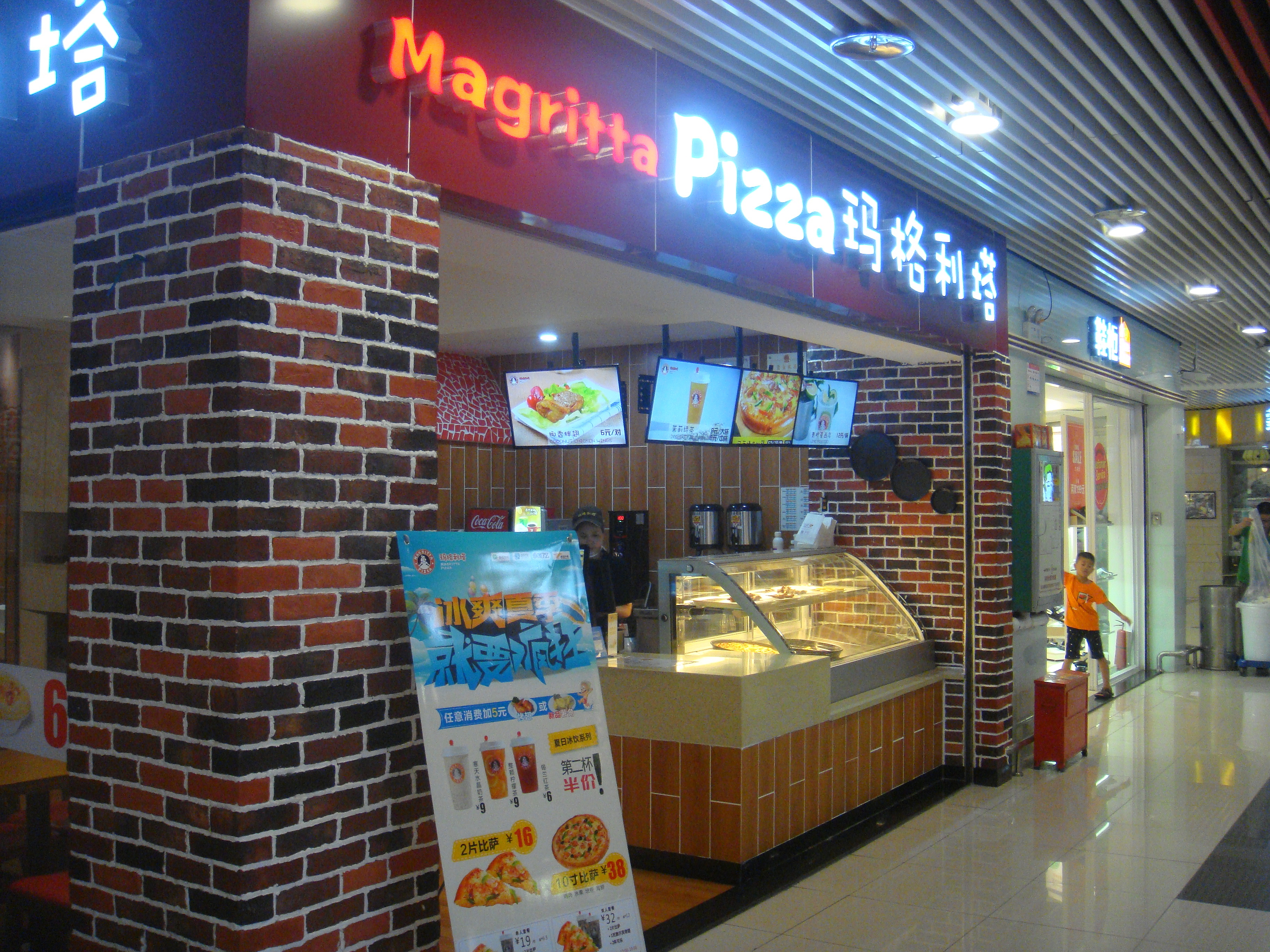
A Magritta Pizza restaurant in Haikou, China

- California Pizza Kitchen has some stores in China.
- Mr. Pizza is a South Korean pizza restaurant chain that had seven stores in China in 2005. Today it has around 28 stores in China.
- Origus Pizza Buffet is a Chinese company that had around 100 stores in China in 2011. Restaurant locations are typically in larger cities.
- Papa John's have been in China since 2009, but sold a portion of their franchise in 2018.
- Peppes Pizza, a Norwegian pizza chain, has some franchise stores in China.
- Pizza Corner is a former pizzeria franchise chain that had a presence in China and Hainan Island, China, particularly in the capital city of Haikou. The company was acquired by the Indian subsidiary of Papa John's Pizza in 2014.
- PizzaExpress had eight stores in China in 2015.
- Pizza Factory is a U.S. pizza restaurant chain that has some stores in China.
- Yellow Cab Pizza is a Filipino restaurant chain that has some stores in China.
- Joe's pizza has two stores in Shanghai, China.
- The Pizza Factory, China's first "build your own pizza" chain has three locations in Guangzhou and Shenzhen

== Supermarkets ==
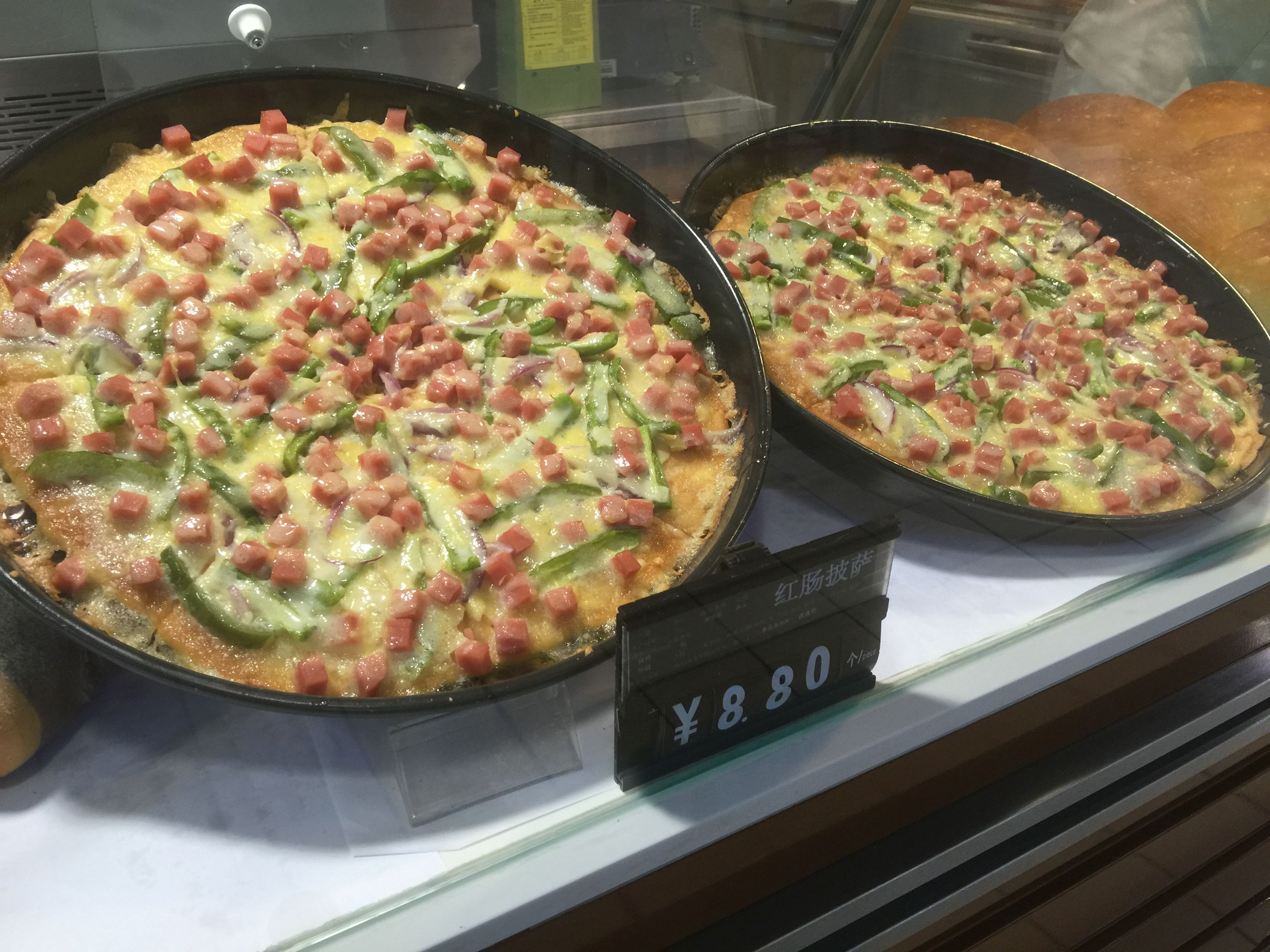
Pizza by the slice in the Carrefour supermarket deli section, Haikou, Hainan

A number of supermarkets sell pizza by the slice that is made in their deli section. It may be prepared using a salad dressing much like Miracle Whip rather than cheese. Toppings often include hot dog bits.

== Independent chains ==
As well as international chains, there are a growing number of strong independent players owned and run by both local and international entrepreneurs. These include Una's, Melrose and Homeslice.

== See also ==
- Cong you bing
- Fast food in China
