= NPC International =

American restaurant franchisee 1962–2020

- Company type: Private
- Industry: Franchise
- Founded: 1962
- Founder: O. Gene Bicknell
- Defunct: 2020
- Products: Franchisee of Pizza Hut & Wendy's
- Owner: Eldridge Industries LLC

NPC International was one of the largest restaurant franchisees and was one of the largest restaurant operators of any kind in the United States. NPC was the largest franchisee of both Pizza Hut and Wendy's, and owned more than 1,200 Pizza Hut locations and 385 Wendy's locations until March 2021.

O. Gene Bicknell opened his first franchised Pizza Hut restaurant in Pittsburg, Kansas in 1962. In 1984, Bicknell and NPC went public, finishing the decade with 320 locations. The company then expanded by buying more Pizza Hut restaurants. In the 1990s, NPC acquired, and then later sold, both Skippers Seafood & Chowder House and Tony Roma's restaurant chains. Under the leadership of CEO Jim Schwartz, the company went private in 2001 and underwent two separate private equity acquisitions in 2006 and 2011.

In 2012, NPC acquired 36 Pizza Hut restaurants (27 Delivery/Carry Out and 9 Dine In) in and around the Jacksonville, FL market. It would be their last Pizza Hut acquisition as a company.

In 2013, NPC acquired its first Wendy's restaurants.

In November 2013, NPC acquired 54 Wendy's locations in Salt Lake City from The Wendy's Company.

In June 2014, NPC acquired 56 Wendy's locations in North Carolina and Virginia from Carlisle Corporation.

In March 2017, NPC acquired 62 Wendy's locations in south-central Pennsylvania from Valenti Mid-Atlantic. In June of the same year, it acquired 140 Wendy's locations formerly owned by DavCo Restaurants, primarily in Baltimore, Virginia and Washington, DC.

NPC filed for Chapter 11 bankruptcy on July 1, 2020. Analysts pointed to a "perfect storm of problems...including coronavirus-related shutdowns, a massive debt burden of nearly $1 billion and rising labor and food costs." NPC reached an agreement with Pizza Hut to close 300 of its locations. Following the closures, the leases of 163 of the former sites were put up for sale.

In November 2020, Flynn Restaurant Group submitted a $816 million bid to acquire the entirety of NPC's business, exceeding NPC's asking price of $725 million.
