= Flynn Group =

Operator of franchise restaurants and health clubs

Flynn Group LP
- Type: Private company
- Industry: Franchising
- Founded: 1999
- Founder: Greg Flynn
- Headquarters: San Francisco, USA
- Areas served: Australia, New Zealand, USA
- Number of employees: 72,000 (2024)

Flynn Group LP is a major operator of franchise restaurants and health clubs. They operate approximately 2,600 franchise locations around the world, primarily Applebee’s, Pizza Hut, Arby's, Wendy's, Taco Bell, Panera Bread and Planet Fitness.

== History ==
The Group was founded in 1999 by Greg Flynn. Its first acquisitions were eight Applebee's franchises. Early financing was provided by Goldman Sachs. Applebees was initially wary of the Flynn Group controlling too many franchises and entered an agreement which limited the Group to 11% of franchises. In 2007, Applebees, then under new ownership, lifted the restriction and sold the Group a number of company owned stores. The Group expanded its Applebees holdings during the Great Recession.

In January 2013, the Group entered the fast food market by acquiring Southern Bells, a Taco Bell franchisee with 76 units in Indiana, Illinois, and Kentucky.

In August 2013, Flynn acquired Gateway Bells, a Taco Bell franchisee in the Midwest, primarily in Missouri and Illinois (mostly in St. Louis).

In 2018, the Group reported yearly sales of 2.3 billion. The Group historically avoided hamburger franchises, preferring niches with more differentiation between competitors.

Also in 2018, Flynn acquired 368 Arby's franchises from U.S. Beef, becoming the largest Arby's franchisee in the world.

In 2021, the Group acquired 937 Pizza Hut franchises during the bankruptcy of NPC International.

The Group began buying Wendy's franchises in 2021. As of 2024, it operated approximately 5% of Wendy's in the United States with a total of around 300 stores. It is also the master franchisee for Wendy's in New Zealand and Australia. The New Zealand franchisee Wendco (NZ) Ltd. was acquired in 2023 from the Lendich family.

In 2024, they claimed to be the largest operator of franchises in the world. They were also the largest Applebees operator in the world with more than 450 restaurants. Annual sales were approximately $4.5 billion.

In 2024, the Group reportedly explored the sale of a majority stake in the company. However the company quickly denied that they had with Greg Flynn clarifying that they were instead undergoing an equity recapitalization.

In March 2024, in response to claims that the Group had inserted a loophole into California law which would allow Panera franchises to charge lower wages than other restaurants, Gregg Flynn said that all of the Group's restaurants in California would pay $20 dollars an hour or better.

In August 2024, Flynn acquired 83 Wendy's units in Pennsylvania and New Jersey. Then in November of the same year, the Group bought 32 Wendy's franchises in Indianapolis.

In October 2026, Flynn was surpassed by AES Restaurant Group as the largest Arby's franchisee in the country after AES acquired 23 stores in Knoxville, Tennessee.

== Operations ==
The Group is headquartered in San Francisco. A support office is located in Independence, Ohio.

As of 2024, the Group operated around 2,600 franchise locations around the world, primarily of Applebee’s, Arby's, Pizza Hut, Wendy's, Panera Bread, Taco Bell, and Planet Fitness. They had approximately 72,000 employees.

The company engages in a complex menu strategy overseen by a team of economists and data scientists.

== Investors ==
Company managers, the Ontario Teachers' Pension Plan, and private equity group Main Post Partners each own roughly a third of the company.

== Animal welfare concerns ==
Flynn Group, as a major franchise operator of Panera Bread locations in the United States, has been indirectly associated with concerns regarding animal welfare practices in Panera Bread’s supply chain. As a franchisee, Flynn Group implements sourcing and operational standards established at the corporate level by Panera Bread.

Panera Bread has faced scrutiny over its animal welfare and ingredient sourcing policies. According to Reuters, internal company documents indicated that the company had adjusted certain sourcing standards, including permitting limited antibiotic use in pork and turkey production and allowing certain animal byproducts in feed for cattle and chicken.

Animal welfare organizations have raised concerns about conditions within industrial supply chains linked to large restaurant operators, including the use of confinement systems such as gestation crates for pig, mutilations without pain relief, and practices associated with intensive farming. Advocacy groups have called on Panera Bread and its franchisees, including Flynn Group, to adopt stronger animal welfare commitments, respect Five Freedoms for animals in their supply chain, and improve transparency.
