= Brad Osgood =

American academic

- Education: University of Michigan
- Scientific career
- Fields: multivariable calculus, signal processing

Brad Osgood is a Professor in the Stanford Department of Electrical Engineering, and, by courtesy, faculty in the Graduate School of Education. Dr. Osgood is affiliated faculty with the Institute for Computational & Mathematical Engineering (ICME) and in the Program in Science, Technology, and Society.

== Education ==
Brad Osgood completed his PhD in mathematics from the University of Michigan in 1980. He joined the Stanford faculty in 1985.

== Research and academic career ==
Dr. Osgood's research interests include math, technology and education. Areas of specialization are complex analysis, differential geometry and signal processing. He is the author or co-author of several textbooks on calculus, applied calculus, and multivariable calculus.

Professor Osgood has worked to place STEM topics in front of a broader audience and elevate their accessibility. Serving as Senior Associate Dean for Student Affairs in the School of Engineering, (2000-2019) and on the Senate of the Academic Council (since 2012) to re-structure STEM curriculum to encourage non-technical students to explore new areas.

== Awards and honors ==
- 2014, Robert Bass University Fellows in Undergraduate Education Program
- 1991, ASSU Teaching Award for classes with more than 30 students.

== Books ==
- Osgood, B., "Lectures on the Fourier Transform and Its Applications", American Mathematical Society, 2019. (ISBN 1470441918)
- Osgood, B., et al., "Applied Calculus", John Wiley & Sons, New York, 2006. (ISBN 1118174925)
- Osgood, B., Gleason, A., Hallett, D. H., "Calculus", John Wiley & Sons, New York, 2005.
- Osgood, B., et al., "Single and Multivariable Calculus", John Wiley & Sons, New York, 2005. (ISBN 1119444195)
