= Tadeusz Iwaniec =

Polish-American mathematician

- Born: October 9, 1947 (age 79); Elbląg, Poland
- Citizenship: United States
- Scientific career
- Fields: Mathematician
- Workplaces: Syracuse University

Tadeusz Iwaniec (born October 9, 1947 in Elbląg) is a Polish-American mathematician, and since 1996 John Raymond French Distinguished Professor of Mathematics at Syracuse University.

He and mathematician Henryk Iwaniec are twin brothers.

== Awards and honors ==
Iwaniec was given the Prize of the President of the Polish Academy of Sciences, 1980, the Alfred Jurzykowski Award in Mathematics in 1997, the Prix 2001 Institut Henri-Poincaré Gauthier-Villars, and the 2009 Sierpinski Medal of the Polish Mathematical Society and Warsaw University. In 1998 he was elected as a foreign member of the Academia di Scienze Fisiche e Matematiche, Italy and in 2012 as a foreign member of the Finnish Academy of Science and Letters. In 2009, Iwaniec received the Sierpiński Medal awarded jointly by the Polish Mathematical Society and the University of Warsaw.
