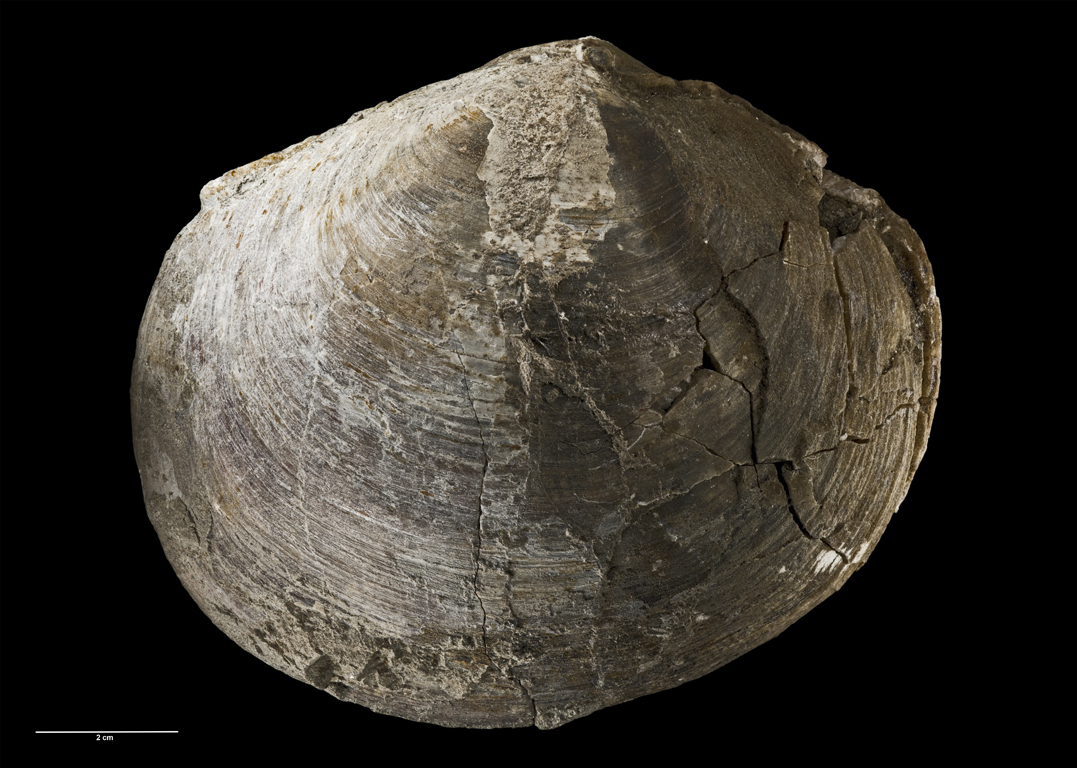
- Holotype from Auckland War Memorial Museum

Scientific classification
- Kingdom: Animalia
- Phylum: Mollusca
- Class: Bivalvia
- Order: Lucinida
- Family: Lucinidae
- Genus: Anodontia
- Species: †A. waharoaensis

Binomial name
- †Anodontia waharoaensis Eagle, 1992

Synonyms
- Anodontia waharoaenis Eagle, 1992; Anodontia (Anodontia) waharoaensis Eagle, 1992

= Anodontia waharoaensis =

Anodontia waharoaensis Temporal range: early Miocene

Extinct species of gastropod

Anodontia waharoaensis is an extinct species of bivalve, a marine mollusc, in the family Lucinidae. Fossils of the species date to early Miocene strata of the west coast of the Auckland Region, New Zealand.

== Description ==
The species has a very large, subcircular shell, which is strongly inflates and globose. It has a low, inconspicuous prosogyrous beak found slightly anterior of the midline. The surface of the shells have comarginal grooves that are weak and irregular. The holotype of the species measures 123 mm (4.8 in) in length and 123 mm (4.8 in) in height, with a postumbonal length of 65 mm (2.6 in) and an anterior-dorsal apical inclination of 25°.

It can be distinguished from A. edentuloides due to A. waharoaensis being three times its size, and by having wrinkled irregular growth lines. A. sphericula differs due to being less circular and having fine concentric threads on the outside of its shell.

== Taxonomy ==
The species was first described by Michael K. Eagle in 1992 as Anodontia (Anodontia) waharoaensis. Eagle named the species after the type locality, Te Waharoa Bay. The currently accepted scientific name does not include the subgenus. The holotype was collected on 24 May 1992 by Eagle from Te Waharoa Bay, south of Muriwai, Auckland Region, and is held in the collections of Auckland War Memorial Museum.

When Eagle described the species, it was the only known member of Anodontia to be found in New Zealand. In 2018, Kazutaka Amano, Crispin Little and Kathleen Campbell argued that the species was not part of Anodontia, but instead a member of the Pegophyseminae subfamily of Lucinidae due to its size, however did not specify a genus.

== Distribution ==
This extinct marine species occurs in early Miocene strata of the Tirikohua Formation of New Zealand, on the west coast of the Waitākere Ranges of the Auckland Region, New Zealand.

== Gallery ==
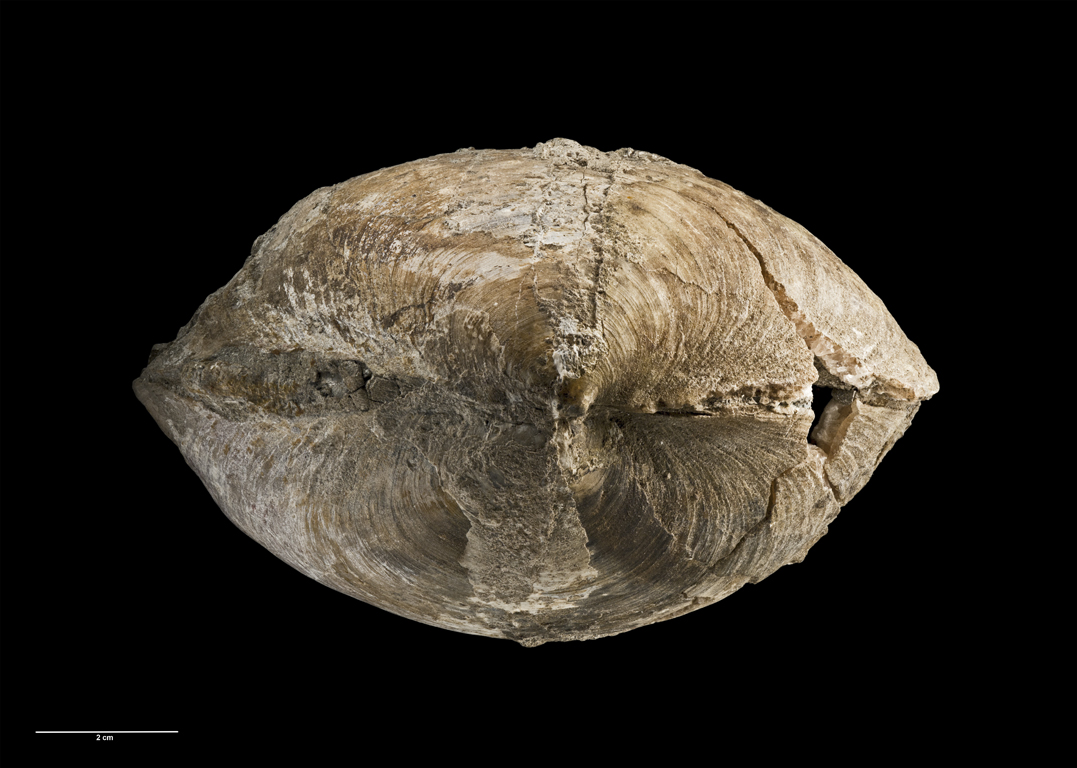
Side view of holotype

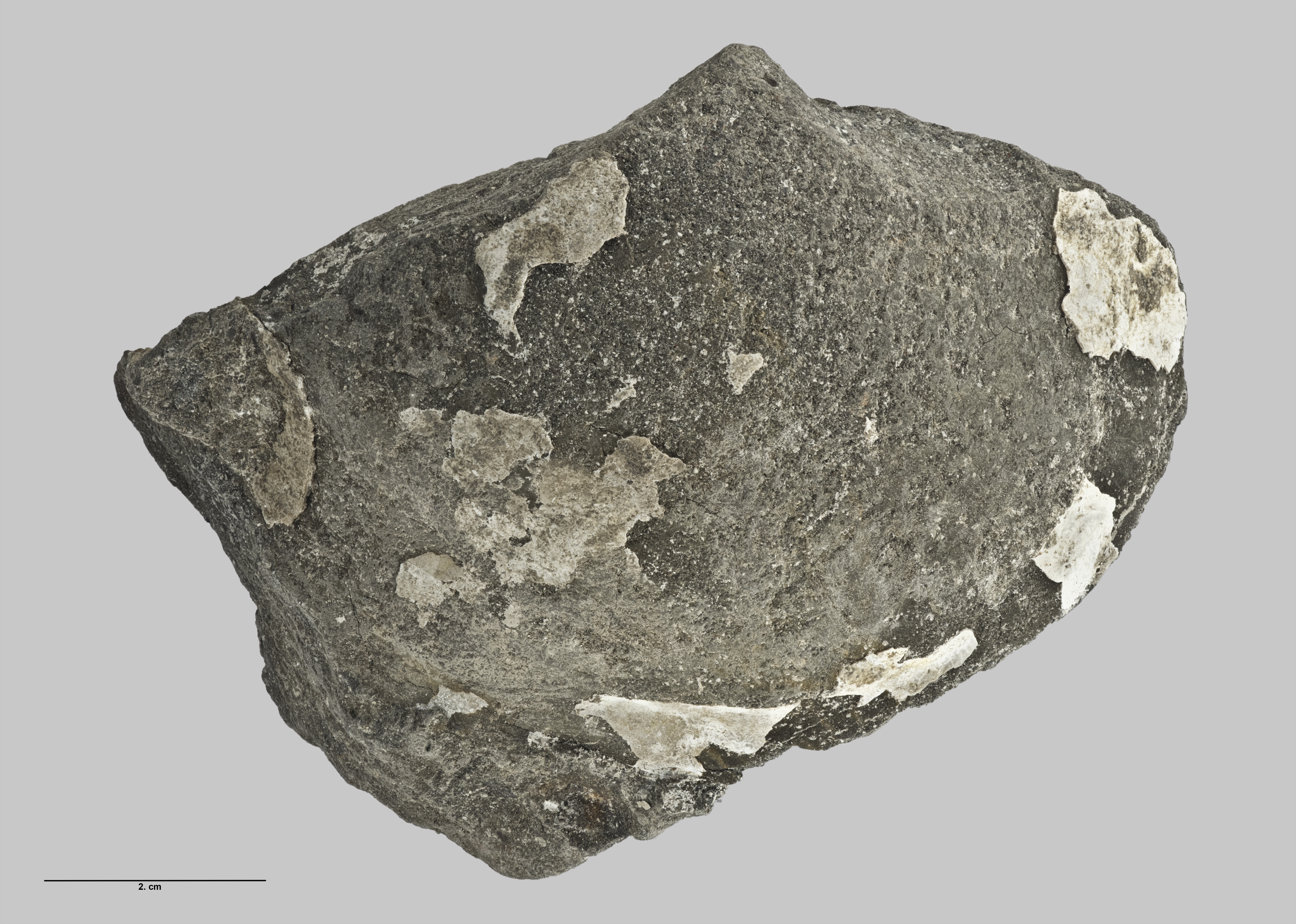
Type specimen
