= Oaia Island =

Island in New Zealand

Native name: Motu-ō-Haea
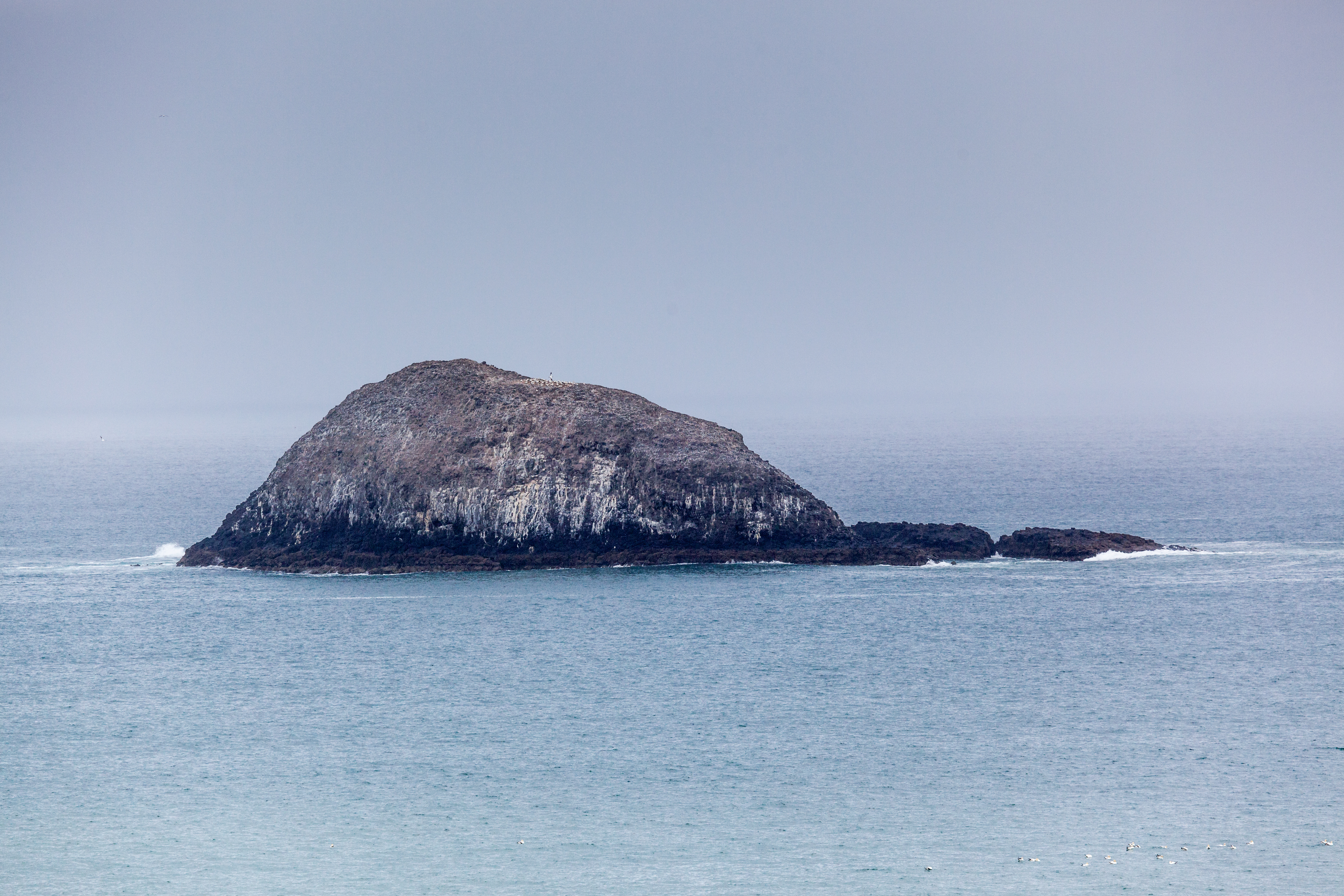
- Oaia Island seen from Muriwai Beach
- Interactive map of Oaia Island

Geography
- Location: Auckland
- Coordinates: 36°50′26″S 174°24′39″E
- Adjacent to: Tasman Sea
- Area: 1,400 m^{2} (15,000 sq ft)
- Length: 60 m (200 ft)
- Width: 30 m (100 ft)
- Highest elevation: 25 m (82 ft)

Administration
- New Zealand

Oaia Island is an island on the west coast of the Auckland Region, New Zealand, near Muriwai. Home to an Australasian gannet colony, the island was traditionally used as a seasonal food resource for Tāmaki Māori iwi, including Te Kawerau ā Maki. Over the 21st century, the gannet population grew significantly, which had a negative impact on the island's flora, and led to gannets colonising areas of the Muriwai mainland. The island is a known location where the rare korowai gecko has been found.

== Geography ==
Oaia Island is located off the west coast of the Auckland Region near Muriwai, approximately 1.4 kilometres (0.87 mi) due west of Maukatia Bay and Collins Bay. The island is adjacent to Muriwai Regional Park. It is likely an early Miocene eroded remnant of pillow lava flow from the Waitākere volcano.

== Biodiversity ==
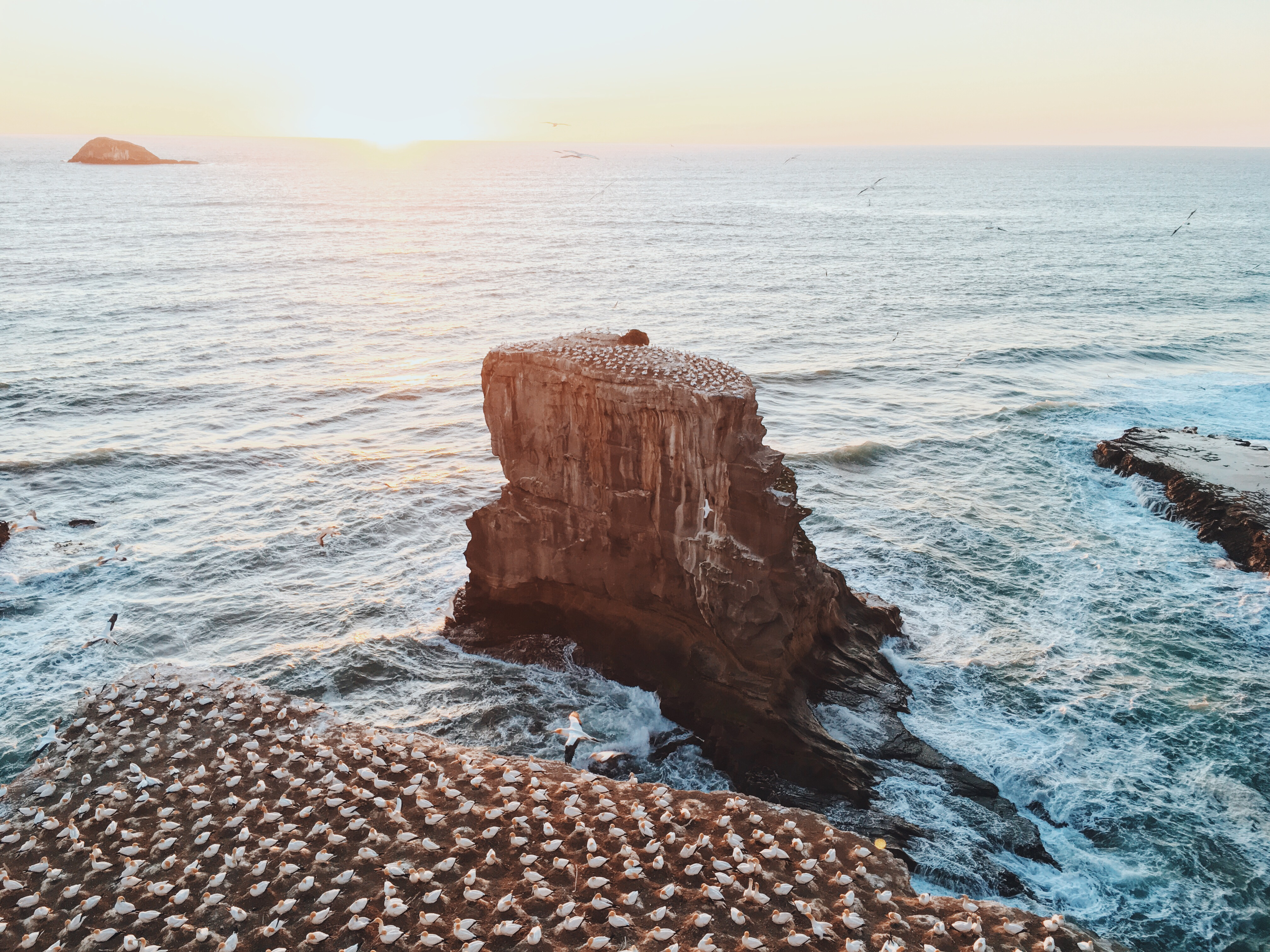
Oaia Island, with Motutara Island in the foreground. As gannet populations increased on Oaia Island, the birds colonised Motutara Island and the surrounding mainland areas at Muriwai.

The island is home to an Australasian gannet colony. The population increased by more than five times between 1940 and 1970 to a total of 892 breeding pairs, which had a negative effect on vascular plant life on the island. As the colony expanded, gannets began to settle at the Muriwai gannet colony to the east. The island has been classified as identified as an Important Bird Area by BirdLife International, as a part of the Muriwai and North Auckland Seabird Flyway areas.

Flora on the island includes Disphyma australe (New Zealand ice plant), Chenopodium allanii and Coprosma repens (taupata), with historic records indicating Lepidium oleraceum previously was found on the island. Seashore earwigs have been identified on Oaia Island, and New Zealand fur seals are known to visit the island.

The island is a habitat for the rare korowai gecko, which was first identified as living on the island in 1954; then thought to be a different species of gecko, Woodworthia maculata.

== History ==
The traditional Tāmaki Māori name for the island is Motu-ō-Haea ("Brilliant White Island"), a reference to gannett and seagull guano colouring the island white. The island was traditionally visited by Te Kawerau ā Maki, as a place where food resources could be collected in calm weather, including birds, bird eggs, and kekeno (New Zealand fur seals).

In 1902, politician and later Mayor of Auckland City, Edwin Mitchelson, constructed a wooden mansion at Muriwai which he named Oaia, after the island.

Oaia Island is the subject of Colin McCahon's acrylic landscape Moby Dick Is Sighted Off Muriwai Beach (1972), which was featured in a New Zealand Post stamp campaign in 1997.
