= Anodontia philippiana =

Scientific classification
- Kingdom: Animalia
- Phylum: Mollusca
- Class: Bivalvia
- Order: Lucinida
- Superfamily: Lucinoidea
- Family: Lucinidae
- Genus: Anodontia
- Species: A. philippiana

Binomial name
- Anodontia philippiana (Reeve, 1850)

Synonyms
- Lucina philippiana; Pegophysema philippiana; Anodontia schrammi

Species of bivalve

Anodontia philippiana, or the chalky buttercup, is a species of bivalve mollusc in the family Lucinidae. It can be found burrowing in soft substrate in shallow waters along the Atlantic coast of North America, its range extending from North Carolina in the United States to the West Indies and Bermuda.

== Description ==
The chalky buttercup grows to a maximum length of 10 centimetres (3.9 in). Both the exterior and interior are white. It is very similar in appearance to the closely related buttercup lucine (Anodontia alba) which occupies the same range as it in the Caribbean area. The chalky buttercup can be distinguished by the fact that the interior of the valves are white rather than yellow and that the scars formed by the anterior adductor muscles slope at an angle of 30° to the pallial line.

== Distribution and habitat ==
The chalky buttercup is found in both the Caribbean area and in the tropical Indo-Pacific. It is one of a number of bivalve species to be found in the oxygen-depleted sediments among mangroves.

== Biology ==
The chalky buttercup has a symbiotic relationship with certain bacteria that live in its gills. These can oxidise methane and hydrogen sulphide, both of which are found in the low-oxygen, silty sand and mud in which this mollusc burrows. The chalky buttercup uses the energy produced by the bacteria and this enables it to live in an environment that would otherwise be too low in food particles. A similar mutually beneficial arrangement is found among deep-water clams which harbour bacteria that flourish beside the thermal vents where the molluscs live.

== Taxonomy ==
Traditionally this species was known as Lucina philippiana, the name given to it by Reeve in 1850. Some authorities now refer to it as Pegophysema philippiana and Anodontia schrammi is another synonym.
