= Joseph Kinsey =

Joseph Kinsey may refer to:

- Joseph Kinsey (politician)
- Joseph Kinsey (entrepreneur)
