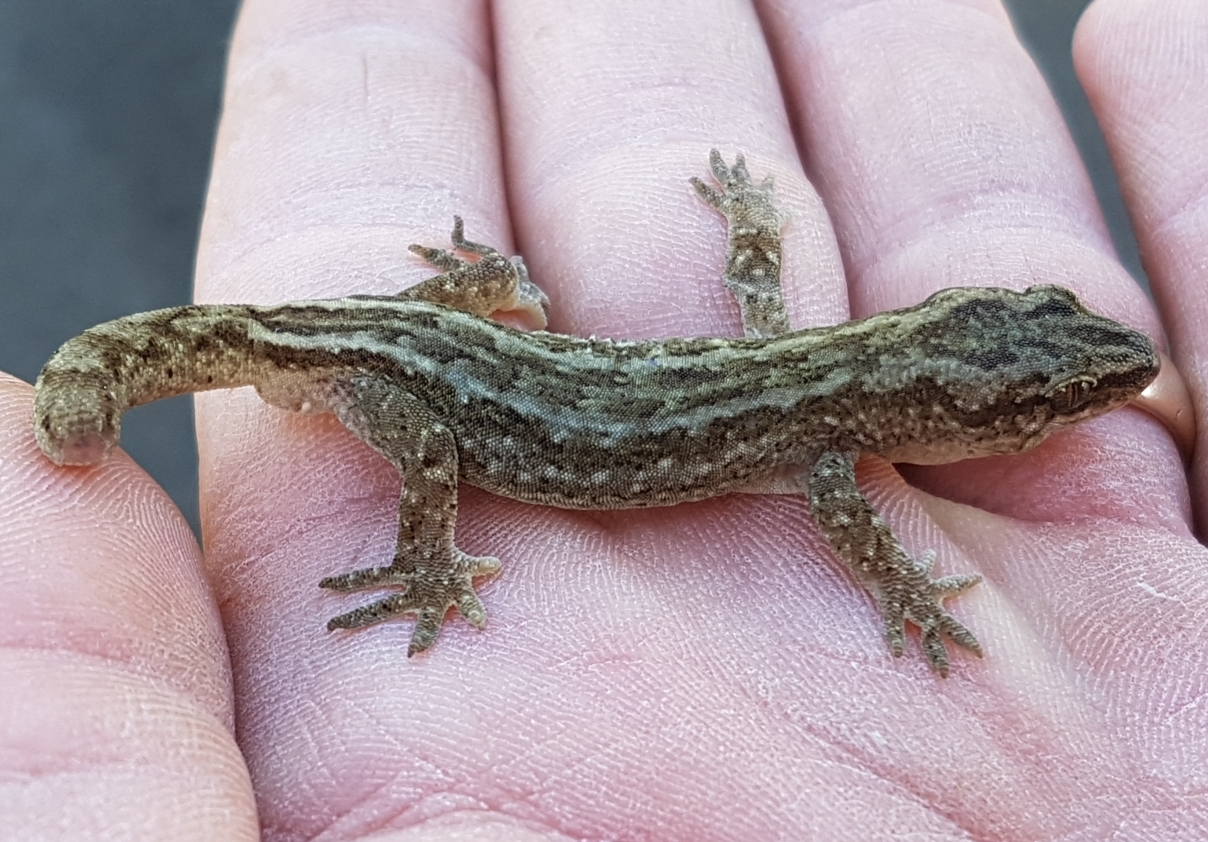

Conservation status
- Nationally Vulnerable (NZ TCS)

Scientific classification
- Domain: Eukaryota
- Kingdom: Animalia
- Phylum: Chordata
- Class: Reptilia
- Order: Squamata
- Infraorder: Gekkota
- Family: Diplodactylidae
- Genus: Woodworthia
- Species: W. korowai

Binomial name
- Woodworthia korowai van Winkel et al., 2023
- Distribution of the korowai gecko on the North Island map Known native range

= Korowai gecko =

Species of lizard

The korowai gecko (Woodworthia korowai), also known as the Muriwai gecko, is a gecko found on the west coast of the Auckland Region of New Zealand. First discovered on Oaia Island in 1954, the species was recognised as distinct from Woodworthia maculata in 2016, and was formally described in 2023. Only 32 individuals are known to exist as of 2023, all within a very restricted range, on Te Korowai-o-Te-Tonga Peninsula, Muriwai Beach, Muriwai Regional Park and Oaia Island.

== Taxonomy ==
Woodworthia geckoes were first identified as living on the west coast of the Auckland Region in 1954 when geckoes were found living on Oaia Island; then identified as Woodworthia maculata. The korowai gecko was first recognised as a distinct species in 2016. It was formally described in 2023, by herpetologists Dylan van Winkel, Sarah Jane Wells, Nicholas Harker and Rod Hitchmough, based on morphological and genetic differences.

The species name was given by Ngāti Whātua o Kaipara, who named the species after their habitat, Te Korowai-o-Te-Tonga Peninsula, and after korowai (traditional cloaks), as their striped patterns are reminiscent of some traditional patterns seen on korowai. The species is most closely related to Woodworthia maculata, and is distinct morphologically and genetically. The scientists who described the korowai gecko estimate the two species diverged in the mid to late Pliocene era. Before the species was formally described, it was referred to as the Muriwai gecko, and in scientific texts Woodworthia aff. maculata "Muriwai".

The holotype was collected by Stephen E. Thorpe in 2003, and is stored at the Auckland War Memorial Museum. This holotype was originally identified as Woodworthia maculata.

== Description ==
The korowai gecko is a grey or sandy brown colour, and has an inverted "v" marking between its eyes, and have lighter stripes on the back halves of their bodies. The species grows to a length of up to 69 millimetres (2.7 in) from its nose to the base of its tail. The species appears to have colour variation based on its habitat, with populations in Muriwai sand dunes appearing more tan, while those living in rocky eastern Oaia Island appearing more grey.

The korowai gecko can be distinguished from Dactylocnemis pacificus due to separation of the nostrils and rostral scale, and from Woodworthia maculata due to having shorter final sections of their legs (distal phalanges).

== Behaviour ==
The species is primarily nocturnal, and can be found sun-basking in daytime close to vegetation. The species typically birth around March or April.

== Geographic distribution and habitat ==
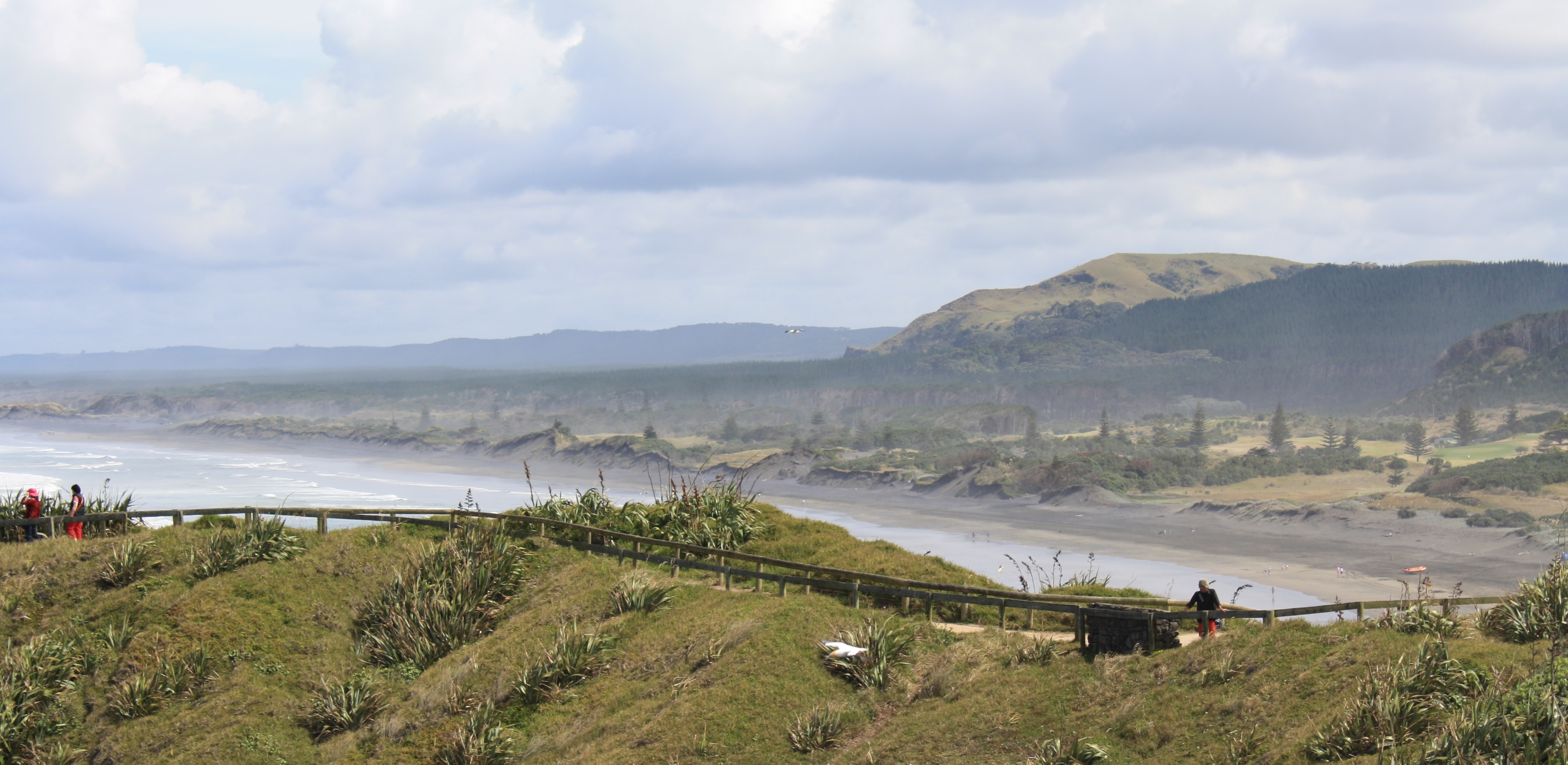
The species has a restricted range, primarily living in sand dunes around Muriwai Beach

As of 2023, only 32 individuals are known to exist, and the species is exclusively found on the west coast of the Auckland Region, New Zealand, at Te Korowai-o-Te-Tonga Peninsula, Muriwai Beach, in Muriwai Regional Park and on Oaia Island. Korowai gecko primarily live in sand dunes, or in rocky areas of Oaia Island. Auckland Council senior ecologist Melinda Rixon is concerned that off-road vehicle access in the gecko's habitat on Muriwai Beach may be adversely affecting the species.

The species is exclusively found on the west coast of the North Island, while Woodworthia maculata is found on the east coast. The two coastal species are likely separated geographically by the Pacific gecko, whose range is primarily inland.

== Conservation ==
As of 2021 the Department of Conservation (DOC) classified the korowai gecko as Threatened - Nationally Vulnerable under the New Zealand Threat Classification System.

== Gallery ==
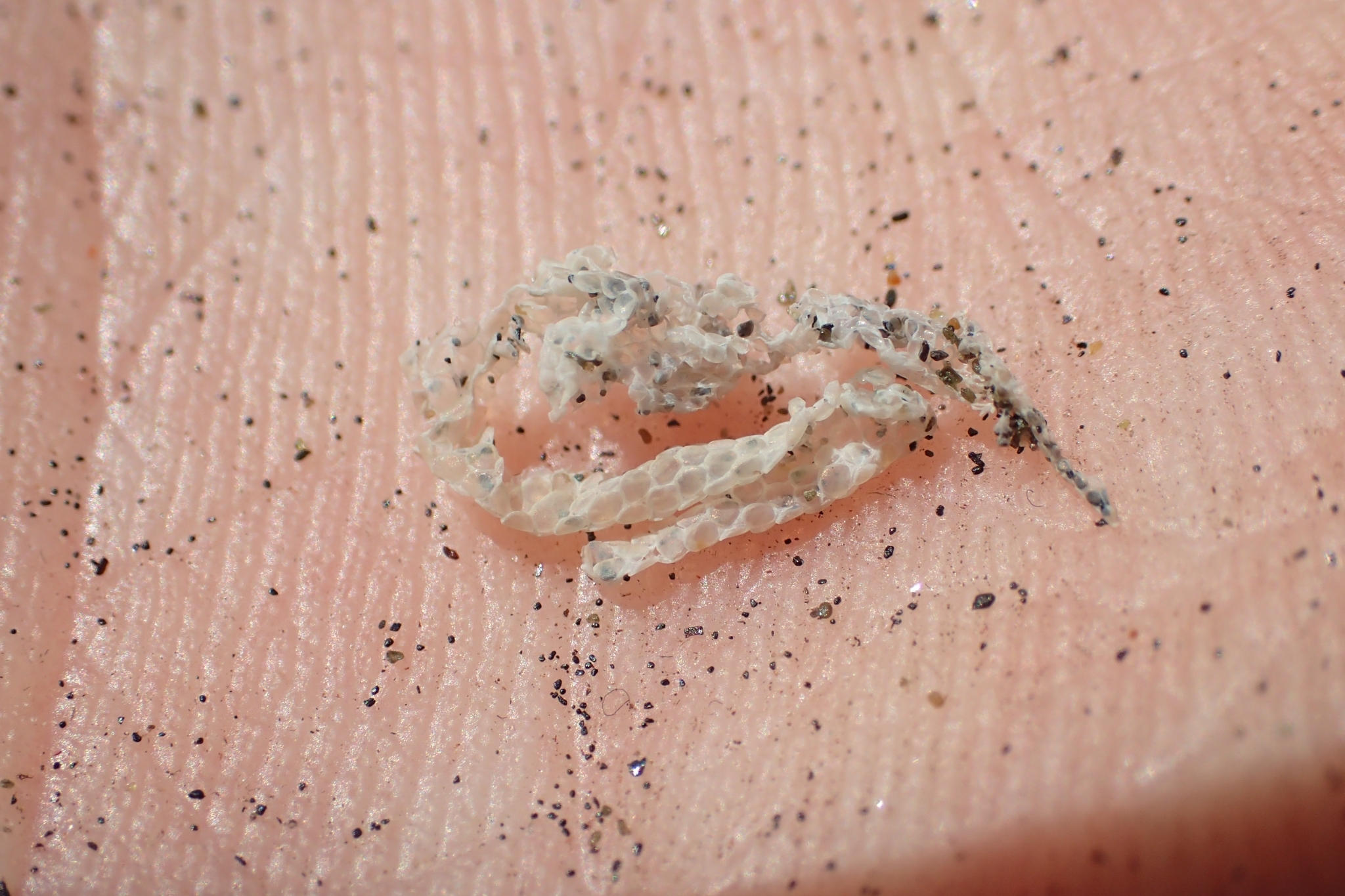
Woodworthia korowai scales found at Muriwai Beach at the base of coastal toetoe (Austroderia splendens)

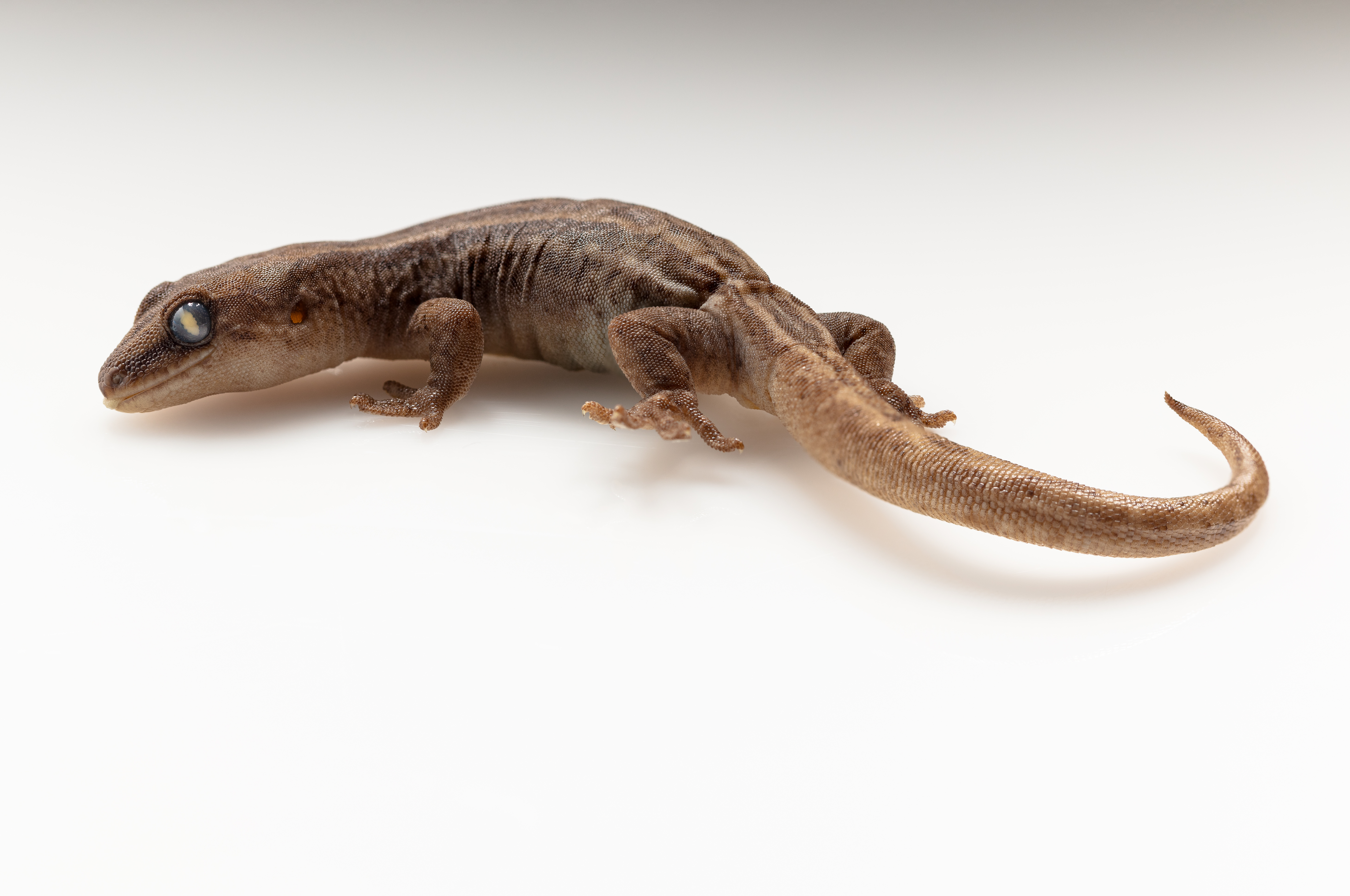
Holotype of the korowai gecko from Auckland War Memorial Museum

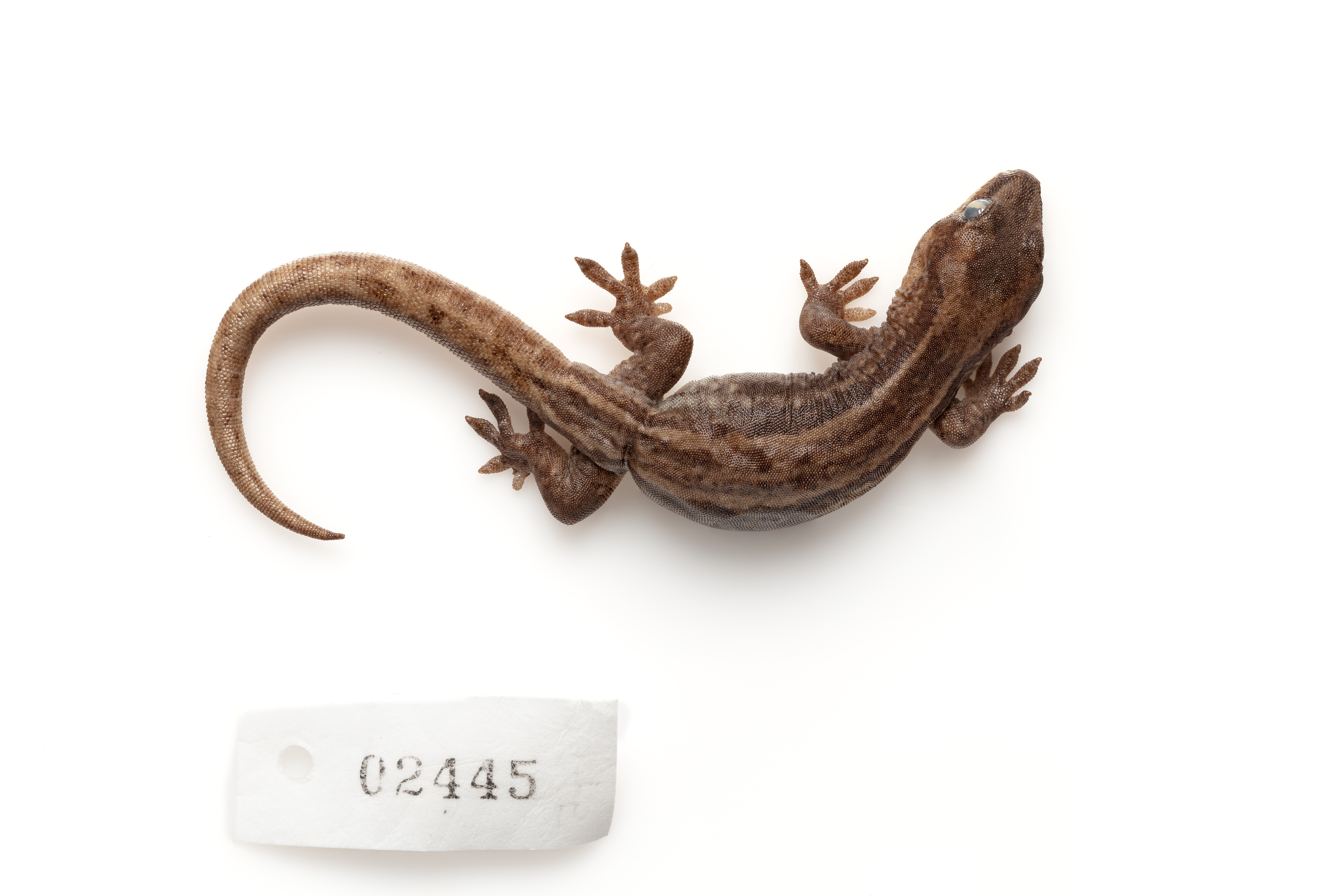
Holotype of the korowai gecko from Auckland War Memorial Museum

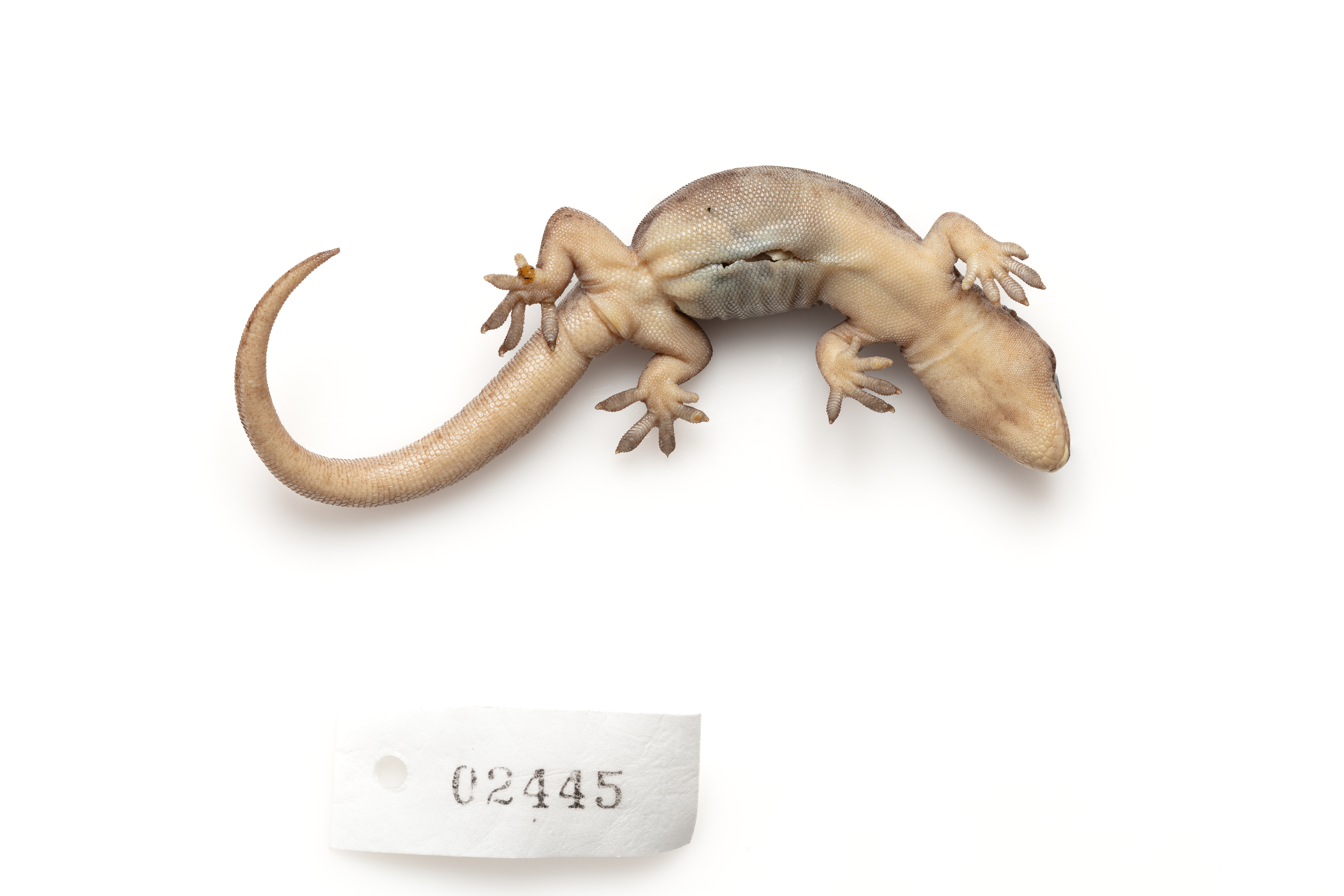
Underside view of the holotype of the korowai gecko from Auckland War Memorial Museum
