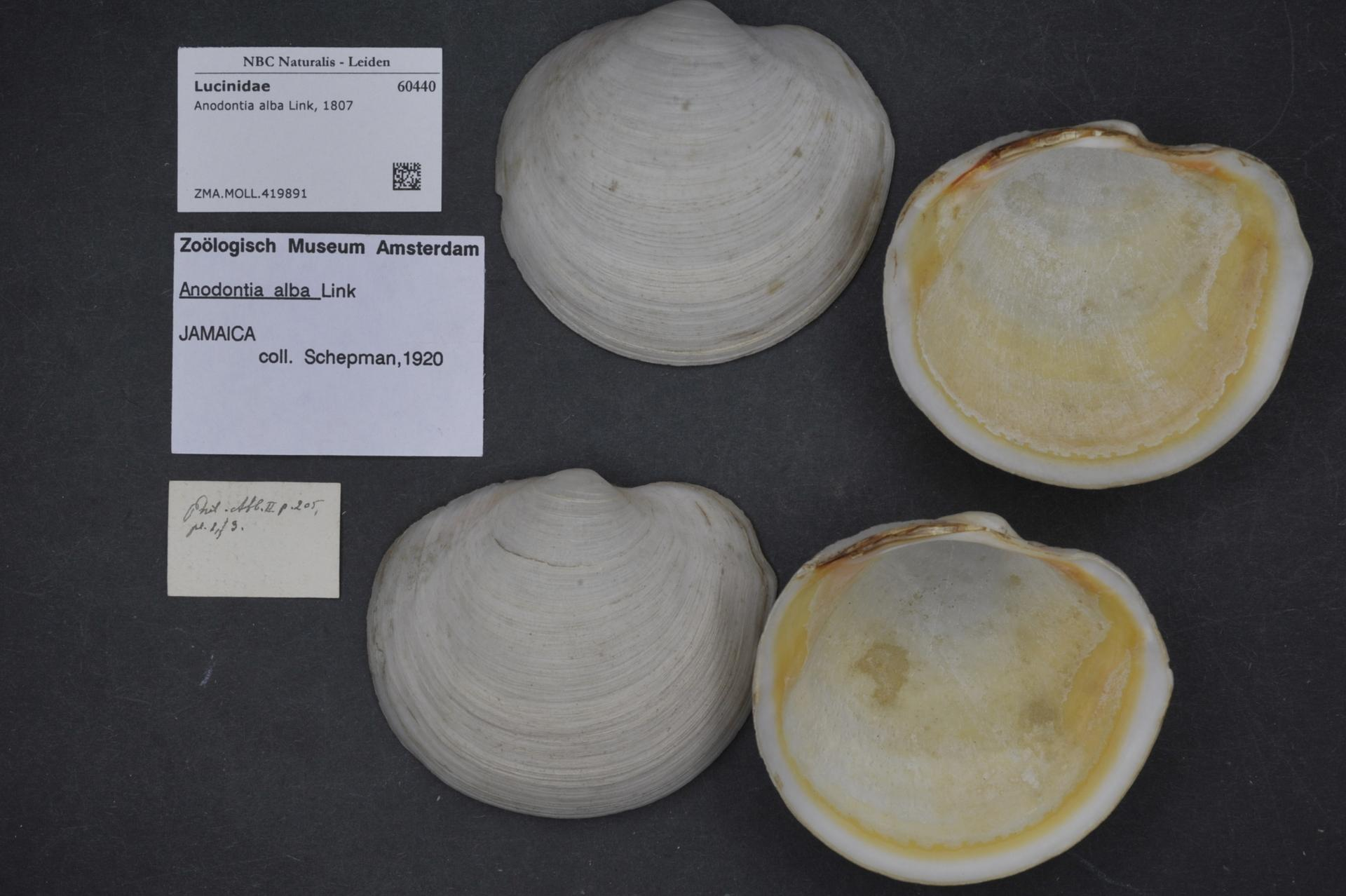
- Anodontia alba shells

Scientific classification
- Kingdom: Animalia
- Phylum: Mollusca
- Class: Bivalvia
- Order: Lucinida
- Superfamily: Lucinoidea
- Family: Lucinidae
- Genus: Anodontia
- Species: A. alba

Binomial name
- Anodontia alba Link, 1807

= Anodontia alba =

Species of bivalve

Anodontia alba, or the buttercup lucine, is a species of bivalve mollusc in the family Lucinidae. It can be found along the Atlantic coast of North America, its range extending from North Carolina in the United States to the West Indies.

== Description ==
Fossil specimen from the Pliocene

The buttercup lucine grows to a length of up to 6 centimetres (2.4 in). It has a pair of equal sized, nearly circular, inflated valves joined at a many-toothed hinge. The exterior is smooth and white and is etched with fine concentric lines running parallel with the margin which show the animal's annual growth stages. The interior of the valves is buttercup yellow. When examining an empty valve, the pallial line (formed by the attachment of the mantle muscles) can be seen running parallel with the margin with the two muscle scars nearer the hinge. These show where the strong adductor muscles that held the valves together were attached. The anterior scar (nearer the animal's head) is parallel with the pallial line, a fact that distinguishes this species from the otherwise similar chalky buttercup (Anodontia philippiana).

== Distribution and habitat ==
The buttercup lucine is found in shallow waters in the western Atlantic and the Caribbean Sea. Its range extends from Bermuda and North Carolina southwards to the Gulf of Mexico and Costa Rica, and eastwards to Barbados.

It burrows in soft sediment to depths of 22 cm (9 in) and is found in lagoons, inlets and bays just below low water mark. It tolerates high salinities and seems to prefer fine-grained or muddy sand.

== Biology ==
The buttercup lucine is a filter feeder, drawing water into its mantle cavity through a long siphon that extends to the surface of the sediment. The water passes over its gills where both oxygen and food particles are extracted and is expelled through another siphon. These molluscs are eaten by fish, crustaceans and birds.

The buttercup lucine becomes sexually mature at a length of about 1.7 cm (0.7 in). Spawning takes place all year round in Florida with peaks of activity in mid winter and mid summer. As in other bivalve molluscs, gametes are liberated into the sea and fertilisation is external. The eggs hatch into planktonic trochophore larvae which later develop into veliger larvae. After a period of further development, these settle on the seabed and undergo metamorphosis into juveniles.
