= Ōkiritoto Stream =

Ōkiritoto Stream Muriwai Stream
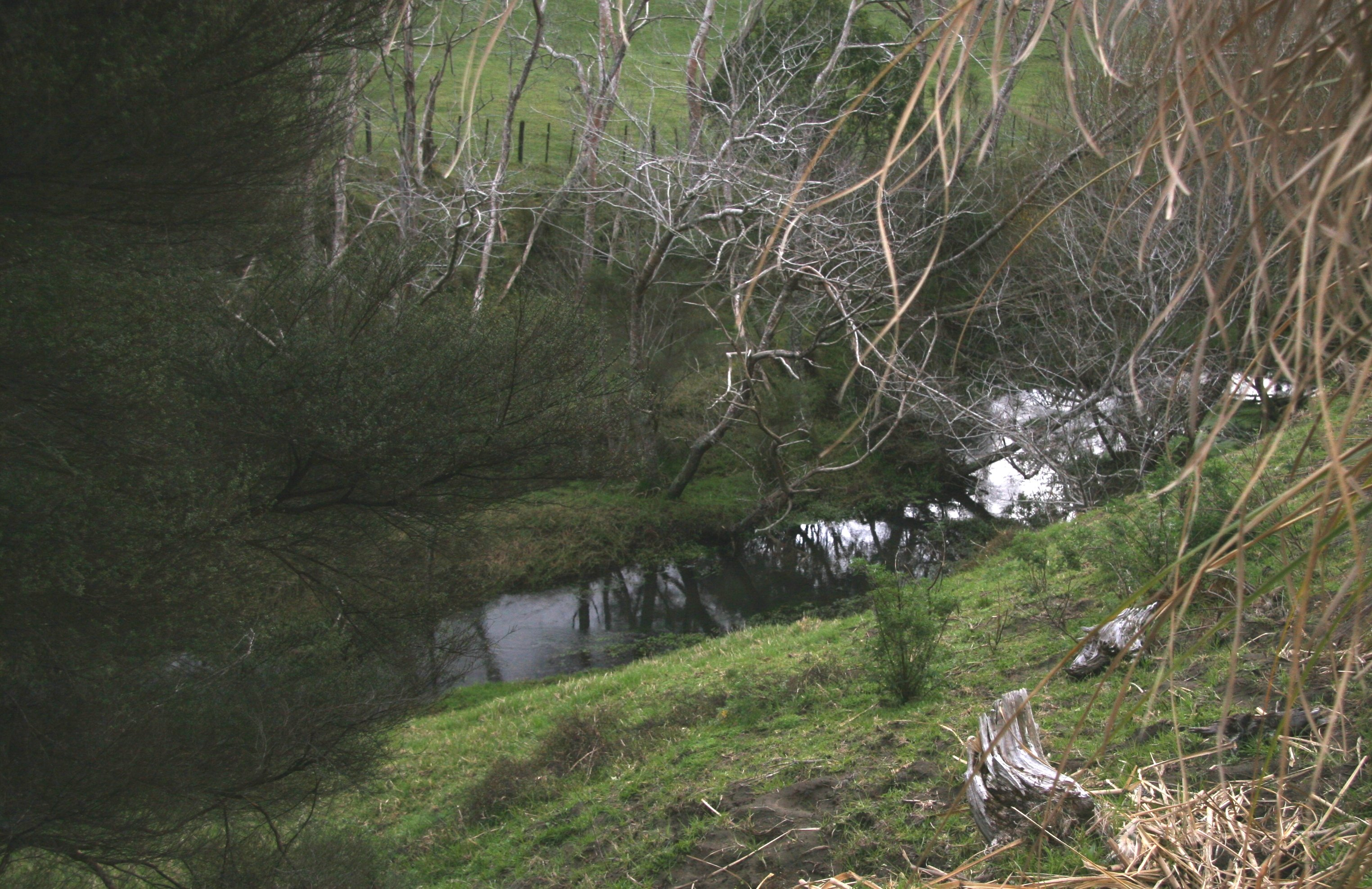
- The Ōkiritoto Stream in 2009

- Mouth of Ōkiritoto Stream Ōkiritoto Stream (New Zealand)
- Route of the Ōkiritoto Stream
- Native name: Waimanu Awa

Location
- Country: New Zealand
- Region: Auckland Region

Physical characteristics
- Source: Muriwai
  - coordinates: 36.8227°S 174.444°E
- Mouth: Tasman Sea
  - coordinates: 36.8071°S 174.4121°E

Basin features
- Progression: Ōkiritoto Stream → Tasman Sea
- Landmarks: Muriwai
- Tributaries
  - right: Raurataua Stream
- Waterfalls: Ōkiritoto Falls, Toroanui Falls

Ōkiritoto Stream, also known as the Muriwai Stream, is a stream of the Auckland Region of New Zealand's North Island. The stream originates to the east of Muriwai, and flows in a circular anti-clockwise direction, flowing into Muriwai Beach at Muriwai Regional Park north of the Muriwai Golf Course. The stream is home to two waterfalls, the Okiritoto Falls and the Toroanui Falls.

== Geography ==
The stream begins at a point to the east of Muriwai near Coster Road, flowing northeast into rural Rodney District, where is meets the Rauratawa Stream. At this point the stream begins to flow westwards, flowing towards Muriwai Beach. Along this strip are two waterfalls, the Ōkiritoto Falls, and the Toroanui Falls. The lower Ōkiritoto Stream becomes a wetland, reaching Muriwai Beach just to the north of the Muriwai Golf Course.

== History ==
The stream was traditionally known by Te Kawerau ā Maki as Waimanu, and was used as a location for hauling waka by the occupants of Te Muriwai, a kāinga located on the stream. The name of the village eventually was adopted as the name for the river valley, and eventually for the wider Muriwai area. The area surrounding the mouth of the stream was traditionally known as Paengatohora, a name referencing the numerous whale strandings which have occurred here.

After peace was forged between Te Kawerau ā Maki and Te Taoū (Ngāti Whātua) in the 18th century, a peace marriage was formed between Te Waitaheke, a rangatira of Te Taoū, and Te Kahupara, a high ranking woman of Te Kawerau ā Maki. Their union led to the creation of the hapū Ngāti Te Kahupara, a group who had ties to both Ngāti Whātua and Te Kawerau ā Maki. Ngāti Te Kahupara's settlement focused in the Muriwai area, and a kāinga (village) called Oneonenui was constructed near the Ōkiritoto Falls. The stream was likely used by Tāmaki Māori to harvest flax and collect freshwater fish and shellfish species such as eels, īnanga, kōkopu and kākahi.

In 1870, John and Annie Foster established a flax mill on the southern bank of the Ōkiritoto Stream near the Ōkiritoto Falls. Flax from throughout the Muriwai area was processed here, until the mill was destroyed in a fire. In 1912 a guesthouse was established at Muriwai Beach, and guests would often enjoy recreational activities around the Ōkiritoto Stream.

Numerous whale strandings have occurred near the stream mouth in the late 19th and early 20th centuries.

In 2009, a waka made from kauri wood was discovered in the stream.

== See also ==
- List of rivers of New Zealand
