= Donald McGavin =

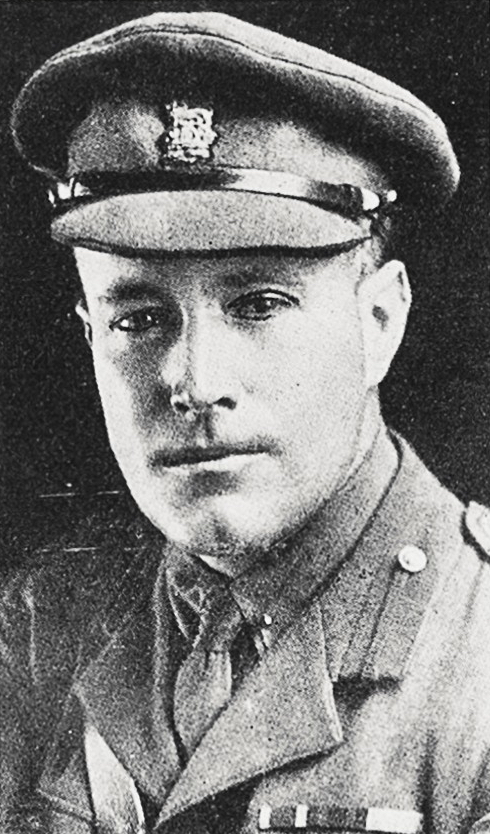
Donald McGavin

Major General Sir Donald Johnstone McGavin CMG DSO CStJ (19 August 1876 – 8 May 1960) was a New Zealand surgeon, army health administrator and medical administrator.

== Early life and education ==
McGavin was born in Chatham, Kent, England. He trained at Mason University College in Birmingham and London Hospital qualifying with an MB in 1900 as a Doctor of Medicine in 1901.

== Career ==
McGavin joined the Royal Army Medical Corps as a civilian surgeon, serving in Natal during the Boer War. He then moved to New Zealand, registering in 1903 and starting practice as a surgeon in Wellington in 1904. In 1902 he joined the New Zealand Medical Corps becoming a volunteer medical officer with the No 5 Company, New Zealand Field Hospital and Bearer Corps.

In World War I he was in active service in the New Zealand Expeditionary Force from 1915 at No 1 New Zealand Stationary Hospital in Egypt, Greece and France. He served at Gallipoli, on the Western Front, in particular at Messines, Passchendaele, Bapaume and St Quentin-Cambrai.Le Quesnoy

Following the war, he served as Director-General of Medical Services from 1919 to 1924, and as a medical advisor to the Minister of Defence during World War II. In 1924 he took up an honorary surgical position at Wellington Hospital.

McGavin held a number of other positions: honorary surgeon to the Governor General, member of the Prisons Board and the War Pensions Medical Appeal Board, member of commissions on venereal disease and mental health, chair of the New Zealand Branch of the British Medical Association, chair of the New Zealand Medical Council and surgeon in chief to the St John Ambulance Brigade.

== Honours and awards ==
In the 1919 New Year Honours, McGavin was made an additional Companion of the Order of St Michael and St George. He was appointed a Knight Bachelor in the 1921 King's Birthday Honours, the first knighthood awarded for medical services. In 1935, he was awarded the King George V Silver Jubilee Medal. In 1946 he was appointed as a Commander of the Order of St John.

== Personal life ==
McGavin married Mary Allan Chapple in 1903. They had one son Dr Donald B. McGavin who was a surgeon in Leicester, England. McGavin lived in a house designed by architect William Page in Oriental Bay.

McGavin died in Wellington on 8 May 1960.
