= Edwin Mitchelson =

New Zealand politician

The Honourable Sir Edwin Mitchelson KCMG
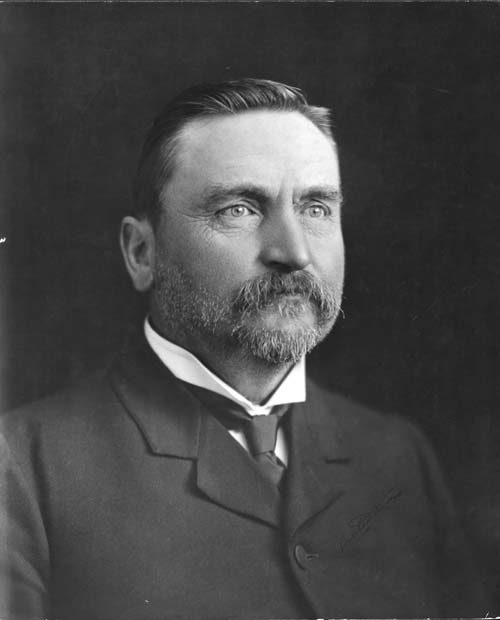

19th Mayor of Auckland City
- In office 13 May 1903 – 3 May 1905
- Preceded by: Alfred Kidd
- Succeeded by: Arthur Myers

15th Minister of Native Affairs
- In office 11 October 1887 – 24 January 1891
- Prime Minister: Harry Atkinson
- Preceded by: John Ballance
- Succeeded by: John Ballance

Personal details
- Born: 7 April 1846 Auckland, New Zealand
- Died: 11 April 1934 (aged 88) Auckland, New Zealand

Sir Edwin Mitchelson KCMG (7 April 1846 – 11 April 1934) was a New Zealand politician and timber merchant.

== Member of Parliament ==
New Zealand Parliament
Years	Term	Electorate	Party
1881–1884	8th	Marsden	Independent
1884–1887	9th	Marsden	Independent
1887–1890	10th	Eden	Independent
1890–1893	11th	Eden	Conservative
1893–1896	12th	Eden	Conservative

Mitchelson was born in Auckland in a cottage on Queen Street in the mid 1840s. He developed business interests in timber and kauri gum, shipbuilding, and horse racing and breeding. He was a cabinet minister from 1883 to 1884 and 1887 to 1880 as Minister of Public Works. From 1887 to 1891 he was Minister of Māori Affairs (called Native Affairs), and from 1889 to 1891 he was Minister of Telegraphs and Postmaster-General.

He represented the Marsden electorate from 1881 to 1887, then Eden from 1887 to 1896, when he was defeated (for the City of Auckland electorate).

== Later years ==
Mitchelson was the Mayor of Auckland City from 1903 to 1905, chairman of the Remuera Road Board, and a member of the Legislative Council from 1920 until his death on 11 April 1934. He was appointed a Knight Commander of the Order of St Michael and St George in the 1921 King's Birthday Honours. He was buried at Purewa Cemetery in the Auckland suburb of Meadowbank.

== Personal life ==
Mitchelson had a wooden mansion built at Muriwai around the year 1902, which he named Oaia, named after Oaia Island. In 1935, Arthur William Baden Powell named the fossil species Bathytoma mitchelsoni in honour of Mitchelson, as the holotype of the species had been found in deposits on Mitchelson's Muriwai property.

== Notes ==
New Zealand Parliament
Preceded by William Colbeck	Member of Parliament for Marsden; 1881–1887	Succeeded by Robert Thompson
Preceded by Joseph Tole	Member of Parliament for Eden; 1887–1896	Succeeded by John Bollard
Political offices
Preceded by Harry Atkinson	Postmaster-General; 1889–1891	Succeeded by Patrick Buckley
Preceded by Harry Atkinson	Commissioner of Telegraphs; 1889–1891	Position abolished
Preceded by Alfred Kidd	Mayor of Auckland City; 1903–1905	Succeeded by Arthur Myers
