= Worley Edwards =

New Zealand lawyer and judge

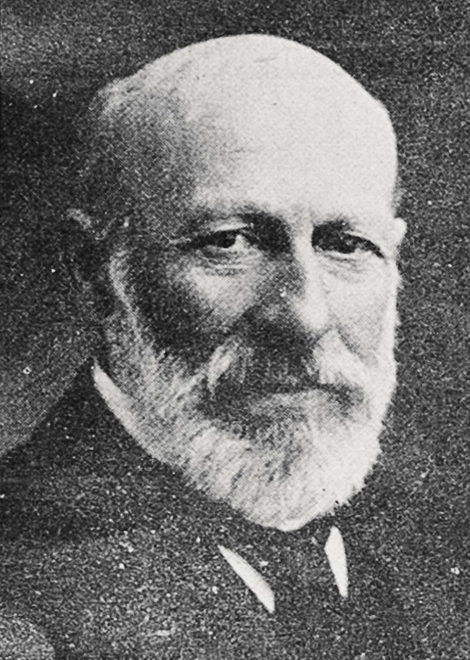
Worley Edwards

Sir Worley Bassett Edwards (5 September 1850 – 1 June 1927) was a New Zealand lawyer and judge.

Edwards was born in London, England, the son of Charles Scatcherd Wilson Edwards and his wife Cornelia Allen (Waller). He went to the Otago region, New Zealand, with his parents in 1856. Having embraced the practice of the law, he gained a leading position in the profession, and was appointed a judge of the native land court, with the position of a puisne judge of the Supreme Court of New Zealand, in 1890 by the Atkins Government. When the Ballance Cabinet came into power in 1891, they disputed the appointment as ultra vires, but the New Zealand Court of Appeal decided that the nomination was valid. The case was carried to the Privy Council, and in May 1892 the Judicial Committee gave a decision adverse to the legality of the appointment, on the ground that Parliament had not previously been asked to provide Judge Edwards's salary.

Edwards married Mary A. Cutten at Wellington in June 1886. He was knighted in the 1919 New Year Honours.
