= 1919 New Year Honours (New Zealand) =

Annual awards for New Zealanders

The 1919 New Year Honours in New Zealand were appointments by King George V on the advice of the New Zealand government to various orders and honours to reward and highlight good works by New Zealanders. The awards celebrated the passing of 1918 and the beginning of 1919, and were announced on 1 January 1919.

The recipients of honours are displayed here as they were styled before their new honour.

== Knight Bachelor ==
- The Honourable Worley Bassett Edwards – senior judge of the Supreme Court. For long and valuable services in the capacity of judge to which office he was appointed in 1896.
- Joseph James Kinsey – of Christchurch. For special services rendered in connection with the various Antarctic expeditions.
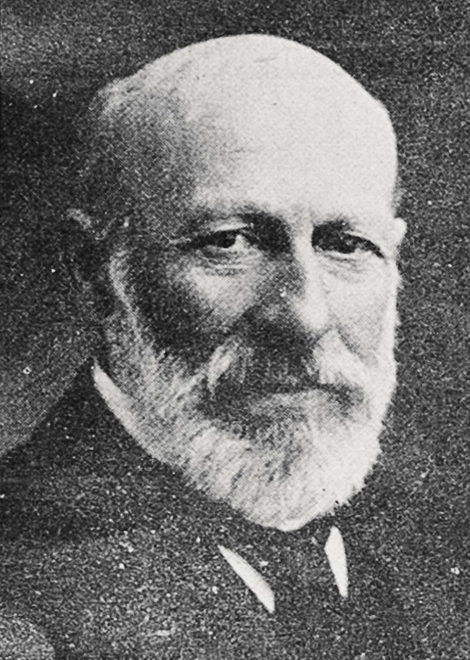
Sir Worley Edwards

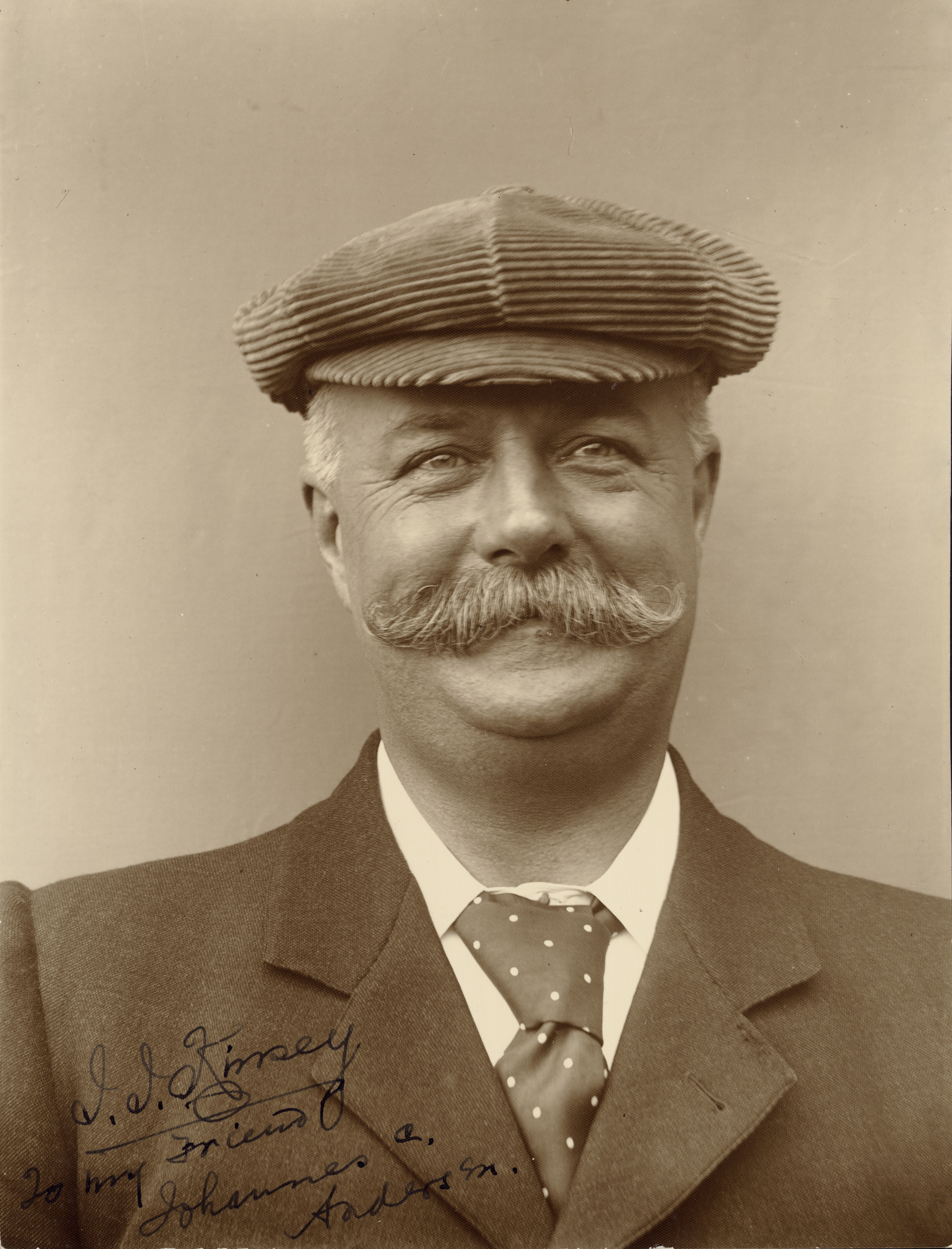
Sir Joseph Kinsey

== Order of Saint Michael and Saint George ==
=== Companion (CMG) ===
Ordinary

- Colonel George Frederick Colin Campbell VD – secretary to the Treasury, receiver-general and paymaster-general.
- William Russell Morris ISO – secretary, Post and Telegraph Department.

Additional

- Colonel Donald Johnstone McGavin DSO FRCS – New Zealand Medical Corps.
- Lieutenant-Colonel Donald Norman Watson Murray DSO – New Zealand Medical Corps.
- Colonel Eugene Joseph O'Neill DSO FRCS – New Zealand Medical Corps.
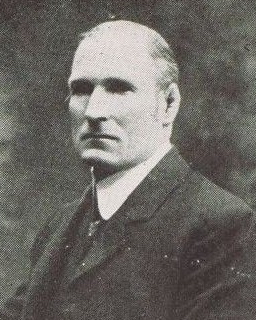
George Campbell

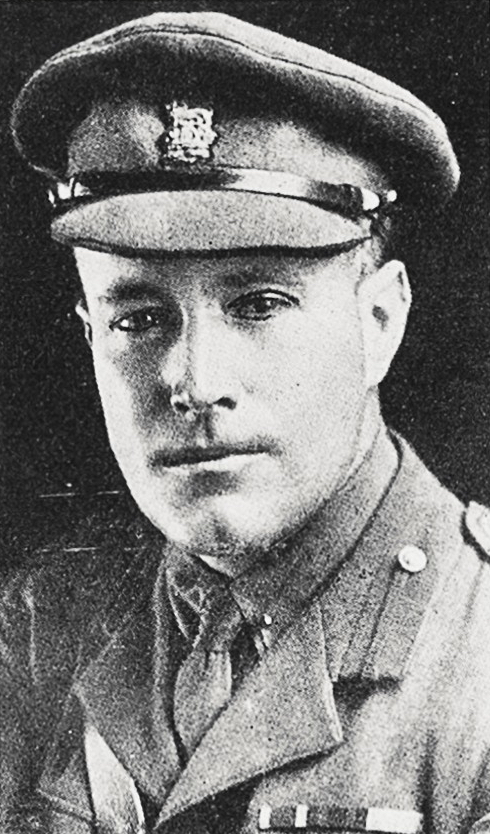
Donald McGavin

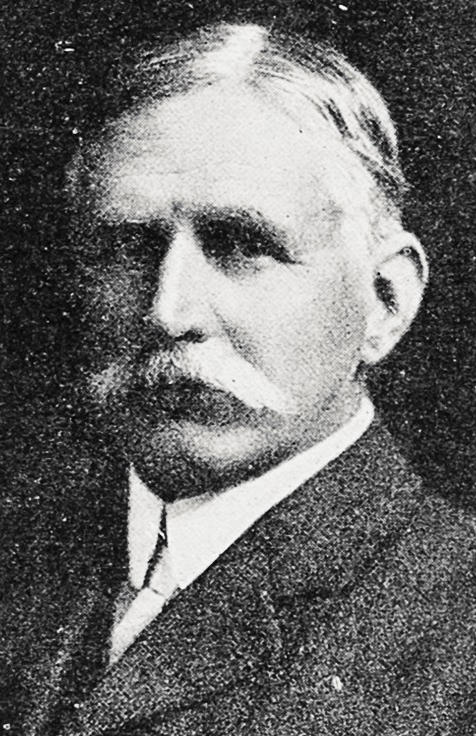
William Morris

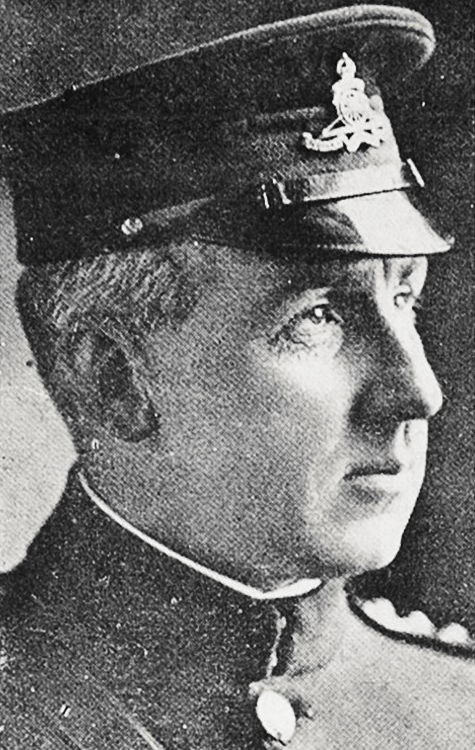
Donald Murray

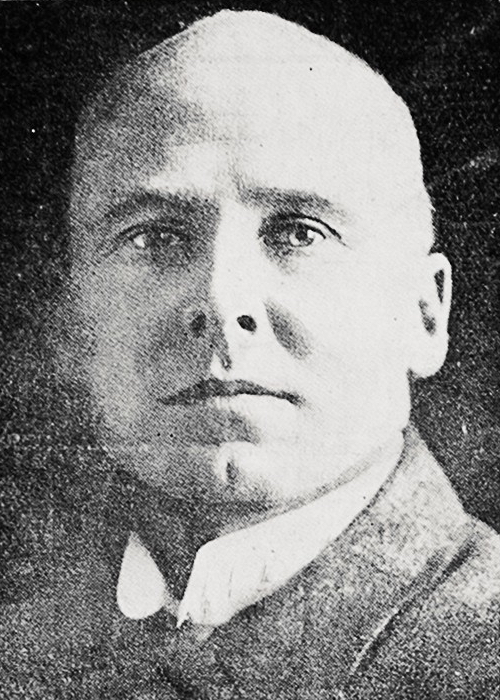
Eugene O'Neill

== Order of the British Empire ==
=== Commander (CBE) ===
Military division

- Major (Temporary Lieutenant-Colonel) William Marshall Macdonald MB – New Zealand Medical Corps.
- Lieutenant-Colonel Henry John McLean MD FRCS – New Zealand Medical Corps.
- Lieutenant-Colonel (Temporary Brigadier-General) George Spafford Richardson CB CMG – New Zealand Staff Corps.
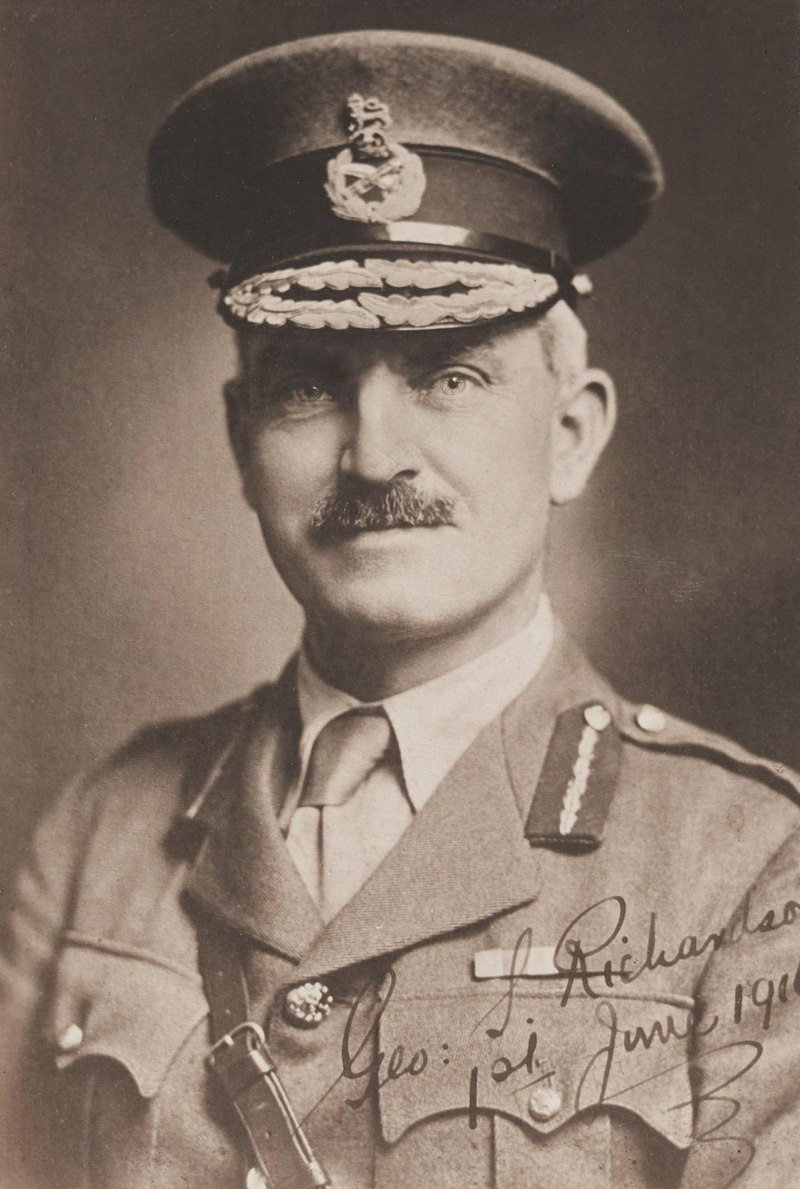
George Richardson

=== Officer (OBE) ===
Military division

- Major Percy de Bathe Brandon – New Zealand Army Pay Corps.
- Major Andrew Seymour Brewis – New Zealand Medical Corps.
- Major William Bruce – New Zealand Medical Corps.
- Captain Frank Lawton Hindley – Canterbury Mounted Rifles.
- Major Raymond Alexander Reid Lawry – Canterbury Regiment.
- Major Frank Woolmer Parker – New Zealand Army Service Corps.
- Captain Richard Errol Wardell Riddiford MC – Wellington Regiment.
- Major Louis Murray Shera MC – New Zealand Engineers.
- Lieutenant Alexander Watchlin – Royal Naval Reserve (New Zealand).

=== Member (MBE) ===
Military division

- Quartermaster and Captain Henry Eastgate – New Zealand Rifle Brigade.
- Captain Gordon Harris Forsythe – New Zealand Field Artillery.
- Captain Norman Joseph Levien – New Zealand Army Ordnance Corps.
- Captain Christopher Robert Alexander Magnay – New Zealand Rifle Brigade.
- Captain Donald Archibald McCurdy – New Zealand Army Postal Service.
- Captain Henry Edward McGowan – Canterbury Regiment.
- Quartermaster and Captain Richard Charles Staples-Brown – New Zealand Medical Corps.

== Companion of the Distinguished Service Order (DSO) ==
- Lieutenant-Colonel George Craig – No. 1 New Zealand Field Ambulance, New Zealand Medical Corps.
- Captain Alexander Smith Falconer MC – Otago Regiment.
- Major William Ivan Kirke Jennings – New Zealand Machine Gun Corps.
- Major Robert Gracie Milligan – 15th Battery, 1st Brigade, New Zealand Field Artillery.
- Lieutenant-Colonel Norman Francis Shepherd – New Zealand Rifle Brigade.
- Major Clive Sommerville – 12th Battery, 3rd Brigade, New Zealand Field Artillery.
- Major Newman Robert Wilson MC – 2nd Battalion, Canterbury Regiment.
- Major Robert Adams Wilson – 6th Battery, 2nd Army Brigade, New Zealand Field Artillery (attached from Royal Garrison Artillery).
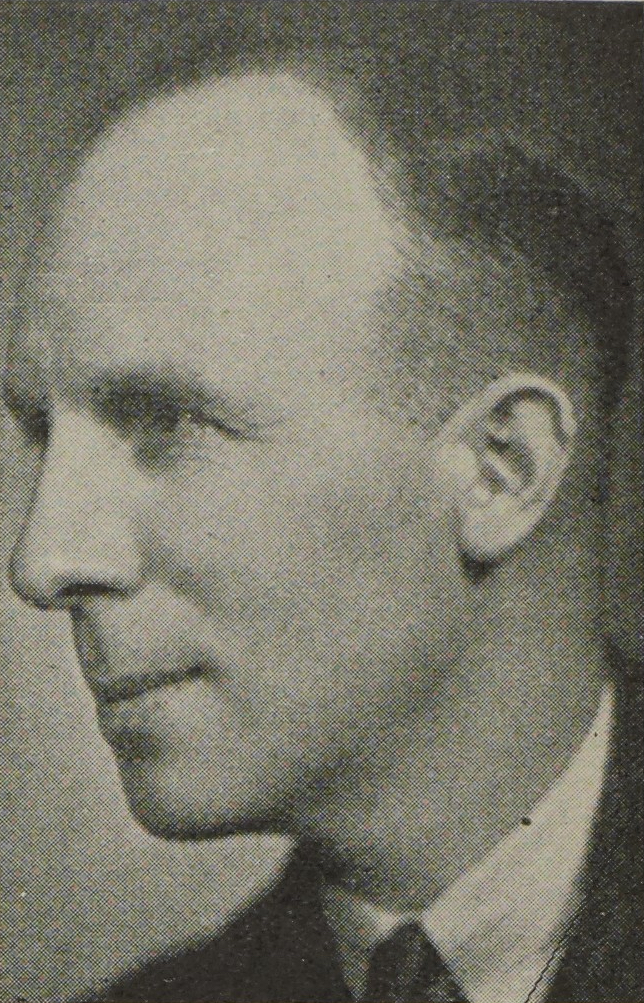
Alexander Falconer

== Royal Red Cross ==
=== Associate (ARRC) ===
- Maude Gertrude Atkinson – sister, New Zealand Army Nursing Service.
- Blanche Marion Huddleston – sister, New Zealand Army Nursing Service.

== Military Cross (MC) ==
- Lieutenant Erasmus Baxter – 1st New Zealand Rifle Brigade.
- 2nd Lieutenant Arthur William Brown DCM – New Zealand Machine Gun Corps.
- Captain Robert Henry Daldy – New Zealand Engineers.
- Captain Norman Harrison Dempster MB – New Zealand Medical Corps (attached 3rd Battalion, New Zealand Rifle Brigade).
- Captain Alexander Cameron Monteith Finlayson – Auckland Mounted Rifles Regiment.
- The Reverend David Craig Herron – New Zealand Chaplains' Department (attached 2nd Otago Regiment).
- Captain Maurice George Robert Newbould – 1st Field Company, New Zealand Engineers.
- Lieutenant Sinclair Chapman Reid – Auckland Mounted Rifles Regiment.
- Captain Arthur Ernest Timaru Rhodes – Canterbury Mounted Rifles.
- Lieutenant Robert Sutherland – Wellington Mounted Rifles Regiment.
- Captain Edward Tingey – New Zealand (Māori) Pioneer Battalion.
- The Reverend Charles Walls – New Zealand Chaplains' Department (attached 2nd Battalion, Wellington Regiment).
- Captain Alexander Duncan Shanks Whyte – New Zealand Medical Corps (attached 2nd Brigade Headquarters, New Zealand Field Artillery).
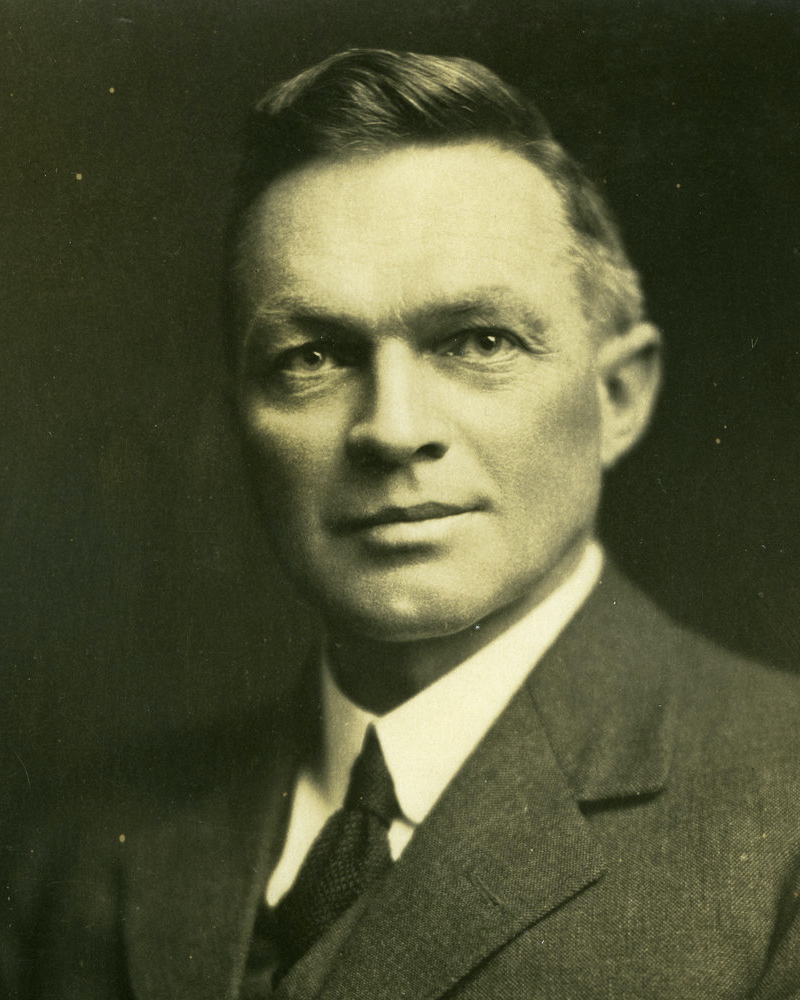
David Herron

== Distinguished Conduct Medal (DCM) ==
- Sergeant Francis Barclay – New Zealand (Māori) Pioneer Battalion.
- Sergeant Archer Ian Batty – 2nd Battalion, 3rd New Zealand Rifle Brigade.
- Sergeant Lawrence Burrows – Canterbury Mounted Rifles Regiment.
- Sergeant Francis Henry Clifford – New Zealand Tunnelling Company, New Zealand Engineers.
- Corporal Arthur Dunlop – 2nd Battalion, Otago Regiment.
- Sergeant William Laughton Free – 1st Battalion, 3rd New Zealand Rifle Brigade.
- Sergeant George Hatch – New Zealand Tunnelling Company, New Zealand Engineers.
- Battery Sergeant-Major John Patrick Joyce – 6th Battery, 2nd Army Brigade, New Zealand Field Artillery.
- Corporal Edwin Kelly – 2nd Battalion, Canterbury Regiment.
- Sapper Kenneth Bruce McLean – New Zealand Tunnelling Company, New Zealand Engineers.
- Sergeant Arthur Charles Mills – 1st Battalion, Otago Regiment.
- Sergeant Thomas Muir – 2nd Battalion, Wellington Regiment.
- Sergeant William Alfred Proctor – 2nd Battalion, Auckland Regiment.
- Private Frederick Andrew Stade – New Zealand Machine Gun Corps.
- Sergeant John Tannahill – 1st Battalion, Wellington Regiment.
- Sergeant Norbert Boland Thompson – 1st Battalion, Canterbury Regiment.
- Sergeant Leslie Tribe – 1st Battalion, Auckland Regiment.
- Sergeant Charles Robert Cowie Wilson – 1st Battalion, 3rd New Zealand Rifle Brigade.

== Meritorious Service Medal ==
- Sergeant Michael Edward Rafter – New Zealand Army Postal Service.
- Sergeant (Temporary Company Sergeant-Major) George Henry Burgess Sleight – New Zealand Medical Corps.
