= 1921 Birthday Honours (New Zealand) =

Awards list for New Zealand

The 1921 King's Birthday Honours in New Zealand, celebrating the official birthday of King George V, were appointments made by the King on the recommendation of the New Zealand government to various orders and honours to reward and highlight good works by New Zealanders. They were announced on 3 June 1921.

The recipients of honours are displayed here as they were styled before their new honour.

== Knight Bachelor ==
- John Pearce Luke CMG MP – member of the House of Representatives, and formerly mayor of the City of Wellington.
- Brigadier-General Donald Johnstone McGavin CMG DSO MD – director-general of medical services, New Zealand Military Forces.
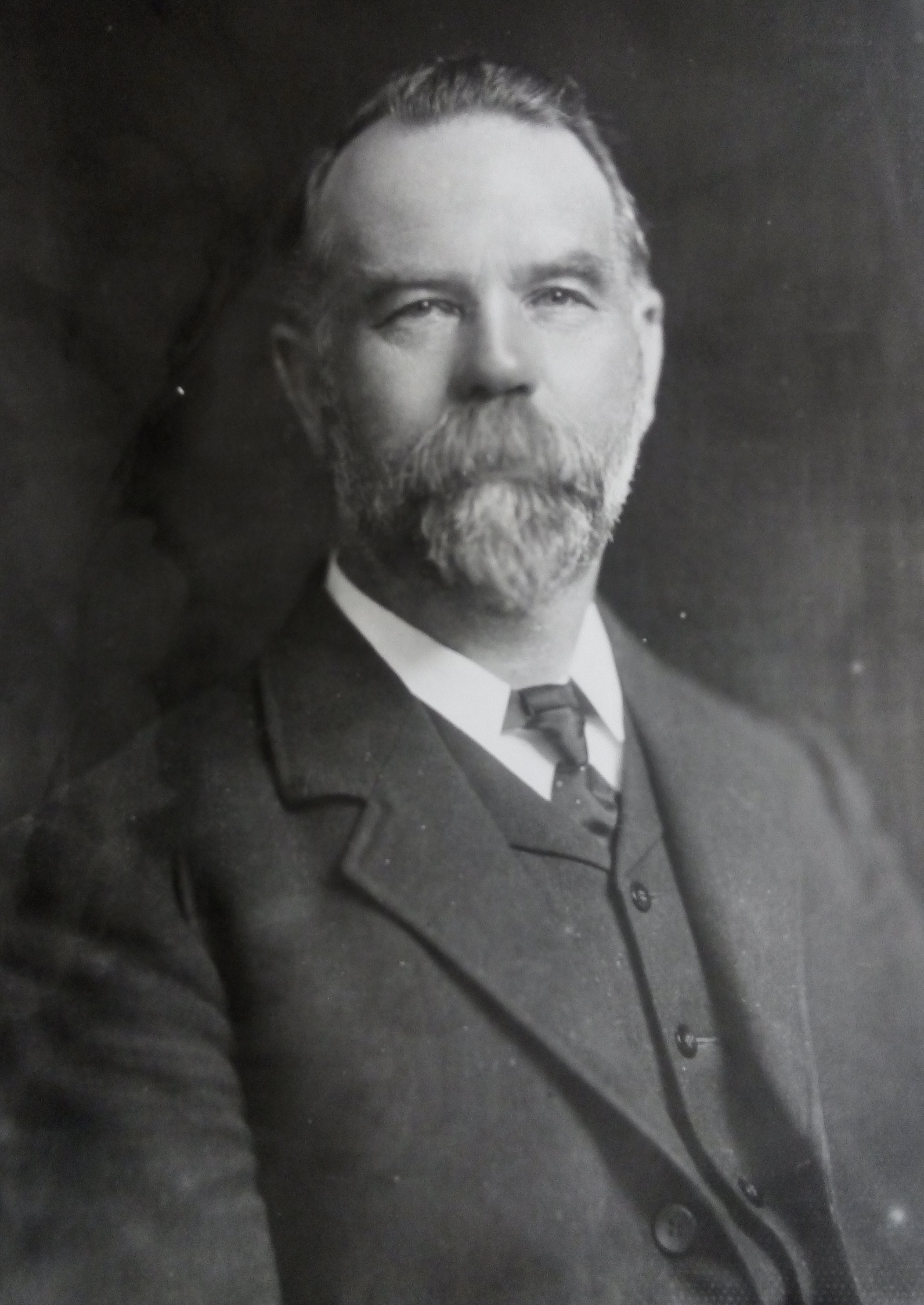
Sir John Luke

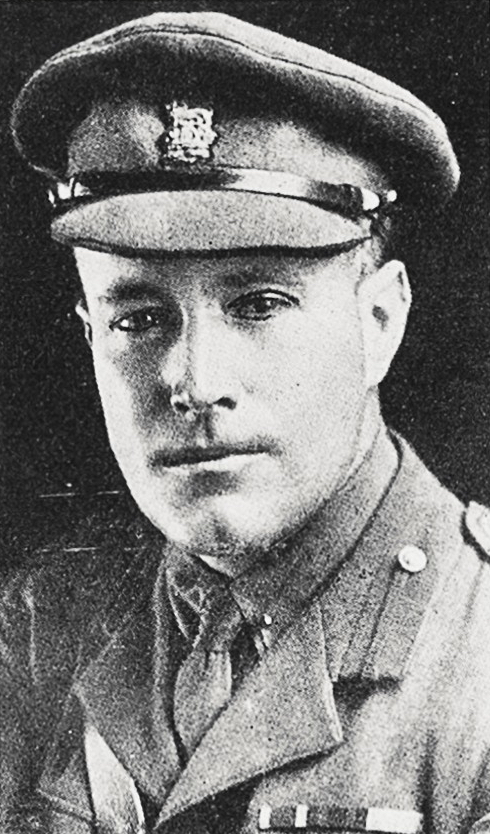
Sir Donald McGavin

== Order of Saint Michael and Saint George ==
=== Knight Commander (KCMG) ===
- The Honourable Edwin Mitchelson MLC – member of the Legislative Council.
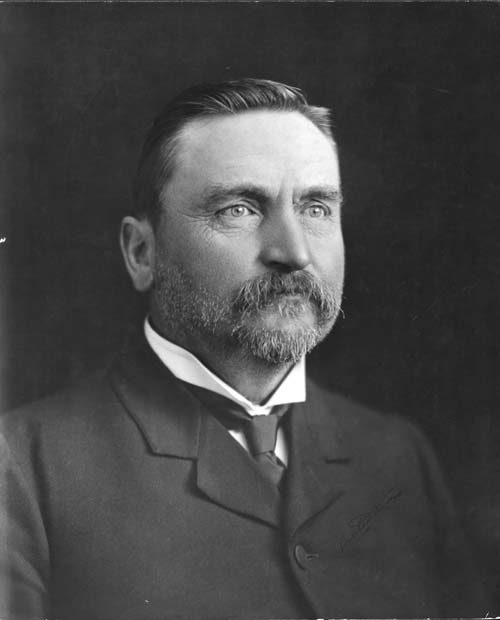
Sir Edward Mitchelson

=== Companion (CMG) ===
- Frederick William Platts — of Te Kūiti; stipendiary magistrate, and formerly resident commissioner of the Cook Islands.
- Major James Lewis Sleeman CBE MVO. In recognition of services as director of military training, New Zealand Military Forces.
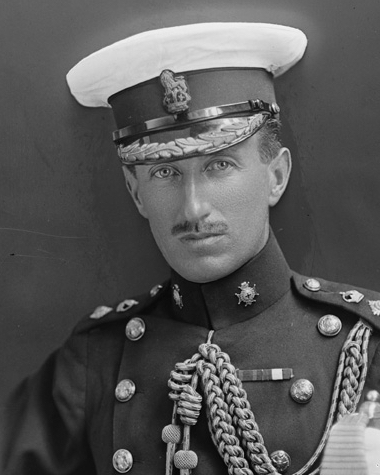
James Sleeman
