= Joseph Kinsey (entrepreneur) =

Christchurch businessman, collector and Antarctic enthusiast (1852–1936)

Sir Joseph Kinsey
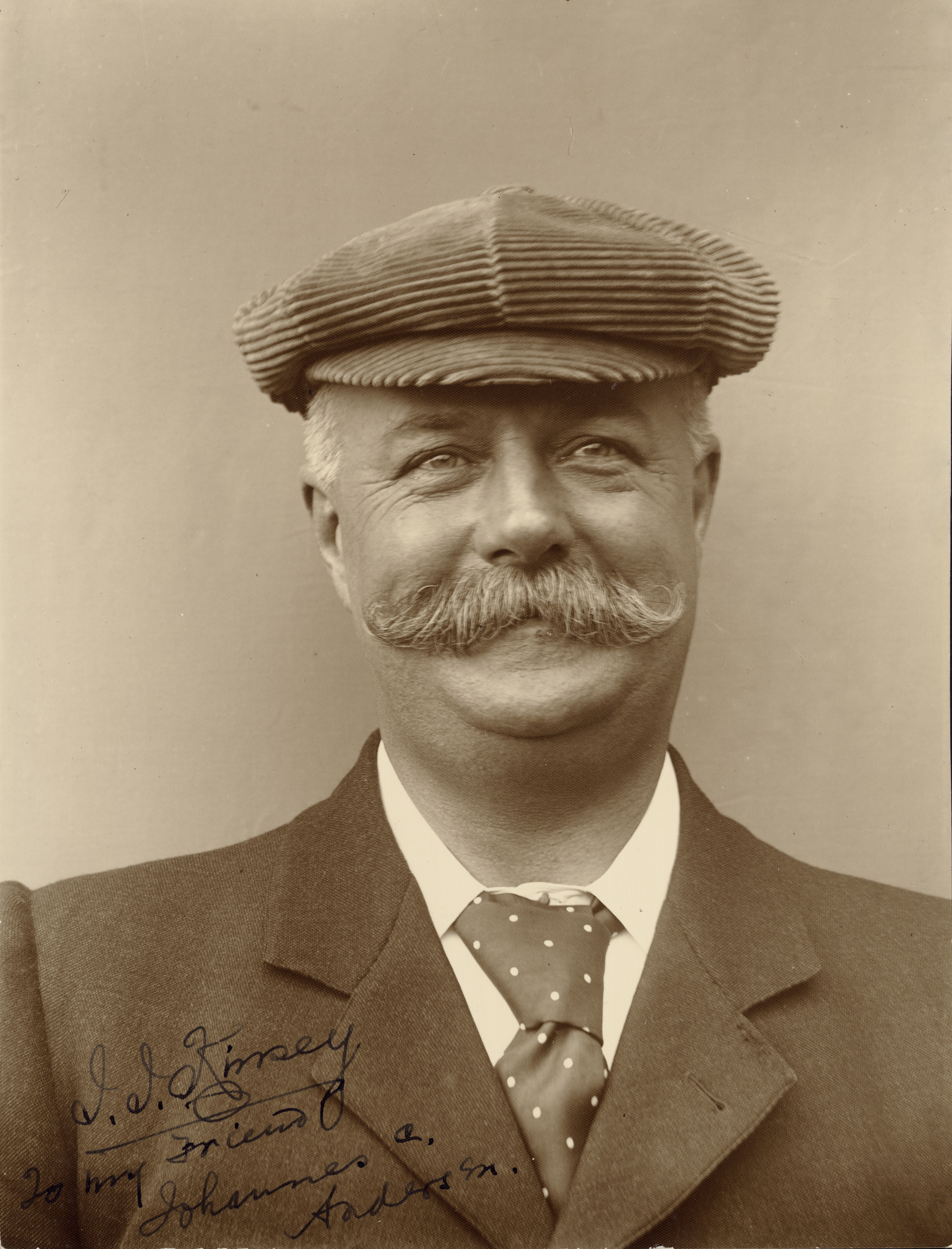
- Kinsey, c. 1910
- Born: Joseph James Kinsey; 1852; Plumstead, England
- Died: 5 May 1936; Warrimoo, Merivale, Christchurch
- Resting place: Karori Cemetery, Wellington

Sir Joseph James Kinsey (1852 – 5 May 1936) was a businessman, collector, and philanthropist from Christchurch, New Zealand. He was deeply connected to the Antarctic expeditions of Sir Ernest Shackleton (1874–1922) and Captain Robert Falcon Scott (1868–1912).

Kinsey was born in Plumstead near London in 1852; at the time, his home town belonged to Kent. He received his education at the Royal Naval School near Greenwich. In 1872, he married Sarah Ann Garrard of London, and they had a daughter, May, in 1873. He taught for eight years at Dulwich College and resigned in 1880 to emigrate to New Zealand on the Jessie Readman. Kinsey and his family arrived at Lyttelton Harbour on 22 October 1880.

Kinsey settled in Christchurch and in 1880, he set up Kinsey and Co., shipping agents and insurance brokers.

Kinsey was a very close friend to Robert Falcon Scott, and some of the last things that Scott wrote in his diary were to Kinsey. The two pages in Scott's journal were of such intimate nature that they were cut out and given to Kinsey before it was sent to England.

Kinsey was a collector of books; he had a personal library of over 15,000 titles. When special books were published, he often bought between a half to a dozen of them, to then given them away to visitors or other book lovers.

He was awarded the Scott Medal by the Royal Geography Society in 1914, and in the 1919 New Year Honours, Kinsey was knighted for his contributions to the Antarctic expeditions. In 1935, he was awarded the King George V Silver Jubilee Medal.

Kinsey died on 5 May 1936 at his home 'Warrimoo' in Papanui Road in the Christchurch suburb of Merivale. His body was brought to Wellington, where he was cremated at Karori and his ashes interred at the adjoining cemetery. His wife died on 15 May 1941 at their home. Her funeral service was held at St Mary's Church in Merivale, and she was buried in the cemetery of St Paul's Anglican Church in Papanui.
