= Muriwai Regional Park =

Regional park in West Auckland, New Zealand

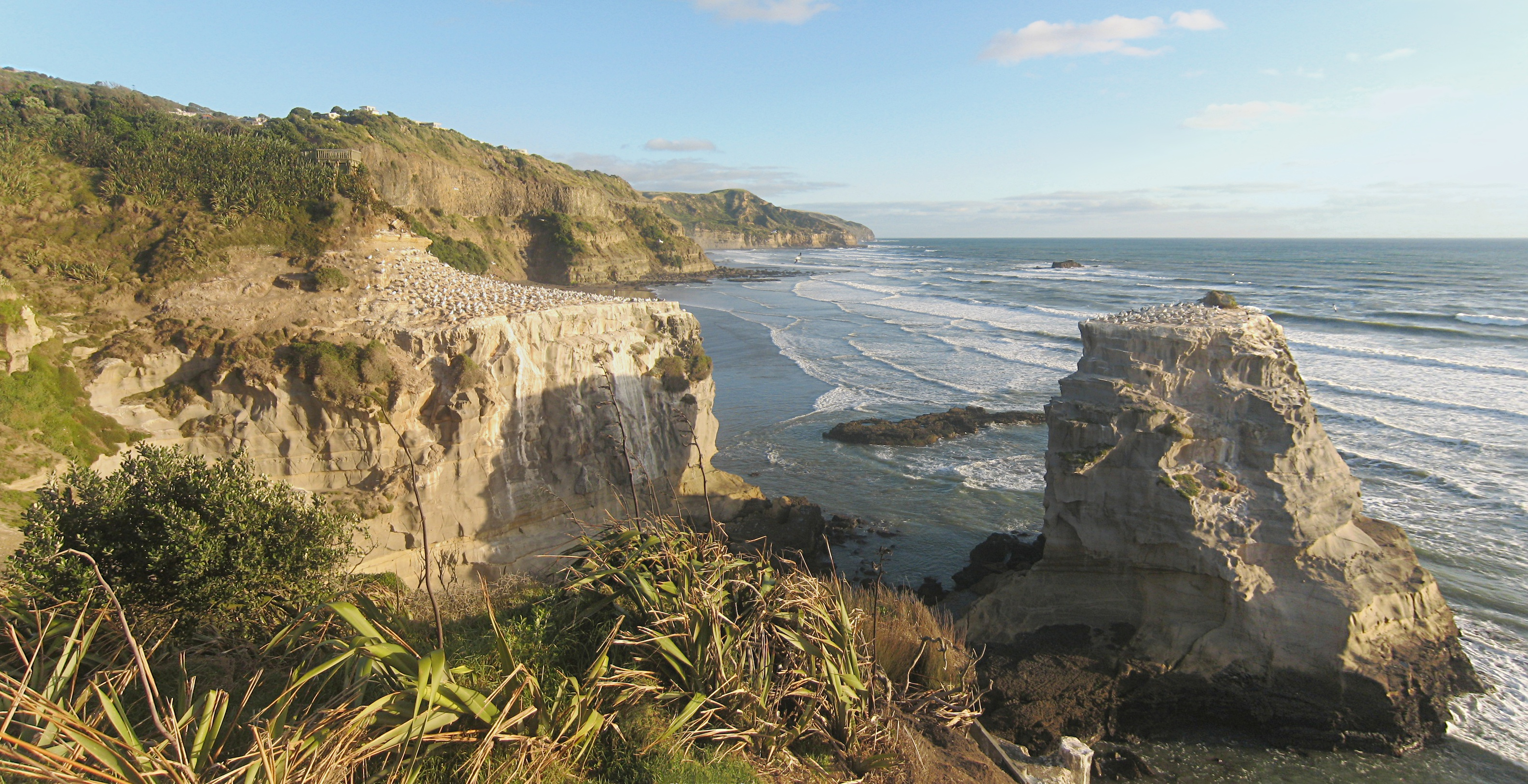
- Gannet colony at Otakamiro Point

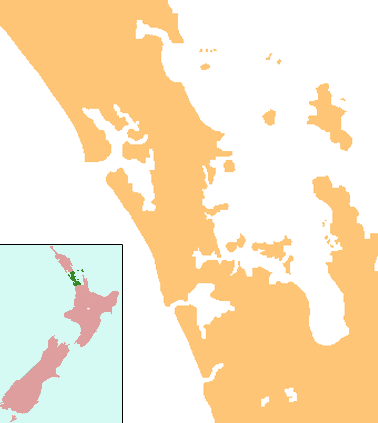
- Location within New Zealand Auckland
- Location: Muriwai, Rodney, Auckland, New Zealand
- Coordinates: 36.831512°S 174.4245704°E
- Operator: Auckland Council

Muriwai Regional Park is a regional park located in Muriwai on the west coast of the Auckland Region of New Zealand's North Island. It is situated in Rodney north-west of Auckland and is owned and operated by Auckland Council.

== Geography ==
Maukatia (Maori Bay) to the south is separated from Muriwai Beach by Otakamiro Point, with its steep cliffs and rocky nesting areas that are home to the region's only colony of Australasian gannets. The site of the gannetry has been identified as an Important Bird Area by BirdLife International.

== Biodiversity ==
The rare korowai gecko is endemic to the west coast of the Auckland Region, almost exclusively found in the Muriwai Regional Park sand dunes.

== History ==
The park's origins begin in 1906, when a public domain was established at Motutara, the gannet colony. After a series of enlargements, the area became the Muriwai Regional Park in 1969.

== Recreation ==
The Regional Park includes a golf course along Coast Road, and the area north of Ōkiritoto Stream is known as the "Five Mile Strip" or "Five Mile Block" as this is its approximate length. A horse park (parking area for horse floats and trucks to unload) is located just to the south of Ōkiritoto Stream. 4WD access on to the beach is also provided at this point.

The Five Mile Block has recreational trails for both walking and horse-riding. Cyclists can use Coast Road as far as the top of the Regional Park, but are not permitted into the adjoining Woodhill Forest by the forest managers. Dog walkers also frequent the area, as it provides a wide range of off-leash walking opportunities.

== Gallery ==
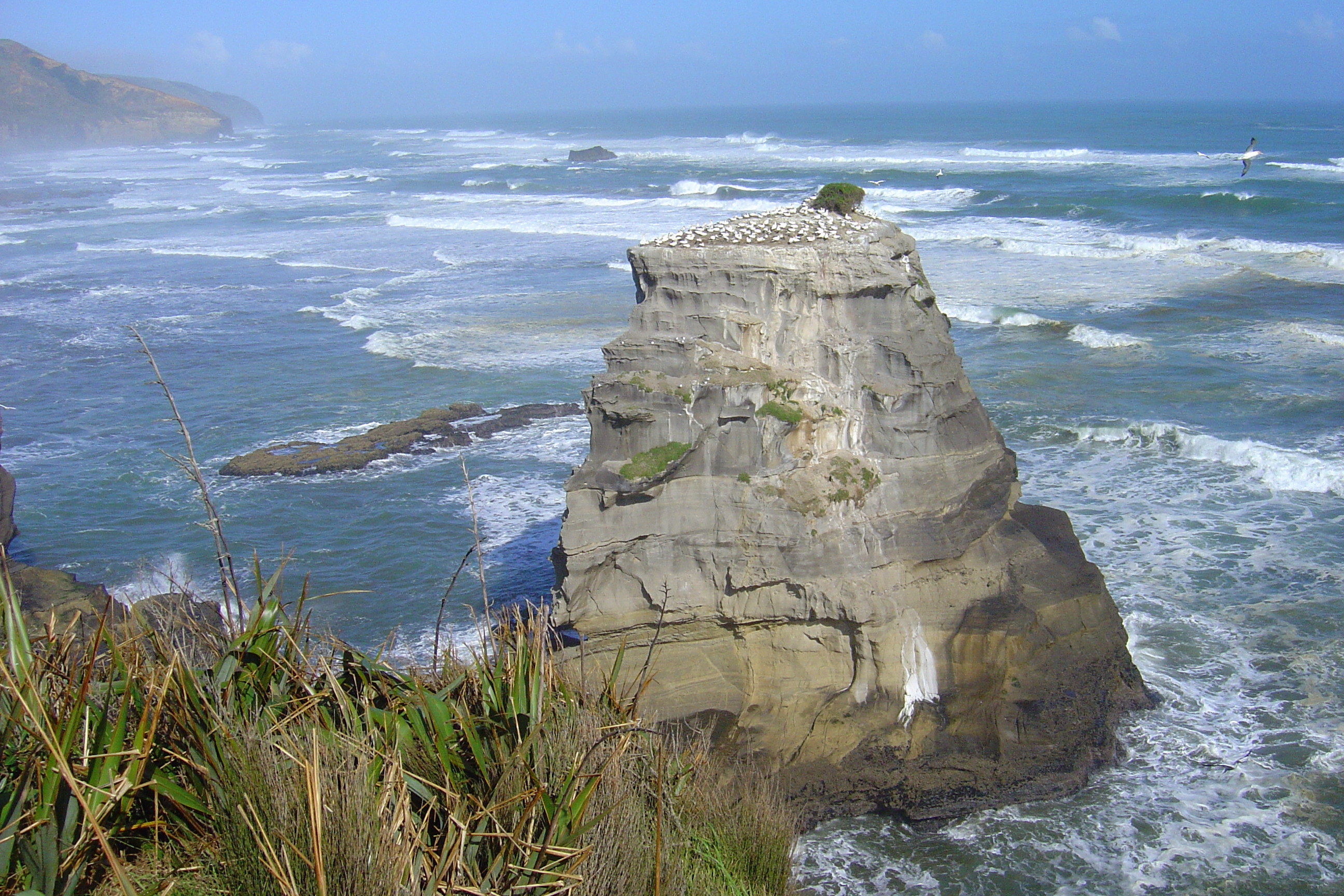
Wild coast and gannet colony - Motutara Island

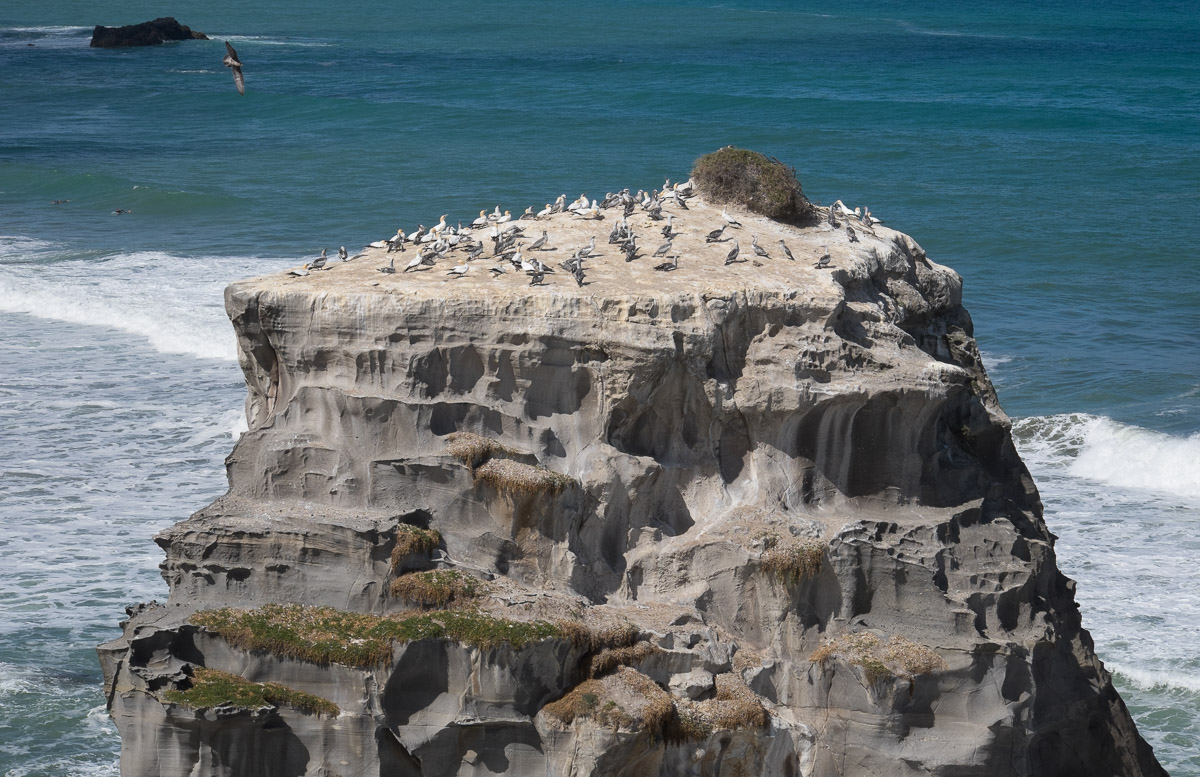
A closer look at the colony

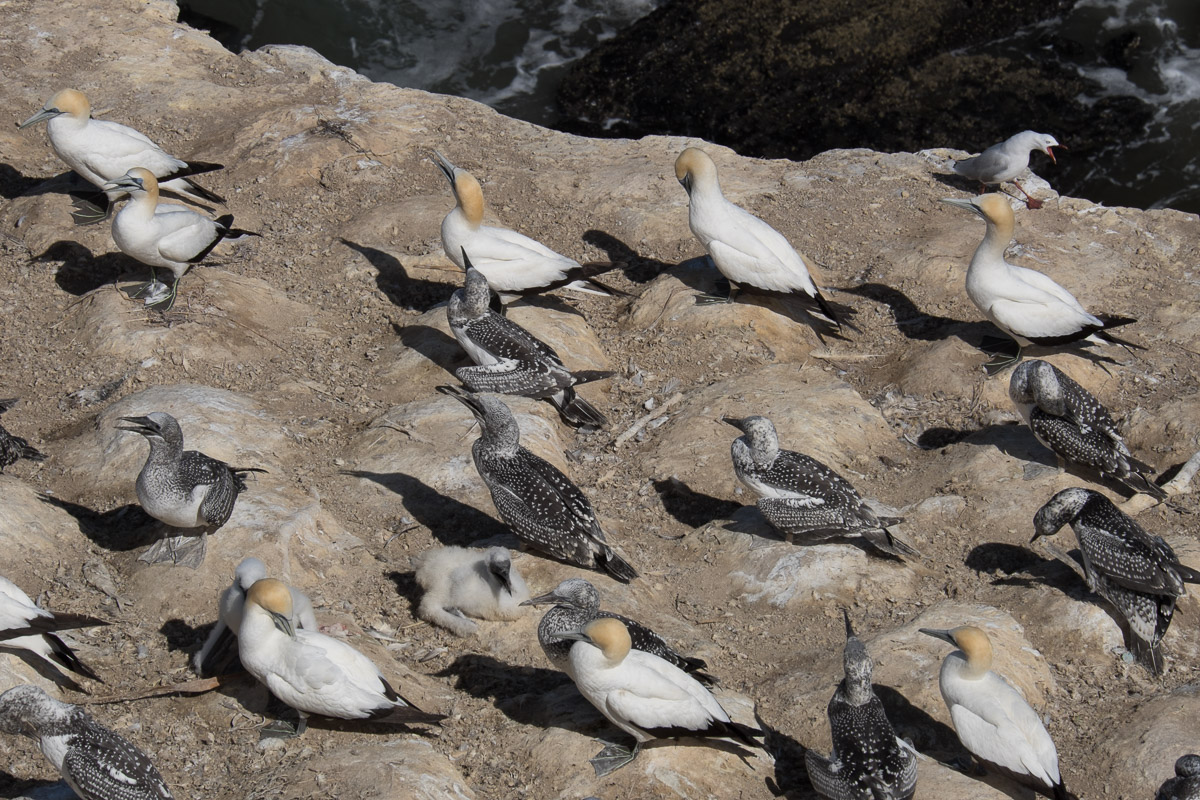
Gannets at Muriwai; adults and one young bird

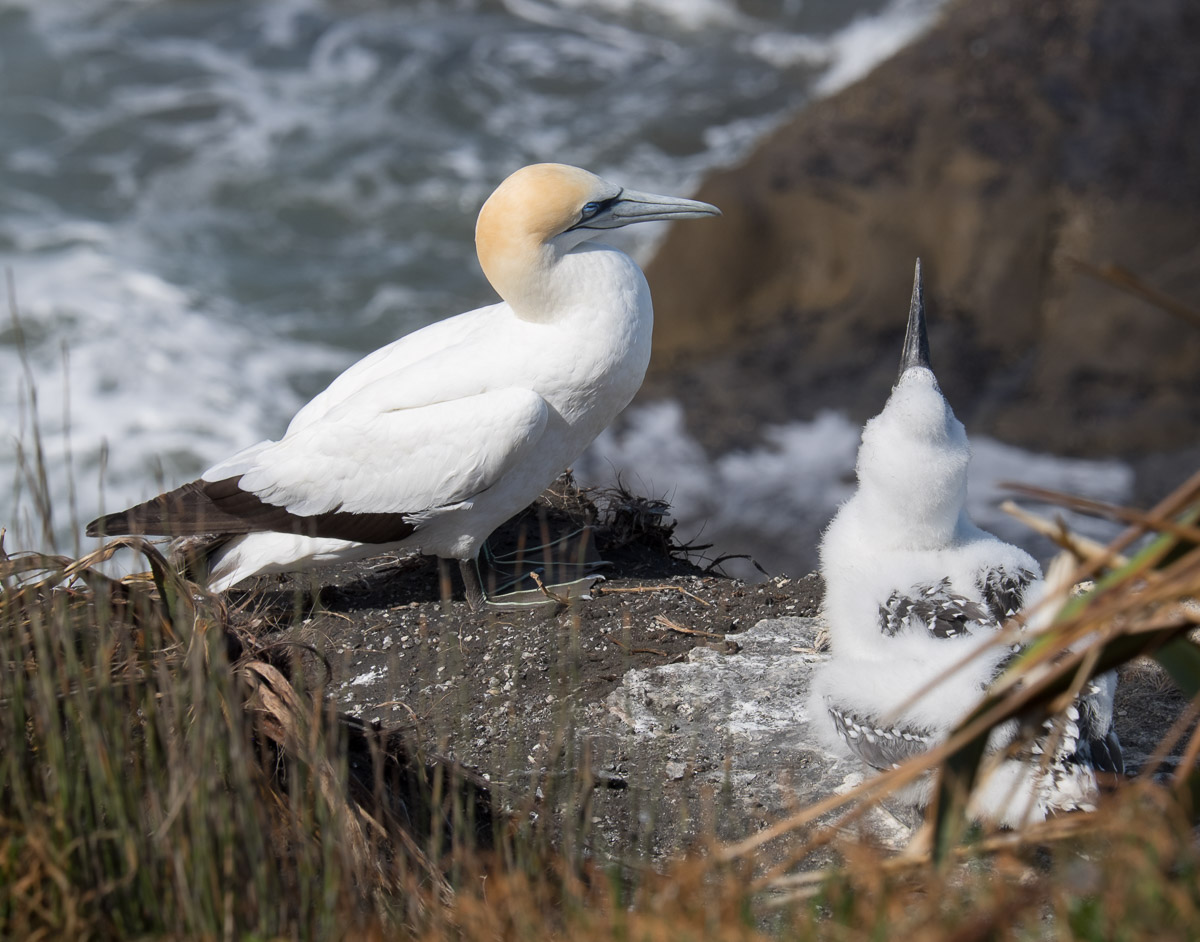
Adult and child gannet at Muriwai
