= Muriwai =

Beach community near Auckland, New Zealand

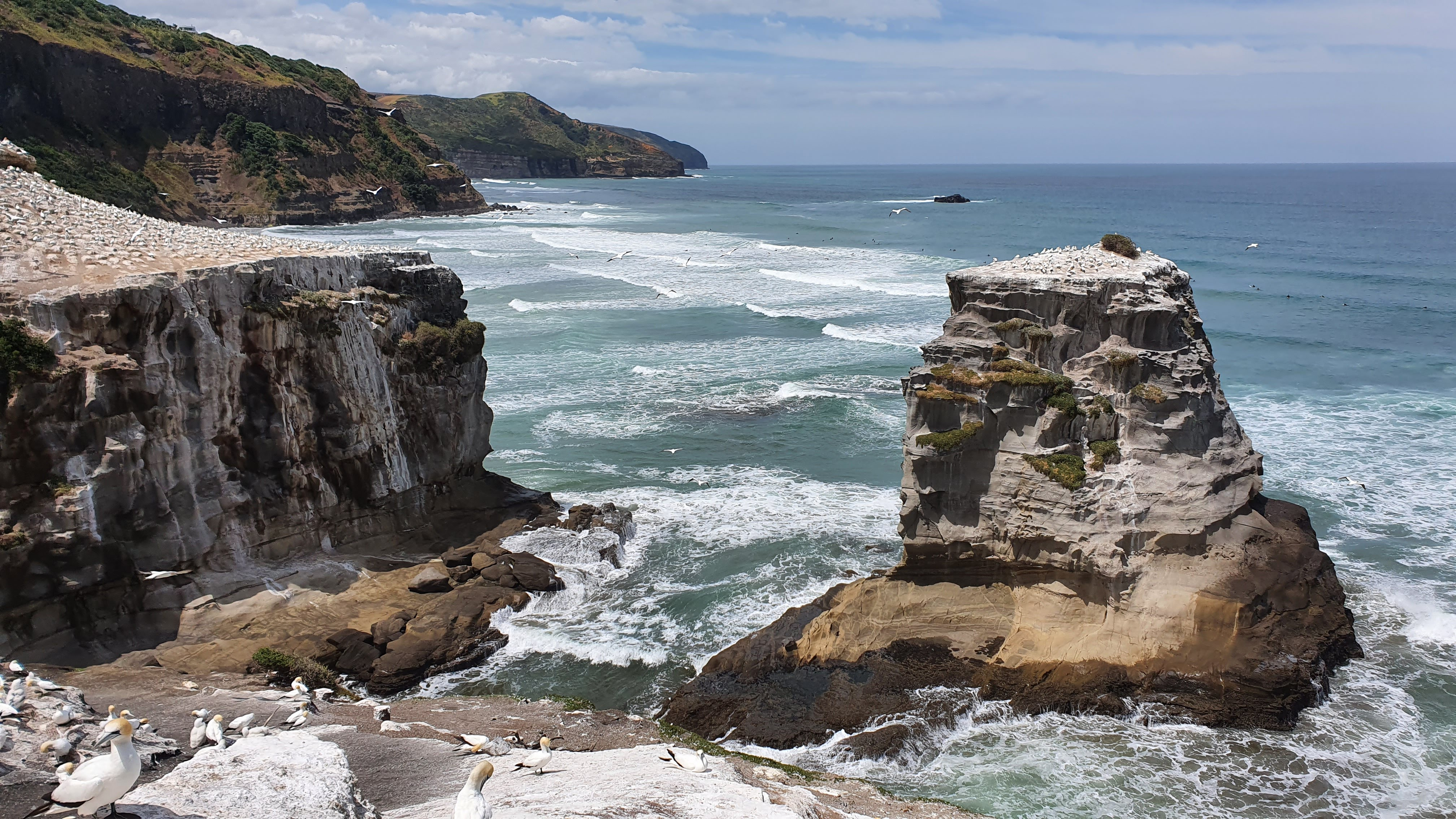
- Muriwai Beach
- Interactive map of Muriwai
- Coordinates: 36°49′48″S 174°26′06″E
- Country: New Zealand
- Region: Auckland
- Ward: Rodney ward
- Local board: Rodney Local Board
- Subdivision: Kumeū subdivision
- Electorates: Kaipara ki Mahurangi; Te Tai Tokerau

Government
  - Territorial Authority: Auckland Council
  - Mayor of Auckland: Wayne Brown
  - Kaipara ki Mahurangi MP: Chris Penk
  - Te Tai Tokerau MP: Mariameno Kapa-Kingi

Area
  - Total: 3.02 km^{2} (1.17 sq mi)

Population (June 2025)
  - Total: 1,110
  - Density: 368/km^{2} (952/sq mi)

Muriwai, also called Muriwai Beach, is a coastal community on the west coast of the Auckland Region in the North Island of New Zealand. The black-sand surf beach and surrounding area is a popular recreational area for Aucklanders. The Muriwai Regional Park includes a nesting site for a large colony of gannets.

The New Zealand Ministry for Culture and Heritage gives a translation of "water's end" for Muriwai.

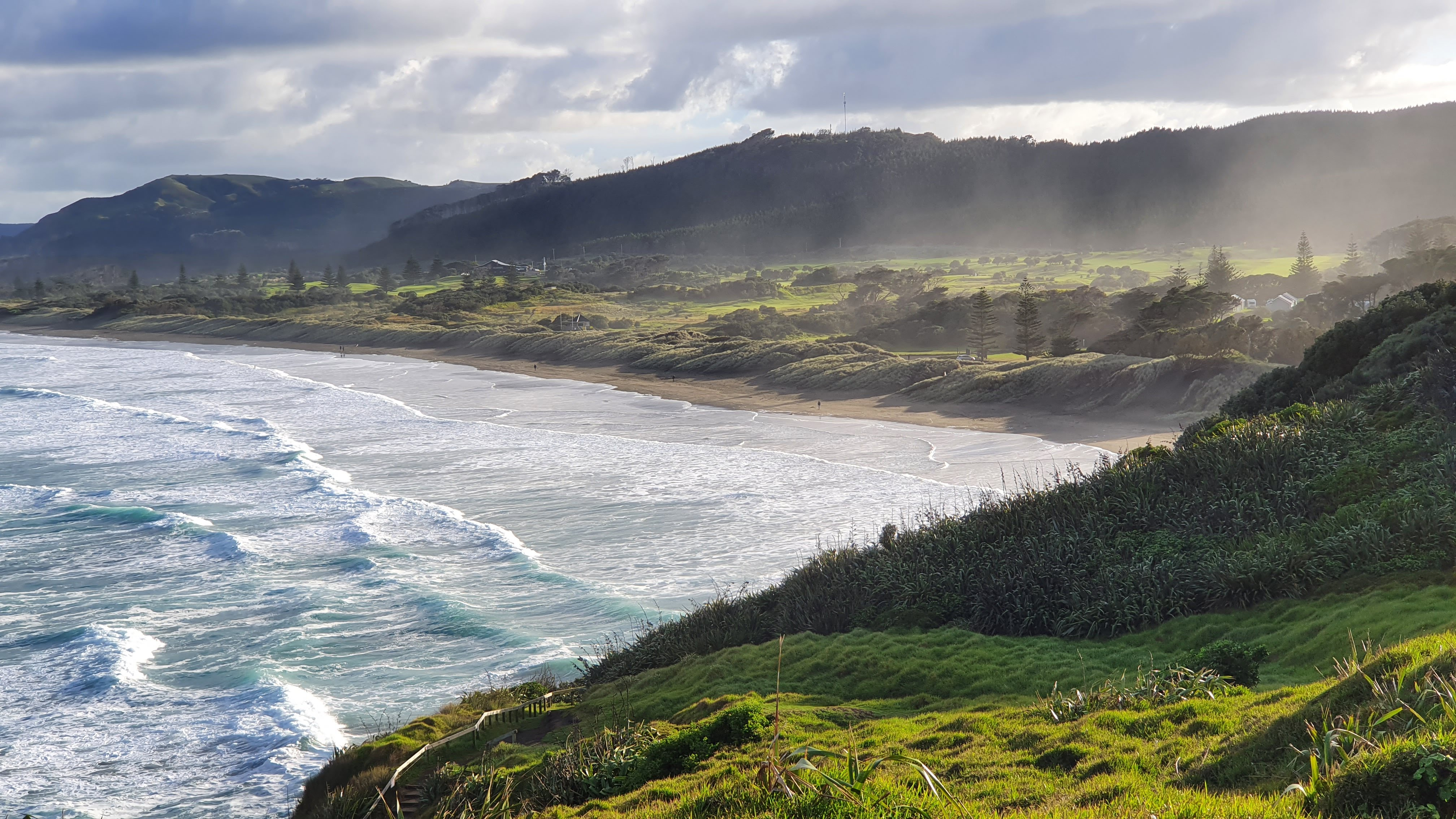
Muriwai Beach looking north

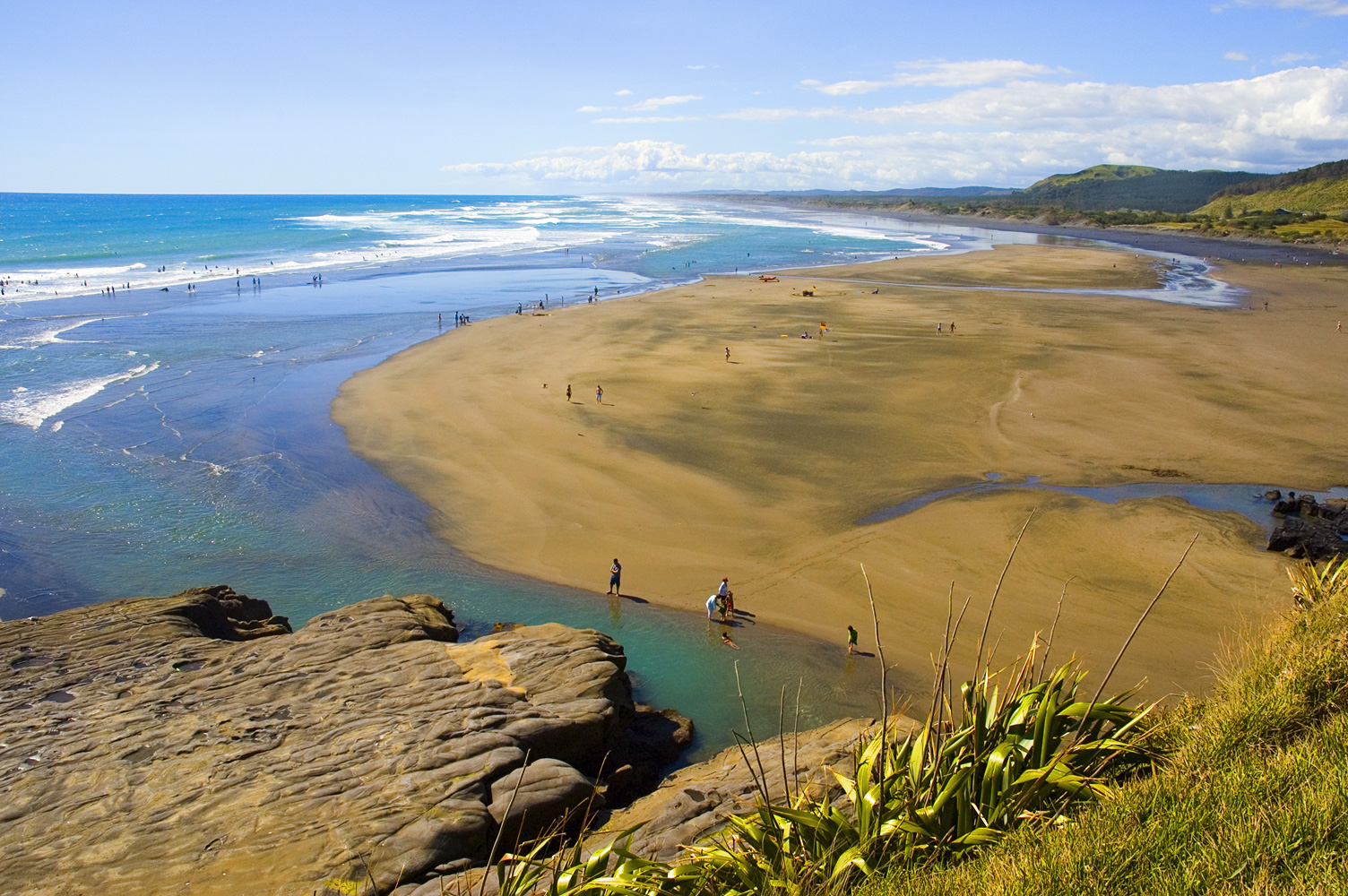
Muriwai Beach southern end

== Geology ==
The Muriwai area was uplifted from the sea floor between 3 and 5 million years ago. Much of the landscape is formed by remnants of the eastern side of the Waitākere Volcano, notably the pillow lava formations seen along the cliffs south of Muriwai beach. The area is primarily formed by sand, sedimentary rock and piha conglomerate. Cliff walls dominate much of southern Muriwai. Muriwai Beach has black sand, caused by the iron content derived from the ancient volcanoes in the area, including the large Kaipara Volcano which was situated offshore from the Kaipara Heads, and erupted 23-16 million years ago. The black sand is moved up the west coast of the North Island by longshore drift.

Oaia Island is an island located off the coast of Muriwai.

== Biodiversity ==
Motutara Island at Muriwai is a rare mainland colony for Australasian gannets. The rare korowai gecko is endemic to Muriwai area, primarily found in the sand dunes of Muriwai Beach.

== History ==
The Muriwai area is traditionally a part of rohe of the Tāmaki Māori tribe Te Kawerau ā Maki, known originally by the name One Rangatira ("The Chiefly Beach"), referring to the tohunga Rakatāura's visit to the beach. The beach has spiritual significance to Te Kawerau ā Maki, as it is a part of Te Rerenga Wairua, the pathway that souls take to Cape Reinga to depart the world.

Te Kawerau ā Maki and Ngāti Whātua fought over the area when the latter settled south of the Kaipara Harbour. Muriwai became known as the border between Te Kawerau ā Maki and Ngāti Whātua, when peace was struck by the Te Kawerau ā Maki chief Te Hawiti / Te Au o Te Whenua. The area was settled by Ngāti Te Kahupara, a Ngāti Whātua hapū with Kawerau ancestry, until the 20th century.

The southern Muriwai Beach area was also known as Paenga Tohorā, referring to the many whale strandings there. Te Au o Te Whenua lived at Te Korekore, a headland pā located at the south end of the beach. He was known for collecting and drying toheroa (Paphies ventricosa) collected from the Muriwai area, which he would trade with other Tāmaki Māori iwi and hapū for delicacies. The gannet colony headland was known as Ōtakamiro, the location of a pā named after the ancestor Takamiro. Other pā and villages to the south-east of the beach included Matuakore, Te Toheriri, Ngārihariha and Tirikohua. The modern name, Muriwai, means "End of the Water". It refers to the Te Muriwai, a kāinga located upstream of the beach along Ōkiritoto Stream, which over time became a name for the river valley, and eventually for the wider area.

During the late 19th century, John Foster established a flax mill at Muriwai, stopping in 1893 when this became less economically viable. In 1894 Muriwai Valley School was established. The school only operated part-time, due to the school's rural location. At the turn of the century, politician and Mayor of Auckland City Edwin Mitchelson constructed a wooden mansion at Muriwai which he named Oaia, referencing adjacent Oaia Island.

During World War II, the New Zealand Government feared that the Japanese army could invade Auckland along the west coast, landing at Muriwai. During this period, a United States Marine Corps camp was established at Muriwai, in part due to these fears.

In 1962, Muriwai became the location where the COMPAC submarine communications cable connected Auckland to Sydney, and a repeater station was installed 3 km from Muriwai Beach. This was used until 5 October 1983, when a cable fault at Sydney caused the system to cease working.

Muriwai was badly damaged by Cyclone Gabrielle in February 2023. Two volunteer firefighters were killed by a landslip during the cleanup.

== Location ==
Muriwai is approximately 17 km west of Kumeū, 42 kilometres northwest of Auckland city, at the southern end of an unbroken 50 kilometre stretch of beach which extends up the Tasman Sea coast to the mouth of the Kaipara Harbour. One of several popular beaches in the area (others include Piha and Karekare), it experiences a population explosion in summer when Aucklanders head to the sea. It is in the Rodney Ward of the Auckland Region.

== Governance ==
Muriwai was first governed by the Muriwai Road Board, which was established 26 September 1867 but abolished 4 years later.

Muriwai is part of the Local Government Rodney Ward of Auckland Council and is part of the Kumeu Subdivision of the Rodney Local Board. Muriwai is in the Kaipara ki Mahurangi electorate. (Previously Helensville electorate.)

== Demographics ==
Statistics New Zealand describes Muriwai as a small urban area, which covers 3.02 km^{2} (1.17 sq mi) and had an estimated population of 1,110 as of June 2025, with a population density of 368 people per km^{2}.

Historical population
Year	Pop.	±% p.a.
2006	1,044	—
2013	1,131	+1.15%
2018	1,248	+1.99%
2023	1,125	−2.05%

Muriwai had a population of 1,125 in the 2023 New Zealand census, a decrease of 123 people (−9.9%) since the 2018 census, and a decrease of 6 people (−0.5%) since the 2013 census. There were 576 males, 546 females and 3 people of other genders in 285 dwellings. 2.4% of people identified as LGBTIQ+. The median age was 42.9 years (compared with 38.1 years nationally). There were 237 people (21.1%) aged under 15 years, 135 (12.0%) aged 15 to 29, 612 (54.4%) aged 30 to 64, and 141 (12.5%) aged 65 or older.

People could identify as more than one ethnicity. The results were 94.7% European (Pākehā); 12.8% Māori; 3.2% Pasifika; 3.2% Asian; 1.6% Middle Eastern, Latin American and African New Zealanders (MELAA); and 3.2% other, which includes people giving their ethnicity as "New Zealander". English was spoken by 97.9%, Māori language by 2.1%, and other languages by 10.1%. No language could be spoken by 1.9% (e.g. too young to talk). The percentage of people born overseas was 18.7, compared with 28.8% nationally.

Religious affiliations were 17.6% Christian, 0.3% Māori religious beliefs, 1.6% Buddhist, 1.1% New Age, and 1.3% other religions. People who answered that they had no religion were 72.8%, and 6.1% of people did not answer the census question.

Of those at least 15 years old, 255 (28.7%) people had a bachelor's or higher degree, 414 (46.6%) had a post-high school certificate or diploma, and 123 (13.9%) people exclusively held high school qualifications. The median income was $52,700, compared with $41,500 nationally. 198 people (22.3%) earned over $100,000 compared to 12.1% nationally. The employment status of those at least 15 was that 471 (53.0%) people were employed full-time, 159 (17.9%) were part-time, and 30 (3.4%) were unemployed.

== Activity ==
- Surfing is the main pastime at Maukatia (Maori Bay) and Muriwai Beach. Other pastimes enjoyed at Maukatia include paragliding and hang gliding, especially when the prevailing southwesterly wind provides favourable conditions.
- Fishing is also popular, although dangerous in many places.
- Bush walking is encouraged, with boardwalks in place, and the 'Hilary Trail' passes through Muriwai.
- Driving along the beach is popular, especially at fishing contest time, although vehicles have been mass stranded in past years.
- Surf boards, surfing tuition and sand yachts are available for hire at the Muriwai Surf School near the beach.
- There are many mountain bike trails up in the pines, mainly downhill and freeride trails.
- Surf lifeguards have active weekend patrols during the summer time and training for nippers
- The beach was used extensively for motor racing from the 1920s through to the 1940s.
- Horse riding is popular along the beach, as well as through the extensive tracks behind the sand dunes. Access is also available through the Woodhill Forest Equestrian Park.

== Bibliography ==
- Dunsford, Deborah (2002). Doing It Themselves: the Story of Kumeu, Huapai and Taupaki. Huapai-Kumeu Lions Club. ISBN 0-473-08969-6.
