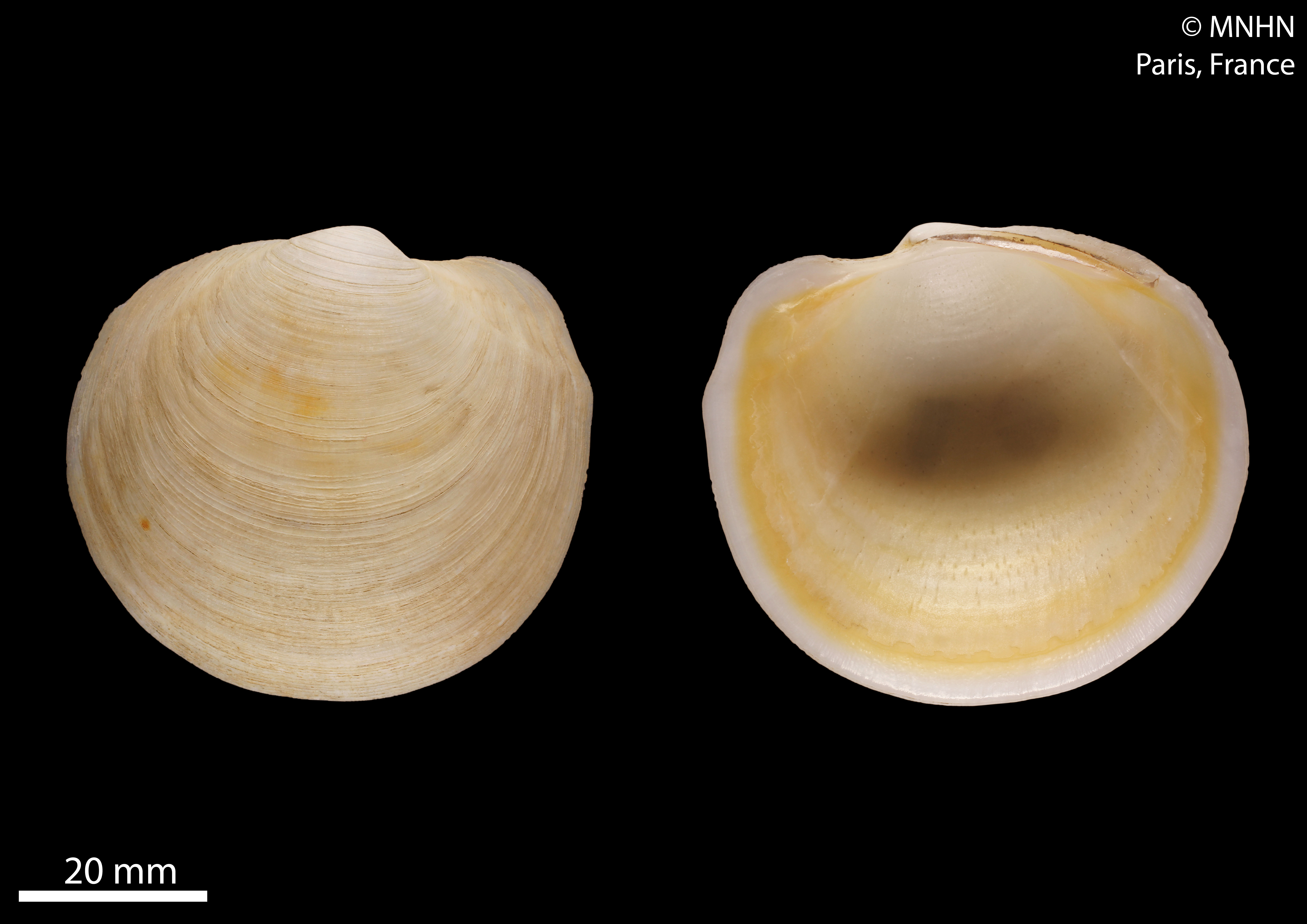
- Anodontia alba

Scientific classification
- Kingdom: Animalia
- Phylum: Mollusca
- Class: Bivalvia
- Order: Lucinida
- Family: Lucinidae
- Genus: Anodontia; Link, 1807

Synonyms
- Anodontia (Anodontia) Link, 1807; Lissosphaira Olsson, 1964

= Anodontia (bivalve) =

Genus of bivalves

Anodontia is a genus of bivalves belonging to the family Lucinidae.

The genus has a cosmopolitan distribution.

== Species ==
The following species are recognised in the genus Anodontia:

- Anodontia alba Link, 1807
- Anodontia conili (de Raincourt, 1877) †
- Anodontia edentuloides (Verrill, 1870)
- Anodontia gentili (Cossmann, 1904) †
- Anodontia parnensis (Deshayes, 1857) †
- Anodontia renulata (Lamarck, 1806) †
- Anodontia spherica (Dall & Ochsner, 1928) †
- Anodontia thalmani (Marks, 1951) †
- Anodontia waharoaensis Eagle, 1992 †
