= Ngāti Whātua o Kaipara =

- Iwi (tribe) in Māoridom
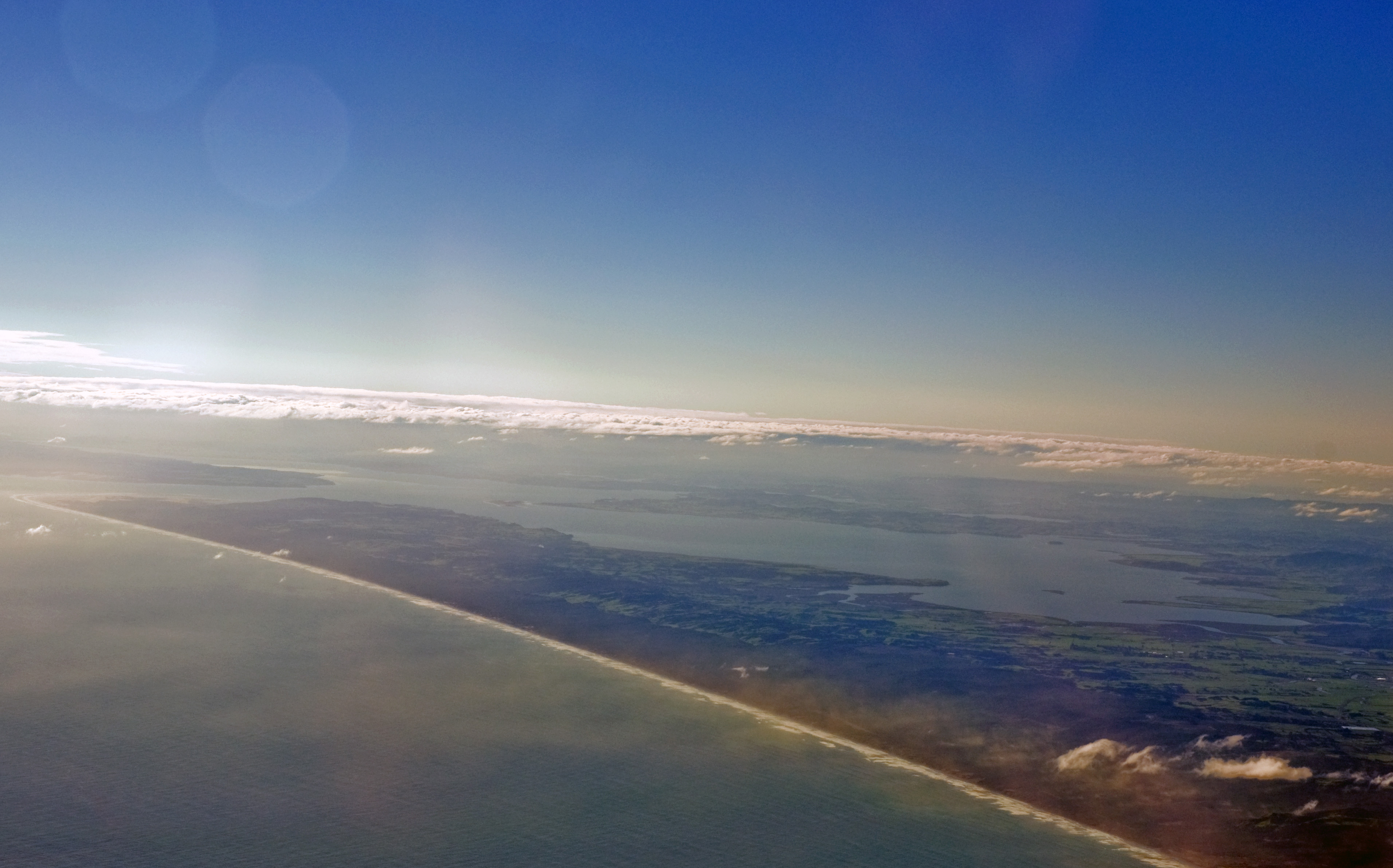
- The southern Kaipara Harbour and Te Korowai-o-Te-Tonga Peninsula
- Rohe (region): Southern Kaipara Harbour
- Waka (canoe): Māhuhu-ki-te-rangi
- Population: 7,326 (2018 census)
- Website: www.kaiparamoana.com

Ngāti Whātua o Kaipara (also known as Ngāti Whātua o Kaipara ki te Tonga) is a Māori iwi (tribe) and hapū (sub-tribe) of New Zealand, which is part of the larger Ngāti Whātua iwi. The iwi's rohe is focused around the southern Kaipara Harbour in the Auckland Region of New Zealand. Ngāti Whātua have been present in the Kaipara Harbour since the arrival of the Māhuhu-ki-te-rangi migratory waka, gradually moving towards the north. By the 17th century, Ngāti Whātua reestablished a presence in the southern Kaipara Harbour.

Ngāti Whātua o Kaipara is a modern name, established in the late 20th century as a part of the Waitangi Tribunal settlement process to differentiate the hapū and whānau of the southern Kaipara Harbour from those living in Northland or the Tāmaki isthmus of central Auckland. Since the signing of the Ngāti Whātua o Kaipara Claims Settlement Act 2013, Ngāti Whātua o Kaipara assets have been administered by two trusts: Nga Maunga Whakahii o Kaipara Development Trust, responsible for the commercial and social development of Ngāti Whātua o Kaipara, and Tari Pupuritaonga Trust, responsible for holding culturally important lands and ensuring that these are never alienated from Ngāti Whātua o Kaipara.

According to the 2018 New Zealand census, an estimated 7,326 people affiliate with Ngāti Whātua o Kaipara.

== Hapū and marae ==
Ngāti Whātua o Kaipara originally referred to the hapū and whānau of five marae who lodged Wai 312 claim in 1992: Kakanui Marae, Araparera Marae, Puatahi Marae, Haranui Marae and Reweti Marae. By 2011, the term had been redefined in the Waitangi Tribunal Deed of Settlement to encompass people who descend from Haumoewaarangi, who also descend from a recognised ancestor of Ngāti Hine, Ngāti Rāngo, Ngāti Whātua Tuturu, Te Taoū or Te Uri-o-Hau who exercised customary rights in the southern Kaipara Harbour and inland areas. Within this definition, there are five associated hapū and five marae:

- Ngāti Hine, based at Puatahi. The Ngāpuhi hapū of Ngāti Hine were given customary rights in the Glorit area by Ngāti Whātua following the battle of Te Ika a Ranganui.
- Ngāti Rāngo (also known as Ngāti Rongo), based in three locations along State Highway 16: Kakanui Marae in Kakanui, Araparera Marae near the mouth of the Arapārera River (also known as Te Aroha Pā Marae) and Puatahi Marae, near the mouth of the Hōteo River. The wharenui of the Araparera Marae is named Kia Mahara, and the wharenui of Kakanui Marae is named Te Kia Ora.
- Ngāti Whātua Tuturu, based at Haranui Marae in Otakanini, South Kaipara Head. The wharenui of the marae is named Ngā Tai i Turia ki te Maro Whara.
- Te Taoū, based at Reweti Marae. The wharenui of the marae is named Whiti Te Ra.
- Te Uri-o-Hau, based in the northern and central Kaipara Harbour. Te Uri-o-Hau underwent a separate Waitangi Tribunal settlement process and are represented by a different settlement trust, claims covered by the Te Uri o Hau Claims Settlement Act 2002 are outside of the scope of Ngāti Whātua o Kaipara.

== Rohe and area of interest ==
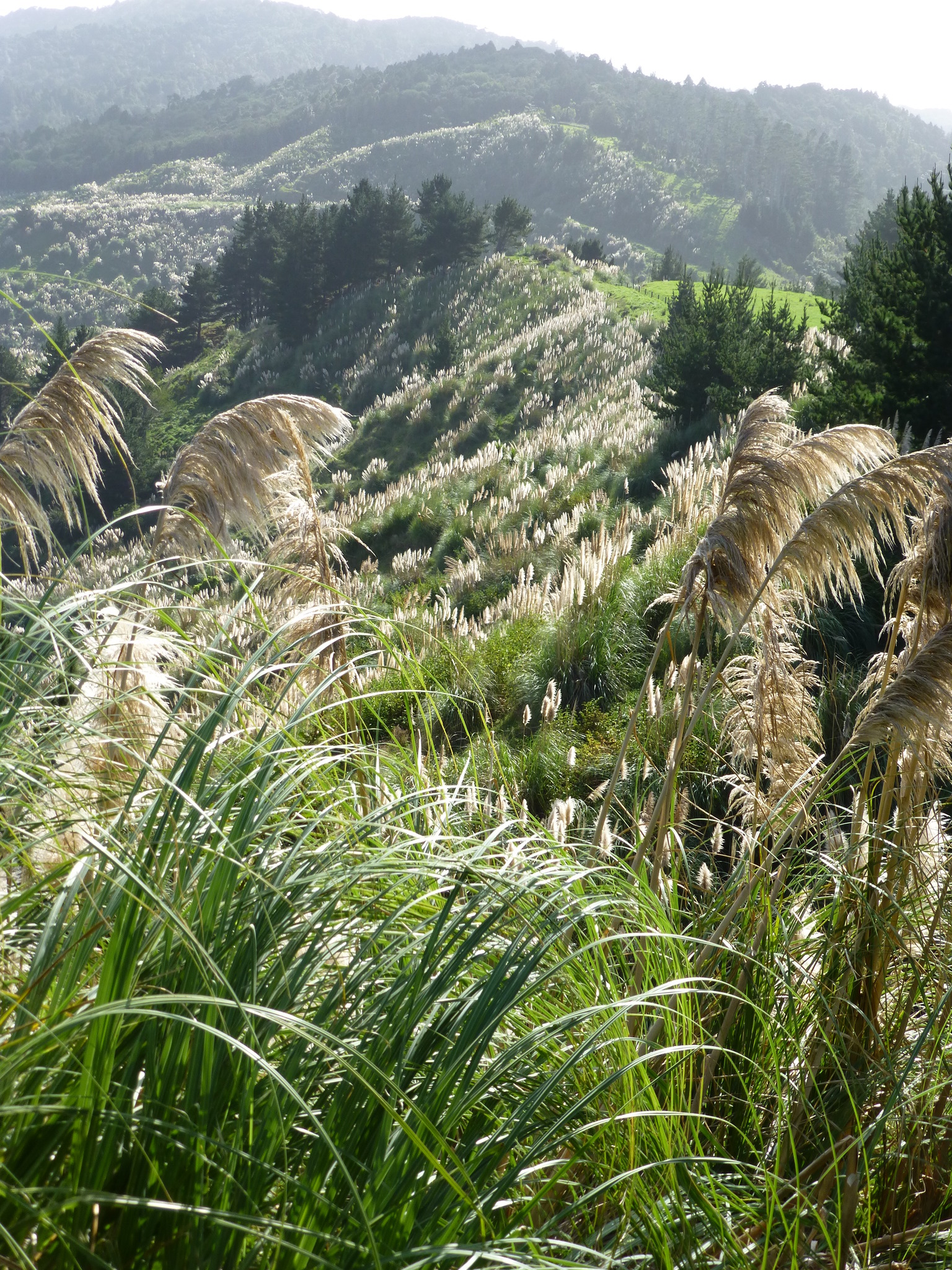
Atuanui / Mount Auckland is an important maunga for the people of Puatahi Marae

The rohe of Ngāti Whātua o Kaipara and area of interest covers 148,265 ha (366,370 acres) of the Auckland Region. Most of this area is within private ownership; the largest iwi owned area is a 1,709 ha (4,220 acres) block adjacent to Woodhill Forest.

Most of the rohe is located within the Rodney local board area, with some areas found in the Hibiscus and Bays and Upper Harbour local board areas. Major landmarks in the rohe include the southern Kaipara Harbour, Helensville, the Upper Waitematā Harbour, the Kaipara River catchment, the Hōteo River, Arapārera River, Te Korowai-o-Te-Tonga Peninsula, Riverhead Forest and Woodhill Forest.

Outside of the Kaipara Harbour, places of importance for Ngāti Whātua o Kaipara include Atuanui / Mount Auckland, maunga for Puatahi Marae, Tuhirangi, the maunga for Kakanui Marae, and Tauwhare, maunga for Reweti Marae.

== History ==
=== Traditional history ===
Ngāti Whātua descend from the ancestor Tuputupuwhenua (also known as Tumutumuwhenua) and his wife Kui. The iwi traces its arrival in New Zealand to the Māhuhu-ki-te-rangi migratory waka, which landed north of the Kaipara Harbour. They also descend from ancestors who migrated from Muriwhenua in the Far North, as well as the descendants of Toi, who were already living in the Kaipara Harbour area and intermarried with the Māhuhu-ki-te-rangi crew members Rongomai, Mawete and Po in the area around Manukapua Island. Manukapua Island is seen as the birthplace of the wider Ngāti Whātua.

In the 17th and early 18th centuries, Ngāti Whātua tribes began returning to the southern Kaipara Harbour area from Northland, primarily on the waka Te Potae o Wahieroa and Te Wharau. Initially relations between the iwi were friendly, and many important marriages were made. Hostilities broke out and Ngāti Whātua asked for assistance from Kāwharu, a famed Tainui warrior from Kawhia. Kāwharu's repeated attacks of the Waitākere Ranges settlements became known as Te Raupatu Tīhore, or the stripping conquest. Ngāti Whātua divided the land among different hapū, including Te Taoū, who were a major power in the Kaipara River catchment, and Te Uri-o-Hau to the north.

Around the year 1740, war broke out between Ngāti Whātua and Waiohua, the confederation of Tāmaki Māori tribes centred to the southeast on the Tāmaki isthmus, leading to a faction of Ngāti Whātua to relocate to the isthmus, eventually forming Ngāti Whātua Ōrākei. During the Musket Wars in the early 19th century, Ngāti Whātua of the Kaipara Harbour had conflict with Ngāpuhi and other northern tribes. Following the battle of Te Ika a Ranganui at Kaiwaka, Ngāti Whātua fled the area except for a small contingent who remained for ahi kā (visible land occupation). Ngāti Whātua of the Kaipara Harbour began returning from 1828, and were fully re-established by 1835. Following the battle, Ngāti Whātua made a customary gift of land to members of Ngāti Hine of Ngāpuhi in the Glorit area.

=== Early colonial era ===
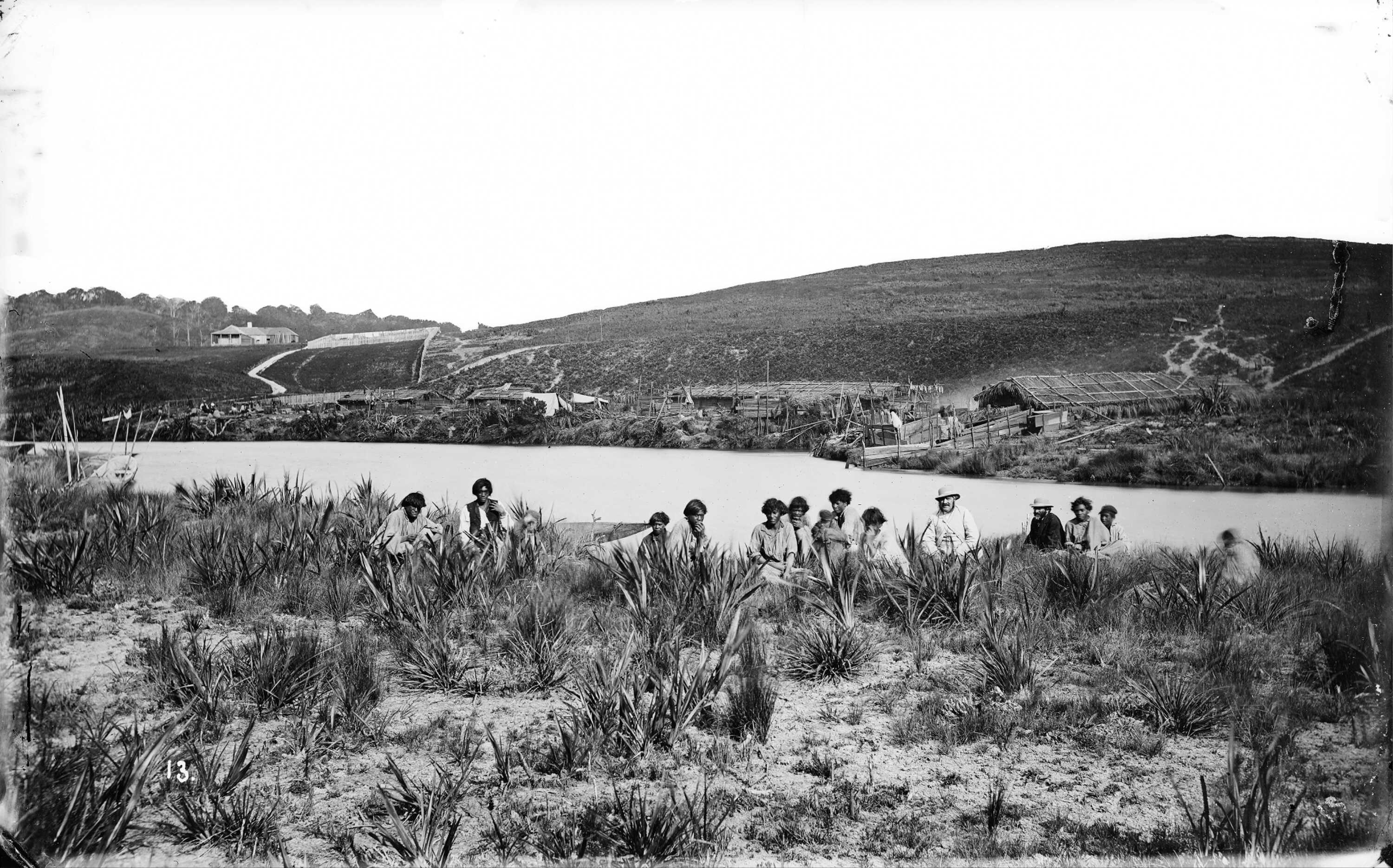
View of the Ngāti Whātua village adjacent to Helensville (1863)

After the Treaty of Waitangi was signed in 1840, Ngāti Whātua operated coastal trading vessels, supplying goods to early European settlers at Auckland from the Kaipara Harbour area. In the hope that European settlements would develop and stimulate the economy, Ngāti Whātua gifted large areas of the southern Kaipara Harbour to the Crown between 1853 and 1865. This included land for the Kumeu–Riverhead Section, a short-lived railway connecting the Kaipara and Waitematā harbours that operated from 1875 to 1881.

Between 1865 and 1900, the Native Land Court individuated collectively-owned Ngāti Whātua lands, a gradual process which led to land alienation. By 1900, almost the entire southern Kaipara area had been alienated from Ngāti Whātua, and only 10% of their traditional rohe had been retained.

=== Waitangi Tribunal settlement ===
Ngāti Whātua o Kaipara were a major party involved in the court case New Zealand Maori Council v Attorney-General (1987), in part due to concerns that government-owned lands such as the Woodhill Forest would be transferred to state-owned enterprises and no longer be available resources for Waitangi Tribunal settlements. On 8 September 1992, the Wai 312 claim was lodged by members of the five marae of the southern Kaipara Harbour area: Reweti Marae, Haranui Marae, Araparera Marae, Puatahi Marae and Kakanui Marae.

The Deed of Settlement for Wai 312 was signed in 2011, which was signed into law in with the Ngāti Whātua o Kaipara Claims Settlement Act 2013. During the settlement process, two trusts were established to administer Ngāti Whātua o Kaipara assets: Nga Maunga Whakahii o Kaipara Development Trust, responsible for the commercial and social development of Ngāti Whātua o Kaipara, and Tari Pupuritaonga Trust, responsible for holding culturally important lands and ensuring that these are never alienated from Ngāti Whātua o Kaipara.

== Bibliography ==
- Paterson, Malcolm (2009). "Ko Ngā Kurī Purepure o Tāmaki, e Kore e Ngari i te Pō". In Macdonald, Finlay; Kerr, Ruth (eds.). West: The History of Waitakere. Random House. pp. 49–62. ISBN 9781869790080.
- Taua, Te Warena (2009). "He Kohikohinga Kōrero mō Hikurangi". In Macdonald, Finlay; Kerr, Ruth (eds.). West: The History of Waitakere. Random House. pp. 23–48. ISBN 9781869790080.

== See also ==
- List of Māori iwi
