= Woodhill, Auckland =

Woodhill
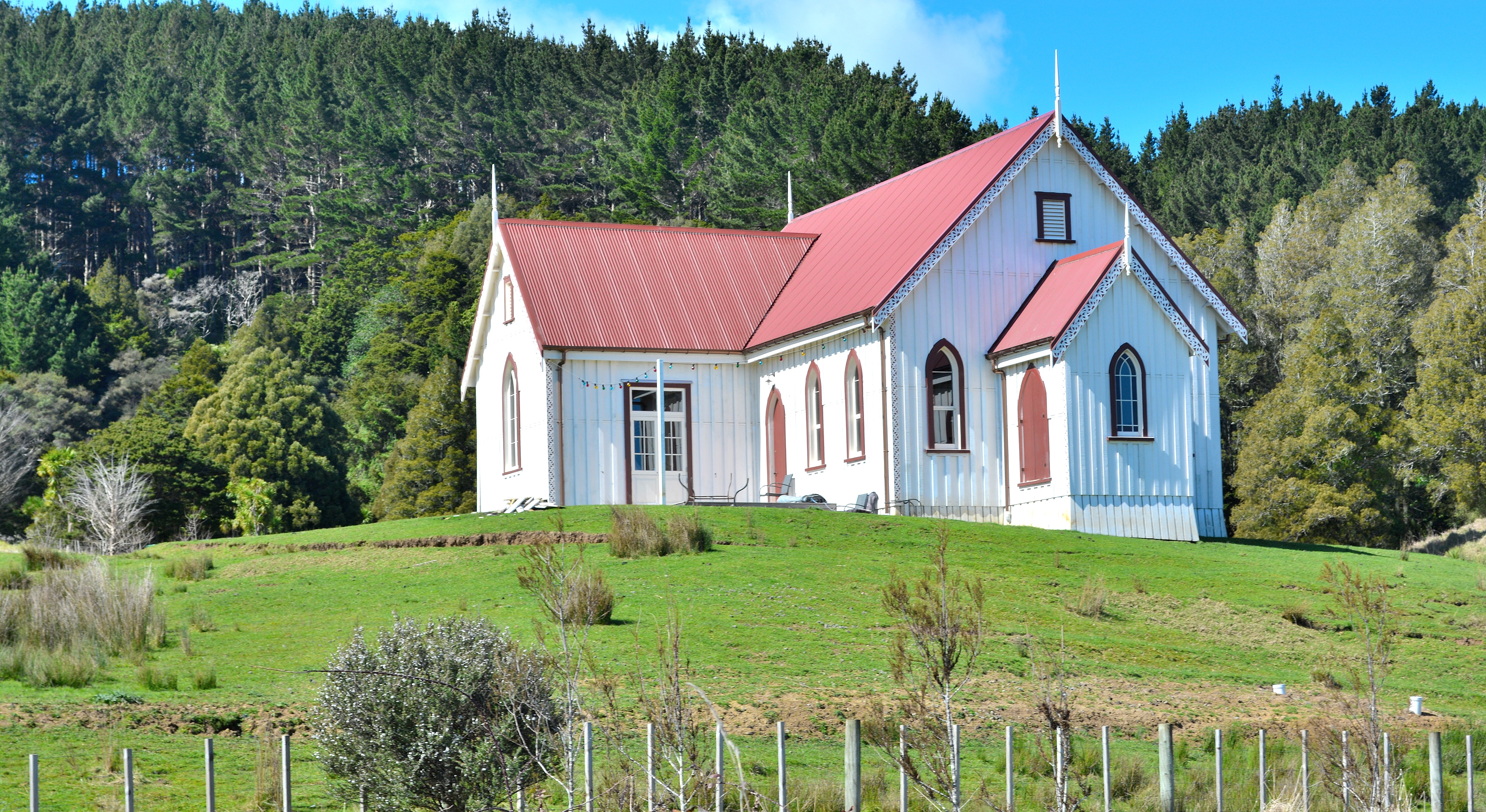
- The old Woodhill church

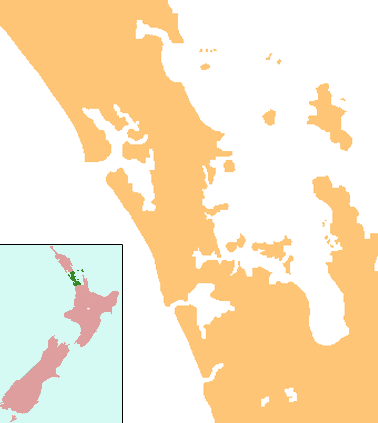
- Location within New Zealand Auckland
- Coordinates: 36°44′50″S 174°26′18″E
- Country: New Zealand
- Region: Auckland Region
- District: Rodney District
- Community board: Rodney Local Board
- Subdivision: Kumeū subdivision

Woodhill is a locality in the Auckland Region of New Zealand. It is in the Western Ward of the Rodney District. Woodhill is approximately 6 kilometres northwest of Waimauku and 10 km south of Helensville on State Highway 16. The North Auckland Line passes through the area. The Woodhill Forest lies to the west.

== History ==
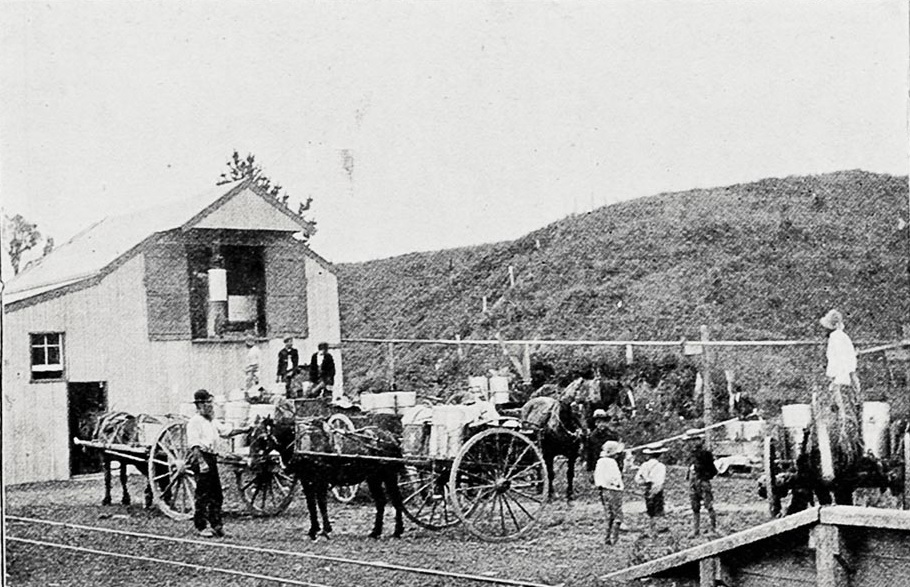
Messrs, Ambury and English's dairy factory in Woodhill, 1901

In 1878, Woodhill School was established, in part sponsored by Ngāti Whātua communities of the surrounding area, who wanted a school for their children to attend.

The railway line reached Woodhill in the 1880s, and allowed expansion of the existing farming settlement. Ambury's Creamery shipped the cream by rail to be made into butter in Auckland. A post office was established, and a store opened up opposite the creamery, becoming a social centre until it was destroyed by fire about 1970. The Woodhill Hall was another centre for social gatherings. It contained a library in the late 1920s, and was also used for church services.

In the 1920s, planting of trees to reclaim the sand dunes to the west brought forestry workers to the settlement, and a pine tree nursery was created in Woodhill in 1934. A settlement was created on the hill for the workers and their families. After the forest was privatised in 1987, this settlement disappeared.

== Education ==
Woodhill School is a coeducational full primary (years 1-8) school with a decile rating of 6 and a roll of 80 (July 2026). The school celebrated its 126-year reunion in 2003. The school was one of the earliest established in West Auckland. Many children from as far away as Swanson would commute to Woodhill, until the Swanson School was established in 1888.

== Climate ==
Climate data for Woodhill (1971–2000 normals, extremes 1948–1993)
Month	Jan	Feb	Mar	Apr	May	Jun	Jul	Aug	Sep	Oct	Nov	Dec	Year
Record high °C (°F)	30.1 (86.2)	29.2 (84.6)	31.1 (88.0)	27.2 (81.0)	25.5 (77.9)	22.2 (72.0)	20.0 (68.0)	20.0 (68.0)	22.0 (71.6)	23.9 (75.0)	25.8 (78.4)	28.1 (82.6)	31.1 (88.0)
Mean maximum °C (°F)	26.4 (79.5)	26.4 (79.5)	26.4 (79.5)	23.8 (74.8)	21.0 (69.8)	18.7 (65.7)	17.4 (63.3)	18.2 (64.8)	19.3 (66.7)	21.3 (70.3)	23.3 (73.9)	25.2 (77.4)	27.5 (81.5)
Mean daily maximum °C (°F)	22.9 (73.2)	23.4 (74.1)	22.5 (72.5)	20.1 (68.2)	17.7 (63.9)	15.6 (60.1)	14.9 (58.8)	15.2 (59.4)	16.3 (61.3)	17.7 (63.9)	19.3 (66.7)	21.3 (70.3)	18.9 (66.0)
Daily mean °C (°F)	18.7 (65.7)	18.9 (66.0)	17.8 (64.0)	15.6 (60.1)	13.5 (56.3)	11.4 (52.5)	10.6 (51.1)	11.0 (51.8)	12.4 (54.3)	13.8 (56.8)	15.3 (59.5)	17.0 (62.6)	14.7 (58.4)
Mean daily minimum °C (°F)	14.4 (57.9)	14.4 (57.9)	13.2 (55.8)	11.1 (52.0)	9.2 (48.6)	7.3 (45.1)	6.3 (43.3)	6.8 (44.2)	8.5 (47.3)	9.9 (49.8)	11.3 (52.3)	12.8 (55.0)	10.4 (50.8)
Mean minimum °C (°F)	8.6 (47.5)	8.7 (47.7)	6.9 (44.4)	4.2 (39.6)	1.5 (34.7)	−0.4 (31.3)	−1.2 (29.8)	0.5 (32.9)	2.2 (36.0)	3.5 (38.3)	5.3 (41.5)	6.7 (44.1)	−2.1 (28.2)
Record low °C (°F)	6.1 (43.0)	4.8 (40.6)	4.7 (40.5)	−0.8 (30.6)	−1.5 (29.3)	−4.2 (24.4)	−3.7 (25.3)	−2.5 (27.5)	−1.0 (30.2)	−0.6 (30.9)	2.0 (35.6)	2.5 (36.5)	−4.2 (24.4)
Average rainfall mm (inches)	75.1 (2.96)	59.2 (2.33)	99.4 (3.91)	108.5 (4.27)	113.8 (4.48)	134.8 (5.31)	129.9 (5.11)	137.4 (5.41)	121.9 (4.80)	92.1 (3.63)	94.0 (3.70)	88.4 (3.48)	1,254.5 (49.39)
Source: NIWA
