= Woodhill, New Zealand =

Woodhill is the name of several places in New Zealand:

- Woodhill, Auckland is a locality near Helensville in the Rodney District
- Woodhill, Whangarei is a suburb of Whangarei
- Woodhill Forest is a forest located northwest of Auckland
