= South Kaipara Head =

Peninsula in the North Island, New Zealand

- Peninsula
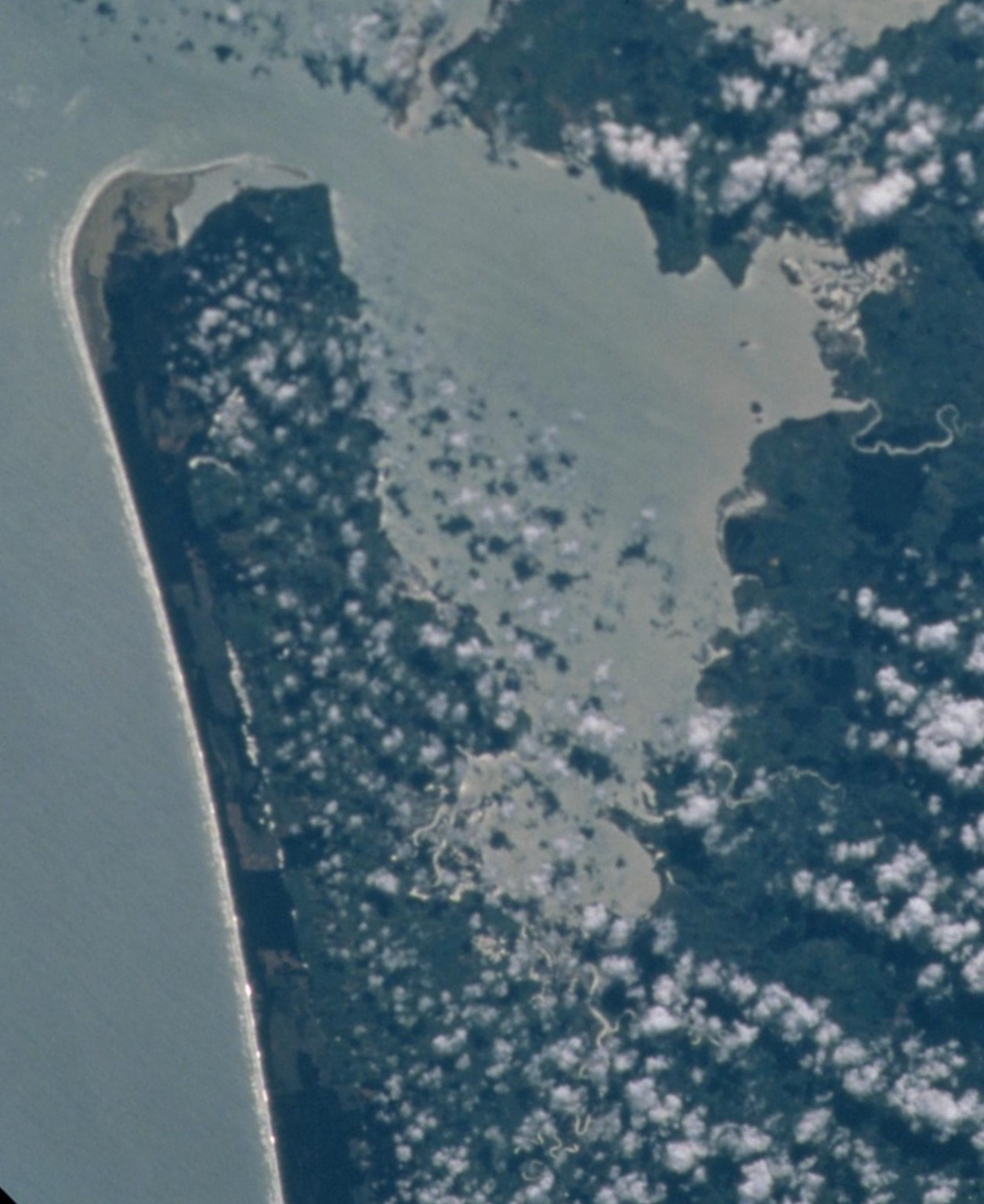
- Te Korowai-o-Te-Tonga Peninsula seen from the Space Shuttle Discovery in 2000

- Location within New Zealand
- Coordinates: 36°32′S 174°15′E
- Location: Auckland Region, New Zealand

Area
  - Total: 339.72 square kilometres (131.17 sq mi)
- Population: 2,980 as of June 2025

South Kaipara Head, also known as the South Kaipara Peninsula, commonly known as just South Head, and officially Te Korowai-o-Te-Tonga Peninsula, is a long peninsula in the North Island of New Zealand, extending north along the western edge of the Kaipara Harbour for some 35 kilometres (22 mi) from near Helensville to the harbour's mouth. The peninsula was officially renamed in 2013 as part of a Treaty of Waitangi settlement. The mouth of the Kaipara Harbour separates the peninsula from the larger Pouto Peninsula to the north.

== Etymology ==
The name Te Korowai-o-Te-Tonga means 'the southern cloak' in the Mãori language.

== Geography ==
The Peninsula is mostly low-lying or gently undulating, rising to only some 191 metres (627 ft) at its highest point. It is bounded in the west by the Tasman Sea, with the long beaches of Te Oneone Rangatira Beach and Muriwai Beach along its Tasman coast. The settlement of Muriwai lies immediately to the south of the peninsula.

The peninsula is a sand dune that formed geologically very recently, within the last two million years.

Inland from the Tasman Sea coast is the long strip of Woodhill Forest, which is bounded in the east by a string of low-lying lakes, of which the largest and northernmost is Lake Rototoa. The lakes were traditionally Ngā Tapuwae o Kawharu, "The Footsteps of Kawharu", referring to the famed Tainui warrior Kawharu, who was asked by Ngāti Whātua to travel to the South Kaipara area to assist them in military conflicts. The lakes are an important habitat for many bird species, such as the New Zealand grebe, New Zealand scaup.

To the peninsula's east lie numerous small streams and inlets which feed Kaipara Harbour. The northern tip of the peninsula is dominated by a large area of sand and mud, known as the Papakanui Spit and the Waionui Inlet. The sandspit is a roosting site for many migratory wading bird species.

The northwest of the peninsula, adjacent to the Papakanui Spit, is an extensive sand dune used by the New Zealand Defence Force for weapons training.

== History ==
The Waionui Inlet to the north of the peninsula is the site of a number of middens dating to the archaic period of Māori history. European settlers began purchasing land on the peninsula from the 1870s. In the 1880s, Alfred Buckland developed much of the peninsula as a cattle run. The land was subdivided into individual farming blocks in the 1920s.

Following the passing of the Ngati Whatua o Kaipara Claims Settlement Act 2013, the name of the peninsula, known informally as South Head Peninsula, was officially gazetted by the New Zealand Geographic Board as Te Korowai-o-Te-Tonga Peninsula (lit. 'the cloak of the south') on 25 July 2013.

== Biodiversity ==
The rare korowai gecko is endemic to the west coast of the Auckland Region such as Te Korowai-o-Te-Tonga Peninsula, and is named after the peninsula.

== Demographics ==
South Head statistical area covers the entire peninsula, including the settlement of Shelly Beach, but does not include Parakai or Helensville. It covers 339.72 km^{2} (131.17 sq mi) and had an estimated population of 2,980 as of June 2025, with a population density of 8.8 people per km^{2}.

Historical population
Year	Pop.	±% p.a.
2006	1,878	—
2013	2,040	+1.19%
2018	2,595	+4.93%
2023	2,859	+1.96%

South Head had a population of 2,859 in the 2023 New Zealand census, an increase of 264 people (10.2%) since the 2018 census, and an increase of 819 people (40.1%) since the 2013 census. There were 1,431 males, 1,410 females and 15 people of other genders in 939 dwellings. 2.9% of people identified as LGBTIQ+. The median age was 42.9 years (compared with 38.1 years nationally). There were 543 people (19.0%) aged under 15 years, 432 (15.1%) aged 15 to 29, 1,383 (48.4%) aged 30 to 64, and 501 (17.5%) aged 65 or older.

People could identify as more than one ethnicity. The results were 87.3% European (Pākehā); 21.4% Māori; 4.7% Pasifika; 3.6% Asian; 0.7% Middle Eastern, Latin American and African New Zealanders (MELAA); and 1.8% other, which includes people giving their ethnicity as "New Zealander". English was spoken by 97.9%, Māori language by 3.8%, Samoan by 0.8%, and other languages by 6.5%. No language could be spoken by 1.4% (e.g. too young to talk). New Zealand Sign Language was known by 0.3%. The percentage of people born overseas was 17.8, compared with 28.8% nationally.

Religious affiliations were 22.1% Christian, 0.2% Hindu, 0.3% Islam, 2.4% Māori religious beliefs, 0.4% Buddhist, 0.5% New Age, 0.1% Jewish, and 0.5% other religions. People who answered that they had no religion were 64.2%, and 9.1% of people did not answer the census question.

Of those at least 15 years old, 285 (12.3%) people had a bachelor's or higher degree, 1,335 (57.6%) had a post-high school certificate or diploma, and 591 (25.5%) people exclusively held high school qualifications. The median income was $40,200, compared with $41,500 nationally. 273 people (11.8%) earned over $100,000 compared to 12.1% nationally. The employment status of those at least 15 was that 1,191 (51.4%) people were employed full-time, 342 (14.8%) were part-time, and 66 (2.8%) were unemployed.

== See also ==
- Waioneke
