= Waioneke =

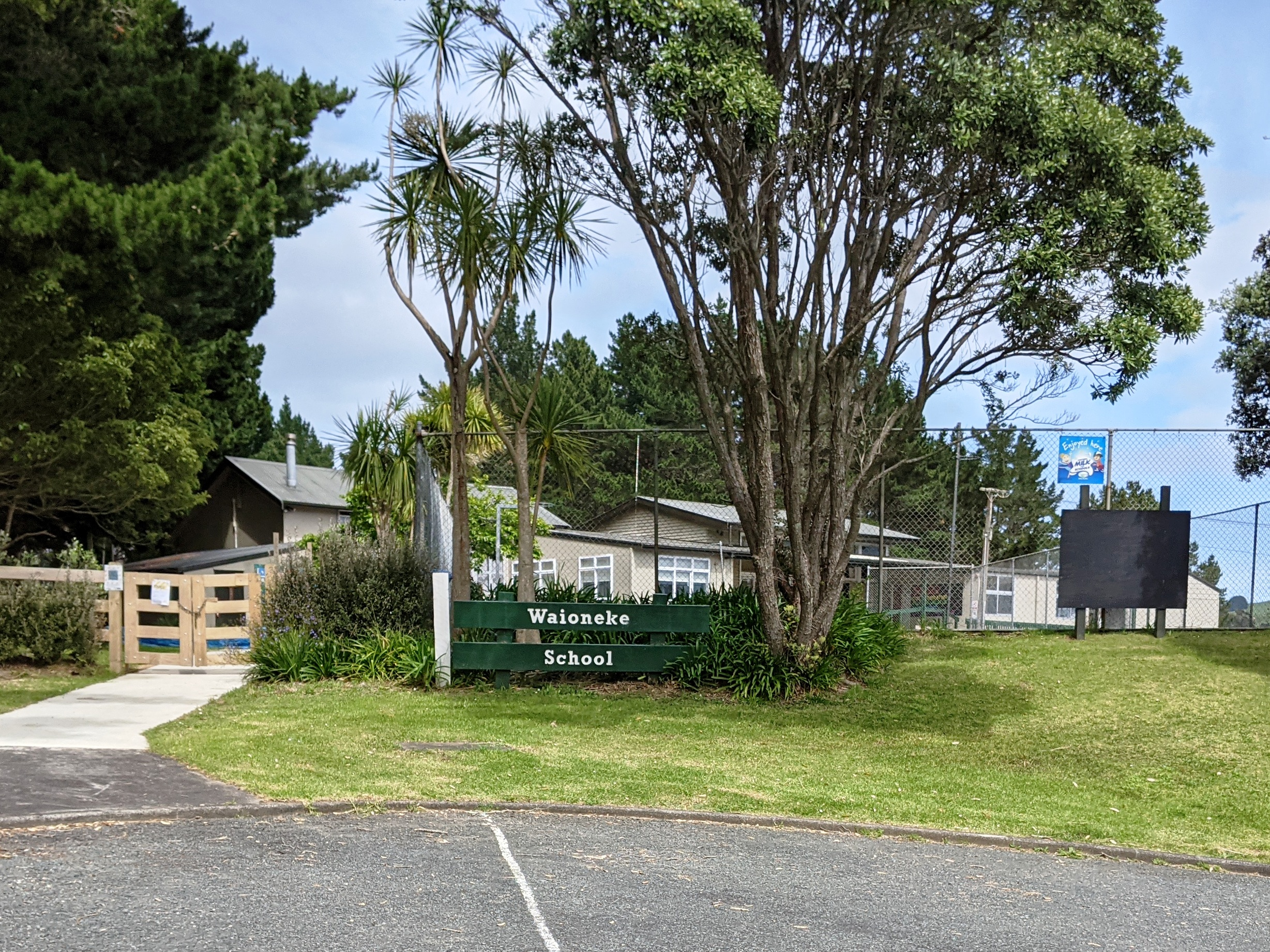
- Waioneke School
- Interactive map of Waioneke
- Coordinates: 36°32′30″S 174°18′05″E
- Country: New Zealand
- Region: Auckland Region
- Ward: Rodney Ward
- Community board: Rodney Local Board
- Subdivision: Kumeū subdivision
- Electorates: Kaipara ki Mahurangi; Te Tai Tokerau

Government
  - Territorial Authority: Auckland Council
  - Mayor of Auckland: Wayne Brown
  - Kaipara ki Mahurangi MP: Chris Penk
  - Te Tai Tokerau MP: Mariameno Kapa-Kingi

Waioneke is a locality on the South Kaipara Head of the Kaipara Harbour, in the Rodney District of New Zealand. Parakai is 22 km to the south-east, and the road continues another 14 km to the north-west. Rangitira Beach and Woodhill Forest are to the west, and Omokoiti Flats and the southern Kaipara Harbour are to the east.

== History ==
A Māori pā existed at Waioneke prior to European settlement of the area. The Waioneke block was taken up in 1868 by Daniel Pollen (who later became Premier of New Zealand) and William Spearman Young, to graze cattle.

The Waioneke Road District was formed 1886 but dissolved by the next year.

Waioneke was a centre of gum digging from 1880 to 1900.

Deer farming began in the area in the 1970s, and a processing plant was built in Waioneke.

== Demographics ==
Waioneke is in an SA1 statistical area which covers 18.15 km^{2} (7.01 sq mi). The SA1 area is part of the larger South Head statistical area.

Historical population
Year	Pop.	±% p.a.
2006	102	—
2013	114	+1.60%
2018	183	+9.93%
2023	186	+0.33%

The SA1 statistical area had a population of 186 in the 2023 New Zealand census, an increase of 3 people (1.6%) since the 2018 census, and an increase of 72 people (63.2%) since the 2013 census. There were 99 males and 90 females in 66 dwellings. 1.6% of people identified as LGBTIQ+. The median age was 49.7 years (compared with 38.1 years nationally). There were 33 people (17.7%) aged under 15 years, 30 (16.1%) aged 15 to 29, 87 (46.8%) aged 30 to 64, and 36 (19.4%) aged 65 or older.

People could identify as more than one ethnicity. The results were 93.5% European (Pākehā), 11.3% Māori, 1.6% Pasifika, and 4.8% Asian. English was spoken by 98.4%, Māori language by 1.6%, and other languages by 6.5%. No language could be spoken by 1.6% (e.g. too young to talk). The percentage of people born overseas was 9.7, compared with 28.8% nationally.

Religious affiliations were 16.1% Christian, 1.6% Buddhist, and 1.6% New Age. People who answered that they had no religion were 77.4%, and 6.5% of people did not answer the census question.

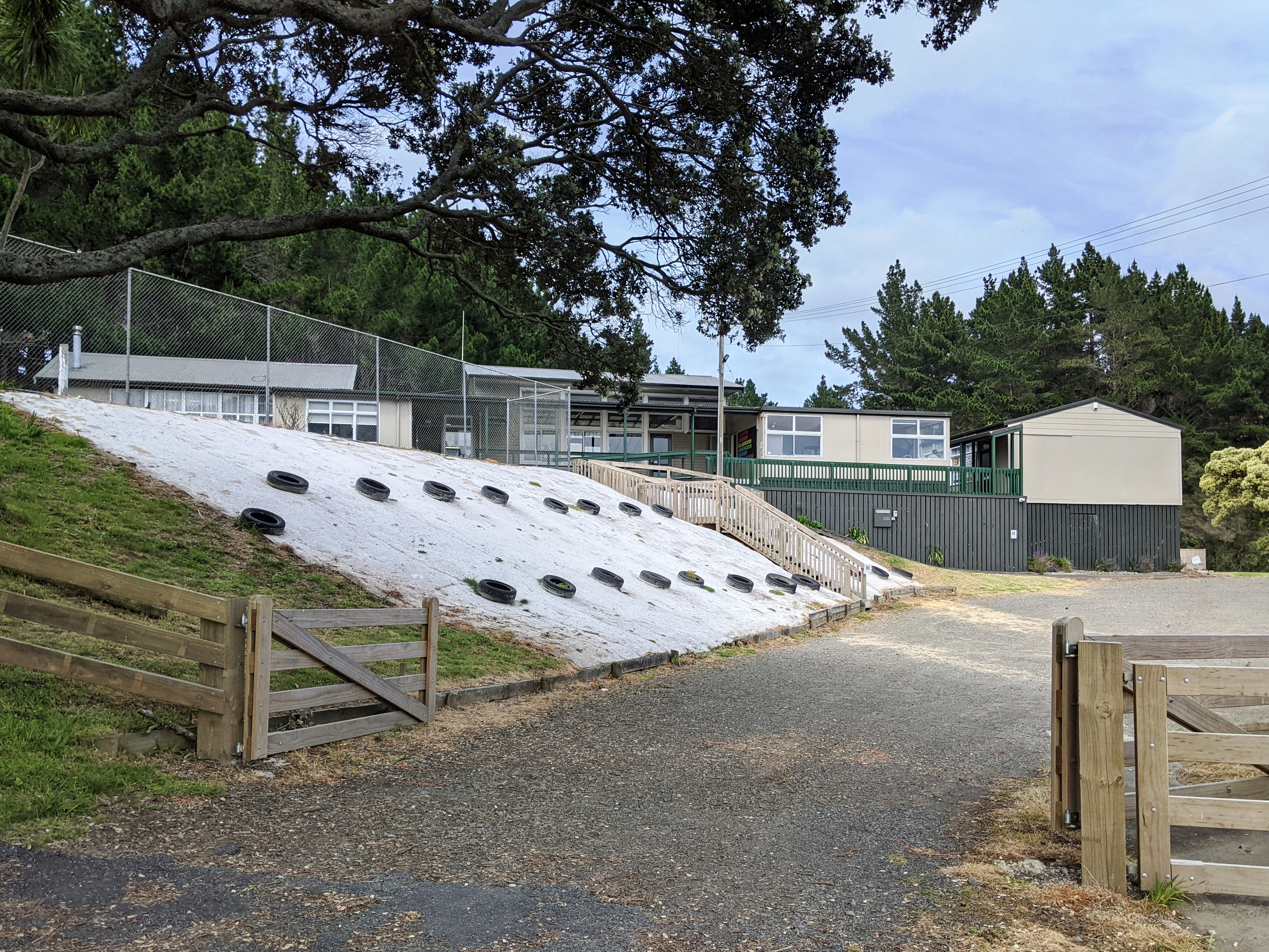
Waioneke School

Of those at least 15 years old, 15 (9.8%) people had a bachelor's or higher degree, 93 (60.8%) had a post-high school certificate or diploma, and 48 (31.4%) people exclusively held high school qualifications. The median income was $32,900, compared with $41,500 nationally. 12 people (7.8%) earned over $100,000 compared to 12.1% nationally. The employment status of those at least 15 was that 84 (54.9%) people were employed full-time and 27 (17.6%) were part-time.

== Education ==
Waioneke School is a coeducational full primary (years 1–8) school with a roll of 93 students as of July 2026. The school traces its origins to Mairetahi School, established in 1928. The school moved to its present site and took its current name in 1938.
