= Lake Kuwakatai =

Lake in New Zealand

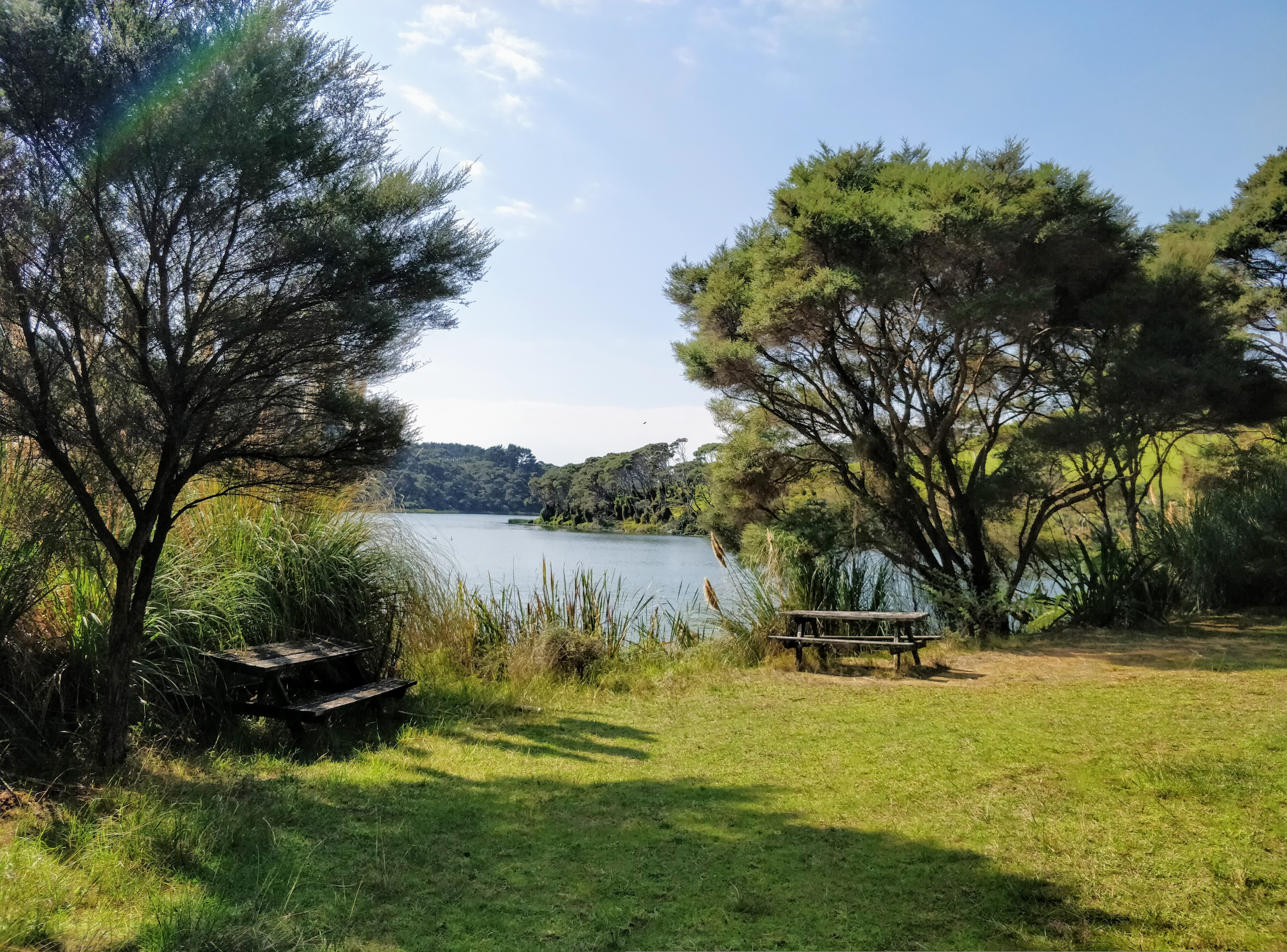
- April view of Lake Kuwakatai

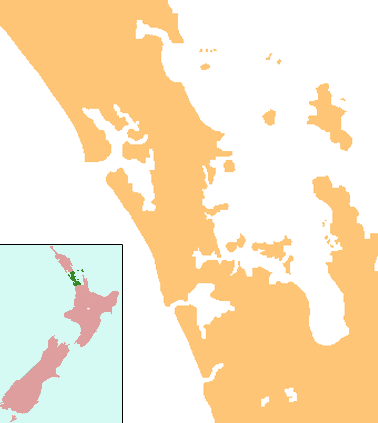
- Location within New Zealand Auckland
- Location: Auckland
- Coordinates: 36.527821°S 174.241276°E
- Primary outflows: none
- Basin countries: New Zealand
- Surface area: 36 hectares (89 acres)
- Surface elevation: 58 metres (190 ft)

Lake Kuwakatai is a small dune lake located on the south head of Kaipara Harbour in New Zealand. It is located 0.5 kilometres (0.31 mi) south of the larger Lake Rototoa. It has a surface area of 0.36 square kilometres (89 acres).
