= Helensville =

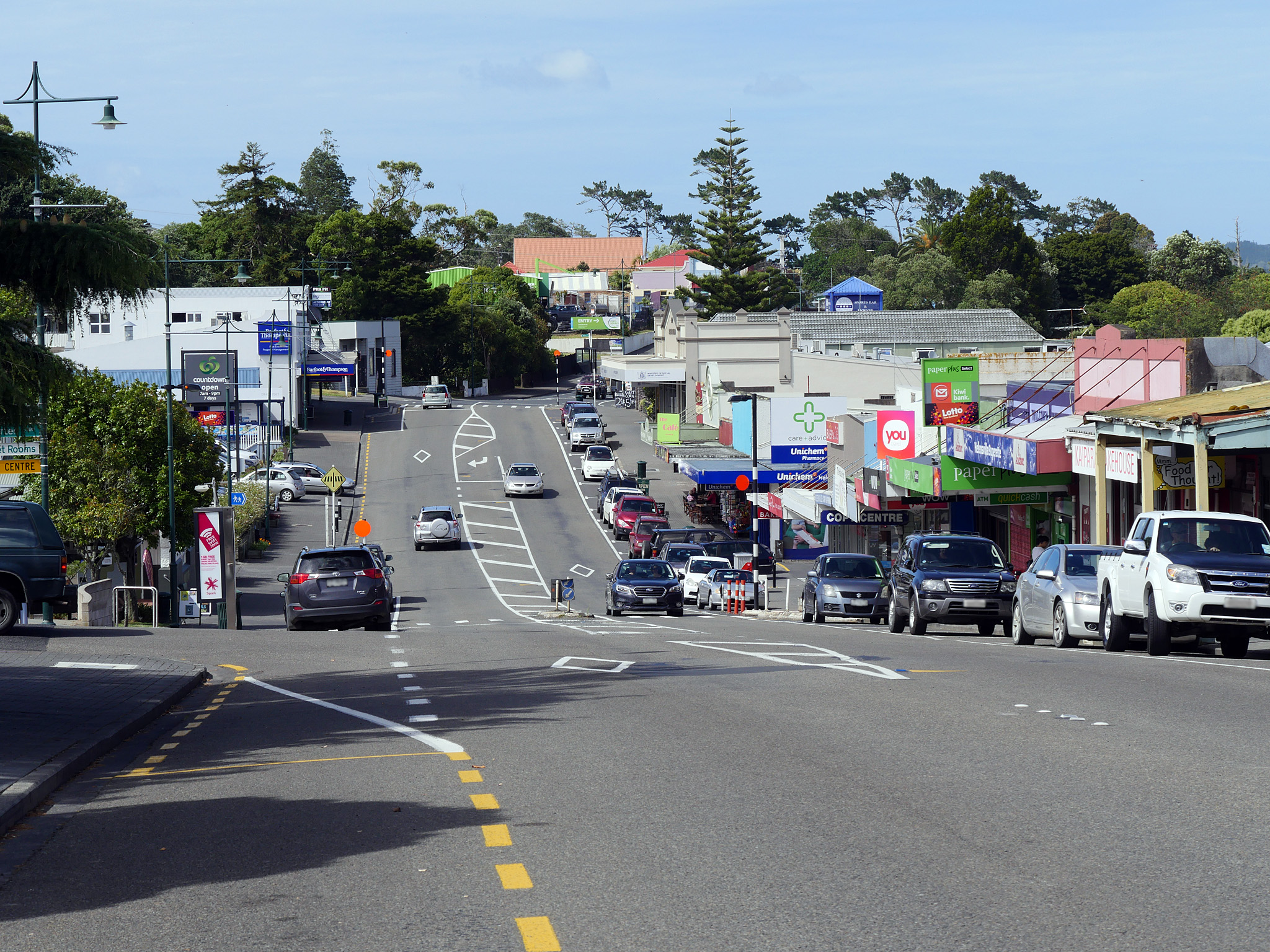
- Interactive map of Helensville
- Coordinates: 36°40′47″S 174°26′58″E
- Country: New Zealand
- Region: Auckland
- Ward: Rodney ward
- Community board: Rodney Local Board
- Subdivision: Kumeū subdivision
- Electorates: Kaipara ki Mahurangi; Te Tai Tokerau

Government
  - Territorial Authority: Auckland Council
  - Mayor of Auckland: Wayne Brown
  - Kaipara ki Mahurangi MP: Jessica Rowe
  - Te Tai Tokerau MP: TBD

Area
  - Total: 4.05 km^{2} (1.56 sq mi)

Population (June 2025)
  - Total: 3,540
  - Density: 874/km^{2} (2,260/sq mi)
- Postcode(s): 0800

Helensville (Māori: Te Awaroa) is a town in the North Island of New Zealand. It is sited 40 kilometres (25 mi) northwest of Auckland, close to the southern extremity of the Kaipara Harbour. State Highway 16 passes through the town, connecting it to Waimauku 16 kilometres (10 mi) to the south, and Kaukapakapa about 12 kilometres (7.5 mi) to the north-east. Parakai is two kilometres (1.2 mi) to the north-west. The Kaipara River runs through the town and into the Kaipara Harbour to the north.

Tāmaki Māori settled the southern Kaipara Harbour in the 13th or 14th centuries, drawn by the marine and forest resources. The upper reaches of the Kaipara River was the location of Te Tōangaroa, a portage where waka could be hauled between the Kaipara Harbour and the Waitematā Harbour. By the 15th century, the area had become home to some of the earliest pā sites in the Auckland Region. By the early 18th century, Ngāti Whātua, who had traditional ties to the area, had re-established themselves along the Kaipara River.

Helensville was established as a kauri logging settlement in 1862, developing into a regional centre for the south Kaipara by the 1870s. Helensville became a major centre for the dairy industry between 1911 and the 1980s.

== Etymology ==
The name Helensville comes from early settler John McLeod, and is a version of Helen's Villa, his house, that he named after his wife Helen Alexander. The Māori language name, Te Awaroa, means "The Wide River", and is the name of a tributary stream that meets the Kaipara River at Helensville.

== Geography ==
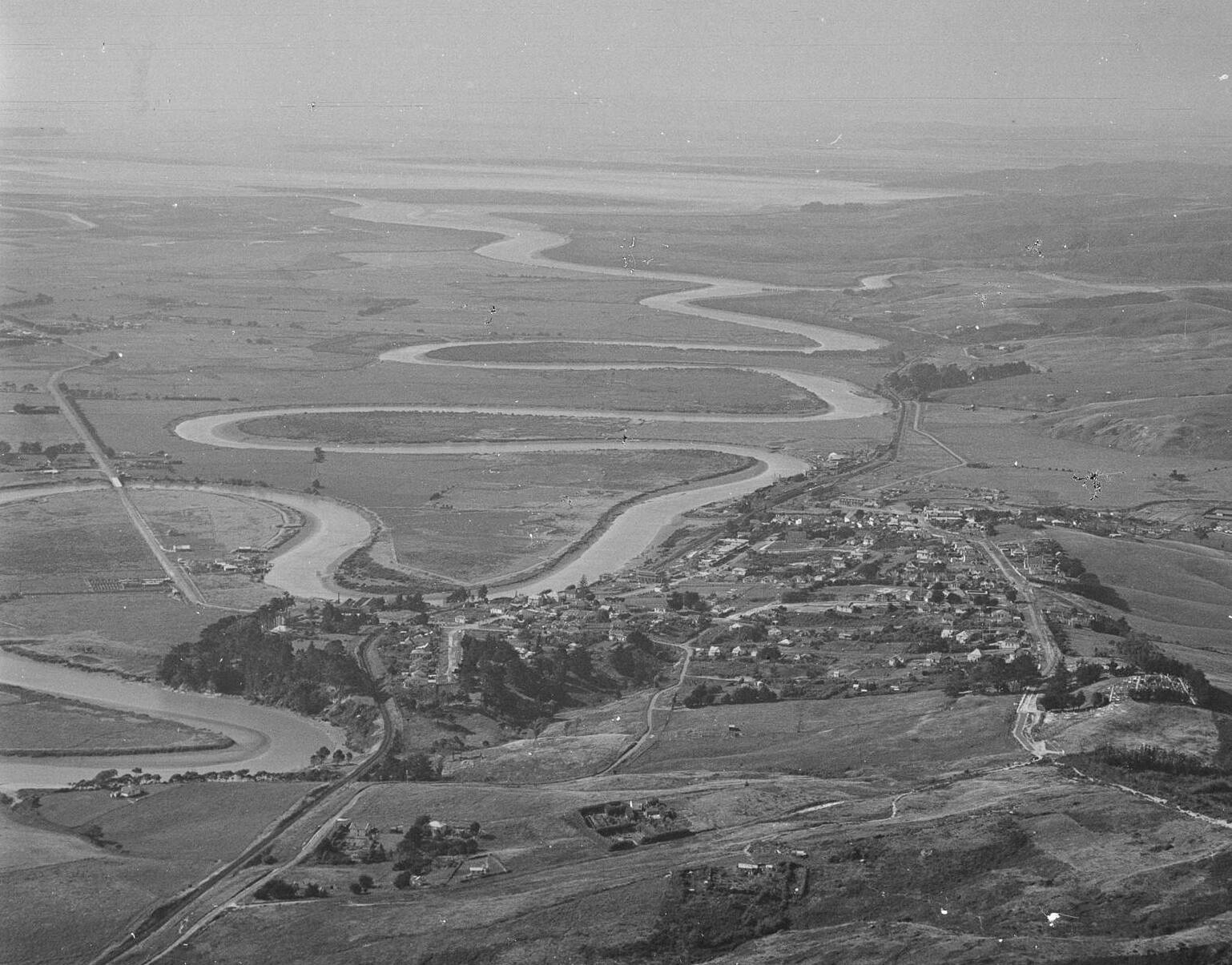
Helensville on the eastern shore of the Kaipara River

Helensville is located on the eastern banks of the Kaipara River, to the south of the Kaipara Harbour. The town is located between two tributaries of the river: the Awaroa Stream to the north, and the Mangakura Stream in the south. The town is located on a spur in the hills slightly higher than the surrounding area, of which the highest point is a 182 m (597 ft) hill located to the south called Paehoka, at the junction between Kiwitahi Road and Old North Road.

The area has traditionally been a wetland and flood plain for the Kaipara River, until the late 19th century when the Kaipara River catchment was developed into farmland. Historically, the hills to the east of Helensville were a kauri-dominated forest.

== History ==
=== Māori history ===
The Auckland Region has been settled by Māori since around the 13th or 14th centuries. Māori legends describe supernatural beings, the Tūrehu, as being the inhabitants of the area prior to Māori settlement. The Kaipara Harbour is associated with the Tūrehu Tumutumuwhenua and his wife Kui, of whom Ngāti Whātua (the modern-day iwi of the harbour) consider to be ancestors.

One of the earliest known iwi to settled in the area are Te Tini o Maruiwi, who descend from Maruiwi, captain of the Kahutara, one of the first migratory waka, and migrated north into the Kaipara Harbour. Ngāti Whātua traditions tell of the Māhuhu-ki-te-rangi migratory waka arriving at the Kaipara Harbour. Some of the crew members, including Rongomai, Mawete and Po, settled at Tāporapora, with the descendants of Toi, who already lived in the area. Tāporapora was a fertile sandy land that gradually eroded west of the Okahukura Peninsula, of which Manukapua Island is a remnant.

People were drawn to the southern Kaipara Harbour due to its rich resources from the harbour and surrounding kauri-dominated forests. Based on archaeological findings, many of the earliest people to come to the area caught moa. The southern Kaipara was an important transportation node due to Te Tōangaroa, a portage where waka could be hauled between the Kaipara Harbour and the Waitematā Harbour, via the Kaipara River and Kumeū River. Major settlements in the area were typically upland of the Kaipara River, due to the swampy ground immediately beside the river, and the Ohirangi wetlands (Te Tareminga were used to trap moa in ancient times).

Known traditional names for the area include Tungoutungou, which describes the meandering Kaipara River near Helensville, and further upstream near the Helensville Bridge was known as Te Pu a Tangihua.

Over time, many Tāmaki Māori developed the tribal identity Ngā Oho. Around the 15th century, a group known as Ngāti Awa who descended from the Mātaatua waka settled on the South Kaipara Peninsula, led by Tītahi. The iwi were prominent constructors of terraced pā. Ōtakanini pā, located near Parkhurst northwest of Helensville, has been dated to at least 1400AD.

By the mid-17th century, Ngāti Awa and Ngā Oho struggled to control territory. A descendant of Tītahi, Hauparoa, asked his relative Maki, a renowned warrior who lived at the Kāwhia Harbour, to help Ngāti Awa secure the region. Maki conquered and unified many of the Tāmaki Māori tribes, including Ngā Oho of the south Kaipara and West Auckland. After an incident where Maki unsuccessfully asked a slave steal kūmara from Hauparoa's storage pits, Maki attacked Ngāti Awa. Over time, Maki's descendants became known as Te Kawerau ā Maki; a name that references the kūmara incident. Maki chose the southern Kaipara as his base of operations, and his children migrated to different areas of the northern and western Auckland Region.

==== Return of Ngāti Whātua and the Musket Wars ====
In the 17th and early 18th centuries, Ngāti Whātua tribes began returning to the southern Kaipara Harbour area from Northland, primarily on the waka Te Potae o Wahieroa and Te Wharau. Initially relations between the iwi were friendly, and many important marriages were made. Hostilities broke out and Ngāti Whātua asked for assistance from Kāwharu, a famed Tainui warrior from Kawhia. Kāwharu's repeated attacks of the Waitākere Ranges settlements became known as Te Raupatu Tīhore, or the stripping conquest. Lasting peace between Te Kawerau ā Maki and Ngāti Whātua was forged by Maki's grandson Te Au o Te Whenua, who fixed the rohe (border) between Muriwai Beach and Rangitōpuni (Riverhead). Ngāti Whātua divided the land among different hapū, including Te Taoū, who were a major power in the Kaipara River catchment.

Around the year 1740, war broke out between Ngāti Whātua and Waiohua, the confederation of Tāmaki Māori tribes centred to the southeast, on the Tāmaki isthmus. Kiwi Tāmaki, paramount chief of Waiohua, led a surprise attack in the south Kaipara during an uhunga (funeral rite commemoration), in response for past grievances and to assist a Ngāti Whātua faction who were opposed to Te Taoū. Kiwi Tāmaki's party pursued the survivors south to the pā at Te Mākiri (Te Awaroa / Helensville), confronting Tuperiri and Waha-akiaki, two prominent members of Te Taoū who managed to survive. By 1741, Ngāti Whātua had successfully fought against Kiwi Tāmaki, and members of Te Taoū established themselves on the Auckland isthmus.

An early skirmish between Te Taoū and Ngāpuhi during the Musket Wars occurred at Paehoka, south of Helensville, likely in the late 18th century. Conflict continued through the early 19th century, and in 1818 English missionary Samuel Marsden witnessed Ngāti Whātua of the Kaipara River being attacked from the north. Following the battle of Te Ika a Ranganui at Kaiwaka, Ngāti Whātua fled the area, except for a small contingent who remained for ahi kā (visible land occupation). Ngāti Whātua began returning to the Kaipara River from 1828, and were fully re-established by 1835.

=== Early colonial era ===
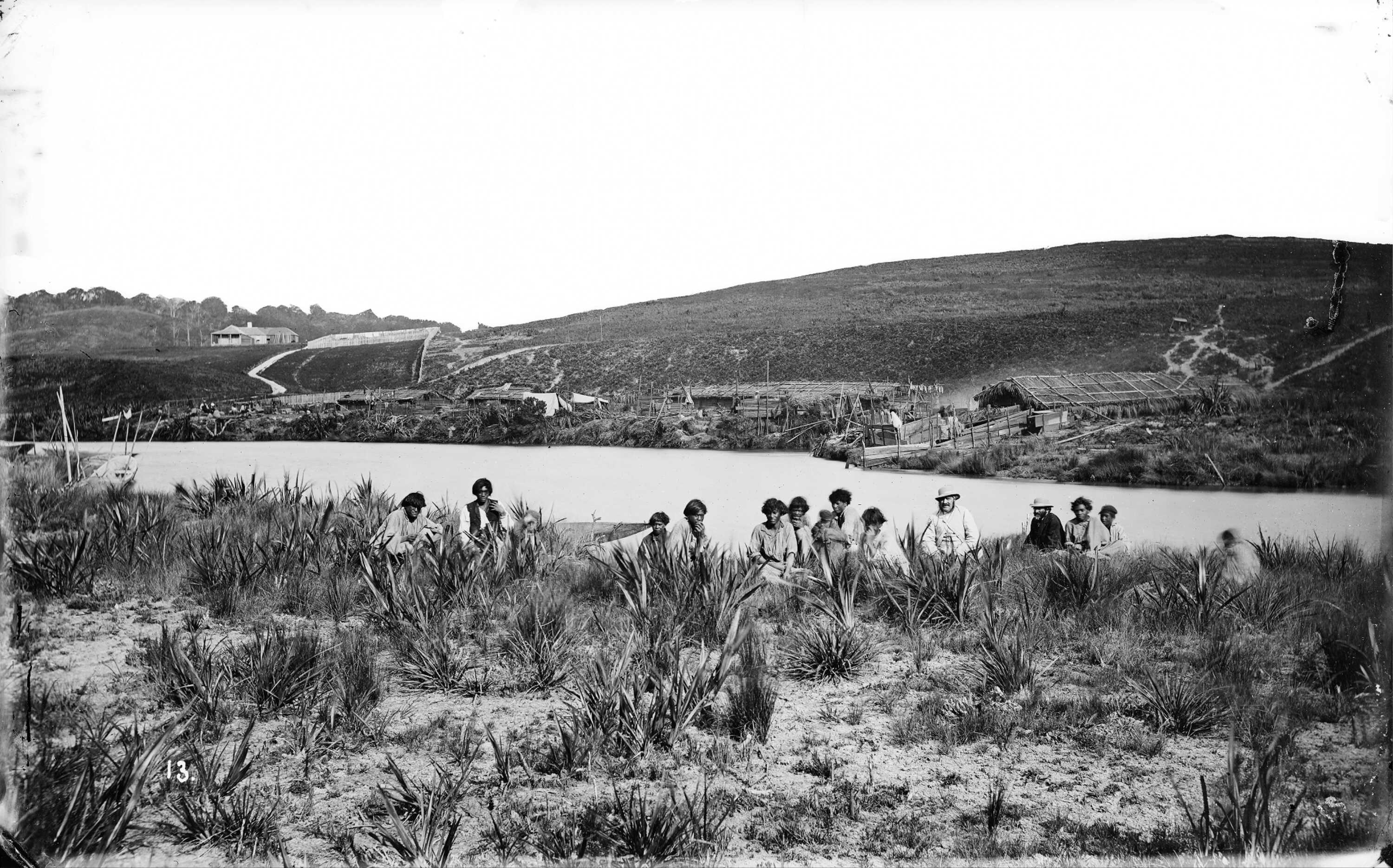
View of the Ngāti Whātua village adjacent to Helensville, with John McLeod's home, Helen's Villa, visible to the top-left (1863)

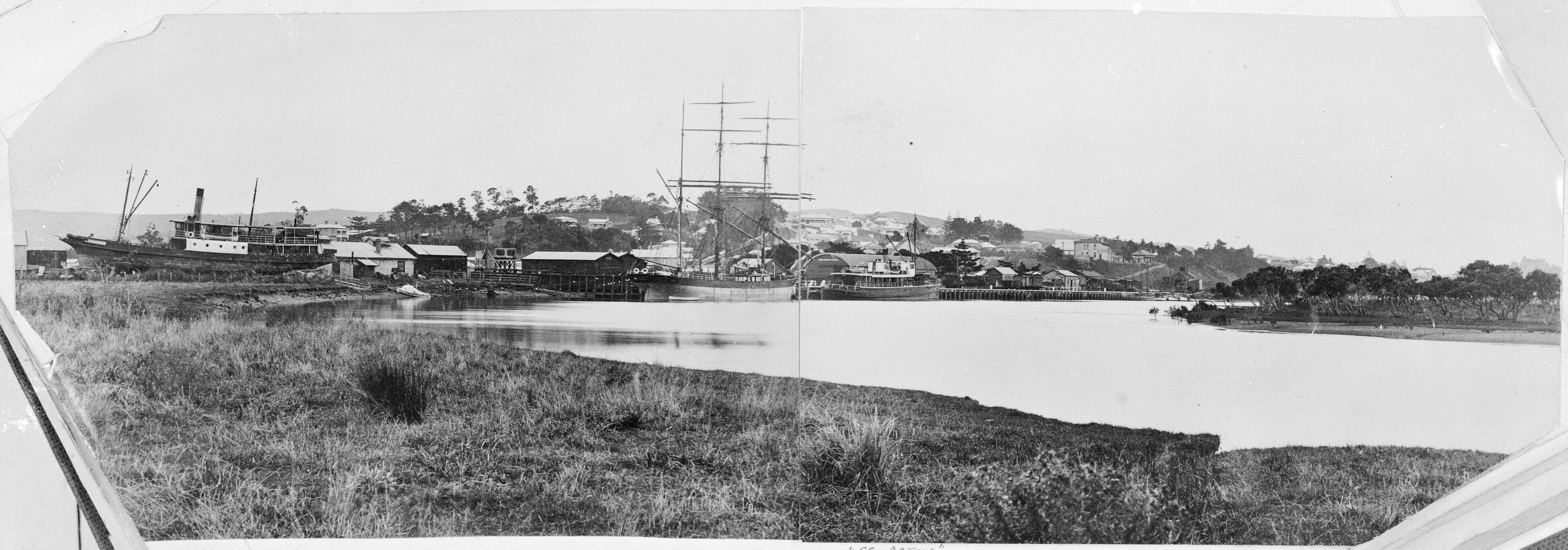
View of Helensville beyond the Kaipara River in 1912

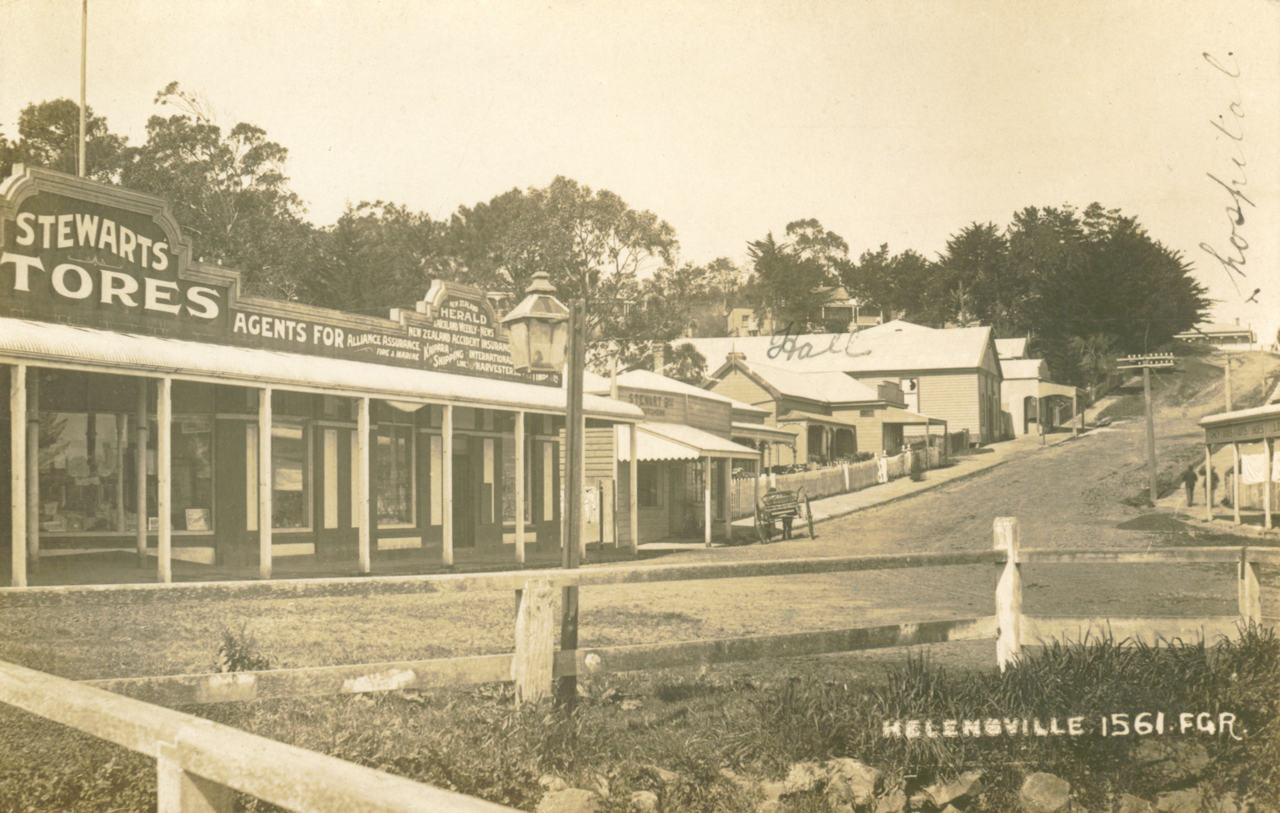
Helensville shops ca 1890

After the Treaty of Waitangi was signed in 1840, Ngāti Whātua operated coastal trading vessels, supplying goods to early European settlers at Auckland. Large areas of the southern Kaipara harbour were purchased by the Crown between 1853 and 1865, in part due to Ngāti Whātua's hope that this would lead to Europeans settlements developing and stimulate the economy of the area.

In 1862, Nova Scotian settler John McLeod established a kauri timber mill on the eastern banks of the Kaipara River, at the modern-day site of Helensville. McLeod named his house "Helen's Villa", after his wife, which became the name for the township that developed around the timber mill. McLeod milled the kauri on the lands adjacent to his timber mill, and after a few years, Ngāti Whātua established a kāinga on the opposite banks.

The town grew based on the kauri timber industry and kauri gum collection. In 1865, the road from Riverhead to Helensville was improved, and pastoral farms were developed in the 1870s. By 1870, Helensville had become the main trading centre and transportation junction for the Kaipara Harbour settlements to the north. From 1875 to 1881, a short-lived section of railway operated between Kumeū, south of Helensville, and the village of Riverhead, on the upper shores of the Waitematā Harbour. This led to increased economic activity in Helensville, which developed into a township and became an economic hub. In 1881, the North Auckland Line was extended to Helensville, leading to the opening of the Helensville railway station.

In 1879, St Matthew's Anglican Church was established in Helensville. This was the first church in the wider southern Kaipara area, serving the surrounding rural communities such as Kumeū and Waimauku. In 1882, the first bridge across the Kaipara River was constructed at Te Horo Point, with the intention of this opening up farmland to the west.

=== Dairy industry and settlement growth ===
The Kauri logging and gum industries went into decline by 1900, disappearing by 1920. The Helensville Show, an annual agricultural show, was established in 1900, becoming a major part of life at Helensville, and drawing people from the surrounding areas to the town. In 1911, the Kaipara Dairy Company was established in Helensville, becoming the town's largest employer, and the town flourished due to the dairy industry and sheep farms. Additionally, tourists were drawn to Helensville in the early 20th century, due to the Parakai thermal springs.

In 1927, St Matthew's Anglican Church was rebuilt after a new larger church was required. During the 1930s, an exotic pine forest called the Woodhill Forest was established on the South Kaipara Head, becoming an important industry for the area. During World War II, the 15th Battalion of the Home Guard was based at Helensville.

The dairy factory closed in the late 1980s, due to a decline in farming profitability in the area. The sand extraction industry became a major employer in the town, after Mt Rex and Winstone established processing facilities near the town in the 1990s.

== Demographics ==
Statistics New Zealand describes Helensville as a small urban area, which covers 4.05 km^{2} (1.56 sq mi) and had an estimated population of 3,540 as of June 2025, with a population density of 874 people per km^{2}.

Historical population for Helensville settlement
Year	Pop.	±% p.a.
2006	2,532	—
2013	2,673	+0.78%
2018	2,820	+1.08%
2023	3,279	+3.06%
The 2006 population is for a smaller area of 3.37 km^{2}. Source:

Helensville had a population of 3,279 in the 2023 New Zealand census, an increase of 459 people (16.3%) since the 2018 census, and an increase of 606 people (22.7%) since the 2013 census. There were 1,611 males, 1,650 females and 21 people of other genders in 1,182 dwellings. 2.9% of people identified as LGBTIQ+. The median age was 36.9 years (compared with 38.1 years nationally). There were 708 people (21.6%) aged under 15 years, 582 (17.7%) aged 15 to 29, 1,521 (46.4%) aged 30 to 64, and 471 (14.4%) aged 65 or older.

People could identify as more than one ethnicity. The results were 84.1% European (Pākehā); 21.0% Māori; 7.7% Pasifika; 5.7% Asian; 1.2% Middle Eastern, Latin American and African New Zealanders (MELAA); and 2.5% other, which includes people giving their ethnicity as "New Zealander". English was spoken by 96.4%, Māori language by 3.5%, Samoan by 1.0%, and other languages by 7.2%. No language could be spoken by 2.7% (e.g. too young to talk). New Zealand Sign Language was known by 0.5%. The percentage of people born overseas was 19.6, compared with 28.8% nationally.

Religious affiliations were 25.7% Christian, 0.9% Hindu, 0.3% Islam, 1.6% Māori religious beliefs, 0.7% Buddhist, 0.8% New Age, and 1.3% other religions. People who answered that they had no religion were 61.6%, and 7.3% of people did not answer the census question.

Of those at least 15 years old, 381 (14.8%) people had a bachelor's or higher degree, 1,446 (56.2%) had a post-high school certificate or diploma, and 633 (24.6%) people exclusively held high school qualifications. The median income was $42,800, compared with $41,500 nationally. 267 people (10.4%) earned over $100,000 compared to 12.1% nationally. The employment status of those at least 15 was that 1,374 (53.4%) people were employed full-time, 369 (14.4%) were part-time, and 63 (2.5%) were unemployed.

=== Rural surrounds ===
Helensville Rural statistical area surrounds the settlement and covers 56.41 km^{2} (21.78 sq mi). It had an estimated population of 1,690 as of June 2025, with a population density of 30 people per km^{2}.

Historical population for Helensville Rural
Year	Pop.	±% p.a.
2006	1,209	—
2013	1,302	+1.06%
2018	1,491	+2.75%
2023	1,620	+1.67%
The 2006 population is for a larger area of 56.92 km^{2}. Source:

Helensville Rural had a population of 1,620 in the 2023 New Zealand census, an increase of 129 people (8.7%) since the 2018 census, and an increase of 318 people (24.4%) since the 2013 census. There were 816 males, 801 females and 3 people of other genders in 528 dwellings. 2.6% of people identified as LGBTIQ+. The median age was 42.3 years (compared with 38.1 years nationally). There were 288 people (17.8%) aged under 15 years, 291 (18.0%) aged 15 to 29, 813 (50.2%) aged 30 to 64, and 228 (14.1%) aged 65 or older.

People could identify as more than one ethnicity. The results were 91.7% European (Pākehā); 12.0% Māori; 3.5% Pasifika; 4.4% Asian; 0.6% Middle Eastern, Latin American and African New Zealanders (MELAA); and 3.7% other, which includes people giving their ethnicity as "New Zealander". English was spoken by 97.2%, Māori language by 1.5%, Samoan by 0.4%, and other languages by 6.9%. No language could be spoken by 1.9% (e.g. too young to talk). New Zealand Sign Language was known by 0.7%. The percentage of people born overseas was 21.3, compared with 28.8% nationally.

Religious affiliations were 22.0% Christian, 0.2% Hindu, 0.4% Islam, 0.2% Māori religious beliefs, 0.9% Buddhist, 0.6% New Age, and 1.9% other religions. People who answered that they had no religion were 65.4%, and 8.9% of people did not answer the census question.

Of those at least 15 years old, 201 (15.1%) people had a bachelor's or higher degree, 783 (58.8%) had a post-high school certificate or diploma, and 297 (22.3%) people exclusively held high school qualifications. The median income was $47,600, compared with $41,500 nationally. 216 people (16.2%) earned over $100,000 compared to 12.1% nationally. The employment status of those at least 15 was that 762 (57.2%) people were employed full-time, 213 (16.0%) were part-time, and 27 (2.0%) were unemployed.

== Government ==
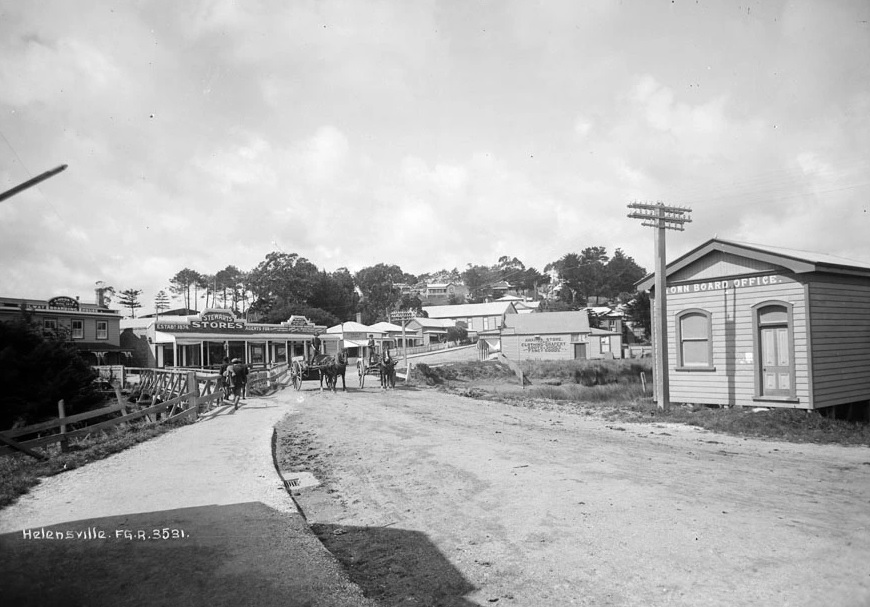
The Helensville Town Board offices, pictured in the 1910s

=== Local ===
From 1876 until 1947, Helensville was administered by the Waitemata County, a large rural county north and west of the city of Auckland. In 1883, the Helensville Town Board was formed to administer the area, within the Waitemata County. In 1947, Helensville split from the country to form an independent borough. In 1989, the borough merged with Rodney County, forming the Rodney District Council. Rodney District Council was amalgamated into Auckland Council in November 2010.

Within the Auckland Council, Helensville is a part of the Rodney local government area governed by the Rodney Local Board. It is a part of the Rodney ward, which elects one councillor to the Auckland Council.

=== Chairmen of the Helensville Town Board ===
Below is a list of the 18 people who served as the chairman of the Helensville Town Board, the longest of whom was Charles S. West, who served from 1922 to 1924, and again from 1929 to 1938. The final chairman, Reg Screaton, became the first Mayors of the Helensville Borough in 1947.

- 1883–1886 Isaac McLeod
- 1886–1888 Henry Ballans
- 1888–1890 Daniel Stewart
- 1890–1893 James McLeod
- 1893–1894 Daniel Stewart
- 1894–1898 Charles H. Spinley
- 1898–1899 J. J. Reynolds
- 1899–1902 Charles H. Spinley
- 1902–1904 Alfred Becroft
- 1904–1908 R. M. Cameron
- 1908–1910 James McLeod
- 1910–1912 James Stewart
- 1912–1914 James McLeod
- 1914–1916 E. T. Field
- 1916–1918 J. T. Lambert
- 1918–1922 James Stewart
- 1922–1924 Charles S. West
- 1924–1929 James Mackie
- 1929–1938 Charles S. West
- 1938–1941 A. H. Brackebnsh
- 1941–1941 Dr F. Matheson
- 1941–1944 J. A. Stanaway
- 1944–1945 K. A. Snedden
- 1945–1947 Reg Screaton

==== Mayors of the Helensville Borough Council ====
During the 42-year existence of Helensville Borough Council, it had eight mayors:

	Name	Term
1	Reg Screaton	1947–1950
2	Herbert Onslow Strong	1950–1953
3	Charles S. West	1953–1956
4	Lionel M. T. Wotton	1956–1961
5	Arthur B. West	1961–1968
6	G. C. Russell	1968–1974
7	George A. Smith	1974–1986
8	Eric J. Glavish	1986–1989

=== National ===
From 1978 until 2020, Helensville was in the Helensville general electorate. In 2020, this electorate was replaced by the Kaipara ki Mahurangi electorate. Helensville is within the Te Tai Tokerau Māori electorate.

== Economy ==
Formerly a forestry or dairy centre, Helensville is increasingly becoming a dormitory suburb of Auckland with an increasing number of lifestyle blocks in the area. There is some economic benefit from the wine producing region around Kumeū, 20 km to the south. The principal tourist attraction is the hot springs at nearby Parakai.

Helensville has its own locally produced monthly newspaper, the Helensville News.

The township is in the North West Country Inc business improvement district zone which represents businesses from Kaukapakapa to Riverhead.

== Education ==
Kaipara College is a secondary (years 9–13) school with a roll of 721 as of July 2026. The school began as Helensville District High School in 1924, and changed its name to Kaipara College in 1959.

Helensville Primary School is a full primary (years 1–8) school with a roll of 493 as of July 2026. It was founded in 1877.

Tau Te Arohanoa Akoranga is a satellite campus of the state-integrated Kingsway School, offering a Christian-based education.

All these schools are coeducational.

== Transport ==
Helensville railway station is on the North Auckland Line but the station has been closed since 2009. It is currently preserved as a museum and cafe.

== Notable people ==
- Charles Rose (1921-2017), New Zealand artist
- Jim Sheddan (1918–2010), Royal New Zealand Air Force Second World War flying ace

== Bibliography ==
- Diamond, John T.; Hayward, Bruce W. (1979). The Māori history and legends of the Waitākere Ranges. The Lodestar Press. ISBN 9781877431210.
- Diamond, John T.; Hayward, Bruce W. (1990). "Prehistoric Sites in West Auckland". In Northcote-Bade, James (ed.). West Auckland Remembers, Volume 1. West Auckland Historical Society. pp. 33–41. ISBN 0-473-00983-8.
- Dunsford, Deborah (2002). Doing It Themselves: the Story of Kumeu, Huapai and Taupaki. Huapai-Kumeu Lions Club. ISBN 0-473-08969-6.
- Paterson, Malcolm (2009). "Ko Ngā Kurī Purepure o Tāmaki, e Kore e Ngari i te Pō". In Macdonald, Finlay; Kerr, Ruth (eds.). West: The History of Waitakere. Random House. pp. 49–62. ISBN 9781869790080.
- Sheffield, C. M. (2011). Men Came Voyaging (4th ed.). Auckland: Longley Printing Company Ltd. ISBN 978-0-473-18059-1.
- Taua, Te Warena (2009). "He Kohikohinga Kōrero mō Hikurangi". In Macdonald, Finlay; Kerr, Ruth (eds.). West: The History of Waitakere. Random House. pp. 23–48. ISBN 9781869790080.
