= Parakai =

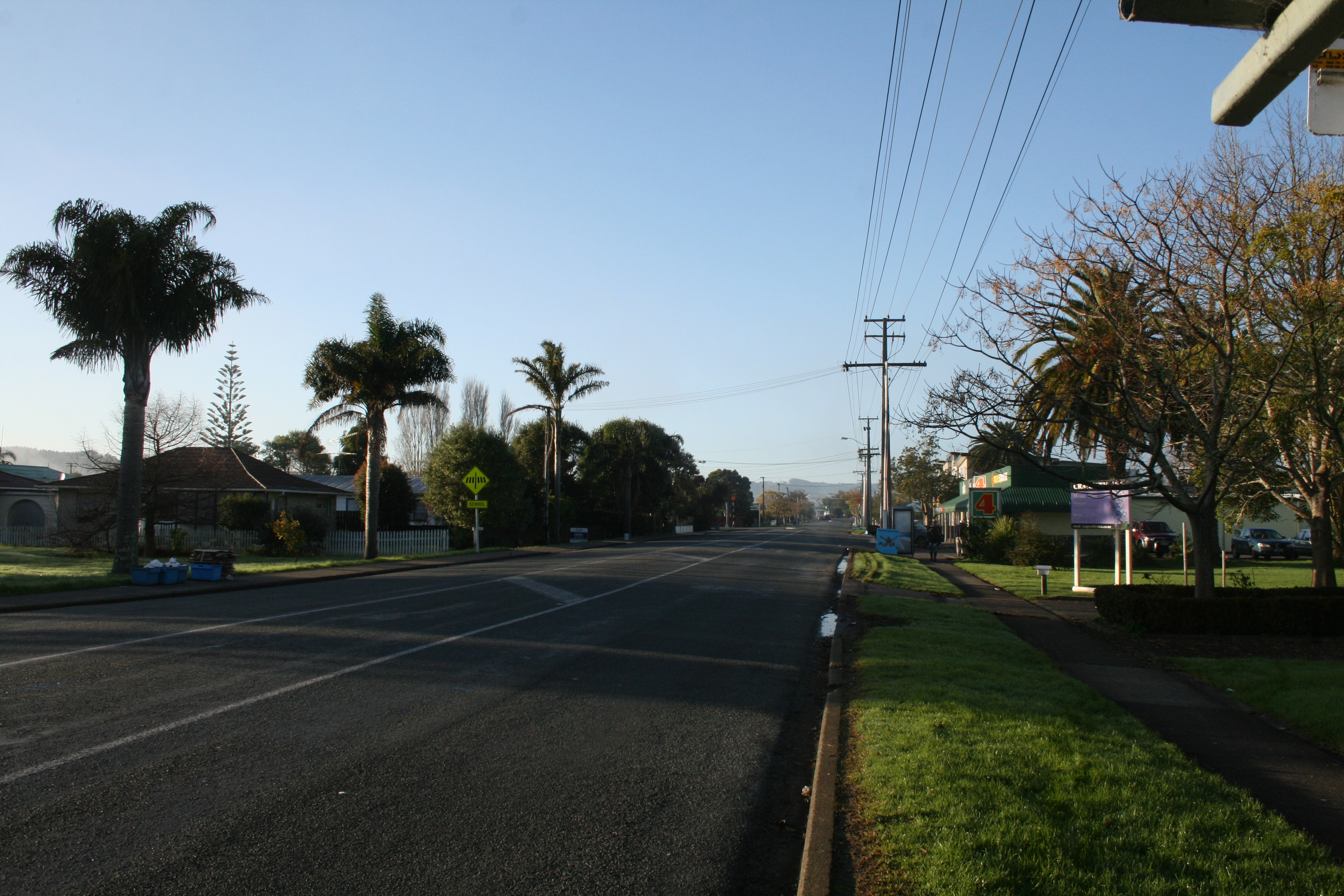
- Parakai
- Interactive map of Parakai
- Coordinates: 36.660441°S 174.432660°E
- Country: New Zealand
- Region: Auckland Region
- District: Parakai
- Local board: Rodney Local Board
- Subdivision: Kumeū subdivision
- Electorates: Kaipara ki Mahurangi; Te Tai Tokerau

Government
  - Territorial Authority: Auckland Council
  - Mayor of Auckland: Wayne Brown
  - Kaipara ki Mahurangi MP: Chris Penk
  - Te Tai Tokerau MP: Mariameno Kapa-Kingi

Area
  - Total: 1.45 km^{2} (0.56 sq mi)

Population (June 2025)
  - Total: 1,090
  - Density: 752/km^{2} (1,950/sq mi)

Parakai is a town in the North Island of New Zealand, sited 43 kilometres (27 miles) northwest of Auckland, close to the southern extremity of the Kaipara Harbour. Helensville is about 3 km (1.9 mi) to the south-east, and Waioneke is 22 km (14 mi) to the north-west.

The surrounding area, particularly to the north and west, consists of dairy farming, sheep farming and deer farming community. West Auckland Airport, a general aviation airfield, is 2 km north of Parakai. It is a popular airfield for parachuting.

== History and culture ==
=== Pre-European history ===
The Auckland Region has been settled by Māori since around the 13th or 14th centuries. The traditional name for the area was Kaipātiki, referring to the swampy flat land where flounder could be harvested. Parakai is within the rohe (tribal area) of Ngāti Whatua o Kaipara.

=== European settlement ===
The settlement was originally known as the Helensville Hot Springs in the early 20th century, when a hot spring resort was developed, becoming a tourist destination. As the resort, a new name was needed to differentiate it from Helensville in the south, when a post office was being established. The name Kaipara was favoured by residents, but due to the similarly named Kaipara Flats, a different name was needed, and the residents chose Parakai (a flipped version of Kaipara). The first references in newspapers to Parakai date from 1908. At one point in time the name Babylon Flats was used before being changed to Parakai.

Parakai Rugby Club existed between 1918 and 1937, before amalgamating with the Helensville Rugby club in 1943.

== Demographics ==
Statistics New Zealand describes Parakai as a small urban area, which covers 1.45 km^{2} (0.56 sq mi) and had an estimated population of 1,090 as of June 2025, with a population density of 752 people per km^{2}.

Historical population
Year	Pop.	±% p.a.
2006	831	—
2013	1,020	+2.97%
2018	1,098	+1.48%
2023	1,083	−0.27%

Parakai had a population of 1,083 in the 2023 New Zealand census, a decrease of 15 people (−1.4%) since the 2018 census, and an increase of 63 people (6.2%) since the 2013 census. There were 540 males, 534 females and 6 people of other genders in 360 dwellings. 3.3% of people identified as LGBTIQ+. The median age was 36.8 years (compared with 38.1 years nationally). There were 228 people (21.1%) aged under 15 years, 192 (17.7%) aged 15 to 29, 483 (44.6%) aged 30 to 64, and 177 (16.3%) aged 65 or older.

People could identify as more than one ethnicity. The results were 79.2% European (Pākehā); 25.8% Māori; 8.9% Pasifika; 8.0% Asian; 0.3% Middle Eastern, Latin American and African New Zealanders (MELAA); and 4.2% other, which includes people giving their ethnicity as "New Zealander". English was spoken by 97.0%, Māori language by 4.7%, Samoan by 0.8%, and other languages by 5.3%. No language could be spoken by 1.9% (e.g. too young to talk). New Zealand Sign Language was known by 0.6%. The percentage of people born overseas was 18.6, compared with 28.8% nationally.

Religious affiliations were 23.8% Christian, 1.1% Hindu, 0.3% Islam, 3.0% Māori religious beliefs, 0.3% Buddhist, and 1.1% other religions. People who answered that they had no religion were 62.3%, and 8.3% of people did not answer the census question.

Of those at least 15 years old, 81 (9.5%) people had a bachelor's or higher degree, 459 (53.7%) had a post-high school certificate or diploma, and 297 (34.7%) people exclusively held high school qualifications. The median income was $37,000, compared with $41,500 nationally. 51 people (6.0%) earned over $100,000 compared to 12.1% nationally. The employment status of those at least 15 was that 426 (49.8%) people were employed full-time, 117 (13.7%) were part-time, and 21 (2.5%) were unemployed.

== Governance ==
Parakai is part of the Local Government Rodney Ward of Auckland Council and is part of the Kumeu Subdivision of the Rodney Local Board. It is in the Kaipara ki Mahurangi general electorate and the Te Tai Tokerau Māori electorate.

== Education ==
Parakai School is a co-educational full primary school catering for years 1–8, with a roll of 216 students as of July 2026. The Parakai School community catchment area reaches from the immediate flats surrounding the Kaipara River and up the South Kaipara Heads Peninsula.

== Geothermal mineral pools ==
Parakai is noted for its hot springs with geothermal mineral water occurring naturally. There is a complex of mineral pools and recreational activities, such as Parakai Springs. These pools are fed from bores which draw from a geothermal aquifer which lies in the fractured Waitemata sandstone and compacted alluvial sediments.

There is little recorded history of Māori using these springs, though it is to be assumed that they were known as the local iwi Ngāti Whatua had made use of the springs in the neighbouring Helensville.

In 1864 Robert Mair discovered the hot springs, which at the time consisted of one natural hot pool. In 1905 a bore was sunk 20 metres and a year later a new bathhouse was built. This began twenty-five years of tourism and investment in the hot pools (and Parakai more widely) which, at its peak, included a Reserve which contained a Massage Institute, 24 private baths, and men's and women's swimming baths. The economic downturn of the Depression and onset of World War II caused visitor numbers to dwindle, and by 1958 two of the boarding houses had burned down, and the swimming baths were closed.
