= Mount Auckland =

Hill in North Auckland

- Atuanui / Mount Auckland
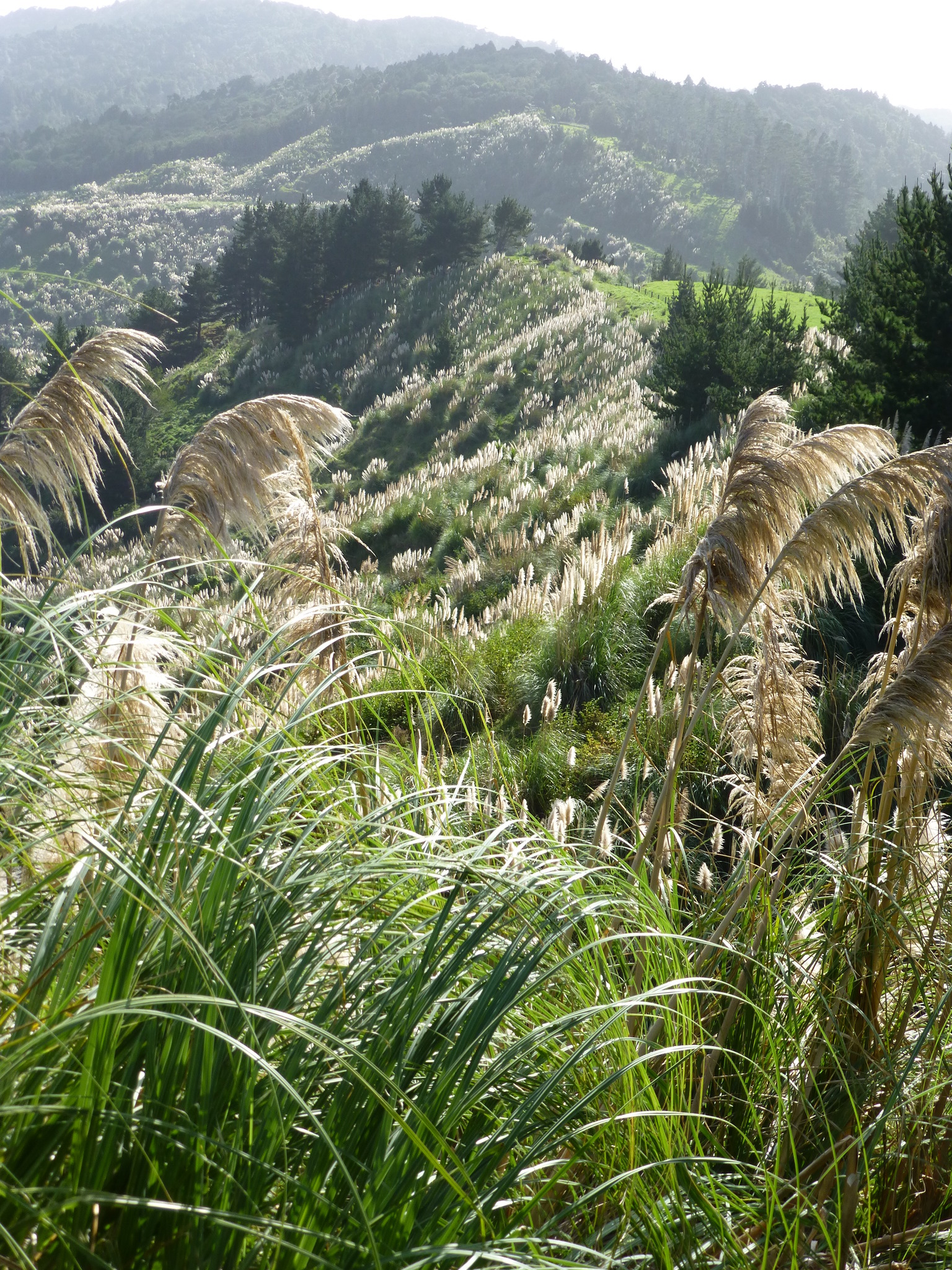
- Cortaderia selloana on Mount Auckland

Highest point
- Elevation: 304 m (997 ft)
- Coordinates: 36.446°S 174.456°E

Naming
- Native name: Atuanui (Māori)
- Defining authority: New Zealand Geographic Board

Geography

Mount Auckland (Māori: Atuanui), gazetted as Atuanui / Mount Auckland, is a hill in the northern Auckland region, near the shore of the Kaipara Harbour.

== Geography ==
Mount Auckland is a 304-metre tall mountain, adjacent to the mouth of the Hōteo River which enters into the Kaipara Harbour.

== History ==
The mountain was traditionally known by the name Atuanui by Tāmaki Māori, and holds spiritual significance to Ngāti Whātua. The summit is the location of a fortified pā, used during pre-European times for defense. The mountain's forests were logged for kauri wood in the mid-19th century, and first received a protected status in 1887, as a state timber reserve.

The mountain is the first known location where Danhatchia australis, an orchid species native to Australia and New Zealand, was first formally identified in 1962.

In 2013 Mount Auckland was given a dual name as part of a Treaty of Waitangi settlement with Ngāti Whatua. This was to recognise the significance of the mountain to the iwi, who see it as an ancestral mountain and who have formerly built Pā on it. As part of the settlement, the name Mount Auckland was officially replaced with the dual name of Atuanui / Mount Auckland.

Since 2018 public access has been restricted in order to prevent kauri dieback. In 2019 a fund was established to support the development of a tool that would help researches detect kauri dieback on the hill before visual symptoms were present.
