= Shelly Beach, New Zealand =

Shelly Beach
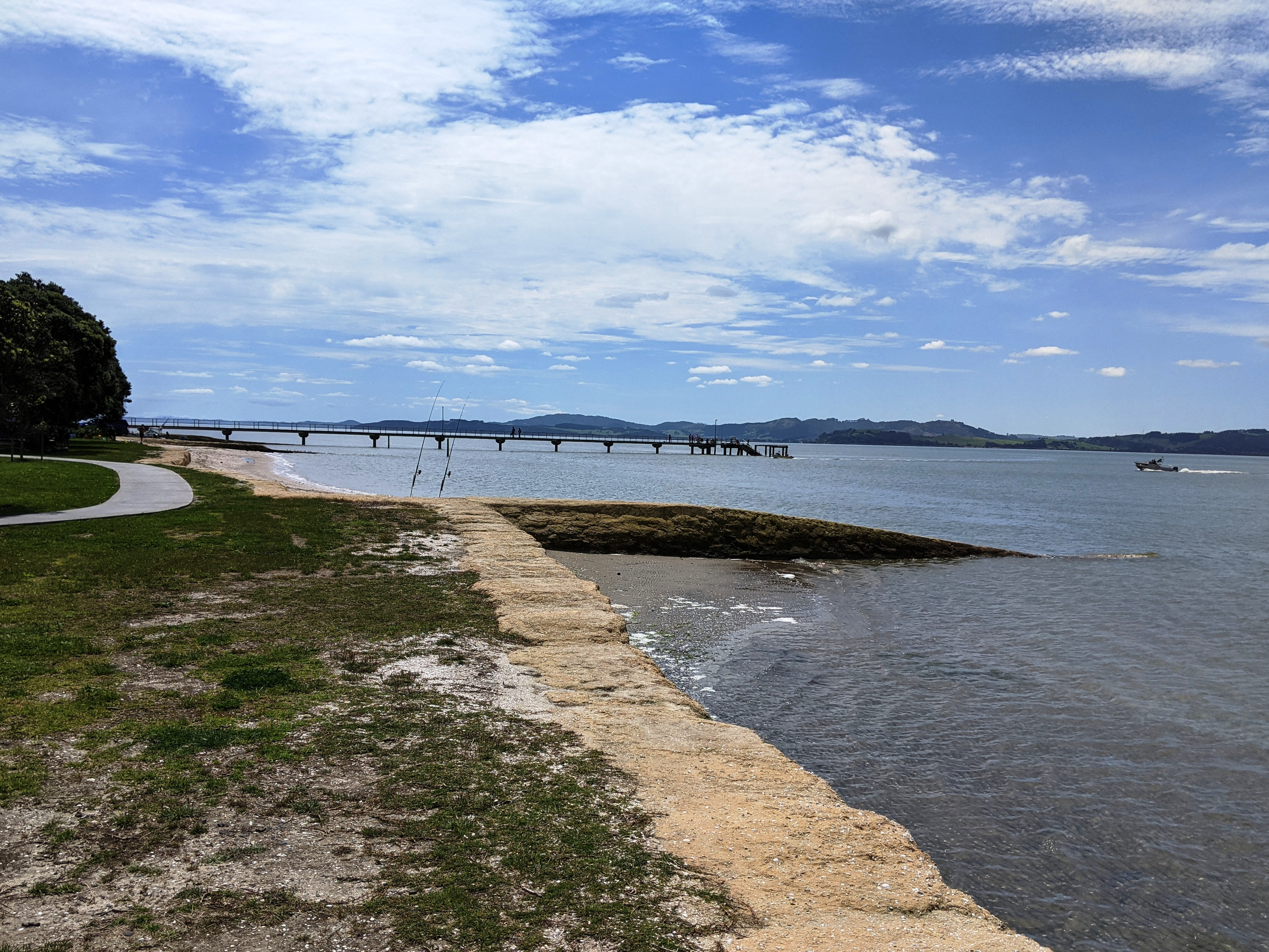
- Jetty at Shelly Beach
- Interactive map of Shelly Beach
- Coordinates: 36°34′20″S 174°22′45″E
- Country: New Zealand
- Region: Auckland Region
- Ward: Rodney ward
- Community board: Rodney Local Board
- Subdivision: Kumeū subdivision
- Electorates: Kaipara ki Mahurangi; Te Tai Tokerau

Government
  - Territorial Authority: Auckland Council
  - Mayor of Auckland: Wayne Brown
  - Kaipara ki Mahurangi MP: Chris Penk
  - Te Tai Tokerau MP: Mariameno Kapa-Kingi

Area
  - Total: 0.31 km^{2} (0.12 sq mi)

Population (June 2025)
  - Total: 290
  - Density: 940/km^{2} (2,400/sq mi)

Shelly Beach is a settlement located on the eastern side of the South Kaipara Head and the southwest side of Kaipara Harbour, North Auckland. The settlement is centred around an eponymous beach. In 2018, a seawall and five groynes were constructed to fight erosion.

== Beach ==
The official name of the beach is Aotea / Shelly Beach. The name Aotea is derived from the traditional Tāmaki Māori name for the beach, Te Aukahanga o Aotea ("The Lashing of the Top Boards to the Hull of the Aotea"), recalls the visit of the Aotea migratory waka before the crew left for the south.

In 1884, a Ngāti Whātua parliament was held at the beach, chaired by Paora Tūhaere.

== Demographics ==
Statistics New Zealand describes Shelly Beach as a rural settlement, which covers 0.31 km^{2} (0.12 sq mi) and had an estimated population of 290 as of June 2025, with a population density of 935 people per km^{2}. Shelly Beach is part of the larger South Head statistical area.

Historical population
Year	Pop.	±% p.a.
2006	153	—
2013	231	+6.06%
2018	249	+1.51%
2023	273	+1.86%

Shelly Beach had a population of 273 in the 2023 New Zealand census, an increase of 24 people (9.6%) since the 2018 census, and an increase of 42 people (18.2%) since the 2013 census. There were 138 males and 138 females in 105 dwellings. 2.2% of people identified as LGBTIQ+. The median age was 48.7 years (compared with 38.1 years nationally). There were 51 people (18.7%) aged under 15 years, 24 (8.8%) aged 15 to 29, 144 (52.7%) aged 30 to 64, and 57 (20.9%) aged 65 or older.

People could identify as more than one ethnicity. The results were 89.0% European (Pākehā); 17.6% Māori; 6.6% Pasifika; 2.2% Asian; and 1.1% Middle Eastern, Latin American and African New Zealanders (MELAA). English was spoken by 100.0%, Māori language by 2.2%, Samoan by 1.1%, and other languages by 7.7%. New Zealand Sign Language was known by 1.1%. The percentage of people born overseas was 20.9, compared with 28.8% nationally.

Religious affiliations were 17.6% Christian, 1.1% Islam, 1.1% Māori religious beliefs, 1.1% Buddhist, and 1.1% New Age. People who answered that they had no religion were 67.0%, and 12.1% of people did not answer the census question.

Of those at least 15 years old, 18 (8.1%) people had a bachelor's or higher degree, 138 (62.2%) had a post-high school certificate or diploma, and 66 (29.7%) people exclusively held high school qualifications. The median income was $36,800, compared with $41,500 nationally. 30 people (13.5%) earned over $100,000 compared to 12.1% nationally. The employment status of those at least 15 was that 108 (48.6%) people were employed full-time, 30 (13.5%) were part-time, and 6 (2.7%) were unemployed.
