= Lake Keretā =

Lake in New Zealand

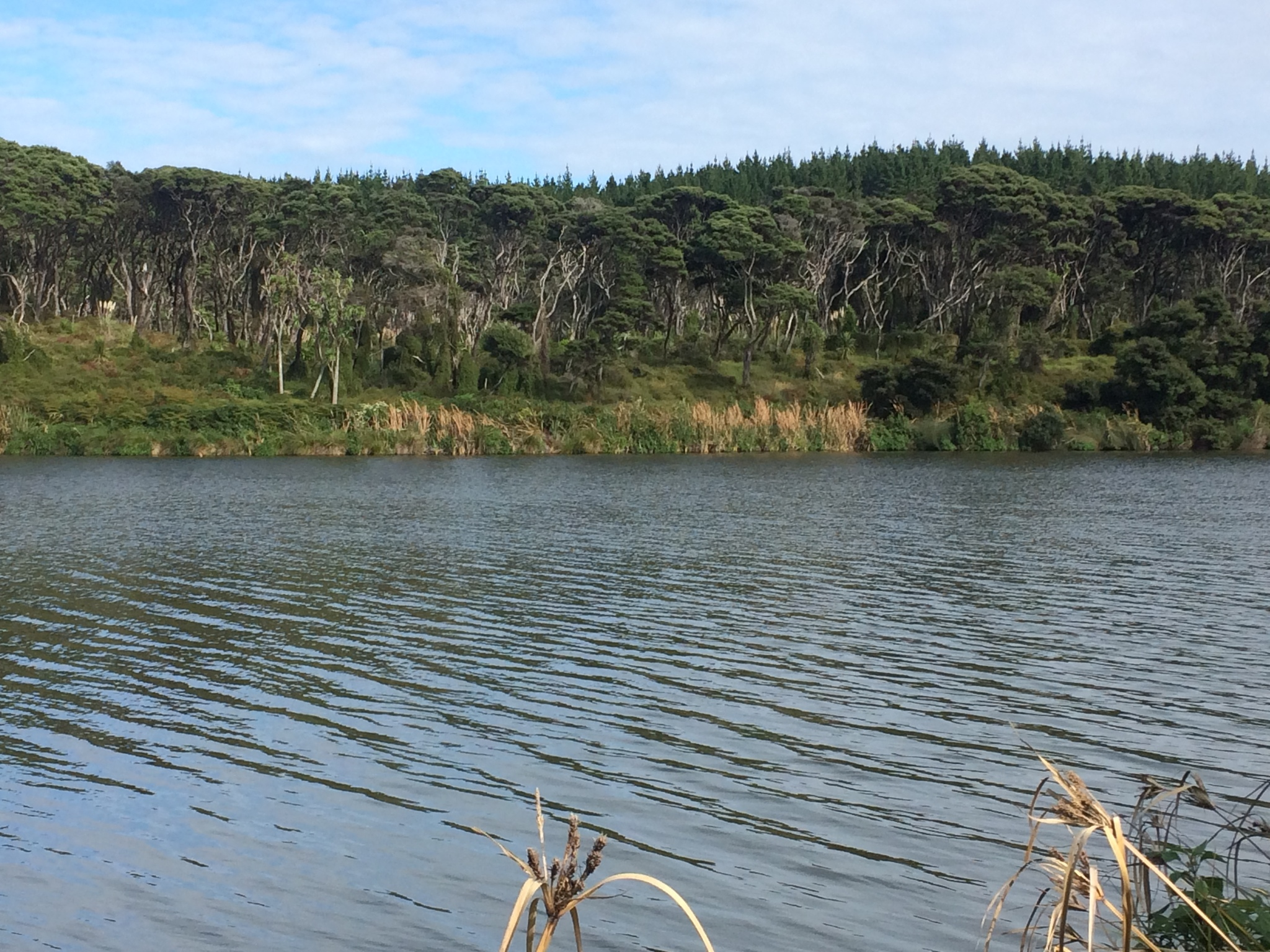
- Kunzea robusta (rawirinui) along the shores of Lake Keretā

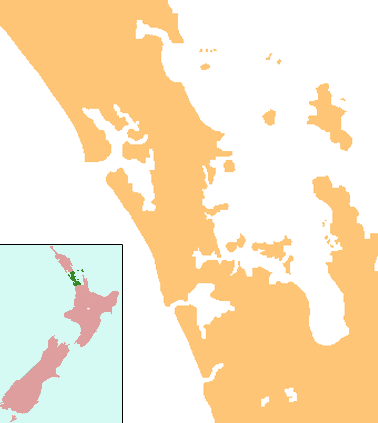
- Location within New Zealand Auckland
- Location: Auckland Region, North Island, New Zealand
- Coordinates: 36.5935°S 174.2811°E
- Primary inflows: None
- Primary outflows: None
- Basin countries: New Zealand
- Surface area: 32 ha (79 acres)
- Max. depth: 1.5 metres (4 ft 11 in)

Lake Keretā lies at the South Head peninsula of the Kaipara Harbour, in the Rodney District, along the west coast of the North Island of New Zealand. The surface area of the lake is about 32 hectares (79 acres) with a maximum depth of 1.5 metres (4 ft 11 in) and water temperature of about 21.1 °C (70.0 °F).

The lake is shallow and less than 250 metres (820 ft) wide, stretching slightly more than one kilometre (0.62 mi) in a north-westerly direction; there are no streams or rivers flowing into or out of it. It is primarily filled by underground water, and losses are due to evaporation from the surface of the lake.

== See also ==
- List of lakes of New Zealand
