= Arapārera River =

River in the Auckland Region, New Zealand

- Mouth of the Araparera River Arapārera River (New Zealand)
- Route of the Arapārera River

Location
- Country: New Zealand
- Region: Auckland Region

Physical characteristics
- Source
  - location: Moir Hill
  - coordinates: 36.4729°S 174.602°E
- Mouth: Kaipara Harbour
  - coordinates: 36.50836°S 174.43564°E

Basin features
- Progression: Arapārera River → Kaipara Harbour → Tasman Sea
- Tributaries
  - right: Kotorengaru Stream, Wainui Stream

The Arapārera River is a small river in the Auckland Region, New Zealand. It flows west into a southeastern arm of Kaipara Harbour.

== See also ==
- List of rivers of New Zealand
