= Hōteo River =

River in the Auckland Region, New Zealand

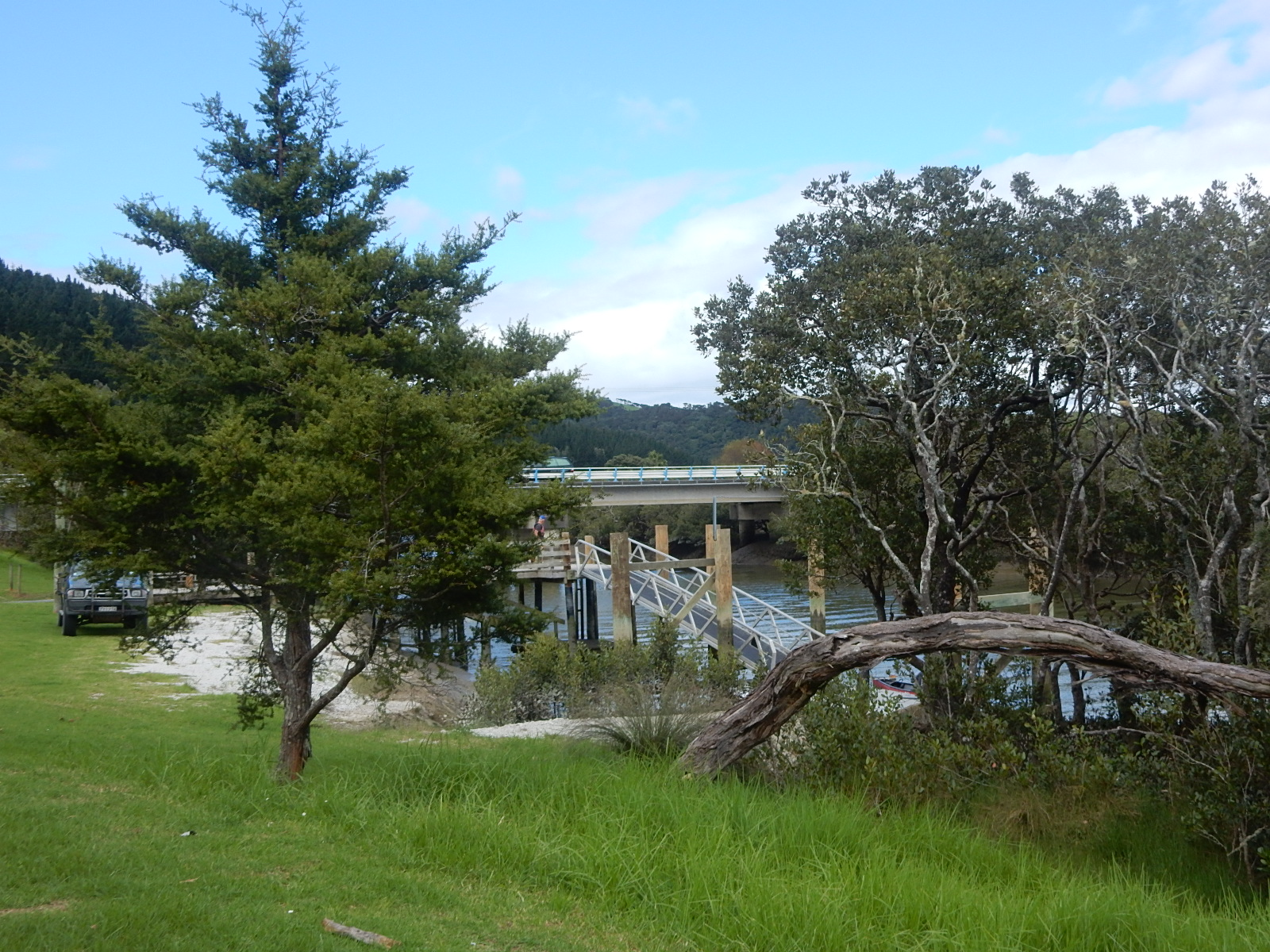
- The Hōteo River as it reaches the Mangakura Inlet

- Mouth of the Hōteo River Hōteo River (New Zealand)
- Route of the Hōteo River
- Native name: Te Awa o Hōteo

Location
- Country: New Zealand
- Region: Auckland Region

Physical characteristics
- Source
  - location: Confluence of the Whangaripo Stream and Waiteitei Stream
  - coordinates: 36.2721°S 174.57606°E
- Mouth: Mangakura Inlet
  - coordinates: 36.4242°S 174.4442°E
- Length: 52 kilometres (32 mi)
- Basin size: 405 km^{2} (156 sq mi)
- Discharge
  - average: 11 m^{3}/s (390 cu ft/s)

Basin features
- Progression: Hōteo River → Mangakura Inlet → Kaipara Harbour → Tasman Sea
- Tributaries
  - left: Waiwhiu Stream, Awarere Stream, Kaitoto Stream, Mangatu Stream
- Bridges: Mangakura Bridge

The Hōteo River is a river of the Auckland Region of New Zealand. It flows southwest from its sources close to the North Auckland Peninsula's east coast before emptying into the southern lobe of the Kaipara Harbour.

== Description ==
The headwaters of the Hōteo River is the Waitapu Stream that starts within 5 km (3.1 mi) of the East Coast and the system drains out into the West Coast of Northland. The Hoteo forms at the confluence of the Whangaripo and Waiteitei streams, flowing southwest through the Wayby Valley.

State Highway 1 crosses the river at Wayby, south of Wellsford and State Highway 16 crosses the river near Mangakura where it discharges into the Kaipara Harbour. The North Auckland Rail Line crosses the Hoteo River three times within 1.5 km (0.93 mi); to the north of Kaipara Flats.

The river enters the Kaipara Harbour near the town of Glorit. The lower reaches of the river are popular with whitebaiters and recreational fishermen and the river also hosts the annual Hōteo River Raft Race, a no-holds-barred event.

Two waterfalls are found on the Hōteo River to the east of Mangakura: the Tarakihi Rapids and the Paraua Rapids.

== Geology ==
The river is an antecedent drainage stream. The river began flowing when the surrounding lands were a low-lying plain. Over time, the surrounding land was uplifted, but the Hoteo River retained the same course, creating a gorge through the uplifting rock.

== History ==
The Hōteo River was a traditional rohe (border) marker for the iwi (tribe) Ngāti Manuhiri's northernmost lands.

The river mouth is a mooring point for motorboats, and the river is navigable 7.6 km (4.7 mi) inland from the Mangakura Bridge as far as the Paraua and Tarakihi rapids, two rapid systems which only exist at low tide.

== See also ==
- List of rivers of New Zealand
