= Lake Rototoa =

Lake in the North Island of New Zealand

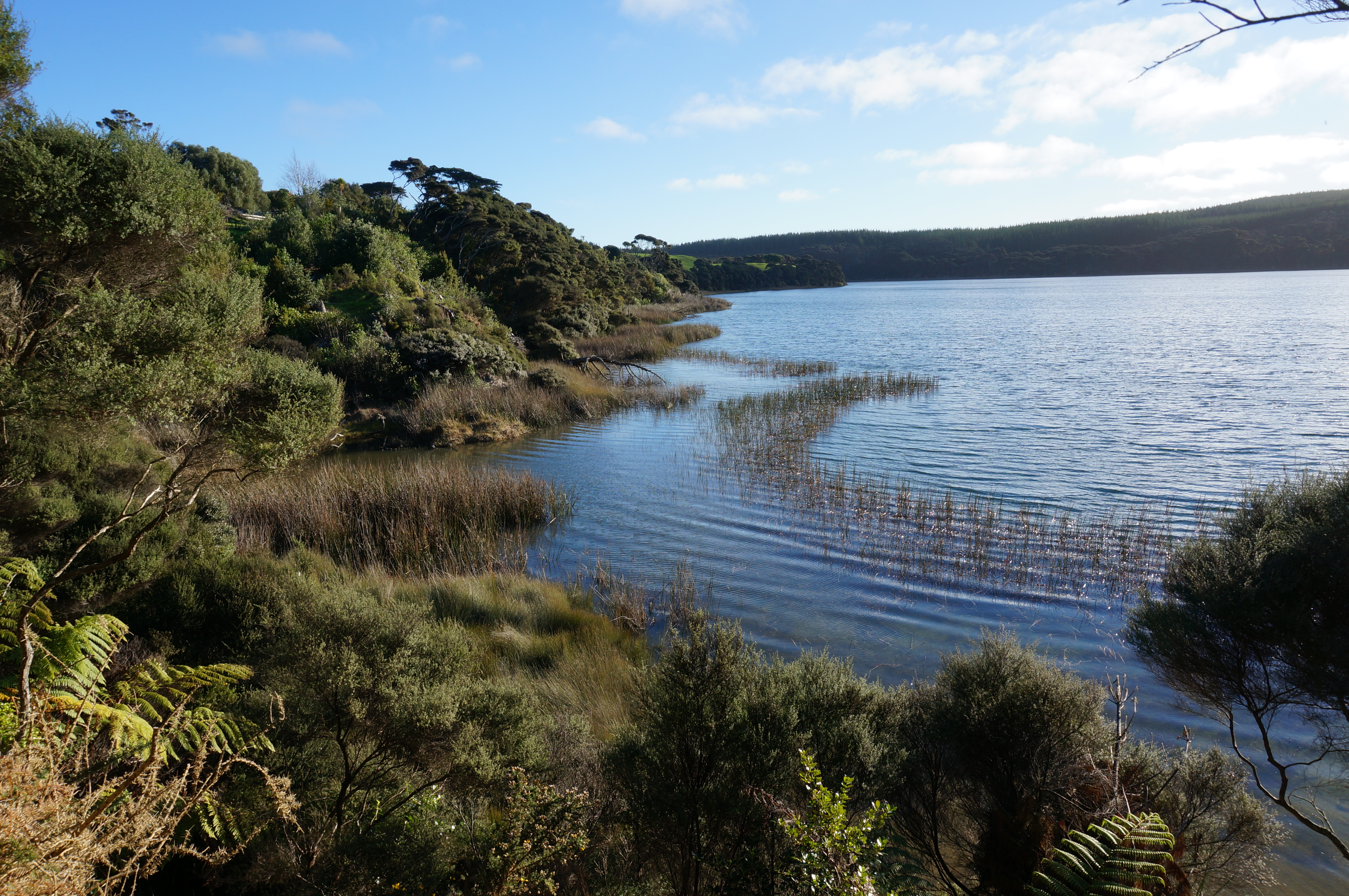
- Lake Rototoa

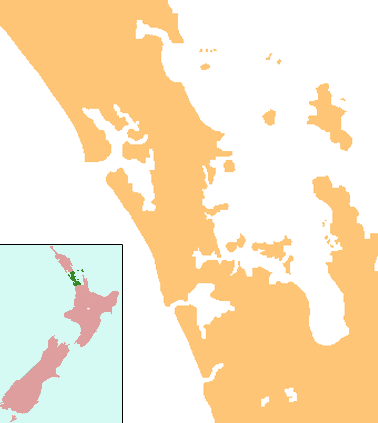
- Location within New Zealand Auckland
- Interactive map of Lake Rototoa
- Location: Auckland Region, North Island
- Coordinates: 36.5135°S 174.2375°E
- Basin countries: New Zealand
- Surface area: 1.39 km^{2} (0.54 sq mi)
- Max. depth: 26 m (85 ft)

Lake Rototoa (formerly Lake Ototoa) is located at the northern end of the south head of the Kaipara Harbour in the Rodney ward of the Auckland Region, New Zealand. With a surface area of 1.39 km^{2} and a maximum depth of 26 m, it is the largest and deepest of a series of sand-dune lakes found along the western coastline of the North Island.

Its name was changed from Lake Ototoa to Lake Rototoa in 2013. Rototoa translates as 'Lake of the Warrior', and is part of a line of lakes known as 'the Footsteps of Kawharu' after the warrior Kawharu who fought with the Ngāti Whātua tribe against the resident Waiohua, Ngaririki and Kawerau tribes in the late 17th to early 18th centuries.

== Biodiversity ==
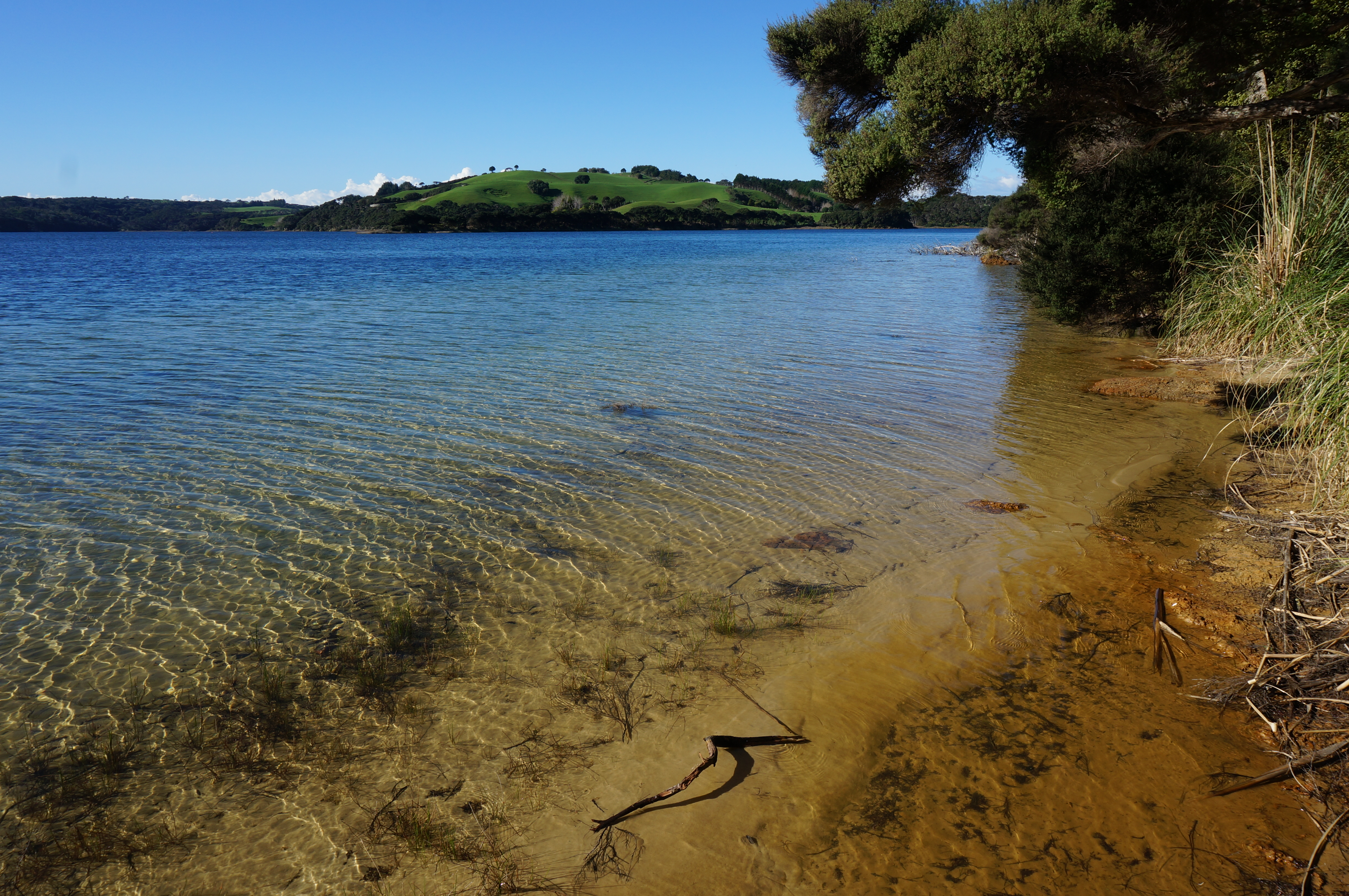
Lake Rototoa

The lake is an important wildlife habitat for a number of New Zealand bird species, including the New Zealand grebe, New Zealand scaup and grey duck. The lake is vegetated with Typha orientalis and Eleocharis sphacelata.

== See also ==
- List of lakes in New Zealand
