= Woodhill Forest =

Forest in Auckland, New Zealand

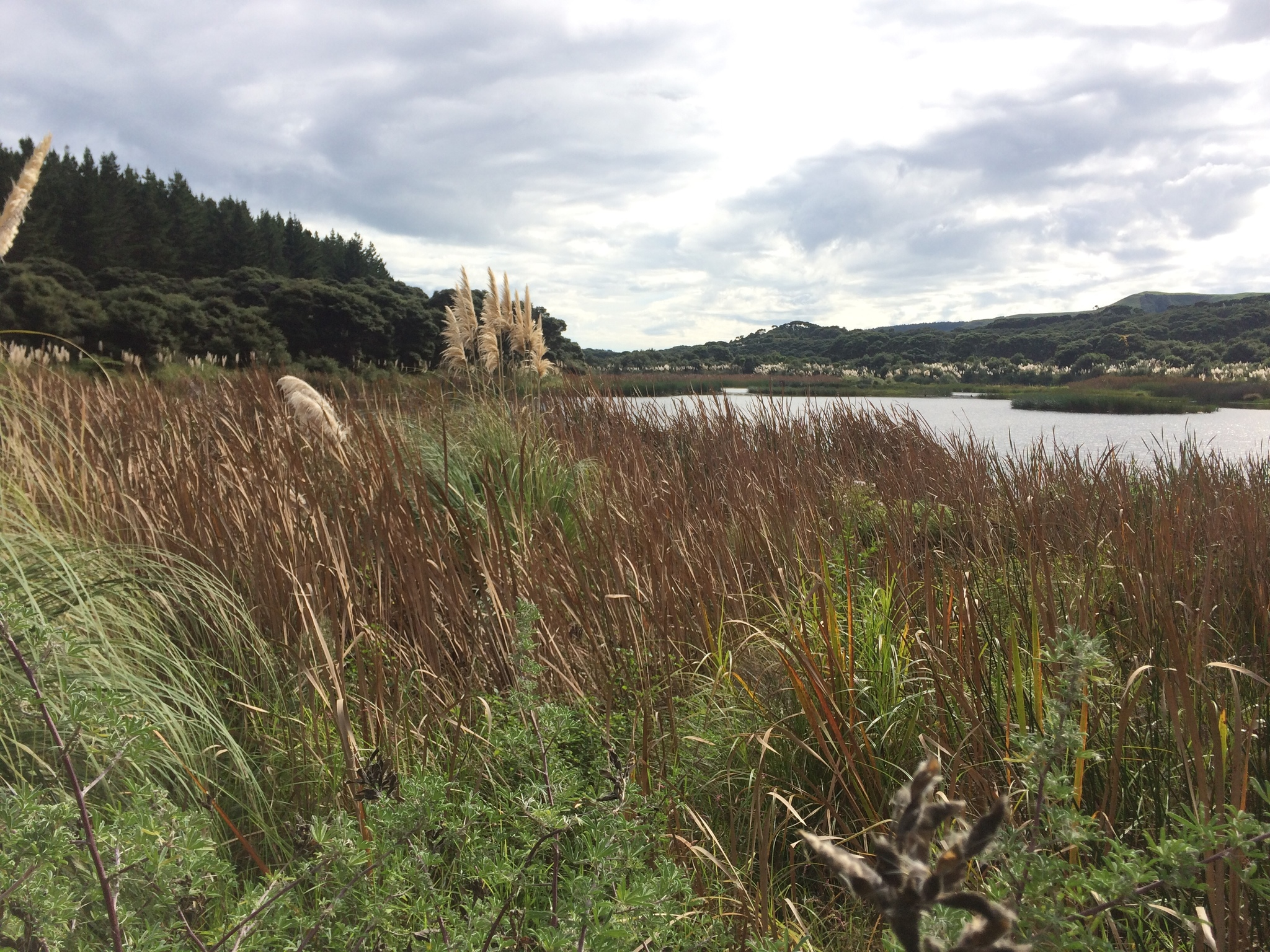
- Typha orientalis on the shores of Lake Kereta in the Woodhill Forest
- Interactive map of Woodhill Forest
- Coordinates: 36°45′S 174°24′E

Woodhill Forest (Māori: Te Ngahere o Woodhill) is a commercial exotic (pine) forest located to the northwest of Auckland, New Zealand. The forest covers approx. 12,500 ha (31,000 acres) of the South Kaipara Head, from Muriwai to the north of South Head. The forest is a popular location for a number of recreation activities, including horse riding, 4WD and trail biking, mountain biking, paintball, tree climbing adventures (confidence and team building), orienteering and filming; all require purchase of a permit, and walking or dog walking is no longer supported by the owners. Woodhill Forest is a sand-based pine forest, providing all-weather trails and recreation.

Woodhill Forest is also notorious as a site where several bodies have been found dumped or buried.

== History ==
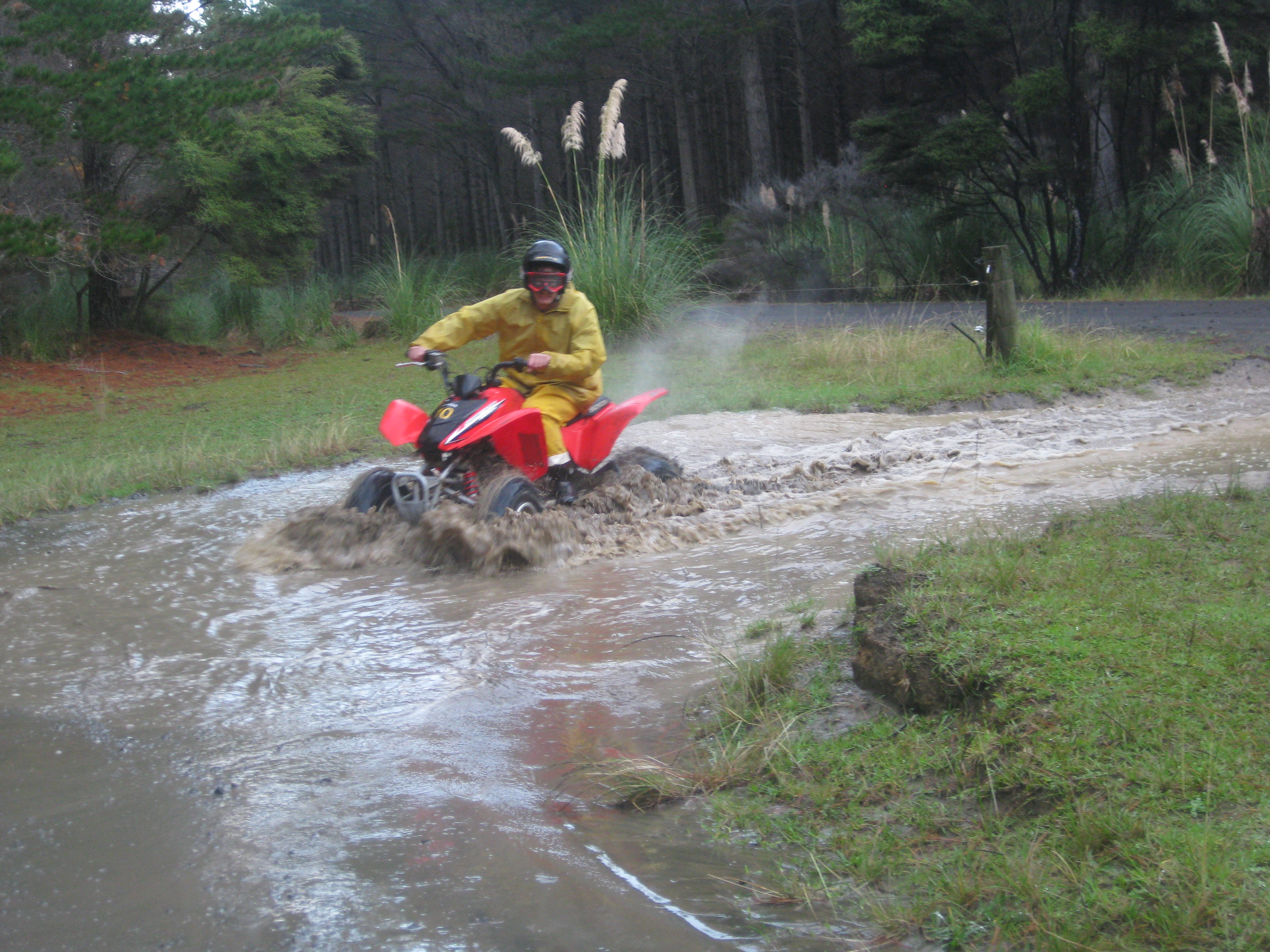
Woodhill Forest is used for many recreational activities, such as mountain biking and ATV riding (pictured)

Originally the coastal land was covered in native vegetation, but the arrival of British and their farm animals led to severe erosion. In the 1870s sheep and cattle grazing had already begun to cause problems in many coastal areas. By 1873 James Stewart reported fully grown trees buried by dunes and in the Kaipara dunes of 90 metres tall. Just a few years damage could transform an area from bush to desert.

The first NZ Forest Act of 1874 was largely in response to concern about the increase in coastal dune invasions. However, little was actually done. In 1880 the area of coastal drifting sands was 46,000 hectares, by 1909 it had grown to 120,000 hectares.

In 1903 the Sand Drift Act was introduced, but it wasn't until 1913 that the Public Works Dept made its first efforts in sand stabilisation. By 1924 only 65 hectares of marram had been planted at Woodhill. With the problem increasing each year, the great depression came to the rescue of the New Zealand coastline and lands. The Public Works Dept administered the unemployment relief fund, with 80,000 registered unemployed at their disposal they set them to work on sand stabilisation projects around the country.

In 1932 planting of marram grasses began in earnest, with lupins and eventually pine seedlings following. In Woodhill, there were 4 camps of 20-30 men per camp working all year round, with supplies being brought in from neighbouring farms and plants supplied from a nursery also in what was then a barren wasteland of sand dunes. The real pioneer was A.A.Restall, the highly successful Forest Manager at Woodhill, who introduced machinery and processes that lifted the amount of planting to levels that turned the tide of sand encroachment at Woodhill. Restall's created best practice for other sand reclamation projects around New Zealand, and around the world.

In the 1980s Woodhill Forest was one of many New Zealand Forest Service forests to be privatised as part of the Rogernomics asset sales program, and became a Licensed Crown Forest. Walking access by the public was still supported, however other activities were not except as permitted by the licensee. This began the commercialisation of recreation in the forest.

In 2014 the Treaty of Waitangi claim by Ngati Whatua o Kaipara was finally settled. The treaty settlement]has enabled Ngati Whatua o Kaipara the opportunity to purchase Woodhill Forest from the Crown. Ngati Whatua now manage recreational areas and other activities in Woodhill Forest. Hancock Forest Management retain a license for tree felling for the next 35 years under the Crown Forest Licence conditions (a gradual return to Ngati Whatua as felling occurs).

All recreation in the forest, whether organised events, or regular recreation is now commercial, and walking access is no longer supported by the owners.

== Climate ==
Climate data for Woodhill Forest (1981–2010 normals, extremes 1948–1993)
Month	Jan	Feb	Mar	Apr	May	Jun	Jul	Aug	Sep	Oct	Nov	Dec	Year
Record high °C (°F)	30.1 (86.2)	29.2 (84.6)	31.1 (88.0)	27.2 (81.0)	25.5 (77.9)	22.2 (72.0)	20.0 (68.0)	20.0 (68.0)	22.0 (71.6)	23.9 (75.0)	25.8 (78.4)	28.1 (82.6)	31.1 (88.0)
Mean daily maximum °C (°F)	22.8 (73.0)	23.4 (74.1)	22.4 (72.3)	20.2 (68.4)	17.9 (64.2)	15.8 (60.4)	15.0 (59.0)	15.4 (59.7)	16.6 (61.9)	17.8 (64.0)	19.2 (66.6)	21.6 (70.9)	19.0 (66.2)
Daily mean °C (°F)	18.7 (65.7)	19.1 (66.4)	17.7 (63.9)	15.5 (59.9)	13.7 (56.7)	11.4 (52.5)	10.5 (50.9)	11.2 (52.2)	12.6 (54.7)	13.8 (56.8)	15.3 (59.5)	17.3 (63.1)	14.7 (58.5)
Mean daily minimum °C (°F)	14.6 (58.3)	14.9 (58.8)	13.0 (55.4)	10.9 (51.6)	9.5 (49.1)	7.0 (44.6)	6.1 (43.0)	7.1 (44.8)	8.6 (47.5)	9.8 (49.6)	11.4 (52.5)	13.0 (55.4)	10.5 (50.9)
Record low °C (°F)	6.1 (43.0)	4.8 (40.6)	4.7 (40.5)	−0.8 (30.6)	−1.5 (29.3)	−4.2 (24.4)	−3.7 (25.3)	−2.5 (27.5)	−1.0 (30.2)	−0.6 (30.9)	2.0 (35.6)	2.5 (36.5)	−4.2 (24.4)
Average rainfall mm (inches)	89.9 (3.54)	58.0 (2.28)	111.6 (4.39)	90.3 (3.56)	97.7 (3.85)	110.2 (4.34)	125.2 (4.93)	138.8 (5.46)	110.4 (4.35)	88.8 (3.50)	99.2 (3.91)	83.8 (3.30)	1,203.9 (47.41)
Source: NIWA
