= Huapai =

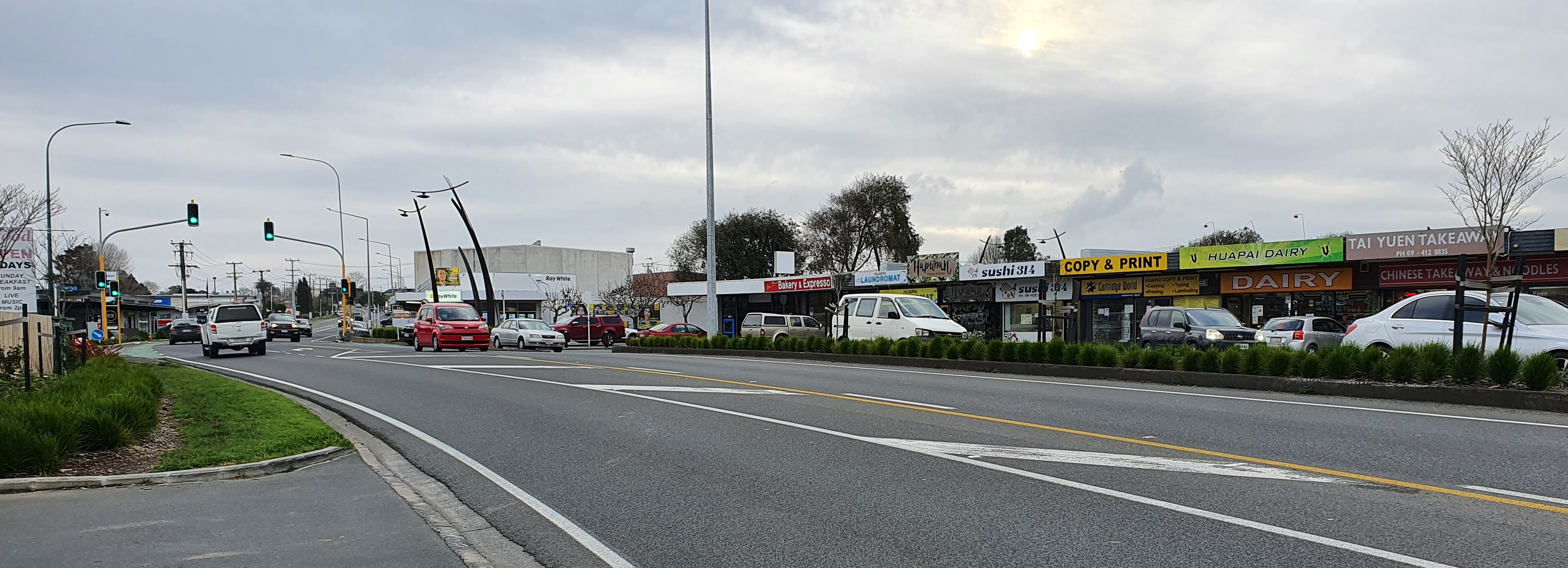
- The main road in Huapai
- Interactive map of Huapai
- Coordinates: 36°46′17″S 174°32′19″E
- Country: New Zealand
- Region: Auckland Region
- Ward: Rodney ward
- Local board: Rodney Local Board
- Subdivision: Kumeū subdivision
- Electorates: Kaipara ki Mahurangi; Te Tai Tokerau

Government
  - Territorial Authority: Auckland Council

Huapai is a locality north-west of Auckland, New Zealand. State Highway 16 and the North Auckland Railway Line pass through it. Kumeū is adjacent to the east, Riverhead is to the north-east, and Waimauku to the west.

The wider area has been settled by Tāmaki Māori since the 13th or 14th centuries, and the area is of significant importance to Ngāti Whātua o Kaipara and Te Kawerau ā Maki. The Kumeū River valley was an important transport node between the Kaipara and Waitematā harbours, due to a portage called Te Tōangaroa, where waka could be hauled overland.

Settlement at Huapai developed in the 1870s after the construction of the Kumeu–Riverhead Section, a railway that linked Kumeū to Riverhead. In 1914, Huapai was established as a rural housing estate, and promoted as a fruit growing area. By the 1940s, Croatian New Zealanders developed a winemaking industry at Kumeū and Huapai. Since the 1970s, Kumeū and Huapai have grown to become a single urban area, often referred to as Kumeū-Huapai.

== Etymology ==
The name Huapai was coined by property developers Lionel Hanlon and G.W. Green in the early 1910s, which they created from Māori language words to mean "Good Fruit". Prior to this, the area has a variety of names during early European settlement, including Kumeu North, Kumeu Flat, and Pukekorari. Hanlon and Green applied the name to an area of 5,000 acres (2,000 ha) north of Kumeū, which their company Northern Fruitlands Ltd. developed into apple and pear orchards. The traditional Māori name for Huapai is Tūrakiawatea, a name associated with Te Kawerau ā Maki ancestor Ruarangi, who likely travelled through the area in the 16th century.

== Geography ==
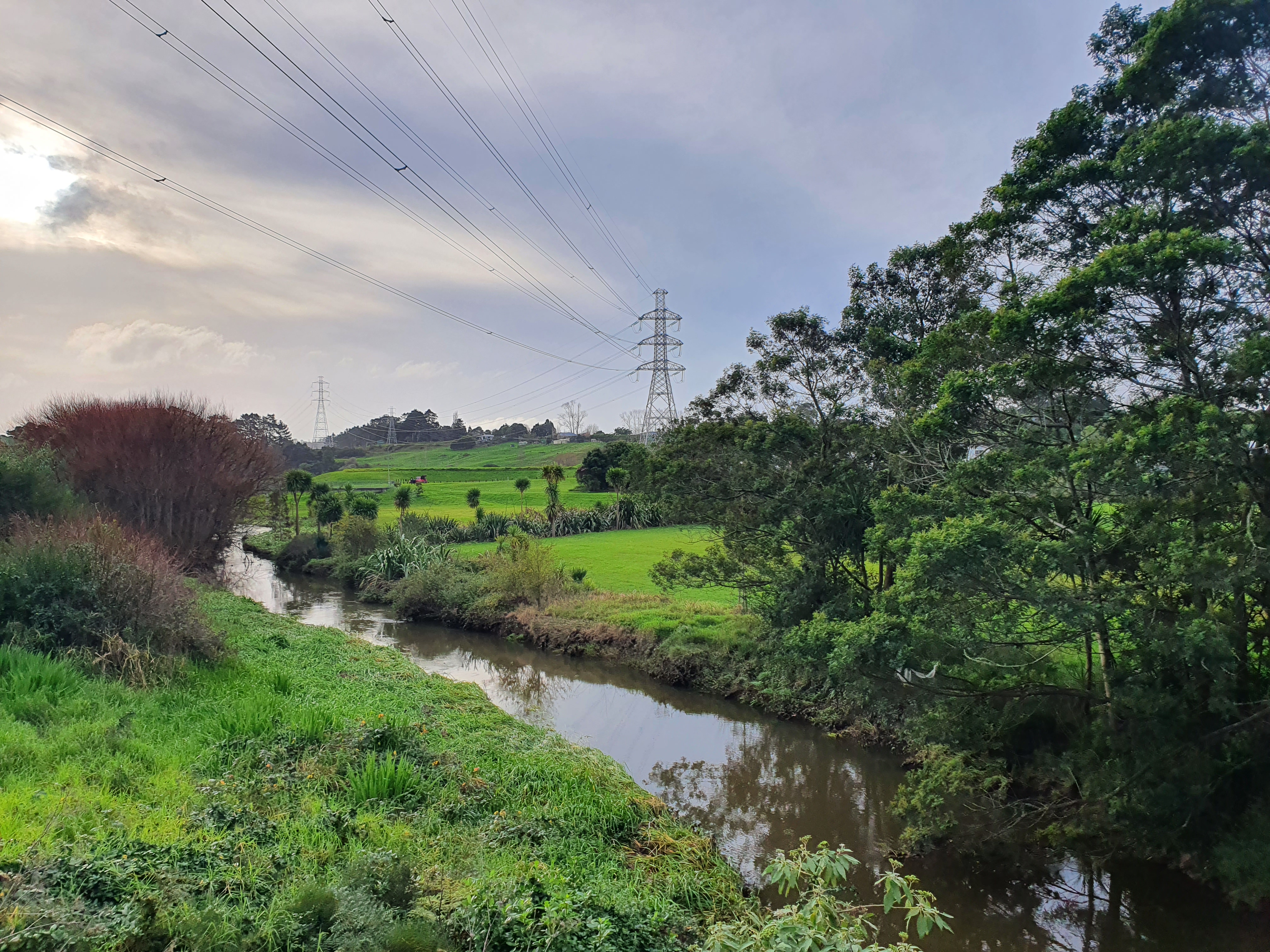
The town is located along the banks of the Kumeū River, a tributary of the Kaipara River

Huapai is a town north-west of Auckland, located along the Kumeū River, a major tributary of the Kaipara River. It is located to the west of Kumeū, and the two towns share a conurban metropolitan area, and is close to the towns of Riverhead (to the north-east) and Waimauku, to the west. Urban West Auckland suburbs are located 6 kilometres (3.7 mi) to the south-east of Kumeū, including Westgate and the NorthWest Shopping Centre.

The Kumeū River area has traditionally been a wetland and flood plain, prior to European settlement. The Kumeū valley regularly flooded during the 1920s and 1930s, and a major flood occurred in 1954.

== History ==
The Auckland Region has been settled by Māori since around the 13th or 14th centuries. The Kumeū River valley was sparsely populated, but was an important transportation node due to Te Tōangaroa, a portage where waka could be hauled between the Kaipara Harbour and the Waitematā Harbour, via the Kaipara and Kumeū rivers. By the early 18th century, Ngāti Whātua tribes had settled the southern Kaipara Harbour and Kumeū River valley areas. During the Musket Wars of the 1820s, Ngāti Whātua and Te Kawerau ā Maki vacated the area, returning in the late 1820s and 1830s. The Ngāti Whātua village was not resettled after the war. During modern times, the area is considered parts of the rohe of Ngāti Whātua o Kaipara and Te Kawerau ā Maki.

The first land blocks of the Kumeū River valley were purchased by the Crown from Ngāti Whātua in 1853. Ngāti Whātua sold land in the hope that this would lead to Europeans settlements developing and stimulate the economy of the area. The Kumeū River valley was difficult to navigate, until the railway between Kumeū and Riverhead was established in 1875. Kumeū land owner Thomas Deacon gifted land for the railway, which led to the construction of two railway stations: Kumeū in the south, and one near his hotel at modern Huapai, which was established in 1877.

The railway brought more settlers to the Kumeū-Huapai area. Initially the Kumeu Flat area was developed by Deacon into a village, with Kumeū remaining a rural for longer. The villages of Kumeū and Taupaki slowly grew during this period, and the first Kumeu Hall was constructed by 1876. The hall became a hub for the community, used as a school, church and for social events. In 1881, a continuous railway between Helensville and Auckland opened, causing significant growth in the Kumeū area. Sheep and dairy farmers were increasingly drawn to the Kumeū area from the 1880s, as land was gradually cleared of forest, kauri gum and flax.

=== Establishment of Huapai ===
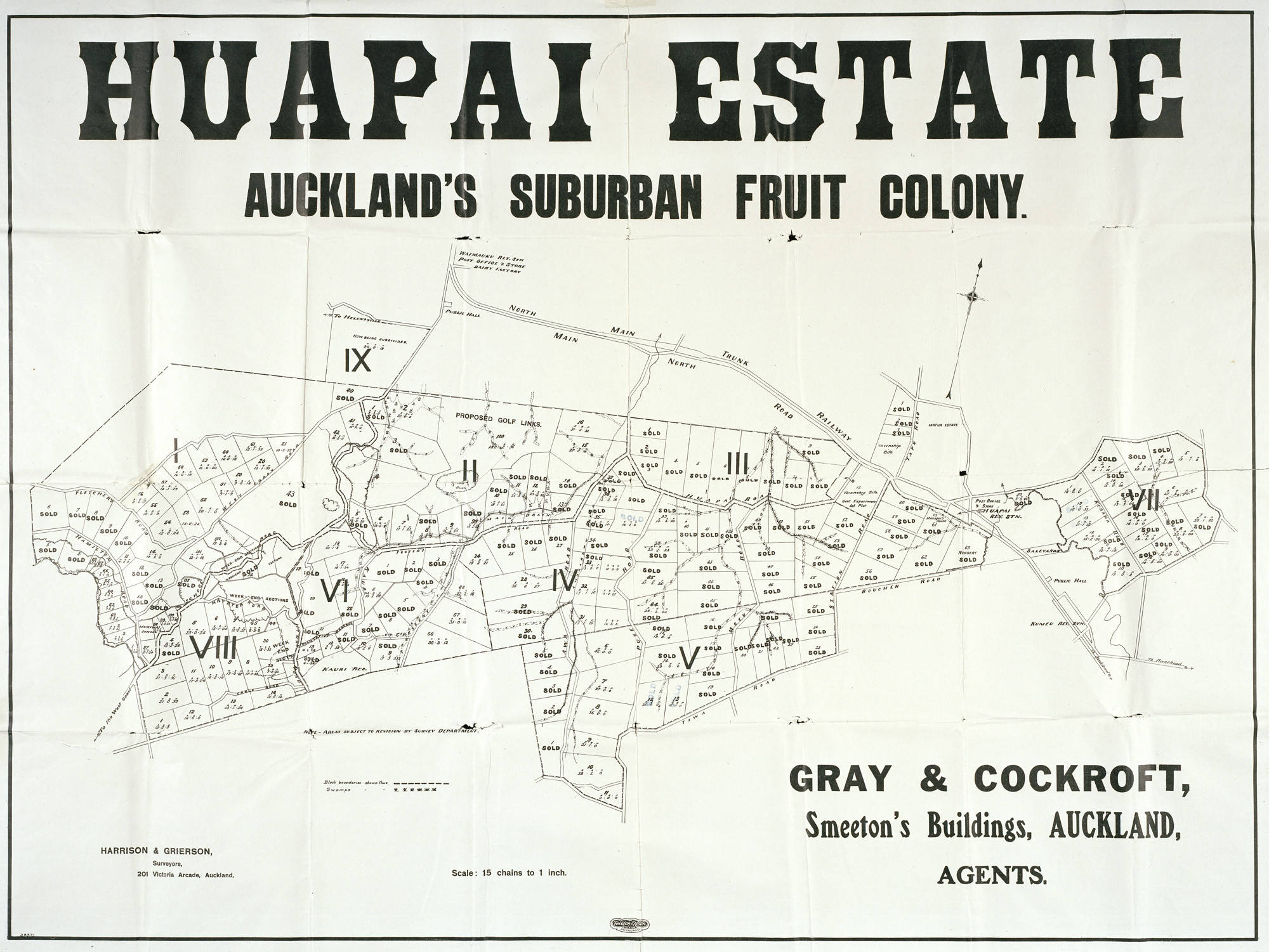
Cadastral map advertising the Huapai Estate as "Auckland's Suburban Fruit Colony", circa 1920

In the early 1910s, Lionel Hanlon and G.W. Green established a company called Northern Fruitlands Ltd., which subdivided 5,000 acres (2,000 ha) of land northwest of Kumeū into 10 acres (4.0 ha) plots, which they called the Huapai Estate. During this time, the Pukekorari train station was renamed to be the Huapai train station. The first sections were sold in 1914, and new institutions came to the area, with Huapai School established in 1919, and St Chad's Anglican Church in 1925. Gradually Yugoslav, Croatian and later Dutch communities joined the primarily British and Australia/New Zealand people of the Kumeū River valley settlements..

In Huapai in 1932, E. D. Forester established the first kiwifruit orchard in New Zealand to grow the Hayward variety of kiwifruit, which later became the standard green variety of kiwifruit.

By 1936, 303 people lived at Huapai, while 198 were living in Kumeū, and 113 in the surrounding rural area of Kumeū. Winemaking was established at an industry at Kumeū and Huapai in the early 1940s, led by Croatian families such as Nick and Zuva Nobilo, and Mick and Katé Brajkovich. Most notably for Huapai, the Nobilo family operated the Gilbey-Nobilo vineyard from Huapai, producing wine from Cabernet Sauvignon and Pinotage grapes.

By the 1970s, the fruit growing industry in Huapai became less profitable, after areas such as the Hawkes Bay became more efficient growers. During the same decade, industrial firms began opening operations in Huapai and Kumeū, during which the villages of Huapai and Kumeū began merging into a single urban area.

== Local government ==
From 1876 until 1974, the Huapai area was administered by the Waitemata County, a large rural county north and west of the city of Auckland. After this, Huapai became a part of Rodney County. In 1989, the county was abolished, and in its place the Rodney District was formed. Rodney District Council was amalgamated into Auckland Council in November 2010.

Within the Auckland Council, Huapai is a part of the Rodney local government area governed by the Rodney Local Board. It is a part of the Rodney ward, which elects one councillor to the Auckland Council.

== Huapai School ==
Huapai District School is a coeducational full primary school (years 1–8), with a decile rating of 9 and a roll of 436 in 2013. Huapai School currently hosts 22 classrooms and has a roll of 499 students as of July 2026. The school has one large and one medium-sized field, with association football and rugby goals respectively, and two playgrounds, with another soon-to-be built adventure playground worth over NZ$50,000. There is a sealed bike track covering the whole school, as well as a BMX track for students. The school also has a tennis / hockey court, swimming pool, flag court, dedicated music suite, professional audio system, and a soon-to-be built completely new administration block including a large library.

== Bibliography ==
- Diamond, John T.; Hayward, Bruce W. (1990). "Prehistoric Sites in West Auckland". In Northcote-Bade, James (ed.). West Auckland Remembers, Volume 1. West Auckland Historical Society. pp. 33–41. ISBN 0-473-00983-8.
- Dunsford, Deborah (2002). Doing It Themselves: the Story of Kumeu, Huapai and Taupaki. Huapai-Kumeu Lions Club. ISBN 0-473-08969-6.
- Taua, Te Warena (2009). "He Kohikohinga Kōrero mō Hikurangi". In Macdonald, Finlay; Kerr, Ruth (eds.). West: The History of Waitakere. Random House. pp. 23–48. ISBN 9781869790080.
