= Kumeū =

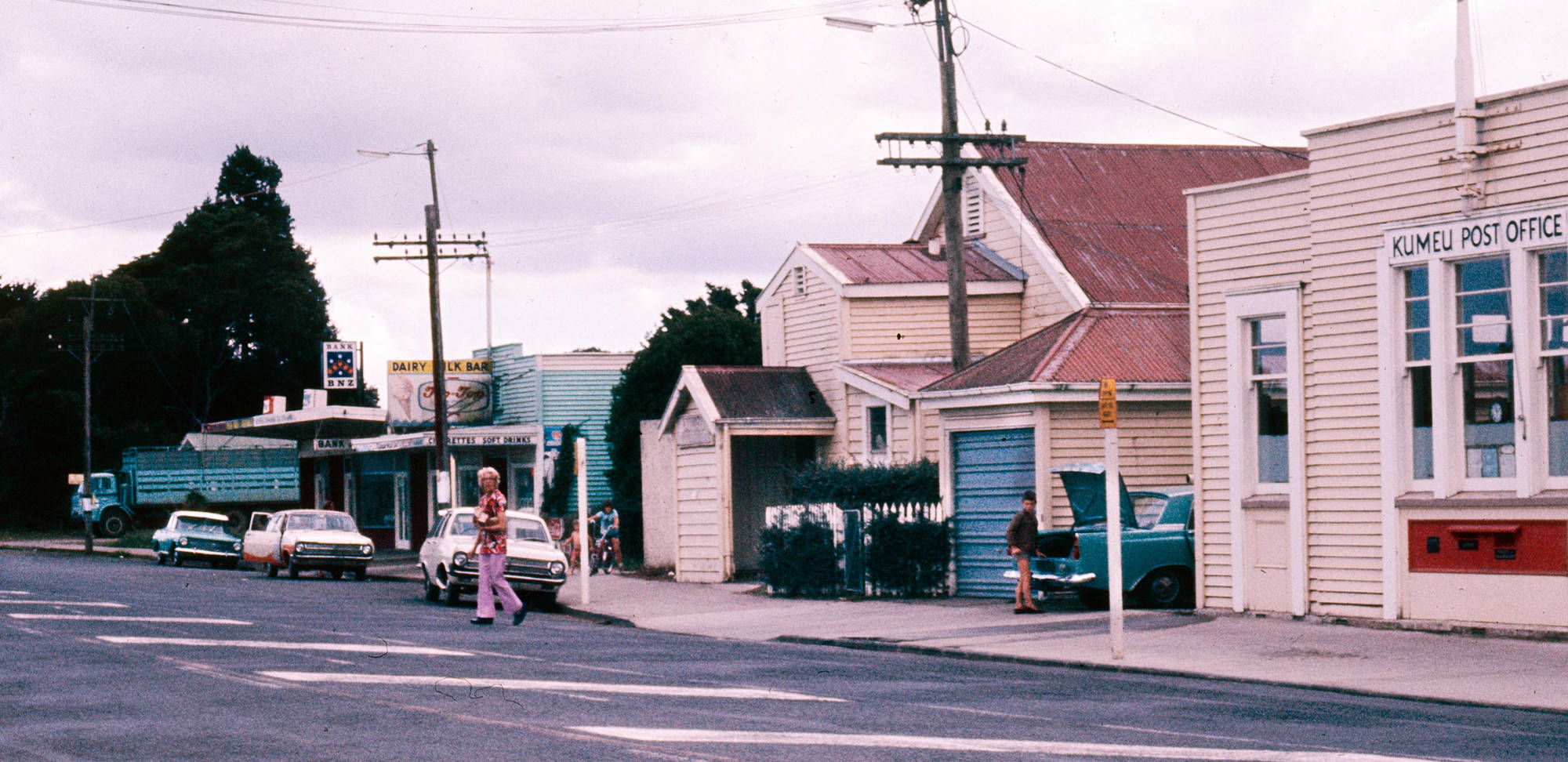
- The main road of Kumeū in 1973
- Interactive map of Kumeū
- Coordinates: 36°46′33″S 174°33′19″E
- Country: New Zealand
- Region: Auckland Region
- Ward: Rodney ward
- Local board: Rodney Local Board
- Subdivision: Kumeū subdivision
- Electorates: Kaipara ki Mahurangi; Te Tai Tokerau

Government
  - Territorial Authority: Auckland Council
  - Mayor of Auckland: Wayne Brown
  - Kaipara ki Mahurangi MP: Jessica Rowe
  - Te Tai Tokerau MP: TBD

Area
  - Total: 6.83 km^{2} (2.64 sq mi)

Population (June 2025)
  - Total: 8,270
  - Density: 1,210/km^{2} (3,140/sq mi)

Kumeū is a town in the Auckland Region, situated 25 kilometres (16 mi) north-west of the City Centre in New Zealand. State Highway 16 and the North Auckland Line pass through the town. Huapai lies to the west, Riverhead to the north, Whenuapai to the east, and Taupaki to the south.

The wider area has been settled by Tāmaki Māori since the 13th or 14th centuries, and the area is of significant importance to Ngāti Whātua o Kaipara and Te Kawerau ā Maki. The Kumeū River valley was an important transport node between the Kaipara and Waitematā harbours, due to a portage called Te Tōangaroa, where waka could be hauled overland.

Kumeū village developed in the 1870s after the construction of the Kumeu–Riverhead Section, a railway on Te Tōangaroa that linked Kumeū to Riverhead. Over the latter 19th century, the town transitioned from a centre for the kauri logging and kauri gum trades into an agricultural centre. The Kumeu Stockyards opened in 1915, and from 1921 the town began holding a large-scale agricultural show called the Kumeu Show. By the 1940s, Croatian New Zealanders had developed a winemaking industry in the area. Since the 1970s, Kumeū and Huapai have grown to become a single urban area, often referred to as Kumeū-Huapai.

== Etymology ==
The name Kumeū in Māori language originally referred to the north-east of Taupaki village, to the south of modern-day Kumeū. The name is associated with one of the earliest ancestors of the modern Te Kawerau ā Maki iwi, Te Kauea, who was of the early iwi Tini ō Toi (the people of Toi-te-huatahi). During the battle that preceded the peace accord, a wahine toa (woman warrior) pulled at her breast when calling her warriors to revenge an insult, giving rise to the name "Kume-ū" ("Pull Breast").

The first print references to the Kumeū River in English date from the 1850s, followed by references to the Kumeu Road District in 1861. References to Kumeu and Kumeu Flats as a settlement begin from 1867.

The traditional Māori name for Kumeū is Wai-paki-i-rape.

== Geography ==
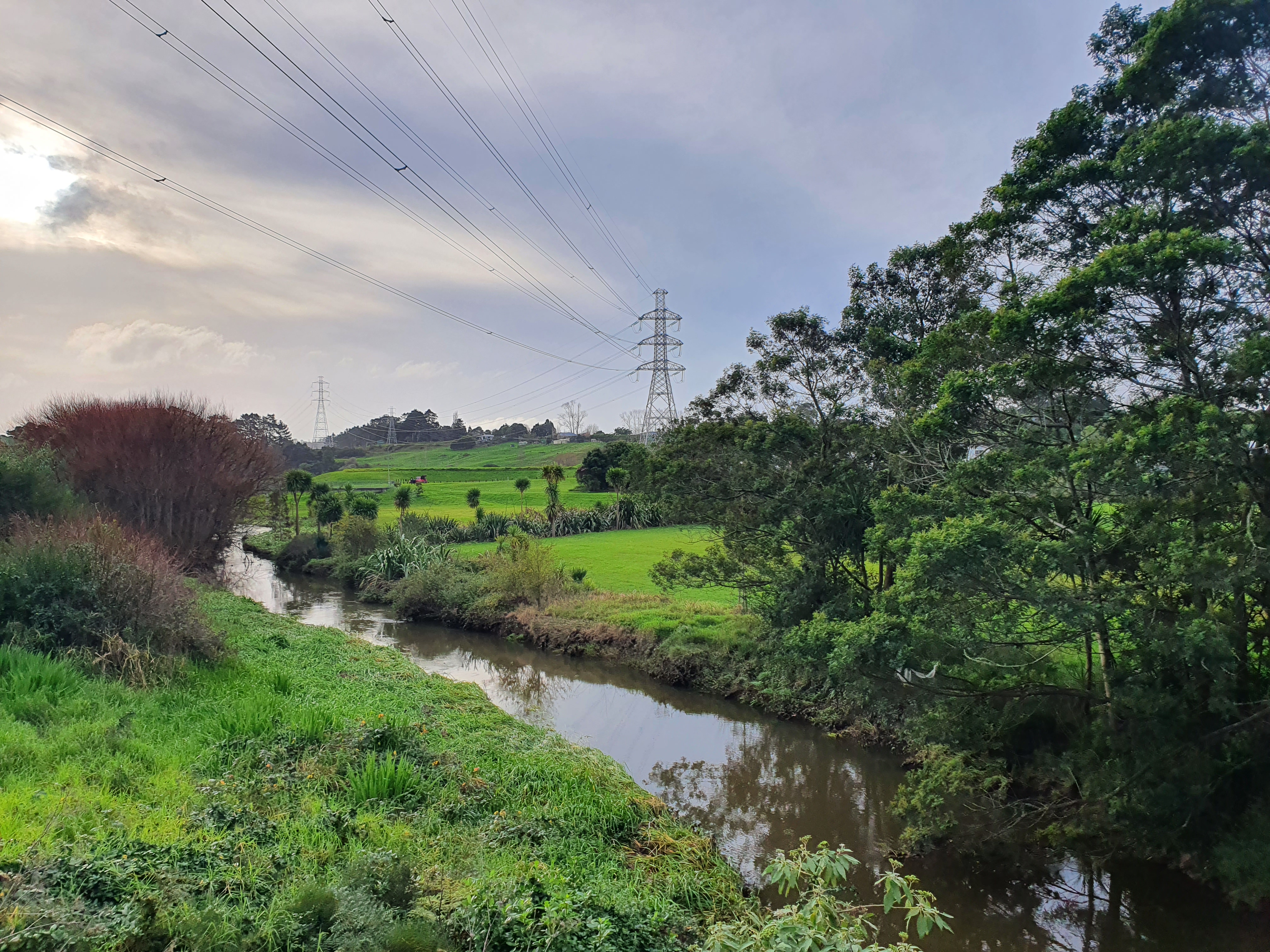
The town is located along the banks of the Kumeū River, a tributary of the Kaipara River

Kumeū is a town north-west of Auckland, located along the Kumeū River, a major tributary of the Kaipara River. It is located to the east of Huapai, and the two towns share a conurban metropolitan area, and is close to the towns of Riverhead (to the north-east) and Waimauku, to the west past Huapai. Urban West Auckland suburbs are located 6 kilometres (3.7 mi) to the south-east of Kumeū, including Westgate and the NorthWest Shopping Centre.

The Kumeū River area has traditionally been a wetland and flood plain, prior to European settlement. The Kumeū valley regularly flooded during the 1920s and 1930s, and a major flood occurred in 1954.

Kumeū has a substantial amount of lifestyle blocks.

=== Climate ===
Climate data for Kumeu (1971–2000 normals, extremes 1978–1989, 2006–2011)
Month	Jan	Feb	Mar	Apr	May	Jun	Jul	Aug	Sep	Oct	Nov	Dec	Year
Record high °C (°F)	29.0 (84.2)	31.3 (88.3)	27.2 (81.0)	26.4 (79.5)	24.0 (75.2)	20.5 (68.9)	19.5 (67.1)	20.0 (68.0)	22.0 (71.6)	23.7 (74.7)	26.4 (79.5)	28.5 (83.3)	31.3 (88.3)
Mean daily maximum °C (°F)	23.4 (74.1)	24.0 (75.2)	22.7 (72.9)	20.3 (68.5)	17.7 (63.9)	15.5 (59.9)	14.7 (58.5)	15.1 (59.2)	16.3 (61.3)	17.9 (64.2)	19.7 (67.5)	21.9 (71.4)	19.1 (66.4)
Daily mean °C (°F)	18.4 (65.1)	18.9 (66.0)	17.6 (63.7)	15.1 (59.2)	12.8 (55.0)	10.9 (51.6)	10.0 (50.0)	10.6 (51.1)	12.3 (54.1)	13.5 (56.3)	15.1 (59.2)	16.9 (62.4)	14.3 (57.8)
Mean daily minimum °C (°F)	13.3 (55.9)	13.8 (56.8)	12.8 (55.0)	9.9 (49.8)	7.8 (46.0)	6.2 (43.2)	5.3 (41.5)	6.1 (43.0)	8.2 (46.8)	9.0 (48.2)	10.5 (50.9)	11.9 (53.4)	9.6 (49.2)
Record low °C (°F)	4.4 (39.9)	4.4 (39.9)	3.3 (37.9)	−1.3 (29.7)	−2.3 (27.9)	−4.4 (24.1)	−5.2 (22.6)	−2.2 (28.0)	−1.5 (29.3)	−0.3 (31.5)	2.5 (36.5)	1.0 (33.8)	−5.2 (22.6)
Average rainfall mm (inches)	58.4 (2.30)	60.2 (2.37)	101.5 (4.00)	97.0 (3.82)	79.1 (3.11)	152.9 (6.02)	184.1 (7.25)	159.6 (6.28)	146.3 (5.76)	94.6 (3.72)	77.9 (3.07)	90.6 (3.57)	1,302.2 (51.27)
Source: Earth Sciences NZ (rainfall 1991–2020)

== History ==
=== Māori history ===
The Auckland Region has been settled by Māori since around the 13th or 14th centuries. Some of the first tribal identities that developed for Tāmaki Māori who settled in the wider area include Tini o Maruiwi, Ngā Oho, Ngā Iwi, and Tini ō Toi, the latter of whom descend from Toi-te-huatahi. Many place names in the Kumeū River valley reference Te Kauea, a member of Tini ō Toi. Tāmaki Māori legends describe supernatural beings as the inhabitants of the area known as the Tūrehu, who lived in areas such as the Waitākere Ranges.

While the Kumeū River valley was sparsely populated by Tāmaki Māori due to poor soil quality not suited to traditional crops, it was an important transportation node due to Te Tōangaroa, a portage where waka could be hauled between the Kaipara Harbour and the Waitematā Harbour, via the Kaipara and Kumeū rivers. Major settlements in the area were typically upland of the Kaipara and Kumeū rivers.

Around the 15th century, a group known as Ngāti Awa who descended from the Mātaatua waka settled Te Korowai-o-Te-Tonga Peninsula, led by Tītahi. The iwi were prominent constructors of terraced pā. By the mid-17th century, Ngāti Awa and Ngā Oho struggled to control territory. A descendant of Tītahi, Hauparoa, to ask his relative, a renowned warrior, to migrated from the Kāwhia Harbour to his ancestral home in the Auckland Region. Maki conquered and unified many of the Tāmaki Māori tribes, including those of West Auckland and the southern Kaipara, leading to the development of Te Kawerau ā Maki as a tribal identity.

In the 17th and early 18th centuries, Ngāti Whātua tribes began migrating south of the Kaipara Harbour. Initially relations between the iwi were friendly, and many important marriages were made. Hostilities broke out and Ngāti Whātua asked for assistance from Kāwharu, a famed Tainui warrior from Kawhia. Kāwharu's repeated attacks of the Waitākere Ranges settlements became known as Te Raupatu Tīhore, or the stripping conquest. Lasting peace between Te Kawerau ā Maki and Ngāti Whātua was forged by Maki's grandson Te Au o Te Whenua, who fixed the rohe (border) between Muriwai Beach and Rangitōpuni (Riverhead). Ngāti Whātua divided the land among different hapū, including Te Taoū, who were the major power in the Kaipara River catchment.

Around the year 1740, war broke out between Ngāti Whātua and Waiohua, the confederation of Tāmaki Māori tribes centred to the southeast, on the Tāmaki isthmus. Kiwi Tāmaki, paramount chief of Waiohua, led a surprise attack in the south Kaipara during an uhunga (funeral rite commemoration), in response for past grievances and to assist a Ngāti Whātua faction who were opposed to Te Taoū. By 1741, Ngāti Whātua had successfully fought against Kiwi Tāmaki, both sides often using the portage at Kumeū. Following the end of the conflict, members of Te Taoū established themselves on the Auckland isthmus, and a Ngāti Whātua kāinga was settled in the Kumeū area, until the 1820s.

During the Musket Wars of the 1820s, Ngāti Whātua and Te Kawerau ā Maki vacated the area, returning in the late 1820s and 1830s. The Ngāti Whātua village was not resettled after the war. During modern times, the area is considered parts of the rohe of Ngāti Whātua o Kaipara and Te Kawerau ā Maki.

=== Early colonial era ===
After the Treaty of Waitangi was signed in 1840, Ngāti Whātua operated coastal trading vessels, supplying goods to early European settlers at Auckland. The first land blocks of the Kumeū River valley were purchased by the Crown from Ngāti Whātua in 1853, with remaining blocks sold between 1868 and 1890. Ngāti Whātua sold land in the hope that this would lead to Europeans settlements developing and stimulate the economy of the area. Often land sales had negligible profits for Ngāti Whātua, due to the cost of the Native Land Court bureaucracy, surveying costs, advertising and auction costs, ad often land was sold to speculators who did not intend to settle in the area. The Kumeū River valley was difficult to navigate, and a narrow dray road was constructed primarily by Ngāti Whātua in the 1850s.

After the establishment of the Albertland settlements at Port Albert and Wellsford in the early 1860s, the Kaipara River and Kumeū River valley saw increased traffic. Road conditions along the Kumeū River valley were so poor and the Kaipara Harbour mouth too treacherous for most ships, that the Albertland settlers petitioned the government for better transportation links, fearing that they would starve. The Kaipara Harbour was not a priority for the government, who instead focused on developing logistically important locations south of Auckland during the Invasion of the Waikato, but by 1865 the government had agreed to fund road improvements. Ngāti Whātua, hoping for better infrastructure in the area, sold a narrow strip of land between the Awaroa Creek and Riverhead in 1866.

The first references to European settlement begins in 1867, with the mention of a court case involving a store at Kumeu Flats, owned by Mr. Vidal of Auckland and illegally operated by James Ensor. By the 1870s, the first families had settled in the Kumeū River valley.

=== The Kumeu–Riverhead railway ===
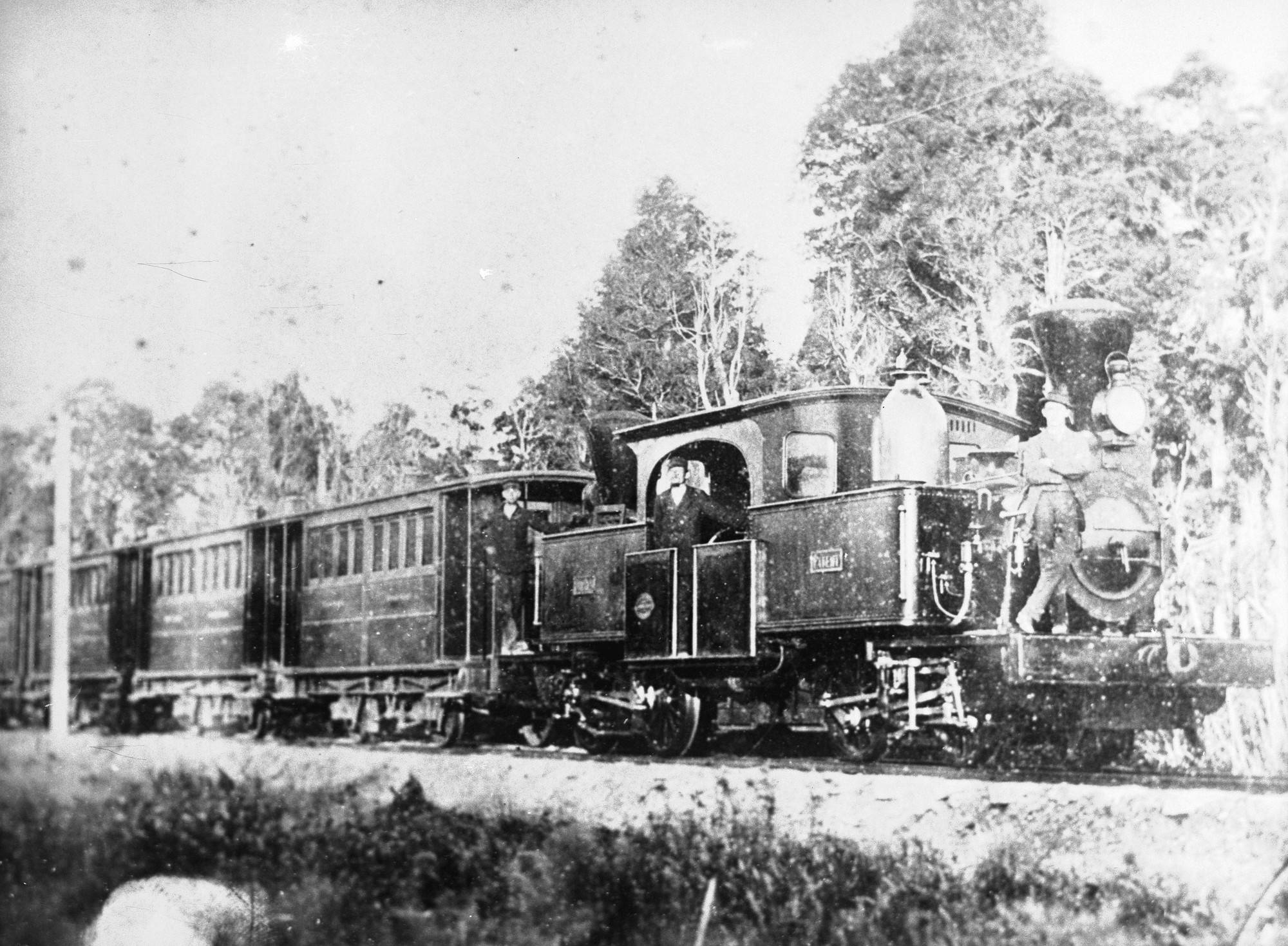
An NZR E class (1872) train on the Kumeu–Riverhead railway in 1876

Ngāti Whātua of the southern Kaipara struggled financially during the 1870s, as the increase in settlers and trade had not eventuated, leading Ngāti Whātua to sell further land blocks. By 1877, most of the Kumeū River valley had been sold, with Ngāti Whātua communities remaining at Reweti, Woodhill and the Kaipara Harbour coast, no longer having a presence in the Upper Waitematā Harbour.

In 1875 after four years of construction, a railway between Kumeū and Riverhead was opened. Kumeū land owner Thomas Deacon gifted land for the railway, which led to the construction of two railway stations: Kumeū in the south, and one near his hotel at modern Huapai (then variously called Pukekorari, Kumeu Flat, or Kumeu North), which was established in 1877. The railway brought more settlers to the Kumeū-Huapai area. Initially the Kumeu Flat area was developed by Deacon into a village, with Kumeū remaining a rural for longer. The villages of Kumeū and Taupaki slowly grew during this period, and the first Kumeu Hall was constructed by 1876. The hall became a hub for the community, used as a school, church and for social events.

Shortly after the Kumeu–Riverhead Section opened, Auckland area residents pressured the government for a continuous rail link between Auckland and Helensville, to bypass the need to cross the Waitematā Harbour and Kaipara River by boat. Construction on the extended North Auckland Line from New Lynn north began in 1879, employing many men who lived at Kumeū and Taupaki, who helped to construct a tunnel for the railway line. The service opened in 1881, in the same year that the Kumeu–Riverhead Section was shuttered. This caused significant growth in the Kumeū area, and the surrounding communities gradually gravitated towards the railway stations along the North Auckland Line.

From 1884, kauri loggers were drawn to the Kumeū area, after the opening of the railway made logging financially possible in the area. Kauri gum diggers were also drawn to the area between 1880 and 1900, and local resident Tom Deacon ran a combined kauri gum camp and general store at Kumeū.

=== Rise of agriculture and World War II ===
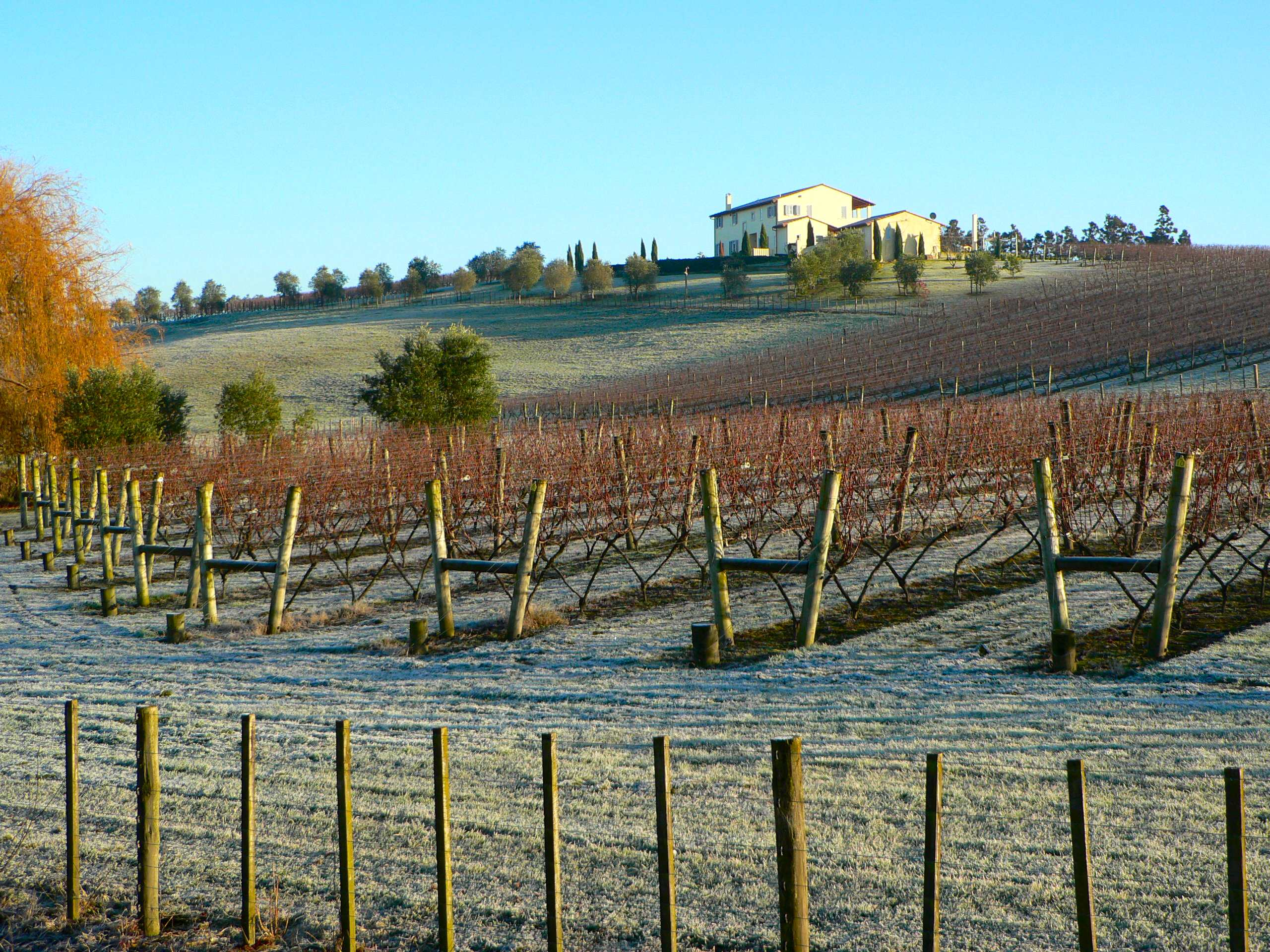
Kumeū is known for its agricultural produce, including wines.

Farmers were increasingly drawn to the Kumeū area from the 1880s, as land was gradually cleared of forest, kauri gum and flax. Initially most farmers ran sheep farms, but by the 1890s dairy farming had become more viable. By the turn of the 20th century, settlers to the area primarily arrived from Britain, Australia, and other parts of New Zealand, joined by Yugoslav, Croatian and later Dutch communities during the early to mid-20th century.

The Kumeū River valley was promoted as a fruit growing area during the 1910s, and approximately 5,000 acres (2,000 ha) north of Kumeū were developed into apple and pear orchards by Northern Fruitlands Ltd as the Huapai estate. A new Kumeu hall opened in 1913, becoming the centre for the wider district for the next 60 years. The Kumeū Catholic Church was established in 1915, on land donated by Dalmatian immigrant Martin Lovich, becoming the focus for both Catholic and Croatian communities in the wider area.

In 1915, Alfred Buckland established the Kumeu Stockyards adjacent to the railway, and fortnightly livestock auctions became a major fixture of Kumeū for much of the 20th century. From 1921, the Kumeu Show became a major annual event for the community.

By 1936, 311 people were living in Kumeū and the surrounding areas, with 303 people at Huapai. Winemaking was established at an industry at Kumeū in the early 1940s, led by Croatian families such as Nick and Zuva Nobilo, and Mick and Katé Brajkovich.

During World War II, the RNZAF Base Auckland was established to the east at Whenuapai, becoming the main hub of operations for the New Zealand Defence Force. Wary of the threat of Japanese airstrikes, a decoy airforce base was established at Kumeū, and wooden Hudson bombers were constructed. While primarily a decoy, the airstrip was used by pilots training to use Tiger Moths. During the war, the Kumeū Hall became a popular socialisation spot for servicement based at Whenuapai, and for United States marines based at Muriwai.

=== Industrial centre and winemaking ===
A commercial centre developed at Kumeū in 1957, after the establishment of Wally Reber's transport business. The winemaking industry underwent a boom in the 1960s and 1970s, including vineyards such as San Marino (now known as Kumeū River Valley), Gilbey Nobilo. Corbans bought vineyeards in the area, and in 1960 Selaks relocated to Kumeū after their Te Atatū vineyard was requisitioned to construct the Northwestern Motorway.

In the 1970s, industrial firms began opening operations in Huapai and Kumeū, including a Carters timber yard, and the New Zealand Particle Board factory, both opening in 1972. During this period, the villages began to merge into a single urban area.

In 2019, the name of the town was officially gazetted as Kumeū, although it is common to see it spelt without the macron.

== Demographics ==
Statistics New Zealand describes Kumeū-Huapai as a small urban area, which covers 6.83 km^{2} (2.64 sq mi) and had an estimated population of 8,270 as of June 2025, with a population density of 1,211 people per km^{2}.

Historical population for Kumeū-Huapai
Year	Pop.	±% p.a.
2006	1,386	—
2013	1,455	+0.70%
2018	3,480	+19.05%
2023	6,948	+14.83%
The 2006 population is for a smaller area of 6.31 km^{2}. Source:

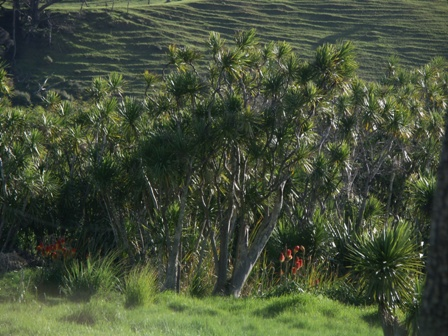
Cabbage trees in the area.

Kumeū-Huapai had a population of 6,948 in the 2023 New Zealand census, an increase of 3,468 people (99.7%) since the 2018 census, and an increase of 5,493 people (377.5%) since the 2013 census. There were 3,417 males, 3,513 females and 21 people of other genders in 2,280 dwellings. 2.7% of people identified as LGBTIQ+. The median age was 34.9 years (compared with 38.1 years nationally). There were 1,758 people (25.3%) aged under 15 years, 921 (13.3%) aged 15 to 29, 3,534 (50.9%) aged 30 to 64, and 735 (10.6%) aged 65 or older.

People could identify as more than one ethnicity. The results were 70.2% European (Pākehā); 9.4% Māori; 5.4% Pasifika; 24.6% Asian; 2.6% Middle Eastern, Latin American and African New Zealanders (MELAA); and 4.0% other, which includes people giving their ethnicity as "New Zealander". English was spoken by 93.8%, Māori language by 1.0%, Samoan by 0.6%, and other languages by 21.7%. No language could be spoken by 4.0% (e.g. too young to talk). New Zealand Sign Language was known by 0.3%. The percentage of people born overseas was 34.2, compared with 28.8% nationally.

Religious affiliations were 26.7% Christian, 6.8% Hindu, 1.1% Islam, 0.3% Māori religious beliefs, 0.9% Buddhist, 0.3% New Age, 0.2% Jewish, and 2.5% other religions. People who answered that they had no religion were 55.1%, and 6.1% of people did not answer the census question.

Of those at least 15 years old, 1,275 (24.6%) people had a bachelor's or higher degree, 2,565 (49.4%) had a post-high school certificate or diploma, and 951 (18.3%) people exclusively held high school qualifications. The median income was $61,000, compared with $41,500 nationally. 1,215 people (23.4%) earned over $100,000 compared to 12.1% nationally. The employment status of those at least 15 was that 3,279 (63.2%) people were employed full-time, 615 (11.8%) were part-time, and 87 (1.7%) were unemployed.

Individual statistical areas
Name	Area (km^{2})	Population	Density (per km^{2})	Dwellings	Median age	Median income
Kumeū-Huapai North	4.27	4,770	1,117	1,521	35.3 years	$60,600
Kumeū-Huapai South	2.56	2,175	850	762	34.2 years	$62,000
New Zealand					38.1 years	$41,500

=== Rural surrounds ===
The rural area around Kumeū and Huapai covers 40.72 km^{2} (15.72 sq mi) and had an estimated population of 3,850 as of June 2025, with a population density of 95 people per km^{2}.

Historical population for Kumeū rural areas
Year	Pop.	±% p.a.
2006	3,054	—
2013	3,348	+1.32%
2018	3,684	+1.93%
2023	3,765	+0.44%
The 2006 population is for a larger area of 49.35 km^{2}. Source:

Kumeū rural areas had a population of 3,765 in the 2023 New Zealand census, an increase of 81 people (2.2%) since the 2018 census, and an increase of 417 people (12.5%) since the 2013 census. There were 1,938 males, 1,809 females and 12 people of other genders in 1,218 dwellings. 2.5% of people identified as LGBTIQ+. There were 540 people (14.3%) aged under 15 years, 702 (18.6%) aged 15 to 29, 1,812 (48.1%) aged 30 to 64, and 705 (18.7%) aged 65 or older.

People could identify as more than one ethnicity. The results were 81.0% European (Pākehā); 12.8% Māori; 5.7% Pasifika; 13.0% Asian; 1.4% Middle Eastern, Latin American and African New Zealanders (MELAA); and 2.7% other, which includes people giving their ethnicity as "New Zealander". English was spoken by 95.2%, Māori language by 2.0%, Samoan by 0.7%, and other languages by 14.8%. No language could be spoken by 1.6% (e.g. too young to talk). New Zealand Sign Language was known by 0.3%. The percentage of people born overseas was 25.3, compared with 28.8% nationally.

Religious affiliations were 27.3% Christian, 2.5% Hindu, 0.7% Islam, 0.3% Māori religious beliefs, 0.4% Buddhist, 0.2% New Age, 0.6% Jewish, and 2.2% other religions. People who answered that they had no religion were 58.1%, and 8.0% of people did not answer the census question.

Of those at least 15 years old, 519 (16.1%) people had a bachelor's or higher degree, 1,758 (54.5%) had a post-high school certificate or diploma, and 801 (24.8%) people exclusively held high school qualifications. 483 people (15.0%) earned over $100,000 compared to 12.1% nationally. The employment status of those at least 15 was that 1,689 (52.4%) people were employed full-time, 453 (14.0%) were part-time, and 78 (2.4%) were unemployed.

Individual statistical areas
Name	Area (km^{2})	Population	Density (per km^{2})	Dwellings	Median age	Median income
Kumeū Rural West	24.36	1,650	68	576	43.6 years	$44,700
Kumeū Rural East	16.36	2,115	129	642	43.6 years	$44,900
New Zealand					38.1 years	$41,500

== Economy ==
Areas surrounding the Kumeū district produce labels such as Kumeu River, Cooper's Creek and Soljans Estate Winery have gained a good reputation for their Chardonnay and Sauvignon blanc wines. The winegrowing district is the main industry in both Kumeū itself and the smaller nearby settlements of Huapai and Waimauku.

- Kumeu River Wines, established in 1944.
- Coopers Creek, established in 1980.
- Landmark Estate, founded in 1937.
- Matua Valley, established in 1966. Matua Valley closed its doors in 2016.
- Nobilos was established in 1943 by Nikola Nobilo and remained family owned until the late 1990s. Now known as Nobilo Wine Group, the company is New Zealand's second largest wine company.
- Soljans Estate Winery was established in 1932 in Henderson, West Auckland. As the company grew they later moved to Kumeū in 2002

The township is in the North West Country Inc business improvement district zone. The business association which represents businesses from Kaukapakapa to Riverhead.

== Activities ==
The area is popular for lifestyle block farming and equestrian pursuits. The Kumeu Agricultural and Horticultural Society hosts one of the largest annual shows in the Southern Hemisphere on 34 hectares (84 acres) of land owned by the Kumeu District Agricultural and Horticultural Society, on the second weekend in March every year. The nearby localities of Woodhill forest and Muriwai Beach means it has strong recreational interests.

== Music ==
Since 1948 Kumeū has had a brass band, competing in many events, and playing in parades, concerts & private Functions, traditional & modern music for all occasions.

The Kumeu Showgrounds are also the venue for the annual Auckland Folk Festival, a 4-day event of music, dancing and workshops, now in its 46th year. The festival is generally held over the last weekend in January.

== Transport ==
The railway network's North Auckland Line passes through Kumeū. For six years the town was the terminus of the isolated Kumeu-Riverhead Section railway, which linked Kumeū to Riverhead, where ferries ran to Auckland. It operated from 1875 until 1881. In 1881, the North Auckland Line reached Kumeū, making the town a railway junction. This status lasted a mere five days; the new railway from Auckland made the line to Riverhead redundant and it was accordingly closed.

In June 2007 it was announced that suburban rail services would be extended to Helensville in 2008, with temporary stations to be built at Huapai and Waimauku. The service commenced on 14 July 2008 for a one-year trial period, and was then suspended permanently in 2009.

== Education ==
Kumeū is served by Huapai District School and Matua Ngaru School, which are coeducational full primary schools serving years 1–8 with rolls of 499 and 552 students respectively as at July 2026,. Huapai District School opened in 1919. Matua Ngaru opened in 2019.

The state integrated Hare Krishna School is a coeducational composite school serving years 1–10 with a roll of 214 students as at July 2026.

The majority of high-school-aged students attend schools in surrounding suburbs. The closest secondary schools are Kaipara College, Massey High School, Liston College, Albany Junior High School and St Dominic's College.

Kumeu Library is based at Huapai. Since the amalgamation of Auckland Council in 2010, Kumeu Library became a branch of Auckland Libraries. In July 2021, Huapai Service Centre was absorbed into the Library to form the Kumeū Library and council services.

== Local government ==
From 1876 until 1974, Kumeū was administered by the Waitemata County, a large rural county north and west of the city of Auckland. After this, Kumeū became a part of Rodney County. In 1989, the county was abolished, and in its place the Rodney District was formed. Rodney District Council was amalgamated into Auckland Council in November 2010.

Within the Auckland Council, Kumeū is a part of the Rodney local government area governed by the Rodney Local Board. It is a part of the Rodney ward, which elects one councillor to the Auckland Council.

== Bibliography ==
- Diamond, John T.; Hayward, Bruce W. (1979). The Māori history and legends of the Waitākere Ranges. The Lodestar Press. ISBN 9781877431210.
- Diamond, John T.; Hayward, Bruce W. (1990). "Prehistoric Sites in West Auckland". In Northcote-Bade, James (ed.). West Auckland Remembers, Volume 1. West Auckland Historical Society. pp. 33–41. ISBN 0-473-00983-8.
- Dunsford, Deborah (2002). Doing It Themselves: the Story of Kumeu, Huapai and Taupaki. Huapai-Kumeu Lions Club. ISBN 0-473-08969-6.
- Paterson, Malcolm (2009). "Ko Ngā Kurī Purepure o Tāmaki, e Kore e Ngari i te Pō". In Macdonald, Finlay; Kerr, Ruth (eds.). West: The History of Waitakere. Random House. pp. 49–62. ISBN 9781869790080.
- Taua, Te Warena (2009). "He Kohikohinga Kōrero mō Hikurangi". In Macdonald, Finlay; Kerr, Ruth (eds.). West: The History of Waitakere. Random House. pp. 23–48. ISBN 9781869790080.
