= Riverhead, New Zealand =

Riverhead
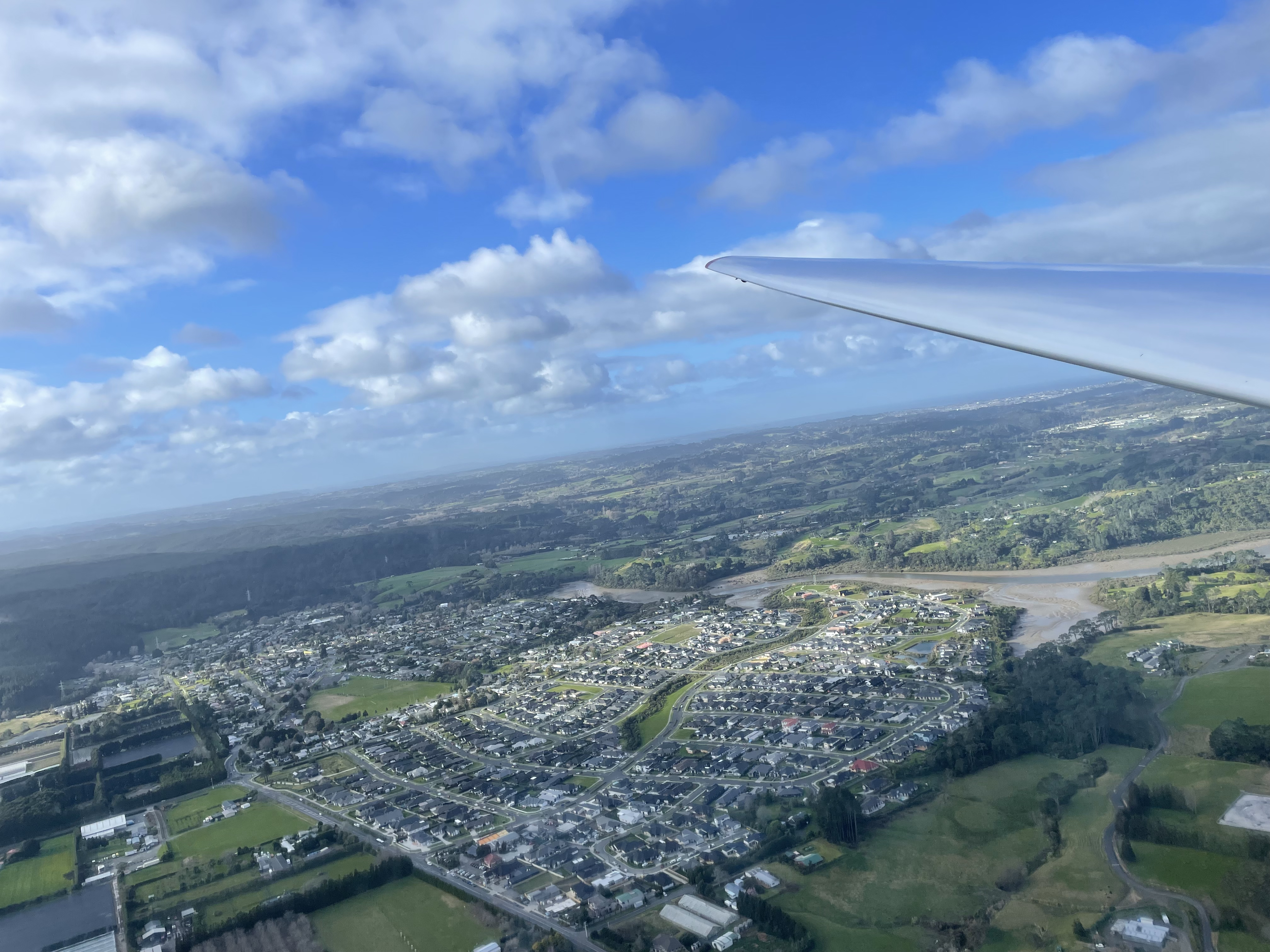
- Riverhead seen from a glider at 1201 feet
- Interactive map of Riverhead
- Coordinates: 36.758°S 174.592°E
- Country: New Zealand
- Region: Auckland Region
- Ward: Rodney ward
- Local board: Rodney Local Board
- Subdivision: Kumeū subdivision
- Electorates: Kaipara ki Mahurangi; Te Tai Tokerau

Government
  - Territorial Authority: Auckland Council
  - Mayor of Auckland: Wayne Brown
  - Kaipara ki Mahurangi MP: Chris Penk
  - Te Tai Tokerau MP: Mariameno Kapa-Kingi

Area
  - Total: 2.16 km^{2} (0.83 sq mi)

Population (June 2025)
  - Total: 3,840
  - Density: 1,780/km^{2} (4,600/sq mi)
- Postcode: 0820

Riverhead is a small, historically predominantly working-class town located at the head of the Waitematā Harbour in the north-west of Auckland, New Zealand. It is located on the northwestern shores of the Upper Waitematā Harbour, north-east of the towns of Kumeū and Huapai.

Traditionally known as Rangitōpuni, the area was an important transportation link for Tāmaki Māori, due to Te Tōangaroa, a portage where waka could be hauled between the Kaipara Harbour and the Waitematā Harbour. European settlement began in 1844 when a kauri mill was established at Riverhead, and the settlement became an important port for reaching the Kaipara Harbour from the 1850s. Riverhead developed as a community in the 1860s around the mill, which had been converted into the largest flour mill in the wider Auckland area. In 1874, a railway between Kumeū and Riverhead along the route of the Te Tōangaroa portage, which helped develop Riverhead and the Kumeū River valley areas, and closed in 1881 when a direct railway between Helensville and Auckland bypassed Riverhead.

Riverhead became an important centre for the kauri gum trade from the 1880s until the early 20th century, and in 1927, an exotic Pinus radiata forest called the Riverhead Forest was established to the north of the town.

== History ==
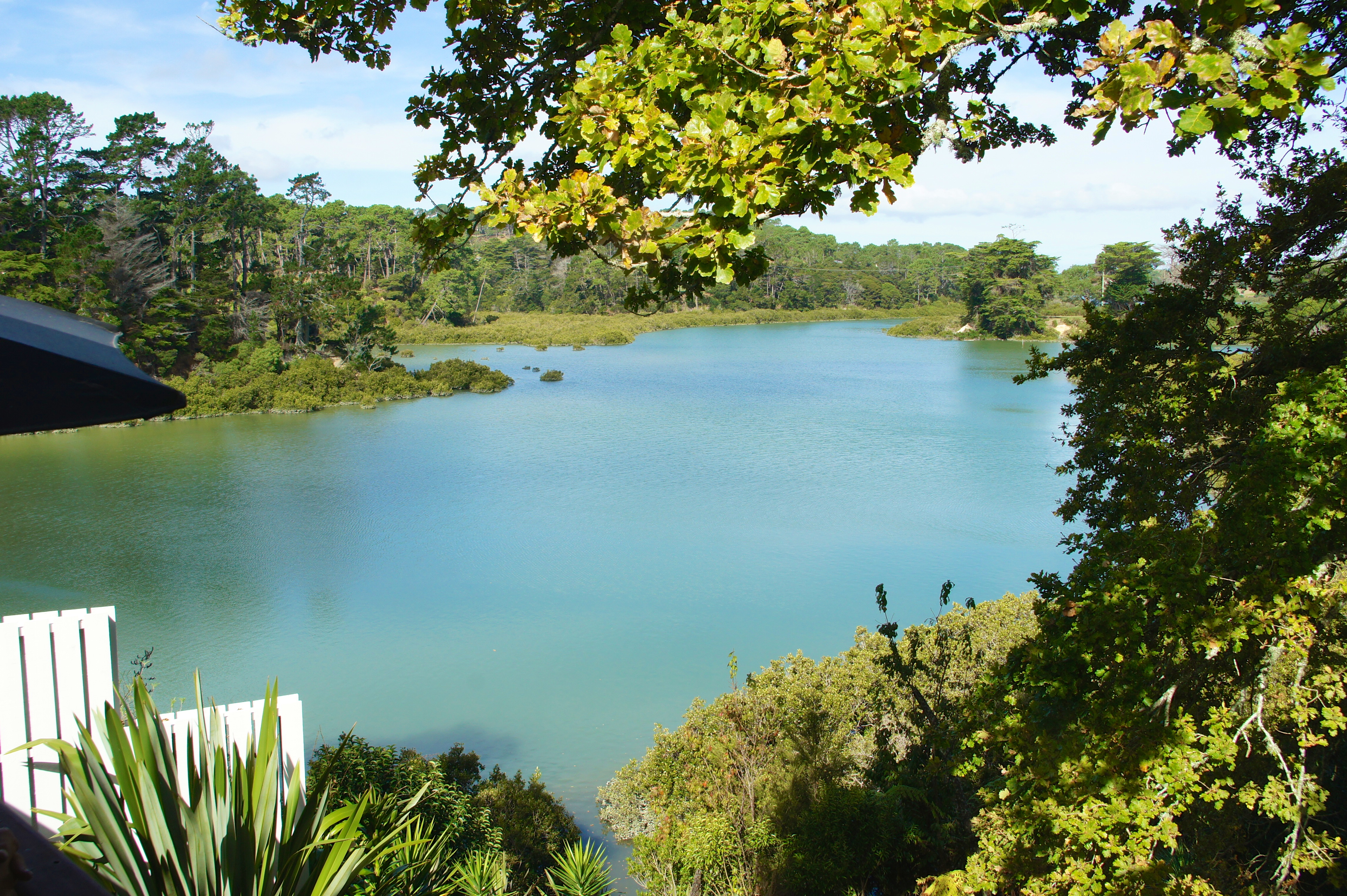
The Rangitōpuni Creek was the eastern end of Te Tōangaroa, a portage where waka could be hauled between the Kaipara Harbour and the Waitematā Harbour

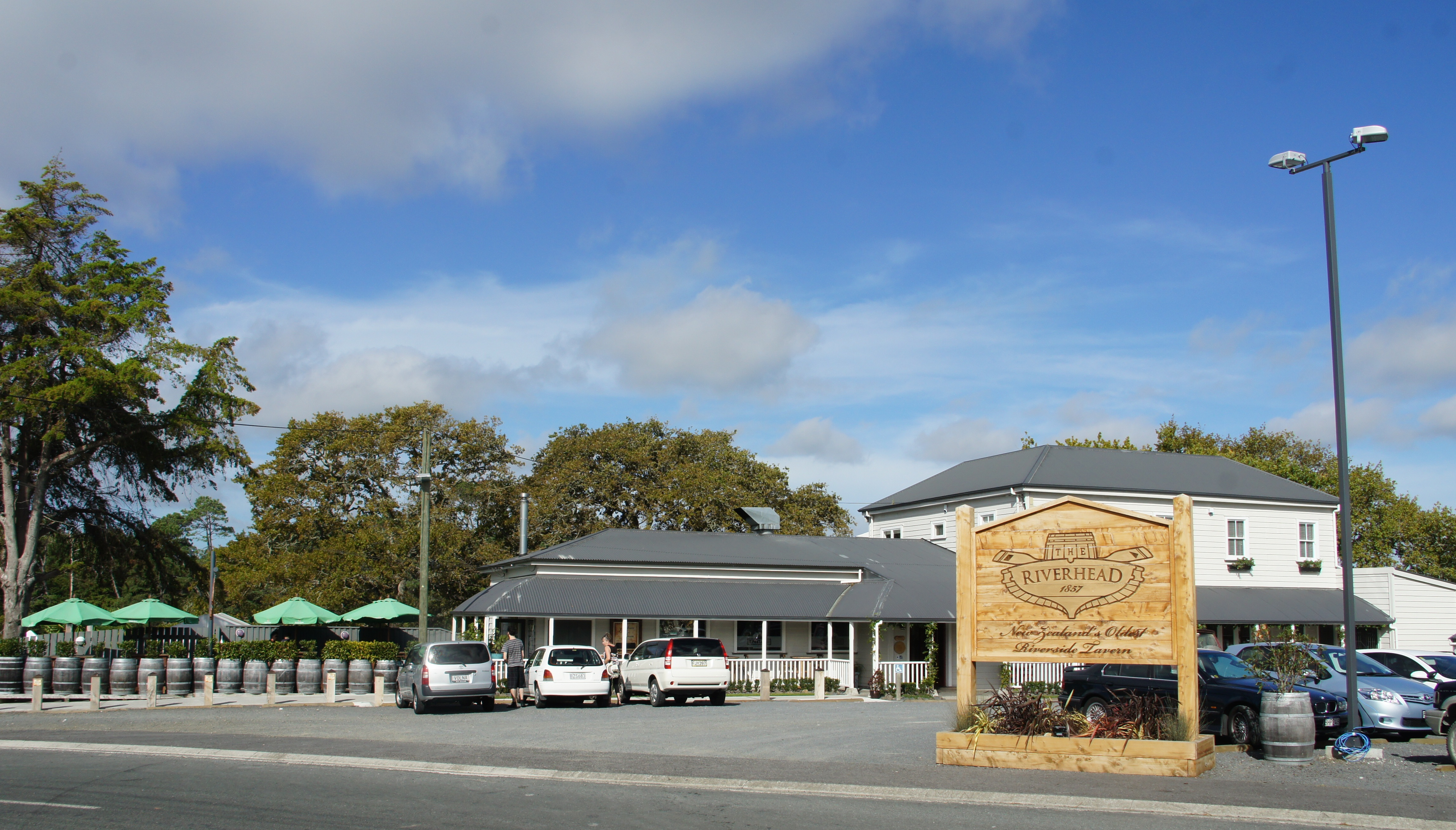
Riverhead Tavern was established in the early 1870s

The area is traditionally a part of rohe of the tribe Te Kawerau ā Maki and Ngāti Whātua o Kaipara, who referred to the wider area was known as Rangitōpuni. The name commemorates a day of peace-making between Te Kawerau ā Maki and other tribes in the early 19th century, and refers to the act of gifting dog-skin cloaks (tōpuni) that marked this day. There were many kāinga (villages) and localities to the West of Te Wairoa-ō-Kahu (the name for the Upper Waitematā Harbour), including Taurangatira, Maraeroa, Ngongetepara, Te Rarawaru, Onekiritea, Tahingamanu and Pītoitoi. The harbour around Riverhead was a source of seasonal shark and snapper for various Tāmaki Māori groups.

The area was an important transportation node due to Te Tōangaroa, a portage where waka could be hauled between the Kaipara Harbour and the Waitematā Harbour, via the Kaipara and Kumeū rivers.

European settlement of Riverhead began in 1844, when a kauri mill was established at Riverhead, due to the access the area had to the Waitematā Harbour, and the adjacent Rangitōpuni Stream providing fresh water and a way to power the mill. The mill operated between 1845 and 1856, after which it was repurposed as the Waitemata Flour Mill, the largest provider of flour in the Auckland Region. John Brigham's flour mill was sold in 1859 to his employee, John Lamb, who helped Riverhead develop into a village around the flour mill.

During the 1850s, a dray road was established primarily by Ngāti Whātua, which connected Riverhead and the Kumeū River, leading Riverhead to become known as the gateway to accessing the Kaipara Harbour. The track was narrow and often difficult to navigate due to poor weather conditions, leading to goods and people to be bottlenecked at Riverhead. In 1865, the Government funded road improvements to the track, and the Riverhead Hotel was established in either 1870 or 1871.

In 1875 after four years of construction, a railway between Kumeū and Riverhead was opened near the former dray road, which helped develop the Kumeū area. The line operated from 1875 to 1881 as a link from Auckland to regions north, with Riverhead acting as the transition point from ferry to railway. When the North Auckland Line connected Kumeū with Auckland via rail in 1881, the coastal shipping became unnecessary, and with no reason to continue operating, the railway to Riverhead was closed.

In 1876 the flour mill was relocated to central Auckland, and by the 1890s the Riverhead mill was repurposed a third time, as a paper mill. In the late 19th and early 20th centuries, Riverhead, Swanson and Henderson became major locations for the kauri gum digging trade. In 1914, the paper mill closed. After this time, Riverhead became known as a tobacco growing area. St Philip's Church was established at Riverhead in 1926.

During the 1920s, the rural area north of Riverhead was intended to be developed into farmland. Instead the government established Riverhead Forest, an exotic Pinus radiata timber forest. The first tree planting began in 1927, with the majority of the forest planted by 1933. As the forest matured, Riverhead began to be known for timber processing.

A boutique venue 3 kilometres northeast of Riverhead is used as the task venue in both the New Zealand and Australian versions of television series Taskmaster.

== Local government ==
From 1876 until 1974, Riverhead was administered by the Waitemata County, a large rural county north and west of the city of Auckland. After this, Riverhead became a part of Rodney County. In 1989, the county was abolished, and in its place the Rodney District was formed. Rodney District Council was amalgamated into Auckland Council in November 2010.

Within the Auckland Council, Riverhead is a part of the Rodney local government area governed by the Rodney Local Board. It is a part of the Rodney ward, which elects one councillor to the Auckland Council.

For general elections, Riverhead is in the Kaipara ki Mahurangi and Te Tai Tokerau electorates.

== Demographics ==
Riverhead covers 2.16 km^{2} (0.83 sq mi) and had an estimated population of 3,840 as of June 2025, with a population density of 1,778 people per km^{2}.

Historical population
Year	Pop.	±% p.a.
2006	1,305	—
2013	1,278	−0.30%
2018	2,724	+16.34%
2023	3,558	+5.49%
The 2006 population is for a larger area of 4.05 km^{2}. Source:

Riverhead had a population of 3,558 in the 2023 New Zealand census, an increase of 834 people (30.6%) since the 2018 census, and an increase of 2,280 people (178.4%) since the 2013 census. There were 1,746 males, 1,803 females and 12 people of other genders in 1,143 dwellings. 2.5% of people identified as LGBTIQ+. The median age was 37.0 years (compared with 38.1 years nationally). There were 921 people (25.9%) aged under 15 years, 495 (13.9%) aged 15 to 29, 1,800 (50.6%) aged 30 to 64, and 345 (9.7%) aged 65 or older.

People could identify as more than one ethnicity. The results were 85.7% European (Pākehā); 10.5% Māori; 3.5% Pasifika; 11.0% Asian; 1.6% Middle Eastern, Latin American and African New Zealanders (MELAA); and 1.4% other, which includes people giving their ethnicity as "New Zealander". English was spoken by 96.5%, Māori language by 1.2%, Samoan by 0.3%, and other languages by 12.3%. No language could be spoken by 2.6% (e.g. too young to talk). New Zealand Sign Language was known by 0.3%. The percentage of people born overseas was 27.2, compared with 28.8% nationally.

Religious affiliations were 23.4% Christian, 2.9% Hindu, 0.6% Islam, 0.2% Māori religious beliefs, 1.0% Buddhist, 0.3% New Age, 0.2% Jewish, and 1.2% other religions. People who answered that they had no religion were 64.0%, and 6.6% of people did not answer the census question.

Of those at least 15 years old, 666 (25.3%) people had a bachelor's or higher degree, 1,299 (49.3%) had a post-high school certificate or diploma, and 450 (17.1%) people exclusively held high school qualifications. The median income was $62,200, compared with $41,500 nationally. 747 people (28.3%) earned over $100,000 compared to 12.1% nationally. The employment status of those at least 15 was that 1,623 (61.5%) people were employed full-time, 378 (14.3%) were part-time, and 39 (1.5%) were unemployed.

== Education ==
Riverhead School is a coeducational full primary (years 1–8) school with a roll of 469 students as at July 2026. The school was built in 1872, and substantially rebuilt in 1960.

== Climate ==
Climate data for Riverhead (Riverhead Forest) (1960–1987 normals, extremes 1928–1987)
Month	Jan	Feb	Mar	Apr	May	Jun	Jul	Aug	Sep	Oct	Nov	Dec	Year
Record high °C (°F)	29.2 (84.6)	30.2 (86.4)	27.8 (82.0)	26.0 (78.8)	25.1 (77.2)	21.6 (70.9)	20.1 (68.2)	20.6 (69.1)	22.7 (72.9)	25.8 (78.4)	26.5 (79.7)	27.9 (82.2)	30.2 (86.4)
Mean maximum °C (°F)	26.9 (80.4)	27.0 (80.6)	25.9 (78.6)	23.6 (74.5)	20.7 (69.3)	18.6 (65.5)	17.7 (63.9)	18.0 (64.4)	19.4 (66.9)	21.3 (70.3)	23.5 (74.3)	25.6 (78.1)	27.7 (81.9)
Mean daily maximum °C (°F)	23.5 (74.3)	23.7 (74.7)	22.6 (72.7)	20.1 (68.2)	17.5 (63.5)	15.3 (59.5)	14.5 (58.1)	15.1 (59.2)	16.2 (61.2)	17.8 (64.0)	19.8 (67.6)	21.7 (71.1)	19.0 (66.2)
Daily mean °C (°F)	18.3 (64.9)	18.5 (65.3)	17.6 (63.7)	15.1 (59.2)	12.6 (54.7)	10.7 (51.3)	9.7 (49.5)	10.4 (50.7)	11.8 (53.2)	13.2 (55.8)	14.9 (58.8)	16.7 (62.1)	14.1 (57.4)
Mean daily minimum °C (°F)	13.0 (55.4)	13.3 (55.9)	12.5 (54.5)	10.1 (50.2)	7.7 (45.9)	6.0 (42.8)	5.0 (41.0)	5.8 (42.4)	7.4 (45.3)	8.6 (47.5)	10.1 (50.2)	11.7 (53.1)	9.3 (48.7)
Mean minimum °C (°F)	7.3 (45.1)	7.4 (45.3)	5.3 (41.5)	3.2 (37.8)	0.4 (32.7)	−1.2 (29.8)	−2.1 (28.2)	−1.1 (30.0)	0.5 (32.9)	1.8 (35.2)	3.3 (37.9)	5.6 (42.1)	−2.6 (27.3)
Record low °C (°F)	1.2 (34.2)	2.2 (36.0)	−0.8 (30.6)	−1.9 (28.6)	−2.8 (27.0)	−5.7 (21.7)	−5.0 (23.0)	−4.4 (24.1)	−2.9 (26.8)	−1.1 (30.0)	−1.7 (28.9)	−0.6 (30.9)	−5.7 (21.7)
Average rainfall mm (inches)	78.9 (3.11)	94.5 (3.72)	95.0 (3.74)	120.4 (4.74)	125.3 (4.93)	167.4 (6.59)	154.6 (6.09)	138.1 (5.44)	125.3 (4.93)	96.2 (3.79)	98.0 (3.86)	106.1 (4.18)	1,399.8 (55.12)
Source: NIWA

== Bibliography ==
- Diamond, John T.; Hayward, Bruce W. (1990). "Prehistoric Sites in West Auckland". In Northcote-Bade, James (ed.). West Auckland Remembers, Volume 1. West Auckland Historical Society. pp. 33–41. ISBN 0-473-00983-8.
- Dunsford, Deborah (2002). Doing It Themselves: the Story of Kumeu, Huapai and Taupaki. Huapai-Kumeu Lions Club. ISBN 0-473-08969-6.
