= Portages of New Zealand =

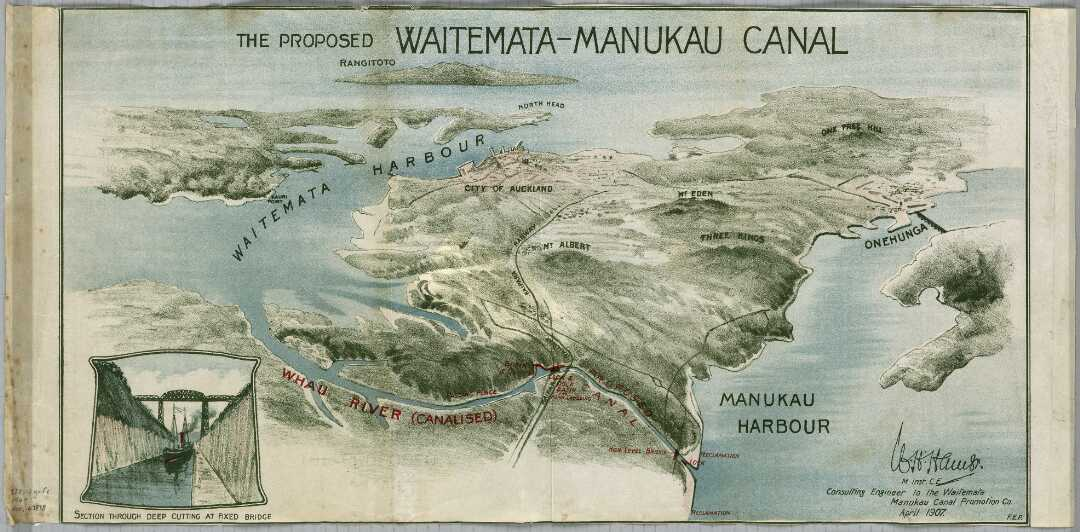
A number of traditional portages were proposed as sites where canals could be built (pictured: the proposed Waitematā-Manukau harbour canal, along Te Toanga Waka (the Whau River portage) in 1907)

Portages in New Zealand, known in Māori as Tō or Tōanga Waka, are locations where waka (canoes) could easily be transported overland. Portages were extremely important for early Māori, especially along the narrow Tāmaki isthmus of modern-day Auckland, as they served as crucial transportation and trade links between the east and west coasts. Portages can be found across New Zealand, especially in the narrow Northland and Auckland regions, and the rivers of the Waikato Region.

A number of historic portages were considered for potential sites for canals during the colonial era and the early 1900s. Since the early 1990s, portage crossing events have been held on the Ōtāhuhu portage.

== Northland Region ==
Locations of portages in Northland
1 Mangapai (Kaipara Harbour to Whangārei Harbour)
2 Ōtamatea (Kaipara Harbour to Mangawhai Harbour)

=== Mangapai portage ===
The Mangapai portage connected the Kaipara Harbour in the west to the Whangārei Harbour in the east. The portage extended from the Wairoa River, overland through Tangiteroria to Maungakaramea, reaching the Whangārei Harbour along the Mangapai River.

Bishop Samuel Marsden reported Hongi Hika using this portage during the Musket Wars in 1820.

=== Ōtamatea portage ===
The Ōtamatea portage connected the Kaipara Harbour in the west to the Mangawhai Harbour in the east, via the Otamatea River, Hakaru River and the Kaiwaka River.

== Auckland Region ==
Locations of portages in the Auckland Region
1 Aotoetoe and Weiti (Kaipara Harbour to Whangaparāoa)
2 Waiau (Whangaparāoa)
3 Te Tōangaroa (Kaipara Harbour to Waitematā Harbour)
4 Takapuna (Waitematā to Hauraki Gulf)
5 Whau (Waitematā Harbour to Manukau Harbour)
6 Karetu (Tāmaki River to Manukau Harbour)
7 Te Tō Waka (Ōtāhuhu) (Tāmaki River to Manukau Harbour)
8 Waokauri (Tāmaki River to Manukau Harbour)
9 Papakura (Manukau Harbour to Wairoa River/Hauraki Gulf)
10 Pokorua (Manukau Harbour to Tasman Sea)
11 Te Pai o Kaiwaka (Manukau Harbour to Waikato River)

Portages formed important links between the east and west coasts of the Auckland region. Some of the most frequently used portages were those on either side of the Auckland isthmus: the Te Tō Waka portage at Ōtāhuhu (the shortest portage between the east and west coasts), alongside the Karetu and Waokauri / Pūkaki portages, connected the estuarial Tāmaki River to the Manukau Harbour in the west, while Te Toanga Waka, the Whau River portage, connected the Waitematā Harbour to the Manukau Harbour in the west. After these portages were used, a second portage, Te Pai o Kaiwaka at Waiuku, could be used to access the Waikato River in the south. Another major link was Te Tōangaroa, which bridged the gap between the Waitematā Harbour and the Kaipara River/Kumeū River system, which connected to the Kaipara Harbour in the north.

=== Opou portage ===
The Opou portage linked two arms of the Kaipara Harbour, the Oruawharo River and the Tauhoa River, separated by the Okahukura Peninsula, at the site of the modern-day Ātiu Creek Regional Park.

=== Aotoetoe and Weiti portages ===
The Aotoetoe and Weiti portages connected the Kaipara Harbour in the west to Whangaparāoa and the Hibiscus Coast in the east. The Weiti Portage crossed overland between the Kaukapakapa River and the Weiti River, while the Aotoetoe portage travelled north between the Kaukapakapa River and the Orewa River.

=== Waiau portage ===
The Waiau portage bisects the Whangaparāoa Peninsula between Tindalls Beach and Matakatia. It is likely that another portage existed on the peninsula to the west, connecting Red Beach to the Weiti River.

=== Albany portage ===
The Albany portage was a path that connected the Lucas Creek, an arm of the Upper Waitematā Harbour, to the Okura River and Long Bay on the Hauraki Gulf. Some sources describe the portage as linking Lucas Creek to Browns Bay.

=== Te Tōangaroa ===
Te Tōangaroa, also known as the Ngongitepata or Riverhead portage, is the portage linking the Kaipara Harbour with the Waitematā Harbour via the Kaipara River and Kumeū River. The portage could be travelled to across either Rangitōpuni (Riverhead) in the north, or at Pitoitoi (Brigham's Creek) in the south.

During the colonial era of New Zealand, Te Tōangaroa became a coach route for early labourers. A canal was proposed to bridge the gap between the two rivers, however this was found to be too expensive. Instead, the Kumeu–Riverhead Railway was constructed, operating between 1875 and 1881 when the North Auckland Line was opened between Helensville and Auckland.

=== Takapuna and Kukuwaka portages ===
A portage at Takapuna linked Oneoneroa / Shoal Bay in the Waitematā Harbour with St Leonards Bay. A natural tidal portage known as Kukuwaka linked Ngatarina Bay and Narrow Neck Beach, at the location of the reclaimed land where the Waitemata Golf Club currently exists. The name Kukuwaka literally refers to scratched/damaged waka.

=== Whau portage ===
The Whau portage, traditionally known as Te Tōanga Waka and Te Tōanga Waka ki Motukaraka, linked the west coast Manukau Harbour to the east coast Waitematā Harbour via a north-south route, following the Whau River, the Avondale Stream (Wai Tahurangi); which in modern times is marked by Portage Road. Most of the portage was easily traversable, with waka able to be paddled to Kotuitanga (Ken Maunder Park) and relatively easily moved along the Avondale Stream. The main exception was the steep hill above Green Bay, where terracing is still visible. The Whau portage was one of the most important in the Auckland region, and Te Whau pā, adjacent to the Manukau Harbour entrance to the route, controlled the waka traffic along the route. A kāinga existed at the end of the portage at Green Bay, known as Motu Karaka as a grove of sacred karaka trees grew nearby.

The Whau river and portage serves as a rohe (boundary) point between Te Kawerau ā Maki and the tribes of the Auckland isthmus: Ngāti Whātua Ōrākei and in earlier times the Waiohua.

In the latter 19th century, a canal was proposed along the Whau Portage, however this was abandoned after the North Island Main Trunk railway connected Auckland and Wellington in the 1910s.

=== Karetu portage ===
The Karetu was the northernmost of three portages connecting the Manukau Harbour and the Tāmaki River. It connected Anns Creek (the north-east stream of the Māngere Inlet to Karetu, south of the Panmure Basin, approximately one kilometre south of Mutukaroa / Hamlins Hill Regional Park. Compared to the shorter Te Tō Waka, the Karetu portage had less elevation.

=== Te Tō Waka ===
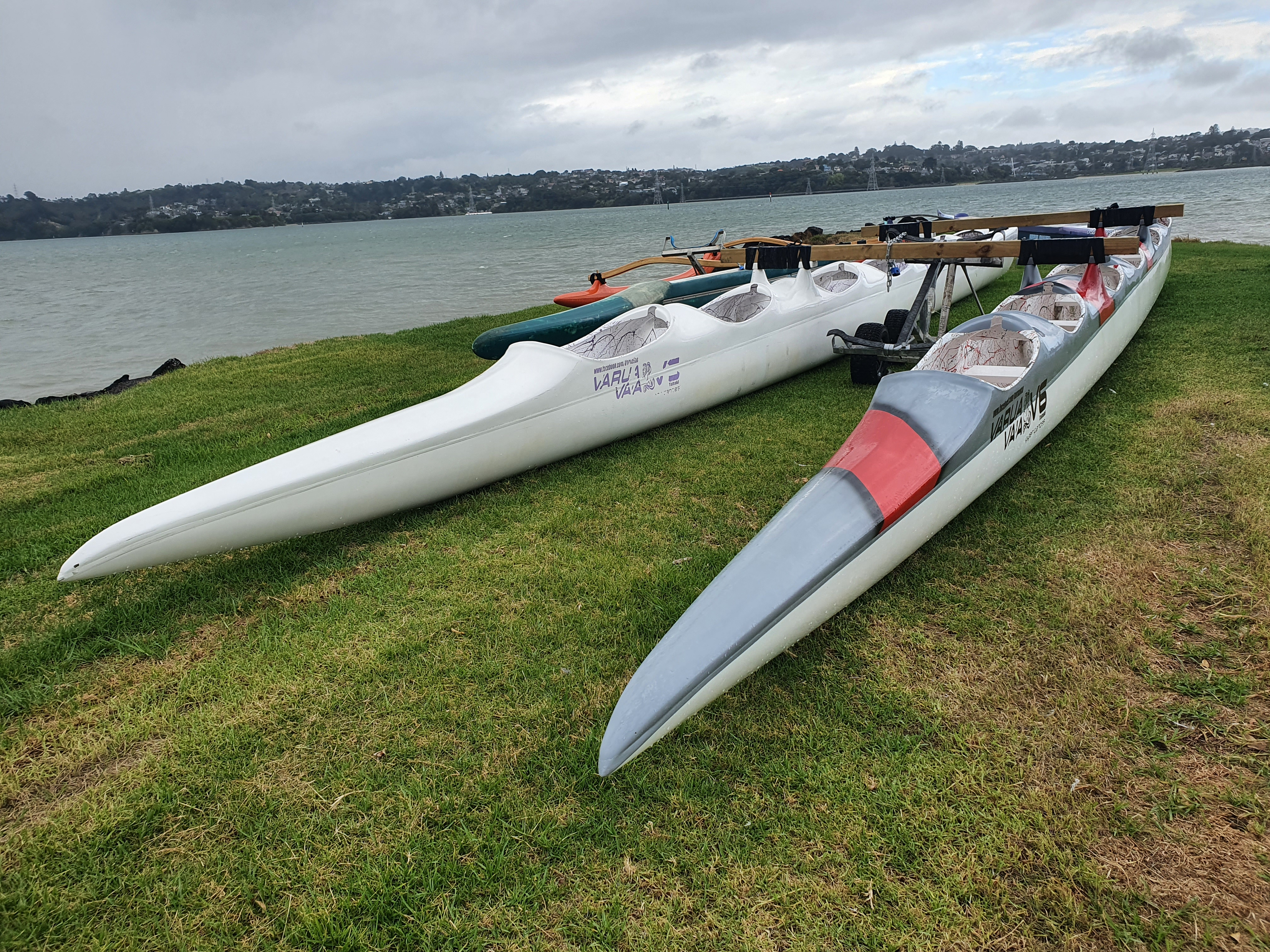
Outrigger canoes used by the Portage Crossing Canoe Club for events such as the annual waka ama crossing of Te Tō Waka

Te Tō Waka, also known as Te Toangakiōtāhuhu, the Ōtāhuhu portage, Tauoma portage or the Tāmaki portage, is the shortest portage connecting the east and west coasts of New Zealand, located at Ōtāhuhu. The portage connected the Māngere Inlet of the Manukau Harbour south of Ōtāhuhu / Mount Richmond to the Tāmaki River, using the approximate route taken by the modern Portage Road. Due to its short length and easy gradient, it was one of the most important portages in Aotearoa, and one of the main communication links between Northland and the central North Island.

Te Tō Waka was used from the earliest times of Māori settlement in Aotearoa. The portage features prominently in the stories of the Tainui migratory waka, as the crew used the portage to cross westwards to the Manukau Harbour. This event is memorialised in the name Te Tapotu o Tainui, also used for the portage, and Ngarango Otainui Island, the island of the Māngere Inlet where the wooden skids used to haul the waka were left after the trip was made. In addition to the Tainui, other migratory waka including the Matahourua of Kupe, the Aotea, the Mātaatua and the Tokomaru all have traditional stories associated with the crossing of this portage.

The area was a settling place for Ngāi Tahuhu, an early Tāmaki Māori iwi, whose rohe (lands) extended to either side of the portage. The iwi had a defensive pā on Ōtāhuhu / Mount Richmond, known as Te Pā o Tahuhu, which was used to watch over traffic that used the portage. Te Ākitai Waiohua were based at the Ōtāhuhu portage during the early 1800s. Later in the 1820s century during the Musket Wars, Te Tō Waka was frequently used by Ngāpuhi and other northern iwi. The existence of the portage and its frequent use by war taua was one of the major reasons why much of the region was deserted during the Musket Wars. The European township of Ōtāhuhu, which was established in 1847 as a fencible settlement, flourished due to its strategic location at Te Tō Waka, linking to both the Manukau Harbour and the Tāmaki River.

Royal engineer Thomas R Moule first recommended the construction of a canal along Te Tō Waka in the 1860s, referring to it as the Tamaki Canal Scheme. Due to this, the suggested pathway of the canal became the Canal Reserve, and was protected from major developments. In 1886, WN Blair of the Public Works Department mooted the idea again, while also noting that the canal would need a lock to compensate for the different tides on the east and west coasts. Between the 1890s and his death in 1924, John Edward Taylor of the Auckland Harbour Board promoted the idea of a canal with locks at the Māngere and Panmure bridges. On 30 September 1911, Taylor formally petitioned the New Zealand Government to create the canal, and a second at Te Pai o Kaiwaka (Waiuku township), to connect to the Waikato River. Taylor's petition was unsuccessful. The idea was investigated again in the 1960s by the Ministry of Works.

Beginning in February 1992, Māngere resident James Papali'i of the Portage Crossing Canoe Club began organising annual waka ama events tracing the route the Tainui waka took when crossing Te Tō Waka.

=== Waokauri / Pūkaki portage ===
The Waokauri / Pūkaki portage is the southernmost of the three portages connecting the Manukau Harbour to the Tāmaki River. The portage connected the Waokauri and Pūkaki creeks to the Tāmaki River via Papatoetoe and Middlemore. A road named Portage Road traces the overland passage this portage took.

=== Papakura portage ===
The Papakura portage connected the Manukau Harbour at Papakura in the west to the Wairoa River in the east, likely along the path of the Old Wairoa Road.

=== Pokorua portage ===
The Pokorua linked the Tasman Sea to the Manukau Harbour via Lake Pokorua on the Āwhitu Peninsula and the Waiuku River. The portage was used because of the dangerous Manukau Harbour heads.

=== Te Pai o Kaiwaka ===
Locations of portages in the Central North Island
1 Te Pai o Kaiwaka (Manukau Harbour to Waikato River)
2 Mangawara portage (Waikato River to Piako River)
3 Te Ara-o-Hinehopu (Lake Rotoiti to Lake Rotoehu)
4 Whanganui-Waikato portage

Te Pai o Kaiwaka, also known as the Awaroa or Waiuku portage, connected the Manukau Harbour to the Waikato River in the south, via the Awaroa Stream. During the Musket Wars in the early 19th century, Te Pai o Kaiwaka was used by Hongi Hika and Ngāpuhi taua in order to reach the Waikato Tainui tribes of the central Waikato area. The canal continued to be used in the early colonial era by Māori, in order to transport produce from the Waikato to be sold at Onehunga.

On 30 September 1911, J E Taylor of the Auckland Harbour Board petitioned the New Zealand Government to create a canal at the site of Te Tō Waka (the Ōtāhuhu portage), with the Māngere Bridge acting as a canal lock. Taylor also proposed a second canal at Te Pai o Kaiwaka, to connect to the Waikato River. Taylor's petition was unsuccessful. The canal continued to be mooted as an idea, and in 1924 the Waiuku Canal League is formed as a body to promote the concept.

== Waikato ==
In addition to Te Pai o Kaiwaka at Waiuku, a number of other portages existed, bridging the rivers of the Waikato region. The Mangawara portage connected the Waikato River to the Piako River, via the Mangawara Stream and an overland route at Tahuna. A portage also existed between the Whanganui River and the Waikato River, via Lake Rotoaira, Tongariro River and Lake Taupō.

== Bay of Plenty Region ==
Te Ara-o-Hinehopu, also known as Hongi's Track, is a walking track and portage between Lake Rotoiti and Lake Rotoehu. The track was named for Hinehopu, and ancestress who used it to travel between her two homes. The name Hongi's Track recalls an incident during the Musket Wars, when Hongi Hika and a Ngāpuhi taua used the track as a waka portage to reach the Te Arawa settlement on Mokoia Island in Lake Rotorua.
