= Westgate, New Zealand =

Suburb of Auckland, New Zealand

Westgate
- Suburb
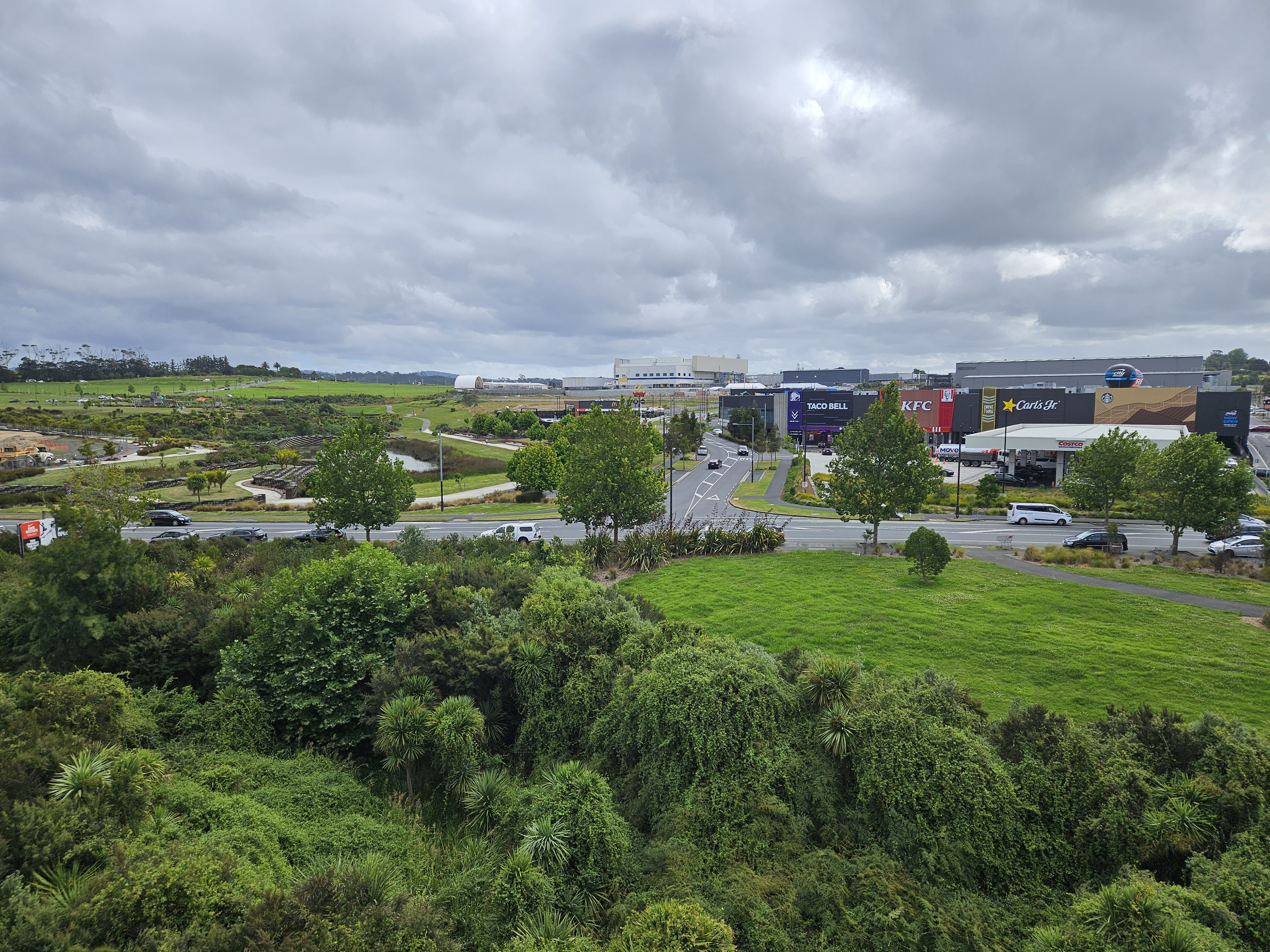
- Commercial buildings and Kopupaka Reserve in Westgate
- Interactive map of Westgate
- Coordinates: 36.82139°S 174.61139°E
- Country: New Zealand
- City: Auckland
- Local authority: Auckland Council
- Electoral ward: Waitākere ward
- Local board: Henderson-Massey Local Board

Area
  - Land: 186 ha (460 acres)

Population (June 2025)
  - Total: 20
  - Density: 11/km^{2} (28/sq mi)
- Postcode: 0614

Kumeū	Whenuapai	Hobsonville
Taupaki	Westgate	West Harbour
Waitākere	Massey West	Massey

Westgate, formerly Massey North is a suburb and metropolitan centre in Auckland, New Zealand.

== Etymology ==
The original name of the area was Massey North, but by the 2000s the name of the shopping centre had begun to be used for the general area instead. Originally Auckland Council had proposed the name Kedgley be used but this name was rejected due to it being the personal name of a living person. In 2013 the New Zealand Geographic Board changed the name of the suburb from Massey North to Westgate.

== History ==
In 1999 the Waitakere City Council planned for a new town centre in Massey North. The council contributed towards the cost of roads and for a new library and public square. The new town centre was envisioned as a way for Waitakere City residents to not have to travel to Auckland for services and work.

== Te Manawa ==
Te Manawa is a public library in the new Westgate town centre that opened in March 2019. The building was designed by Warren and Mahoney and built by Fletcher Construction. The building won the 2020 New Zealand Institute of Architects Auckland Awards Public Architecture. The name Te Manawa means 'the heart' in the Māori language.

== Demographics ==
Westgate Central statistical area covers 1.86 km^{2} (0.72 sq mi) and had an estimated population of 20 as of June 2025, with a population density of 11 people per km^{2}.

Historical population
Year	Pop.	±% p.a.
2006	87	—
2013	78	−1.55%
2018	42	−11.65%
2023	15	−18.61%

Westgate Central had a population of 15 in the 2023 New Zealand census, a decrease of 27 people (−64.3%) since the 2018 census, and a decrease of 63 people (−80.8%) since the 2013 census. There were 6 males and 9 females. The median age was 26.6 years (compared with 38.1 years nationally). There were 6 people (40.0%) aged under 15 years, 3 (20.0%) aged 15 to 29, 3 (20.0%) aged 30 to 64, and 3 (20.0%) aged 65 or older.

People could identify as more than one ethnicity. The results were 80.0% European (Pākehā), 60.0% Māori, and 20.0% Pasifika. English was spoken by 100.0%, and Māori language by 40.0%.

The median income was $64,300, compared with $41,500 nationally.

== Economy ==
Westgate Shopping Centre was established in 1998. It covers 18,916 m^{2}.

NorthWest Shopping Centre was established in Westgate in 2015. It covers 27,000 m^{2} with about 100 retailers.
