= Jessica Rowe (politician) =

New Zealand politician

Member of the New Zealand Parliament for Kaipara ki Mahurangi
- Incumbent
- Assumed office 7 November 2026
- Preceded by: Chris Penk

Personal details
- Born: Riverhead, New Zealand
- Party: National Party

Jessica Rowe is a New Zealand journalist and politician. She was elected to the New Zealand House of Representatives at the 2026 New Zealand general election as a National Party MP for the electorate of Kaipara ki Mahurangi.

== Early life ==
Rowe was born and raised in Riverhead, growing up on the family farm. The family ran a haberdashery in Auckland. She has a Masters in Global Diplomacy.

== Career ==
Rowe worked as a journalist. She was a reporter for Newshub. Rowe was a television presenter. She worked as a ministerial advisor to Louise Upston. She was employed at the Ministry of Foreign Affairs and Trade. She advised on foreign policy.

== Political career ==
New Zealand Parliament
Years	Term	Electorate	List	Party
2026–present	55th	Kaipara ki Mahurangi	-	National

Rowe was the National Party candidate for Kaipara ki Mahurangi at the 2026 New Zealand general election. She was selected to replace former Minister of Defence Chris Penk who did not stand again. On 7 November, Rowe retained Kaipara ki Mahurangi for National via a landslide margin of 12,592 votes based on preliminary results.
