= Kumeū River =

River in the Auckland Region, New Zealand

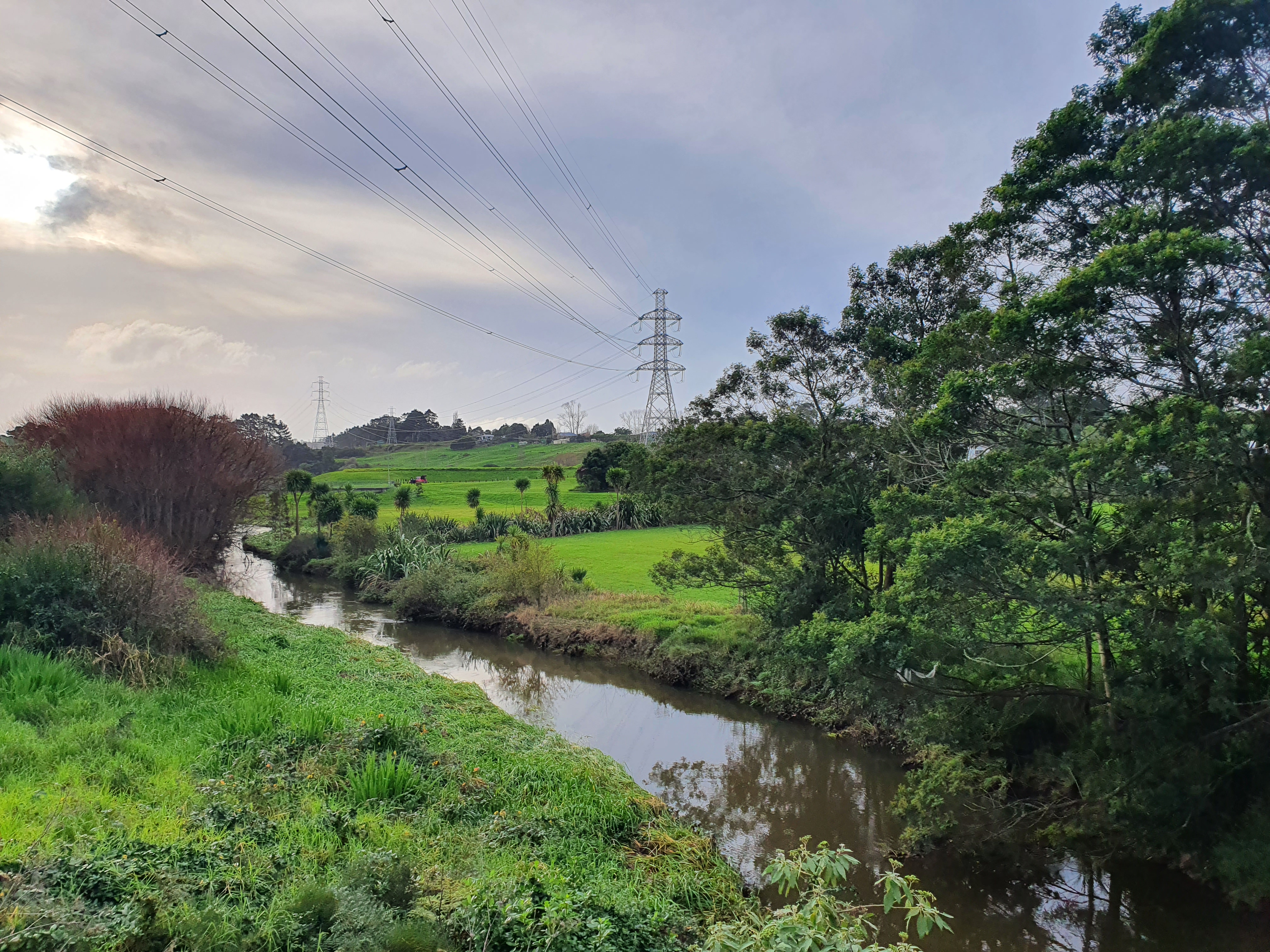
- The Kumeū River at Kumeū township

- Mouth of the Kumeū River Kumeū River (New Zealand)
- Route of the Kumeū River
- Native name: Te Awa Kumeū (Māori)

Location
- Country: New Zealand
- Region: Auckland Region

Physical characteristics
- Source: Te Henga Road ridge, Waitākere Ranges
  - coordinates: 36.87581°S 174.53328°E
- Mouth: Kaipara River
  - coordinates: 36.75892°S 174.50871°E
- Length: 20 km (12 mi)

Basin features
- Progression: Kumeū River → Kaipara River → Kaipara Harbour
- Tributaries
  - left: Mangatoetoe Stream
  - right: Matariki Stream, Huranui Stream, McEntee Stream, King Stream, Le Gros Stream, Inkster Stream, Rackstraw Stream, Pakinui Stream, Waikoukou Stream

The Kumeū River drains the northern Waitākere Ranges near Auckland, New Zealand, running past the town of Kumeū before merging into the Kaipara River.

== Description ==
The river begins north of the Te Henga Road ridge, north of the Waitākere Ranges Regional Park. It flows north to the townships of Waitākere and Taupaki. When the river reaches Kumeū and Huapai, it flows due west, meeting the Ahukuramu Stream. The Kaipara River begins at the confluence of the Kumeū River and Ahukuramu Stream.

The river has a number of tributaries, including the McEntee Stream, Mangatoetoe Stream and Pakinui Stream.

== History ==
The stream is in the traditional rohe of Te Kawerau ā Maki. Historically the upper river catchment was dominated by a kahikatea forest, and was used for a number of purposes: to hunt kūkupa (kererū, or New Zealand wood pigeon) and harvest harakeke (New Zealand flax) and toetoe (Austroderia) for weaving.

The river formed a section of Te Tōangaroa, the portage between the Kaipara and the Waitematā Harbours. Ngongetepara (Brigham Creek) is less than two kilometres away from the Kumeū River at its closest point.

The traditional taniwha kaitiaki (guardian) of the Kaipara and Kumeū Rivers was called Tangihua.
