= Kaipara ki Mahurangi =

- Single-member general constituency for the New Zealand House of Representatives
- Interactive map of boundaries from the 2026 election
- Formation: 2020
- Region: Auckland
- Character: Suburban and rural
- Term: 3 years

Member for Kaipara ki Mahurangi
- Jessica Rowe since 7 November 2026
- Party: National
- List MPs: Jenny Marcroft (NZ First)
- Previous MP: null
Party vote distribution

Kaipara ki Mahurangi is an electorate to the New Zealand House of Representatives. It was created for the 2020 election.

== Population centres ==
Map of boundaries at the 2020 and 2023 general elections

The electorate consists of a large northern section of the Auckland Region. It stretches from the border with Northland to the northwestern end of Waitematā Harbour, and consists mostly of various satellite towns north of Auckland. Population centres within the electorate include:

- Wellsford
- Warkworth
- Snells Beach
- Helensville
- Waimauku
- Huapai
- Kumeū
- Riverhead
- Muriwai

== History ==
The electorate was created after rapid population growth in the former Rodney electorate caused the northern section to be carved off and incorporated into Helensville, which in turn lost the Waitakere Ranges to New Lynn and an area around Coatesville and Dairy Flat to Whangaparāoa (the former Rodney). Initially, it was proposed to keep the name Helensville, but after opposition from residents in the Kowhai Coast area, that name was scrapped and it was named Kaipara ki Mahurangi instead.

In the 2025 boundary review, continued population growth in northern Auckland led to the transfer of Westgate and Whenuapai to Upper Harbour. An area west of Massey was shifted into the reinstated Henderson electorate, and a small area south of Coatesville was taken from Whangaparāoa and added to Kaipara ki Mahurangi,

The electorate draws its name from two areas of geographic importance, the Kaipara Harbour, in the west of the electorate, and the Mahurangi River, which is located on the eastern end of the constituency. Translated, the name essentially means Kaipara to Mahurangi, or Kaipara-Mahurangi.

=== Members of Parliament ===
Key National

Election	Winner
2020 election	Chris Penk
2023 election	Chris Penk
2026 election	Jessica Rowe

=== List MPs ===
Members of Parliament elected from party lists in elections where that person also unsuccessfully contested the Kaipara ki Mahurangi electorate. Unless otherwise stated, all MPs' terms began and ended at general elections.

Key Labour NZ First

Election	
2020 election	Marja Lubeck
2023 election	Jenny Marcroft

== Election results ==
=== 2026 election ===
2026 general election: Kaipara ki Mahurangi
Notes:	Blue background denotes the winner of the electorate vote. Pink background denotes a candidate elected from their party list. Yellow background denotes an electorate win by a list member, or other incumbent. A ✓ or ✗ denotes status of any incumbent, win or lose respectively.						
Party	Candidate	Votes	%	±%	Party votes	%	±%
National	Jessica Rowe	19,297	50.61	−6.99	14,220	37.29	−10.34
Labour	Jolyon Swinburn	6,705	17.59	−0.37	6,452	16.92	−0.04
ACT	Simon Court	2,856	7.49	+1.45	6,567	17.22	+5.16
NZ First	Jenny Marcroft	2,753	7.22	+2.07	4,904	12.86	+6.22
Green	Zephyr Brown	2,726	7.15	−2.50	3,408	8.94	−0.63
Opportunity	Daniel Eb	1,381	3.62		2,114	5.54	+3.71
Independent	Ivan Wagstaff	1,124	2.95				
Independent	Mark Dennis	956	2.51				
Outdoors	Liz Dotcom	116	0.30		40	0.10	
Animal Justice					74	0.19	−0.03
Legalise Cannabis					65	0.17	−0.20
Te Pāti Māori					33	0.09	−0.58
Women's Rights					28	0.07	−0.01
Conservative					25	0.07	−0.08
NZ Loyal					16	0.04	−1.71
FPP					12	0.03	
Alliance					7	0.02	
Vision NZ					7	0.02	
Te Tai Tokerau					3	0.01	
Informal votes		213			156		
Total valid votes		38,127			38,131		
National hold	Majority	12,592	33.03	−6.60			

The next election will be held on 7 November 2026. Candidates for Kaipara ki Mahurangi are listed at Candidates in the 2026 New Zealand general election by electorate § Kaipara ki Mahurangi. Official results will be available after 27 November 2026. Due to Chris Penk's failed National Party leadership coup against Christopher Luxon, Penk will not seek re-election in the 2026 election.

=== 2023 election ===
2023 general election: Kaipara ki Mahurangi
Notes:	Blue background denotes the winner of the electorate vote. Pink background denotes a candidate elected from their party list. Yellow background denotes an electorate win by a list member, or other incumbent. A ✓ or ✗ denotes status of any incumbent, win or lose respectively.						
Party	Candidate	Votes	%	±%	Party votes	%	±%
National	✓ Chris Penk	28,281	57.60	+12.81	23,725	47.63	+13.80
Labour	Guy Wishart	8,822	17.96	−17.09	8,450	16.96	−23.19
Green	Zephyr Brown	4,739	9.65	+3.27	4,767	9.57	+3.29
ACT	Brent Bailey	2,970	6.04	−0.52	6,011	12.06	+0.84
NZ First	Jenny Marcroft	2,531	5.15	+2.47	3,311	6.64	+4.07
DemocracyNZ	Sarah Brewer	1,292	2.63	+2.63	300	0.60	
Opportunities					914	1.83	+0.54
NZ Loyal					874	1.75	+1.75
NewZeal					365	0.73	+0.73
Te Pāti Māori					338	0.67	+0.40
Legalise Cannabis					186	0.37	+0.05
Freedoms NZ					126	0.25	+0.25
Animal Justice					113	0.22	+0.22
New Conservatives					75	0.15	−1.33
Women's Rights					44	0.08	+0.08
New Nation					31	0.06	+0.06
Leighton Baker Party					24	0.04	+0.04
Informal votes		460			148		
Total valid votes		49,095			49,802		
National hold	Majority	19,459	39.63	+29.89			

=== 2020 election ===
2020 general election: Kaipara ki Mahurangi
Notes:	Blue background denotes the winner of the electorate vote. Pink background denotes a candidate elected from their party list. Yellow background denotes an electorate win by a list member, or other incumbent. A ✓ or ✗ denotes status of any incumbent, win or lose respectively.						
Party	Candidate	Votes	%	±%	Party votes	%	±%
National	✓ Chris Penk	20,402	44.79	—	15,547	33.83	—
Labour	Marja Lubeck	15,967	35.05	—	18,451	40.15	—
ACT	Beth Houlbrooke	2,989	6.56	—	5,158	11.22	—
Green	Zephyr Brown	2,904	6.38	—	2,887	6.28	—
NZ First	Brenda Steele	1,220	2.68	—	1,181	2.57	—
New Conservative	Pauline Berry	686	1.51	—	682	1.48	—
Independent	David Ford	248	0.54	—			
ONE	Richard Reeves	208	0.46	—	142	0.31	—
Social Credit	Callan Neylon	198	0.43	—	41	0.09	—
Advance NZ					671	1.46	—
Opportunities					591	1.29	—
Legalise Cannabis					146	0.32	—
Māori Party					126	0.27	—
Outdoors					59	0.13	—
Sustainable NZ					54	0.12	—
TEA					16	0.03	—
Vision New Zealand					10	0.02	—
Heartland					7	0.02	—
Informal votes		730			191		
Total valid votes		45,552			45,960		
Turnout		46,094	86.82	—			
National win new seat	Majority	4,435	9.74				
