= NorthWest Shopping Centre =

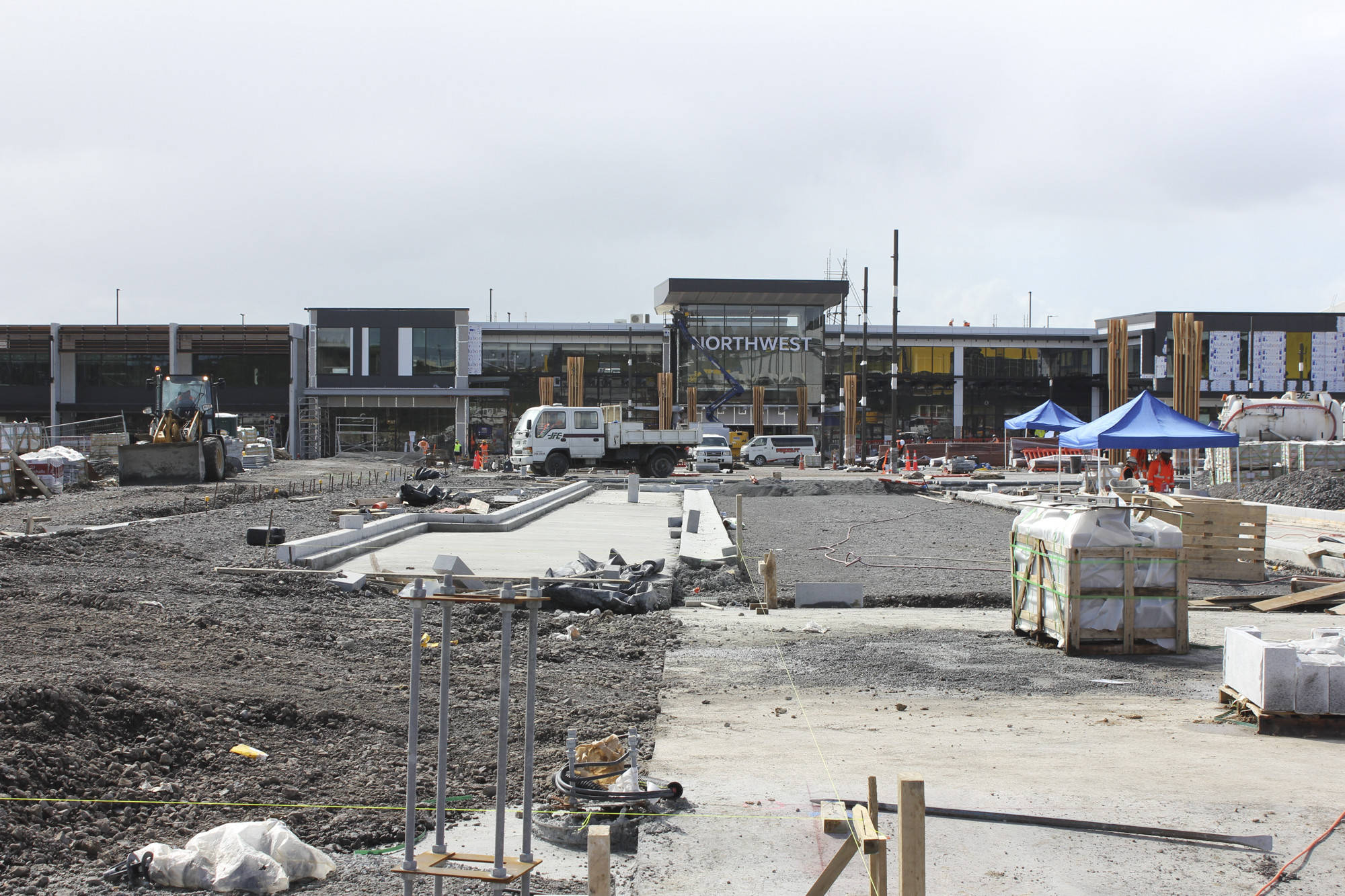
- NorthWest Shopping Centre during construction in July 2015
- Location: Westgate, Auckland, New Zealand
- Coordinates: 36.81796°S 174.61151°E
- Opened: October 1, 2015; 11 years ago
- Manager: Stride Property
- Owner: Stride Property
- Num. of stores: 100
- Num. of anchor tenants: 2
- Floor area: 27,000 m^{2} (290,626 sq ft) + 7,700 m^{2} (82,882 sq ft)
- Floors: 2
- Website: northwestshoppingcentre.co.nz

NorthWest Shopping Centre is a shopping mall located in Westgate, a suburb in the northwest of Auckland, New Zealand. It is situated on the other side of Fred Taylor Drive from the pre-existing Westgate Shopping Centre. The shopping centre was opened on 1 October 2015 and consists of 100 shops on 2.7 hectares (27,000 m^{2}) of internal floorspace. Major anchor tenants at the mall include Farmers and Woolworths. NorthWest is owned and managed by Stride Property (formerly DNZ Property Fund).

At the time of its opening it was expected to create up to 700 jobs.

NorthWest Stage 2 was opened in October 2016 and contains restaurants, retailers and offices around Te Pumanawa Square. Another 300 jobs were created by the 7,700 square metre extension, in addition to the existing 700 jobs.

In 2017, Auckland Council and the developer of the mall sought dispute resolution over deferred payment of fees. There were also issues of use of a traffic island that was part of the council's plan for an intersection upgrade, and the need to abandon a bus interchange on a footpath that was on land owned by the developer.

As of 2017, the mall has 32,500 m^{2} of lettable area.

== See also ==
- List of shopping centres in New Zealand
