= Taupaki =

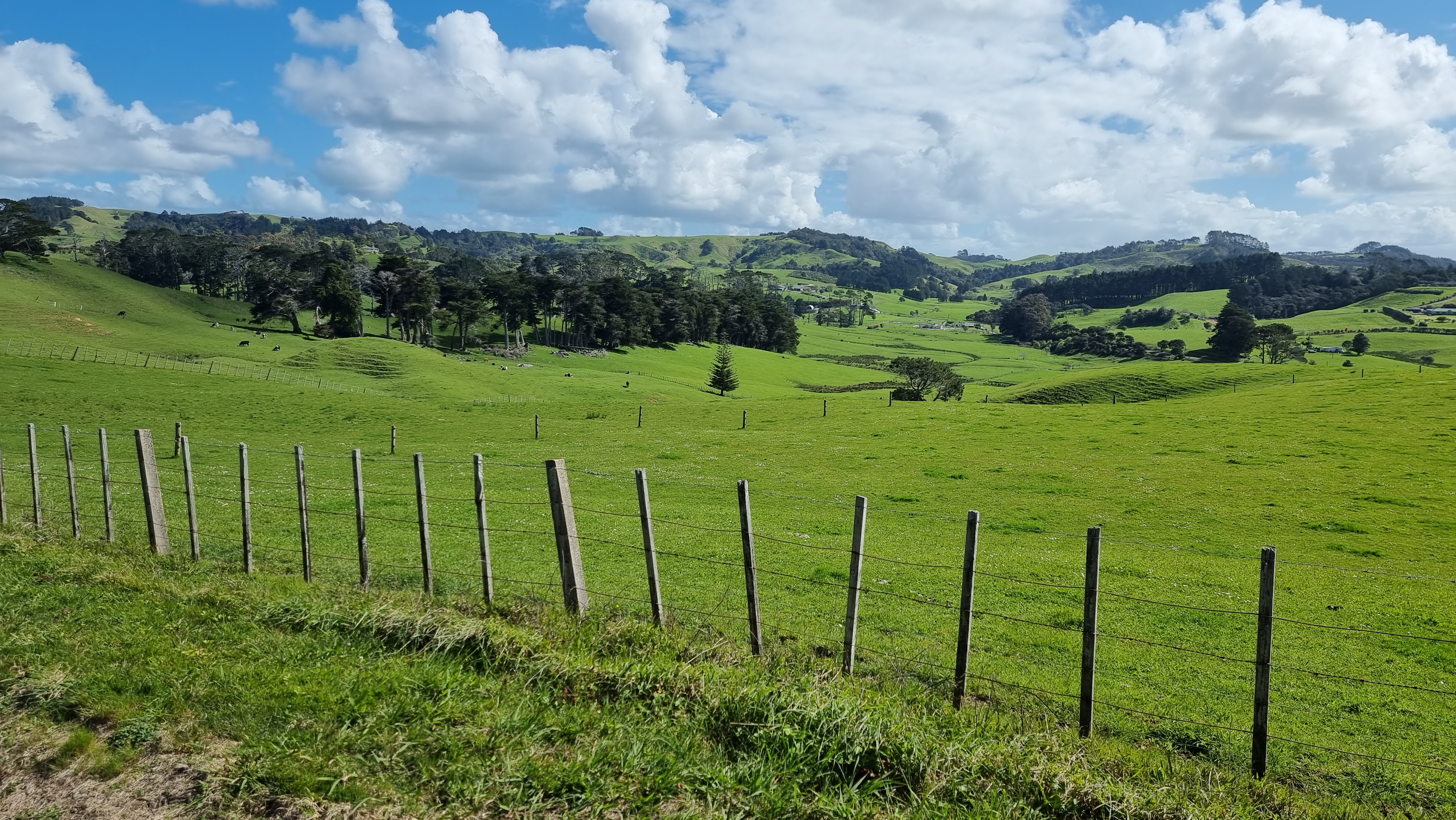
- Farmland near Taupaki
- Interactive map of Taupaki
- Coordinates: 36°49′14″S 174°33′01″E
- Country: New Zealand
- Region: Auckland
- Ward: Rodney ward
- Local board: Rodney Local Board
- Subdivision: Kumeū subdivision
- Electorates: Kaipara ki Mahurangi; Te Tai Tokerau

Government
  - Territorial Authority: Auckland Council
  - Mayor of Auckland: Wayne Brown
  - Whangaparāoa MP: Mark Mitchell
  - Te Tai Tokerau MP: Mariameno Kapa-Kingi

Area
  - Total: 25.73 km^{2} (9.93 sq mi)

Population (June 2025)
  - Total: 1,870
  - Density: 72.7/km^{2} (188/sq mi)

Taupaki is a locality in the Rodney District, which is a part of the Auckland Region in New Zealand. Kumeū lies to the north-west, Whenuapai to the north-east, West Harbour to the east, Massey to the south-east, Swanson to the south, and Waitākere, Auckland to the south-west. The North Auckland Line runs through the area.

== History ==
The area is traditionally a part of rohe of the tribe Te Kawerau ā Maki, who referred to the wider area was known as Te Kumeū. The name, meaning "the firmly bound peace", refers to a location on the coast near Muriwai, which became the border between Te Kawerau ā Maki and Ngāti Whātua lands in the early 18th century. The foothills to the west and south-west of the township were traditionally known as Ngā Rau Pou ā Maki, referring to the eponymous ancestor of Te Kawerau ā Maki.

During the 1870 and early 1880s, the main industries at Taupaki was kauri logging and kauri gum digging, especially after the North Auckland Line, which opened in 1881, made the area more accessible. As the land was cleared of forest and kauri gum, it was converted to pasture, and a farming community developed at Taupaki in the 1880s. While sheep farms were initially popular, by the 1890s dairy farms were becoming increasingly financially viable. During this period, Taupaki was largely settled by British and Australian immigrants, and people who moved from other areas of New Zealand.

Tauapaki School was opened in 1899, followed by the Taupaki Presbyterian Church in 1907. By 1936, 369 people were living at Taupaki and the rural surrounding area.

== Taupaki railway station ==
Taupaki station was part of the Waikomiti Branch, and opened on 18 July 1881. The station was closed for passengers on 31 July 1967, goods on 26 June 1960 and for all on 30 November 1980. In July 2025, over 1000 people signed a petition to return rail services to Kumeu Huapai, with potentially a station at Taupaki. After purchasing over 100ha of land around Taupaki, Fletchers Residential supports rail from Swanson to Kumeu, through Taupaki and Waitakere.

== Demographics ==
Taupaki statistical area covers 25.72 km^{2} (9.93 sq mi) and had an estimated population of 1,870 as of June 2025, with a population density of 73 people per km^{2}.

Historical population
Year	Pop.	±% p.a.
2006	1,452	—
2013	1,446	−0.06%
2018	1,551	+1.41%
2023	1,797	+2.99%
The 2006 population is for a larger area of 27.20 km^{2}. Source:

Taupaki had a population of 1,797 in the 2023 New Zealand census, an increase of 246 people (15.9%) since the 2018 census, and an increase of 351 people (24.3%) since the 2013 census. There were 891 males, 897 females and 9 people of other genders in 579 dwellings. 2.7% of people identified as LGBTIQ+. The median age was 43.5 years (compared with 38.1 years nationally). There were 270 people (15.0%) aged under 15 years, 357 (19.9%) aged 15 to 29, 837 (46.6%) aged 30 to 64, and 330 (18.4%) aged 65 or older.

People could identify as more than one ethnicity. The results were 86.5% European (Pākehā); 11.0% Māori; 3.5% Pasifika; 9.7% Asian; 0.7% Middle Eastern, Latin American and African New Zealanders (MELAA); and 3.5% other, which includes people giving their ethnicity as "New Zealander". English was spoken by 96.0%, Māori language by 1.5%, Samoan by 0.3%, and other languages by 10.9%. No language could be spoken by 2.0% (e.g. too young to talk). New Zealand Sign Language was known by 0.2%. The percentage of people born overseas was 22.4, compared with 28.8% nationally.

Religious affiliations were 24.7% Christian, 0.5% Hindu, 2.8% Islam, 0.5% Buddhist, 0.3% New Age, and 2.2% other religions. People who answered that they had no religion were 62.3%, and 6.5% of people did not answer the census question.

Of those at least 15 years old, 261 (17.1%) people had a bachelor's or higher degree, 846 (55.4%) had a post-high school certificate or diploma, and 345 (22.6%) people exclusively held high school qualifications. The median income was $46,100, compared with $41,500 nationally. 240 people (15.7%) earned over $100,000 compared to 12.1% nationally. The employment status of those at least 15 was that 810 (53.0%) people were employed full-time, 222 (14.5%) were part-time, and 36 (2.4%) were unemployed.

== Education ==
Taupaki School is a coeducational full primary (years 1–8) school with a decile rating of 9 and a roll of 238 (July 2026). The school was established in 1899, and celebrated its centenary in 1999.

== Notable people ==
- Barry Crump, author. Crump spent much of his childhood in Taupaki.

== Bibliography ==
- Dunsford, Deborah (2002). Doing It Themselves: the Story of Kumeu, Huapai and Taupaki. Huapai-Kumeu Lions Club. ISBN 0-473-08969-6.
