= Kumeu–Riverhead section =

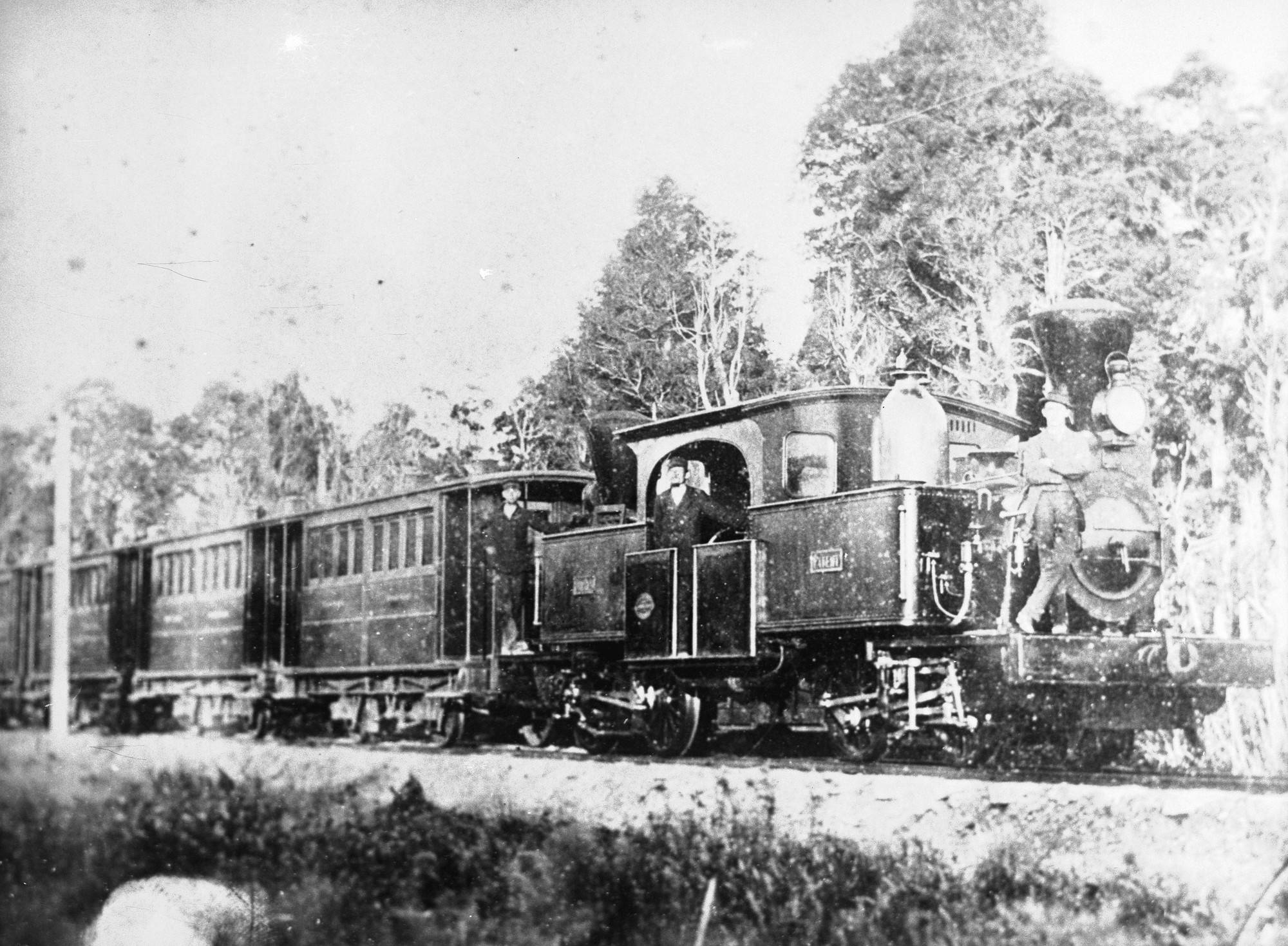
An NZR E class (1872) train on the railway in 1876

The Kumeu-Riverhead section was a short-lived railway line north-west of Auckland, New Zealand. It was built as part of the Kaipara-Riverhead Railway, which was isolated from the national railway network until 1881, just before closure of this section.

== Construction ==
Map

The Kaipara-Riverhead Railway was built to link the eastern Waitematā Harbour at Riverhead with the western Kaipara Harbour at Helensville South, to provide more convenient access between the northern districts and Auckland and to improve export prospects for the timber industry in the Kaipara area. The first sod was turned on 31 August 1871 by the Auckland Provincial Council, but at the start of 1872 the national government took over the job. The railway was only 25 km long, and specific delays with acquiring rails and the general difficulties associated with the relative isolation of the time meant that construction dragged on for a few years. On 29 October 1875, it finally opened.

== Brief operation and closure ==
The section had no intermediate stations, and operated for slightly less than six years. Construction of the North Auckland Line was proceeding steadily, and on 13 July 1881 it reached Kumeū from Auckland. The Kumeu-Riverhead section became the Riverhead branch, with Kumeū as a junction, but it did not last even a week. Between Kumeū and Auckland the North Auckland Line was far superior to shipping, so the Riverhead branch closed on 18 July 1881. The tracks and sleepers were later uplifted and used elsewhere.

== Today ==
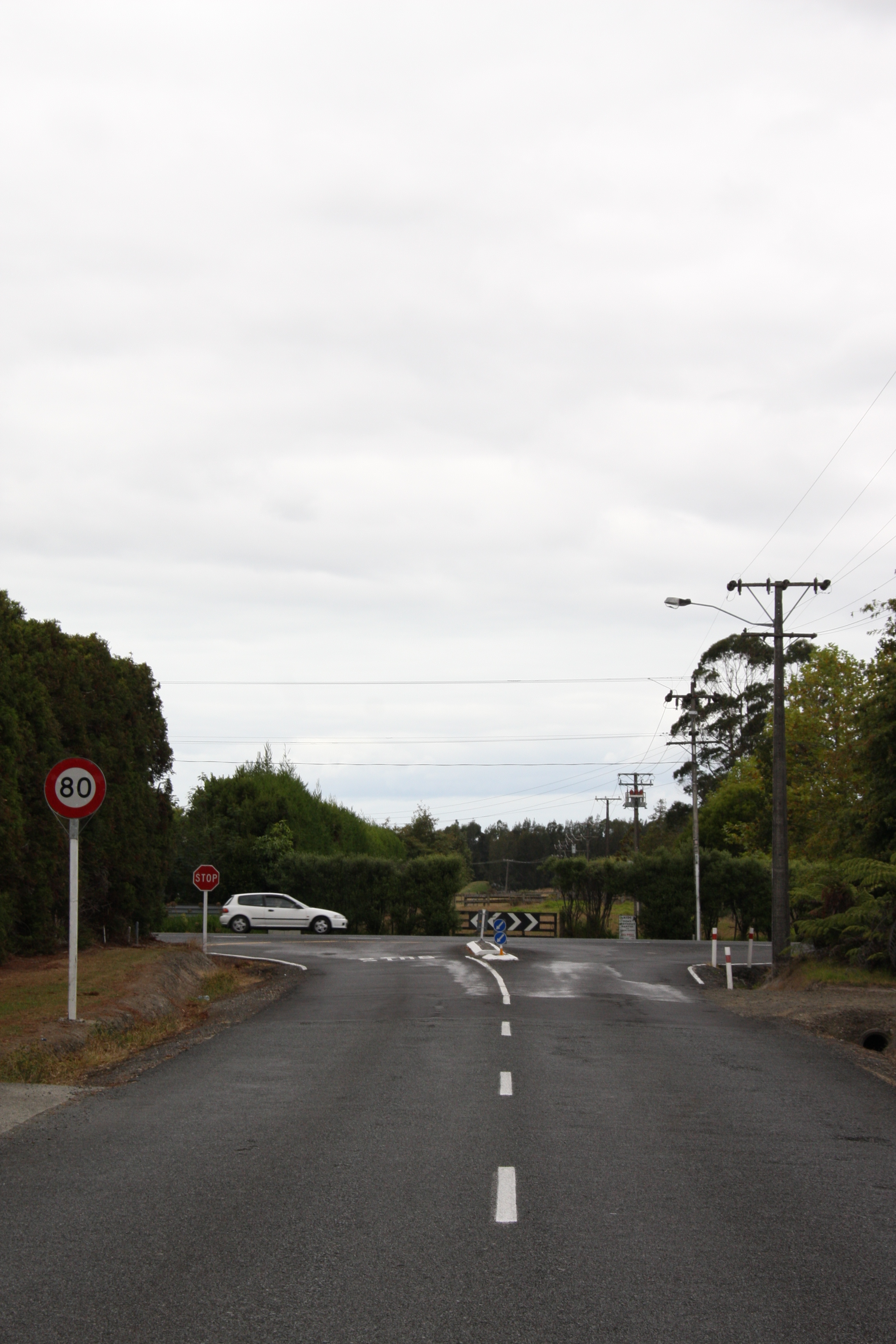
Old Railway Road in Kumeū is on the former railway alignment. This photo shows the eastern end of the road; the railway line continued straight ahead across Coatesville Riverhead Highway.

Despite the line being closed for nearly a century and a half, some faint remnants still exist. The embankment on which it left Kumeū diverges from the North Auckland Line near the Kumeu River Number 1 bridge. Old Railway Road is on the formation of the line, and at the T-intersection with the Coatesville Riverhead Highway (formerly State Highway 18) the road ends and the formation continues straight ahead. At Riverhead no substantial relics remain.

== See also ==
- North Island Main Trunk Line
- North Auckland Line
- Newmarket Line
- Manukau Branch
- Onehunga Branch
- Waiuku/Mission Bush Branch
