= Kaipara River =

River in the Auckland Region, New Zealand

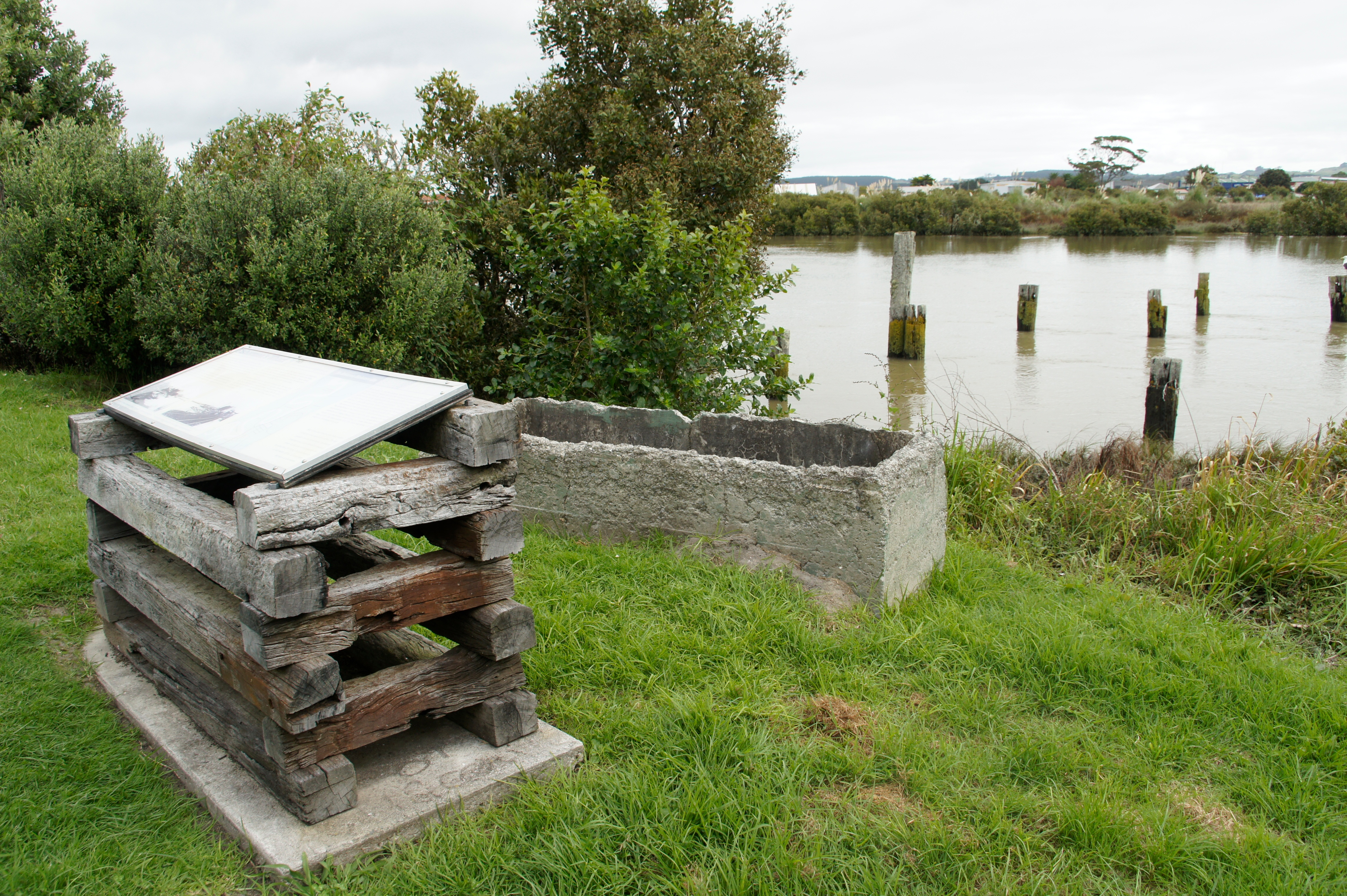
- The Kaipara River as it runs through Helensville

- Mouth of the Kaipara River Kaipara River (New Zealand)
- Route of the Kaipara River

Location
- Country: New Zealand
- Region: Auckland Region

Physical characteristics
- Source: Confluence of the Ahukuramu Stream and Kumeū River
  - coordinates: 36.75906°S 174.5085°E
- Mouth: Kaipara Harbour
  - coordinates: 36.6175°S 174.42°E

Basin features
- Progression: Kaipara River → Kaipara Harbour → Tasman Sea
- Tributaries
  - left: Waimauku Stream, Waipatukahu Stream, Te Moau Stream, Te Wahanui Stream, Te Karaka Stream
  - right: Wharauroa Stream, Mangakura Stream, Awaroa Stream, Pipitiwai Creek, Kaukapakapa River
- Bridges: Helensville Bridge

The Kaipara River drains the area to the northwest of Auckland, New Zealand. It flows north from the northern foothills of the Waitākere Ranges, meandering past the town of Helensville. It is joined by the Kaukapakapa River in its lower tidal reaches shortly before entering the southern Kaipara Harbour. Other major tributaries are the Ararimu, Ahukuramu, Waimauku and Waipatukahu streams.

== Description ==
The lower Kaipara River winds through swampland and farmland. The river water is brown, as it is rich in sediments washed in from the soft Miocene to Quaternary sediments within its catchment.

== History ==
The area around the river was historically occupied by the Te Taoū hapū of Ngāti Whātua in the lower catchment near present-day Helensville, and by Te Kawerau ā Maki in the upper sections near Kumeū.

During European settlement in the late 19th century, the course of the river was altered to better use the river to float timber for milling at Helensville.
