= J. T. Diamond =

New Zealand historian and archaeologist (1912–2001)

J. T. Diamond MBE
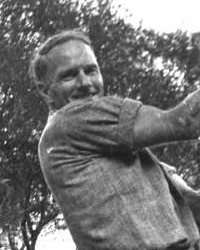
- Diamond in 1954
- Born: John Thomas Diamond; 21 June 1912
- Died: 20 February 2001 (aged 88)
- Other name: Jack Diamond
- Known for: Historian, archaeologist
- Spouse: Eunice Melville Smith (m. 1936)

John Thomas Diamond MBE (21 June 1912 – 20 February 2001) was an amateur New Zealand historian and archaeologist. Over 70 years, Diamond documented the industrial, archaeological and social history of West Auckland.

== Life and work ==
Diamond became interested in history after finding Māori artifacts on a farm near Warkworth where he was working.

Diamond was an avid explorer of the Waitākere Ranges, recording and reporting on historic sites for the Auckland Regional Authority, the University of Auckland and Waitematā City Council. He published many books and papers about the history and stories of West Auckland. In 1975, he was asked by the Auckland Regional Authority and Lands and Survey Department to suggest names for unnamed streams and features of West Auckland. The 250 new names he suggested were all accepted and included on maps.

He was a founding member of the West Auckland Historical Society and an honorary life member of the Auckland regional committee of the New Zealand Historic Places Trust.

== Honours and awards ==
In the 1986 Queen's Birthday Honours, Diamond was appointed a Member of the Order of the British Empire, for services to archaeology. In December 1999, he received a Waitakere City Council Millennium Medal for his services to the community and heritage of the west.

== Legacy ==
Diamond left his collection of papers, research notes, photographs and slides to Waitakere Libraries. These now form the J. T. Diamond West Auckland History Collection which were added to the UNESCO New Zealand Memory of the World Aotearoa New Zealand Ngā Mahara o te Ao register in 2017.

== Selected works ==
- Diamond, John T. (1953), Once the wilderness
- Diamond, John T. (1955), The Maori in the Waitakere Ranges
- Diamond, John T.; Hayward, Bruce W. (1978), Historic archaeological sites of the Waitakere Ranges, West Auckland, New Zealand
- Diamond, John T.; Hayward, Bruce W. (1980), Waitakere kauri : a pictorial history of the kauri timber industry in the Waitakere Ranges, west Auckland
