= Albertland =

Albertland was a Non-Conformist settlement scheme situated around the Kaipara Harbour on the North Island of New Zealand. Organised around the bicentennial of the Great Ejection the scheme was intended to be a Utopian settlement for pious Non-Conformists. The scheme was not very successful and many settlers abandoned it due to harsh conditions however multiple settlements were established around the Kaipara Harbour by the Albertlanders that still exist to this day.

Map of the Kaipara Harbour with Albertland settlements highlighted (Wellsford not shown)

== Immigration plans ==
In 1861 William Rawson Brame, a Birmingham Baptist minister, founded the Albertland Special Settlement Association, organising non-conformist immigrants to come to New Zealand as part of the last organised British settlement in New Zealand. They included farmers, carpenters, servants, butchers, joiners, cabinetmakers, millers, drapers, sawyers, clerks and many other trades. The scheme was organised for 1862 the bicentennial of the Great Ejection. The name was chosen due to the recent death of Prince Albert.

After surveying the majority of the Okahukura Peninsula the explorers gained information from residents who lived on the Oruawharo River and decided to create the Albertland settlement a few kilometres up where there was good scrubland and bush with kauri for building, using an Auckland Provincial Council scheme which "...provided 40 acres [16 hectares] each for a man and his wife, and 20 acres [8 ha] for each child between five and 18 years old – provided they paid their own fare and stayed on the land for five years, built a house, and began farming...".

Between 1862 and 1865 some 3,000 Non-Conformist settlers, primarily from the Midlands came to New Zealand. The promises of a classless society enticed many settlers; however, the reality of the conditions faced in this remote area and inexperience of many of the settlers led to most abandoning the Albertland settlement, with most immigrating to the city of Auckland.

The main settlement was at Port Albert; however, other settlements along the Kaipara Harbour were established: Other settlements established include Minniesdale at Wharehine, Pahi and Paparoa, Maungaturoto, Matakohe, Wellsford, and Tapora. The Albertlanders left an influence on these settlements, with many of these settlements having separate congregations for Congregationalists, Baptists, and the Church of Christ where as in other rural settlements these congregations were merged.

== See also ==
- Edwin Stanley Brookes, Jnr.
- Matakohe
- Paparoa
- Tapora
- Wellsford
