= Ātiu Creek Regional Park =

Regional park in New Zealand

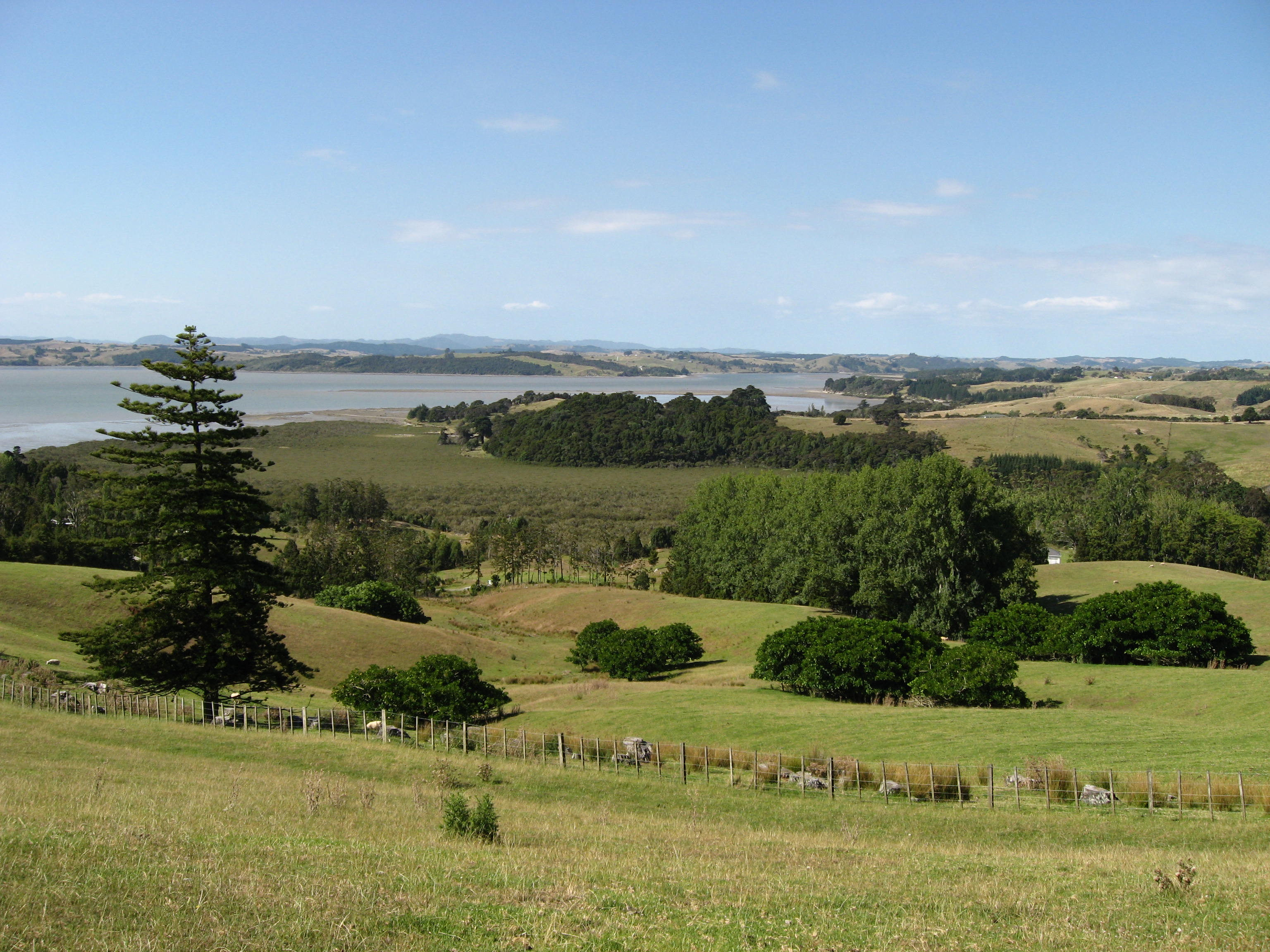
- Ātiu Creek Regional Park in 2009

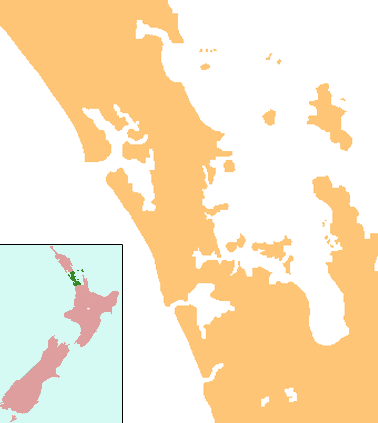
- Location within New Zealand Auckland
- Location: Rodney, Auckland, New Zealand
- Coordinates: 36.3306711°S 174.3643446°E
- Area: 843 ha (2,080 acres)
- Operator: Auckland Council

Ātiu Creek Regional Park is a regional park located south of the Ōruawharo River on the eastern shores of the Kaipara Harbour, in the North Island of New Zealand. It is located west of Wellsford and east of Tāpora on the Okahukura Peninsula, in Rodney in the Auckland Region and is managed by Auckland Council.

== Environment ==
The park is primarily farmland, on the Okahukura Peninsula adjacent to the Oruawharo River, on the eastern shores of the Kaipara Harbour, approximately 20 kilometres (12 mi) west of the town of Wellsford. The Ātiu Creek, the namesake of the park, flows into the Oruawharo River in the park.

The park is a mix of pastureland, exotic forest, wetlands, estuarial mangroves, and small areas of remnant native forest. Approximately a third of the park consists of regenerating native forest.

== History ==
The park, alongside the other areas of the Okahukura Peninsula, have had a long history of occupation by Tāmaki Māori. In addition to the numerous archaeological sites found in the park, the eastern edge of the park was the location of the Opou portage, an important link between the Oruawharo and the Tauhoa rivers, two estuarial arms of the Kaipara Harbour. At the Opou portage, waka could be hauled a short distance between the two water bodies. The mana whenua of the area are Te Uri-o-Hau, a tribe of the Ngāti Whātua people. Members of Te Uri-o-Hau have erected a number of carved pou at the regional park. Archaeological sites relating to Te Uri-o-Hau in the regional park include Ōporo and Whakahurunga pā sites, nohanga (temporary seasonal settlements related to food gathering) and urupā.

During the colonial era of New Zealand, the park was forested. Most of the trees were milled for timber, and after World War I, the land was subdivided into farm blocks.

The park was gifted to the Auckland Regional Council by Pierre and Jackie Chatelanat in 2006, whose family had first acquired the land in 1951. This was the largest block of land gifted to the people of Auckland since John Logan Campbell gifted Cornwall Park in 1901 although Cornwall park is in Trust and not owned by Auckland Council. It was officially opened as a regional park two years later in April 2008. Since opening, the regional park has continued to be run as a working sheep and cattle farm. There are around 80 Hereford breeding cows in the park.

Approximately 13,000 people visited the park in 2015, which increased to 45,000 annual visitors in 2020.

== Recreation ==
The park is a popular location for walking, mountain biking and horse riding. The park is also the location of campgrounds, and has been used an events space for multi-day festivals.
