= Kaiwakawaka River =

River in the Auckland Region, New Zealand

- Mouth of the Kaiwakawaka River Kaiwakawaka River (New Zealand)
- Route of the Kaiwakawaka River

Location
- Country: New Zealand
- Region: Auckland Region

Physical characteristics
- Source
  - coordinates: 36.3163°S 174.4856°E
- Mouth: Wharehine River
  - coordinates: 36.2931°S 174.4365°E

Basin features
- Progression: Wharehine River → Oruawharo River → Kaipara Harbour → Tasman Sea

The Kaiwakawaka River is a river of New Zealand. Located west of Wellsford, it is a tributary of the Wharehine River.

== See also ==
- List of rivers of New Zealand
