= Pahi, New Zealand =

Pahi
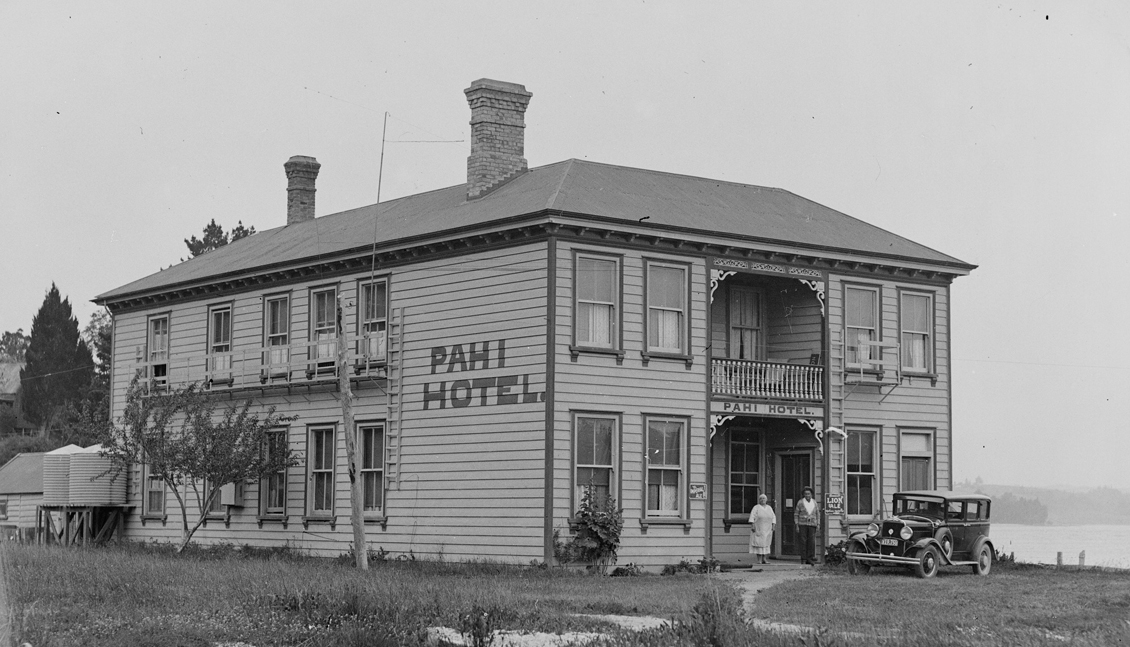
- Pahi Hotel circa 1940
- Interactive map of Pahi
- Coordinates: 36°9′25″S 174°13′40″E
- Country: New Zealand
- Region: Northland Region
- District: Kaipara District
- Ward: Otamatea Ward
- Electorates: Northland; Te Tai Tokerau

Government
  - Territorial Authority: Kaipara District Council
  - Regional council: Northland Regional Council
  - Mayor of Kaipara: Jonathan Larsen
  - Northland MP: Grant McCallum
  - Te Tai Tokerau MP: Mariameno Kapa-Kingi

Area
  - Total: 5.62 km^{2} (2.17 sq mi)

Population (June 2025)
  - Total: 290
  - Density: 52/km^{2} (130/sq mi)

Pahi is a settlement in Northland, New Zealand. It is at the end of a peninsula in the Kaipara Harbour, bounded by inlets to the Paparoa Creek to the west and the Pahi River to the east. Paparoa is 6 km to the north, and Matakohe is 4 km to the north-west.

Pahi was one of several Kaipara settlements established by a religious group known as Albertlanders. Port Albert near Wellsford was the main settlement, and Matakohe was another. After the Paparoa Block was settled in 1863, a road was constructed to the port at Pahi in 1865.

The steamer Minnie Casey ran a weekly service from Pahi to Helensville on the south side of the Kaipara from 1882, and the S.S. Ethel took over from 1891 to 1895, after which services went only to Matakohe and Pahi.

Pahi is best known for its annual regatta; the Pahi Regatta Club was established in 1887, and a regatta has been held every year except 1925. Taking place over three days, events included sailing and later motorboat races, children's sports, foot races, aquatic events, rowing, and horse-swimming races across the 0.5 miles (800 m) strait to Whakapirau and back. Horse-swimming races ceased after a horse and rider drowned.

The Pahi Reserve and Campground contains a Moreton Bay fig tree (Ficus macrophylla) with a girth of over 14 metres (46 ft), one of the largest specimens of this species in the world, and considered "one of the ten finest exotic [trees] in New Zealand."

== Demographics ==
Statistics New Zealand describes Pahi as a rural settlement, which covers 5.62 km^{2} (2.17 sq mi) and had an estimated population of 290 as of June 2025, with a population density of 52 people per km^{2}. Pahi is part of the larger Otamatea statistical area.

Historical population
Year	Pop.	±% p.a.
2006	198	—
2013	180	−1.35%
2018	255	+7.21%
2023	294	+2.89%

Pahi had a population of 294 in the 2023 New Zealand census, an increase of 39 people (15.3%) since the 2018 census, and an increase of 114 people (63.3%) since the 2013 census. There were 147 males and 147 females in 132 dwellings. 2.0% of people identified as LGBTIQ+. The median age was 57.1 years (compared with 38.1 years nationally). There were 39 people (13.3%) aged under 15 years, 27 (9.2%) aged 15 to 29, 120 (40.8%) aged 30 to 64, and 108 (36.7%) aged 65 or older.

People could identify as more than one ethnicity. The results were 91.8% European (Pākehā), 21.4% Māori, 3.1% Pasifika, 1.0% Asian, and 8.2% other, which includes people giving their ethnicity as "New Zealander". English was spoken by 99.0%, Māori language by 4.1%, and other languages by 5.1%. No language could be spoken by 1.0% (e.g. too young to talk). The percentage of people born overseas was 13.3, compared with 28.8% nationally.

Religious affiliations were 40.8% Christian, 1.0% Buddhist, 2.0% New Age, and 1.0% other religions. People who answered that they had no religion were 49.0%, and 8.2% of people did not answer the census question.

Of those at least 15 years old, 36 (14.1%) people had a bachelor's or higher degree, 126 (49.4%) had a post-high school certificate or diploma, and 84 (32.9%) people exclusively held high school qualifications. The median income was $27,600, compared with $41,500 nationally. 9 people (3.5%) earned over $100,000 compared to 12.1% nationally. The employment status of those at least 15 was that 90 (35.3%) people were employed full-time, 42 (16.5%) were part-time, and 3 (1.2%) were unemployed.

== Gallery ==
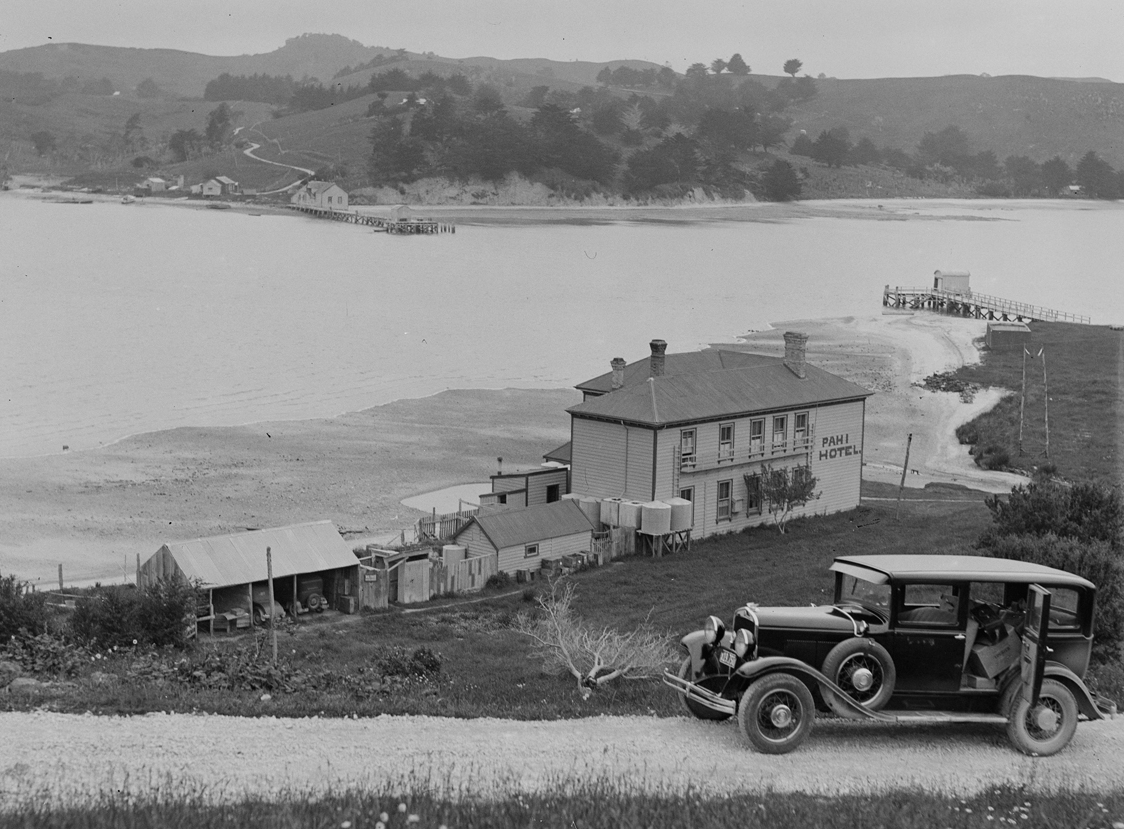
View of Pahi and the Kaipara Harbour coastline circa 1940

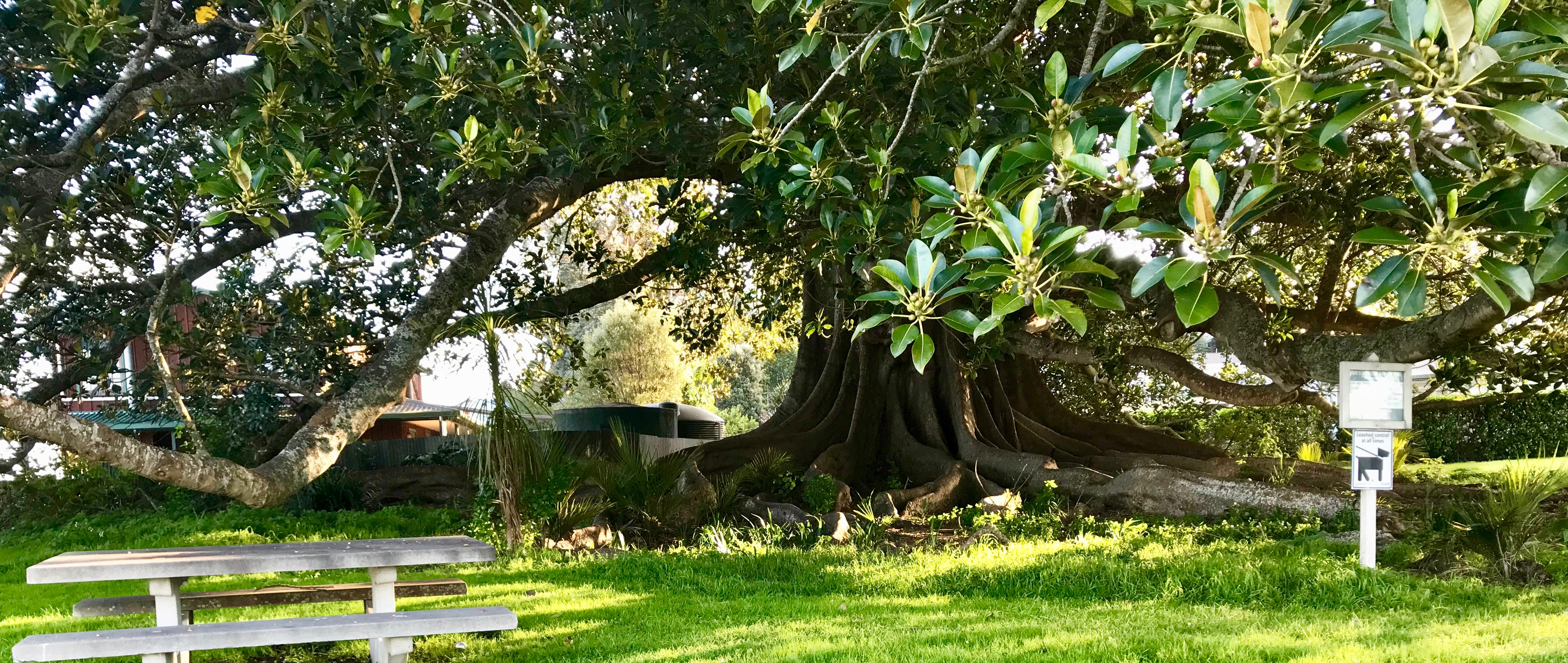
The Moreton Bay fig at Pahi Reserve

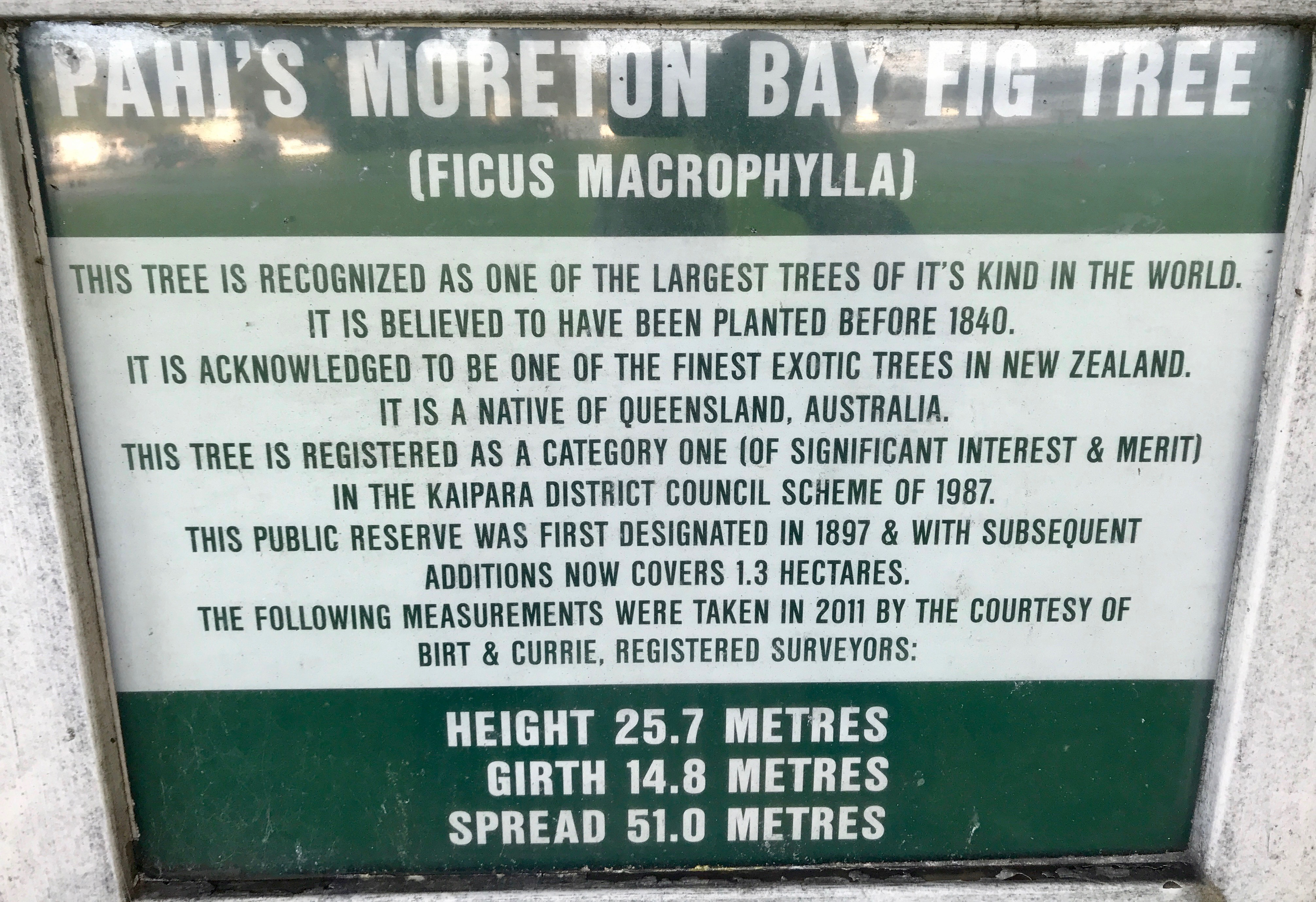
Signboard in front of the Pahi Moreton Bay fig
