= Waireia River =

River in the Auckland Region, New Zealand

- Mouth of the Waireia River Waireia River (New Zealand)
- Route of the Waireia River

Location
- Country: New Zealand
- Region: Auckland Region

Physical characteristics
- Source
  - coordinates: 36.3314°S 174.4207°E
- Mouth: Wharehine River
  - coordinates: 36.2974°S 174.432°E
- Length: 8 km (5 mi)

Basin features
- Progression: Waireia River → Wharehine River → Oruawharo River → Kaipara Harbour → Tasman Sea

The Waireia River is a river of the Auckland Region of New Zealand's North Island. Part of the Kaipara Harbour system, it flows north to meet the Oruawharo River 10 kilometres (6 mi) west of Wellsford.

== See also ==
- List of rivers of New Zealand
