= Tāpora =

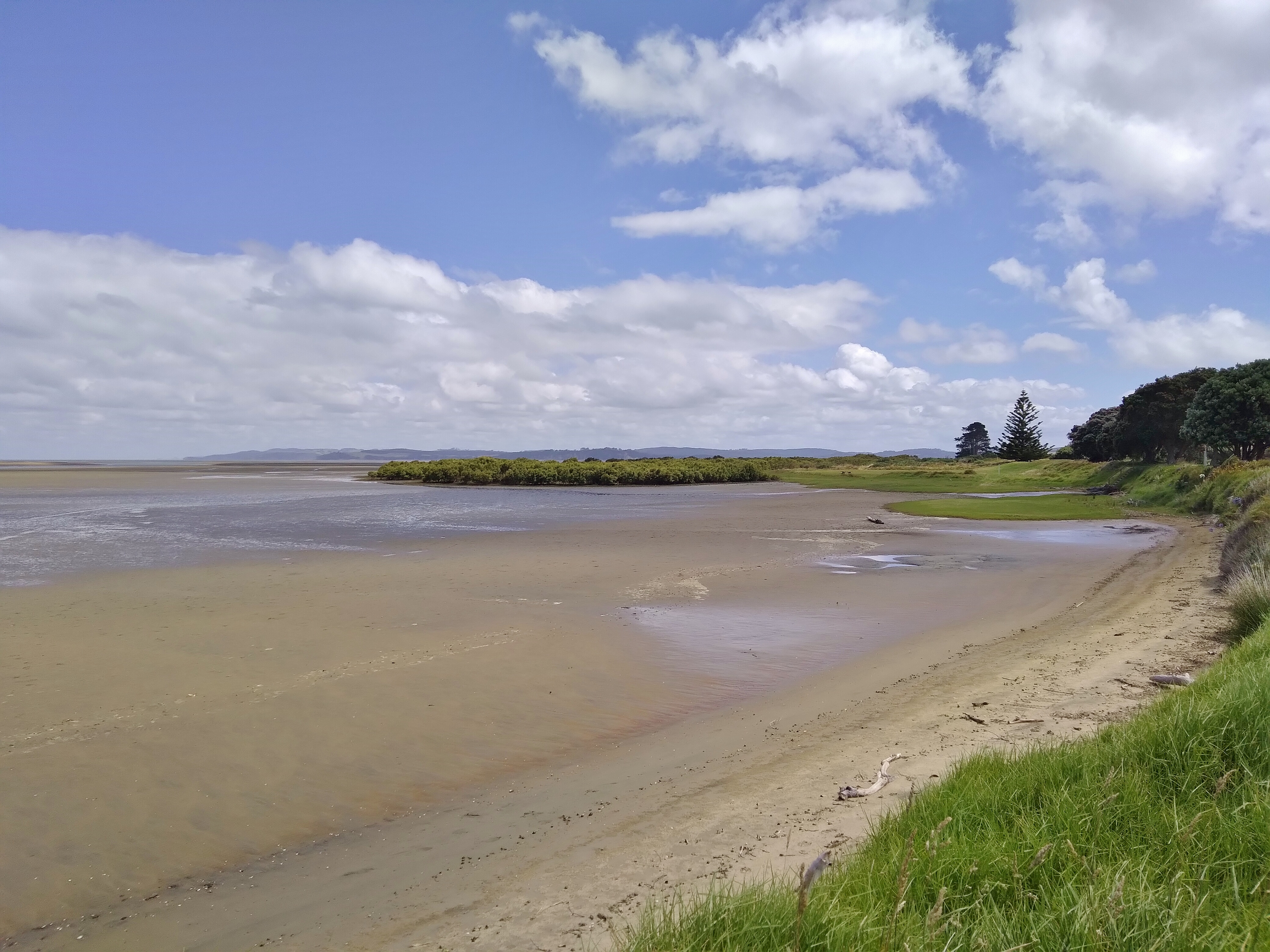
- Bird's Beach, Tapora, New Zealand at low tide
- Interactive map of Tāpora
- Coordinates: 36°21′03″S 174°18′9″E
- Country: New Zealand
- Region: Auckland Region
- Ward: Rodney ward
- Community board: Rodney Local Board
- Subdivision: Wellsford subdivision
- Electorates: Kaipara ki Mahurangi; Te Tai Tokerau

Government
  - Territorial Authority: Auckland Council
  - Mayor of Auckland: Wayne Brown
  - Kaipara ki Mahurangi MP: Chris Penk
  - Te Tai Tokerau MP: Mariameno Kapa-Kingi

Tāpora is a locality on the Okahukura Peninsula, which is on the eastern side of the Kaipara Harbour in New Zealand. It is part of the Rodney District. Wellsford lies to the East, as does Port Albert and the Wharehine River, while Manukapua Island lies to the West.

== Early history ==
Early history of Māori tells how the western shores of Okahukura once extended to the entrance of the Kaipara Harbour as sand dunes with two channels into the harbour instead of one, as it is now. This portion of land that was more or less sand dunes was known as Tāpora, and was inhabited by Māori. Great storms gradually caused the sand dunes to drift away, allowing the sea to encroach, leaving only sand bars in the harbour where there was once a whare or meeting house on the original sand dunes.

The name Tāpora was given by the crew of the Māhuhu-ki-te-rangi migratory waka, who named the area after a place in their Polynesian homeland. The name Okahukura refers to Kahukura, one of the rangatira who arrived to Aotearoa New Zealand aboard the Tākitimu migratory waka.

For ten generations the land of Okahukura remained in the possession of Ngāti Whātua. For more than ten years after the Government had purchased the neighbouring land known as Albertland, the peninsula was occupied by the Ngāti Whātua tribe.

About the year 1876 T. E. FitzGerald purchased the land from Ngāti Whātua which included the Okahukura point and 24,000 acres (97 km^{2}) of land. FitzGerald built his first homestead around 1880 on a ridge overlooking Ōruawharo River. Here he built a jetty for small boats for access when there was sufficient high tide, but there was a main landing point in deeper water for any tide. Due to the large number of kauri trees, FitzGerald leased the rights of this land to gum-diggers. Due to old age FitzGerald had to retire and terminate his twenty years of occupancy at Okahukura.

Following FitzGerald's retirement A. H. Walker leased this land for two and a half years and dramatically changed the landscape by re-fencing and sowing grass. T.C. Williams now leased the land with W. Williams taking over management. For the next ten years Williams and his workers spent many days cutting and burning down bush to allow for sowing grasslands, while opening gumfields and a store at one of FitzGerald's old homes. In the year 1910 Williams was in the process of transferring the management of the block to C. Kemp, when he accidentally fatally shot himself. Kemp took over management of Okahukura, continuing with the development of boundary fences. Nearer the end of 1910 Okahukura was sold to Messrs Bowron and Smith of Christchurch. Kemp was still manager of the Okahukura property and split the property up, selling sections to others and developed roads for access into the new sections as well as communications through a telephone line. The land changed ownership numerous times between World War One and World War Two.

== Recent history ==
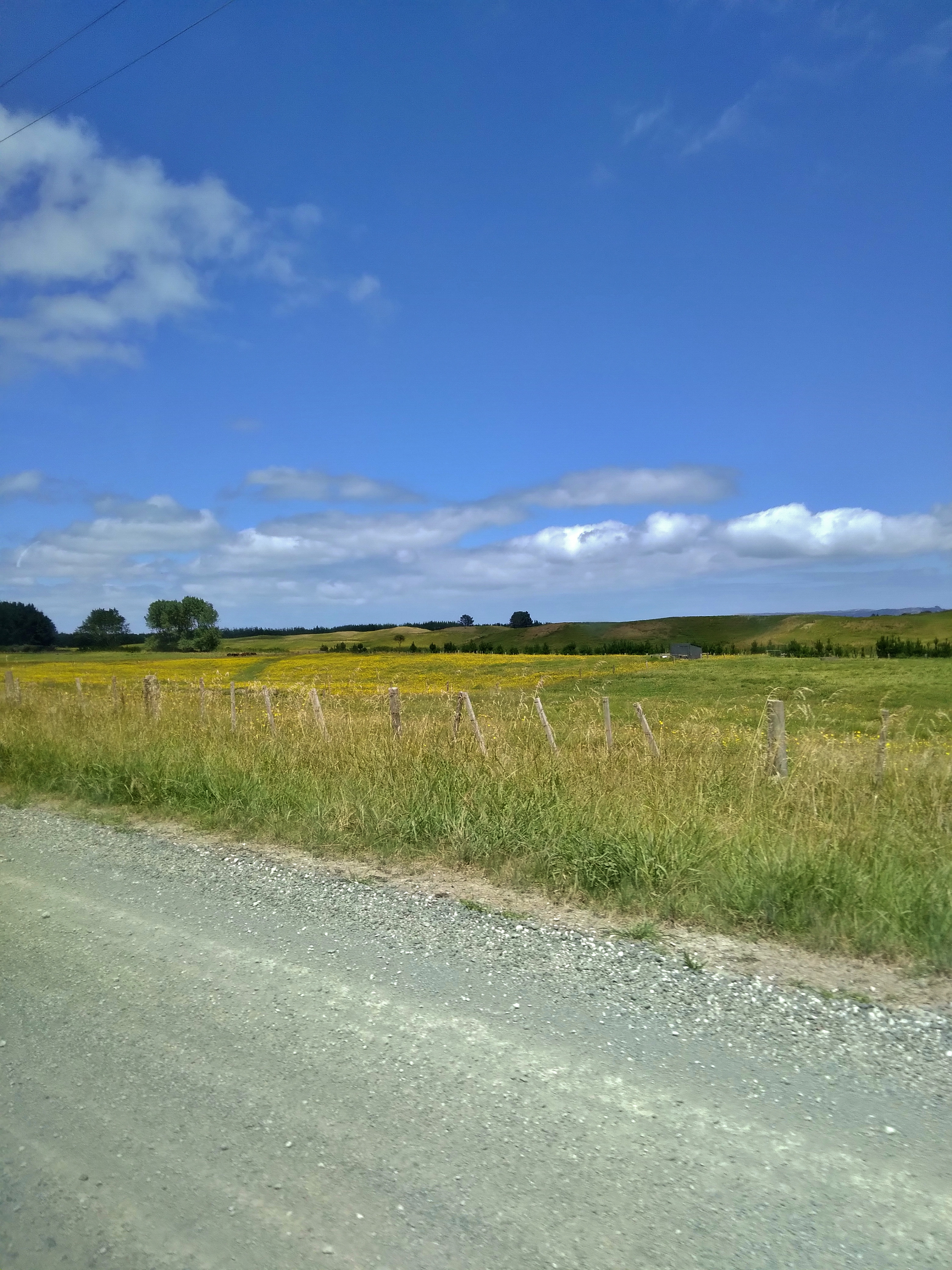
Farm scene from Okahukura Road, Tāpora

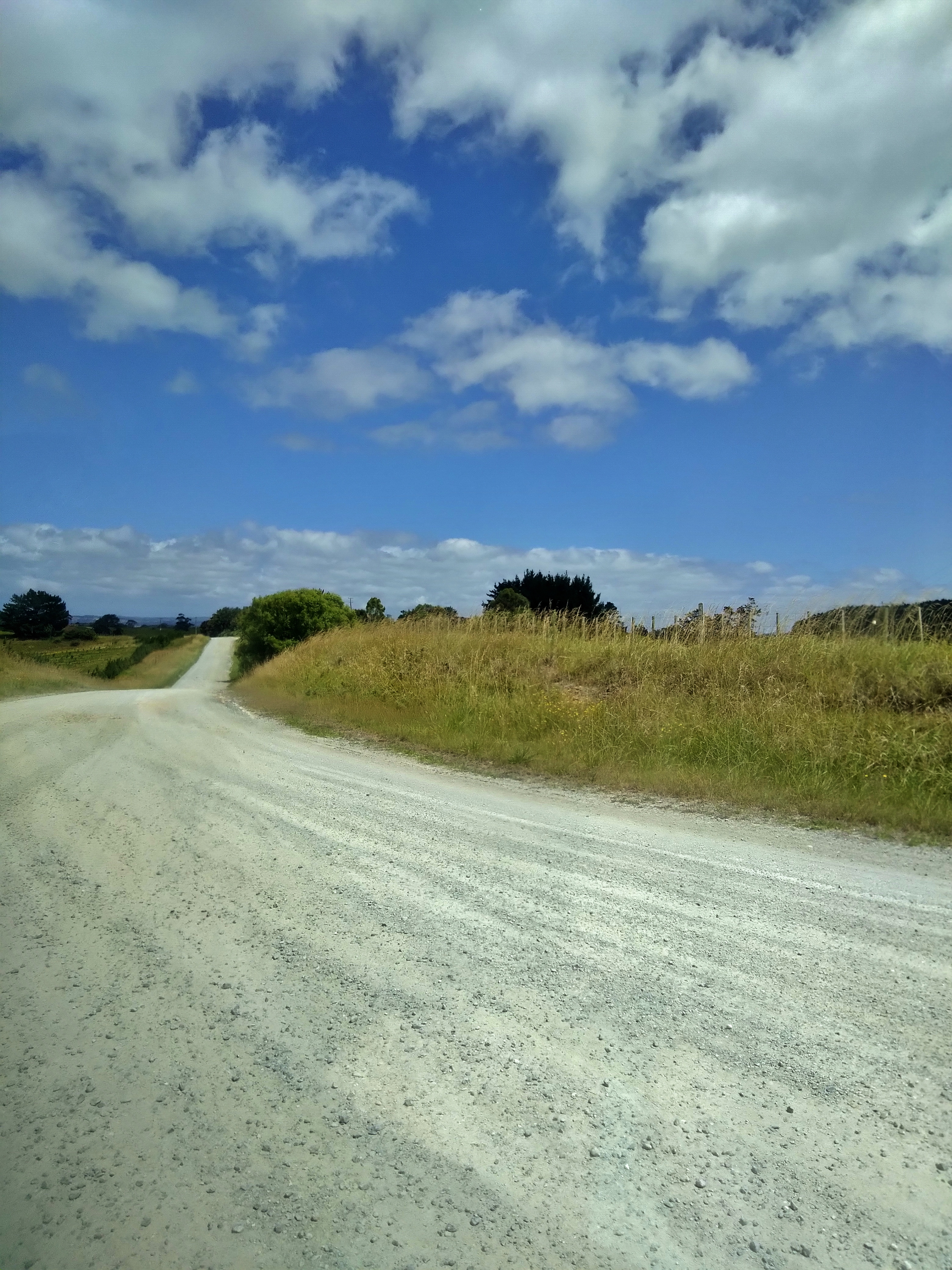
Okahukura Road near the Junction with Journey's End, Tāpora

During World War II, the United States Marines established a camp at “the run” (Sea View) and used the surrounding area for target practice. In April 1945, the New Zealand Government took over Okahukura to establish a soldier rehabilitation settlement. The name Okahukura was later changed to Tāpora to avoid confusion with another locality of the same name elsewhere in New Zealand.

The Minister of 'Land and Returned Services' Association brokered a pact to develop the Okahukura peninsula for returned servicemen through ballots. A community to be called Tapora was planned with a shop, school, church and workers' houses (only the school and a few houses were constructed). The ballots for the Returned Services' Association were created in 1947 and Tāpora turned into a dairy farming settlement.

In 2006 Pierre and Jackie Chatelanat gifted Atiu Creek Regional Park to the Auckland Regional Council.

In 2013 a substantial fire which began near Okahukura Road burned through 85ha of land at Tāpora, much of it wild pines, Gorse, Pampas Grass and coastal scrub/conservation land.

Many of the dairy farms in Tāpora were converted to orchards, with tens of thousands of avocado trees planted from the mid 2010s.

== Demographics ==
Tāpora is in an SA1 statistical area which also includes Birds Beach and covers 42.71 km^{2} (16.49 sq mi). The SA1 area is part of the larger Okahukura Peninsula statistical area.

Historical population for Tāpora and surrounds
Year	Pop.	±% p.a.
2006	117	—
2013	114	−0.37%
2018	123	+1.53%
2023	99	−4.25%

The SA1 statistical area had a population of 99 in the 2023 New Zealand census, a decrease of 24 people (−19.5%) since the 2018 census, and a decrease of 15 people (−13.2%) since the 2013 census. There were 57 males and 42 females in 39 dwellings. 3.0% of people identified as LGBTIQ+. The median age was 43.7 years (compared with 38.1 years nationally). There were 18 people (18.2%) aged under 15 years, 15 (15.2%) aged 15 to 29, 54 (54.5%) aged 30 to 64, and 18 (18.2%) aged 65 or older.

People could identify as more than one ethnicity. The results were 87.9% European (Pākehā), 30.3% Māori, 3.0% Pasifika, and 6.1% Asian. English was spoken by 100.0%, Māori language by 6.1%, and other languages by 6.1%. No language could be spoken by 3.0% (e.g. too young to talk). The percentage of people born overseas was 12.1, compared with 28.8% nationally.

Religious affiliations were 18.2% Christian, and 3.0% Buddhist. People who answered that they had no religion were 69.7%, and 9.1% of people did not answer the census question.

Of those at least 15 years old, 12 (14.8%) people had a bachelor's or higher degree, 48 (59.3%) had a post-high school certificate or diploma, and 21 (25.9%) people exclusively held high school qualifications. The median income was $33,700, compared with $41,500 nationally. 9 people (11.1%) earned over $100,000 compared to 12.1% nationally. The employment status of those at least 15 was that 51 (63.0%) people were employed full-time and 9 (11.1%) were part-time.

=== Okahukura Peninsula ===
Okahukura Peninsula statistical area, which also includes Port Albert and Te Hana, covers 211.06 km^{2} (81.49 sq mi) and had an estimated population of 1,610 as of June 2025, with a population density of 7.6 people per km^{2}.

Historical population for Okahukura Peninsula
Year	Pop.	±% p.a.
2006	1,380	—
2013	1,326	−0.57%
2018	1,446	+1.75%
2023	1,563	+1.57%
The 2006 population is for a larger area of 211.18 km^{2}. Source:

Okahukura Peninsula had a population of 1,563 in the 2023 New Zealand census, an increase of 117 people (8.1%) since the 2018 census, and an increase of 237 people (17.9%) since the 2013 census. There were 804 males, 753 females and 6 people of other genders in 555 dwellings. 2.5% of people identified as LGBTIQ+. The median age was 42.9 years (compared with 38.1 years nationally). There were 324 people (20.7%) aged under 15 years, 225 (14.4%) aged 15 to 29, 741 (47.4%) aged 30 to 64, and 276 (17.7%) aged 65 or older.

People could identify as more than one ethnicity. The results were 87.5% European (Pākehā); 23.6% Māori; 4.0% Pasifika; 2.7% Asian; 0.2% Middle Eastern, Latin American and African New Zealanders (MELAA); and 2.3% other, which includes people giving their ethnicity as "New Zealander". English was spoken by 97.9%, Māori language by 4.2%, and other languages by 5.8%. No language could be spoken by 1.5% (e.g. too young to talk). New Zealand Sign Language was known by 0.2%. The percentage of people born overseas was 15.2, compared with 28.8% nationally.

Religious affiliations were 29.6% Christian, 0.2% Hindu, 0.2% Islam, 1.2% Māori religious beliefs, 0.4% Buddhist, 0.2% New Age, and 1.2% other religions. People who answered that they had no religion were 57.4%, and 10.2% of people did not answer the census question.

Of those at least 15 years old, 144 (11.6%) people had a bachelor's or higher degree, 741 (59.8%) had a post-high school certificate or diploma, and 321 (25.9%) people exclusively held high school qualifications. The median income was $37,600, compared with $41,500 nationally. 102 people (8.2%) earned over $100,000 compared to 12.1% nationally. The employment status of those at least 15 was that 639 (51.6%) people were employed full-time, 198 (16.0%) were part-time, and 30 (2.4%) were unemployed.

== Notable Sites ==
- Atiu Creek Regional Park
- Bird's Beach
- Tapora Golf Club
- Tapora Hall
- Tapora Reserve (playground, seating and Tennis Courts)
- Tapora School

== Education ==
Tapora School is a coeducational full primary (years 1-8) school with a roll of 21 as of July 2026. The school was founded in 1956.
