= Manukapua Island =

Island in New Zealand

Native name: Manukapua
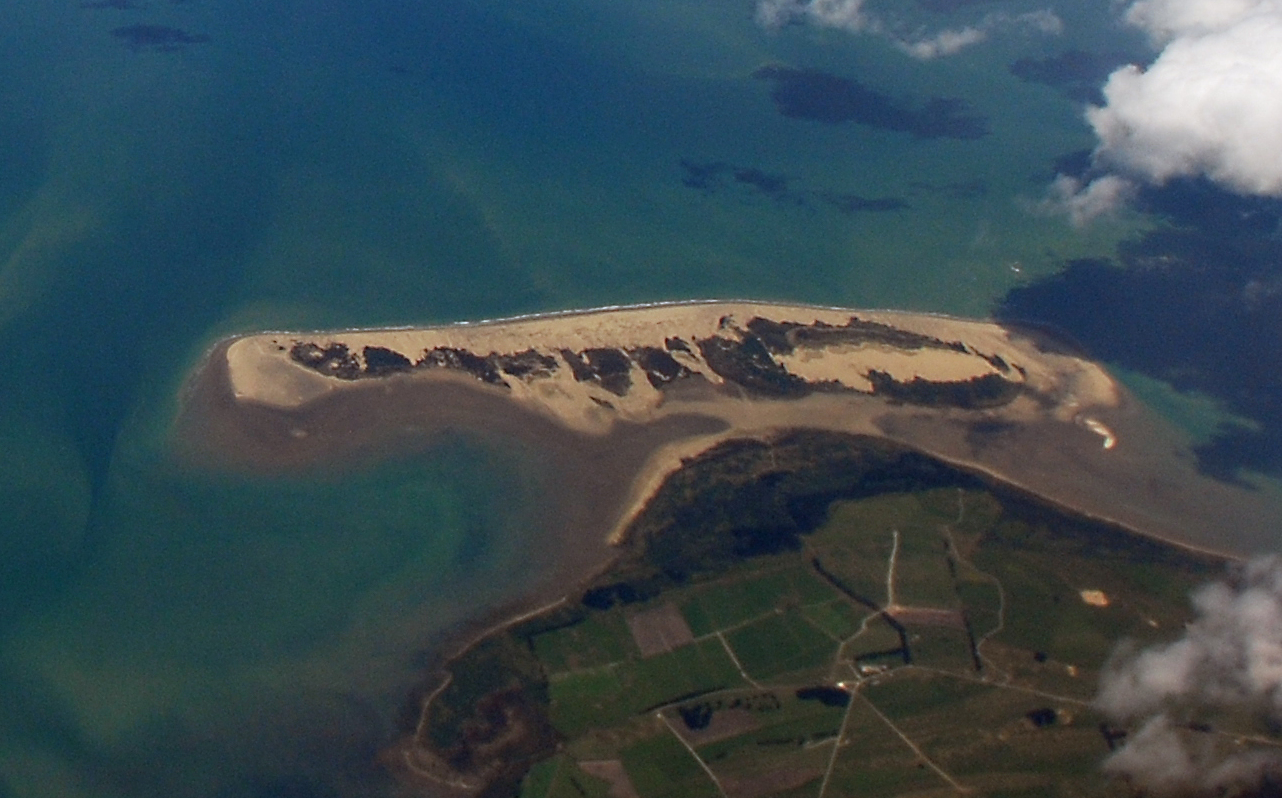
- Aerial view of Manukapua
- Interactive map of Manukapua Island
- Etymology: Cloud of birds

Geography
- Location: Auckland
- Coordinates: 36.3831°S 174.2432°E
- Adjacent to: Kaipara Harbour
- Area: 2,500 m^{2} (27,000 sq ft)
- Length: 4,000 m (13000 ft)
- Width: 1,000 m (3000 ft)

Administration
- New Zealand
- Region: Auckland Region
- Local board: Rodney
- Subdivision: Northern Rodney

Manukapua, also known as Tapora Island, and commonly known as Sand Island or Big Sand Island, is a tidal island in the Kaipara Harbour in the Auckland Region, New Zealand, near Tāpora on the Ōkahukura Peninsula.

== Geography ==
Manukapua is in the central Kaipara Harbour, at the point where the Kaipara Entrance meets the Otamatea Channel and the Tauhoa Channel. The area is dominated by sand dunes and wetlands. The island is joined to the mainland Ōkahukura Peninsula at low tide, and it is possible for people to wade to the island even at high tide.

== History and naming ==
Ngāti Whātua traditions tell of the Māhuhu-ki-te-rangi migratory waka arriving at the Kaipara Harbour, with some of the crew members, including Rongomai, Mawete and Po, settling at Tāporapora, with the descendants of Toi, who already lived in the area. Tāporapora was a fertile peninsula (some sources say an island) that ran from present day Manukapua to the Tasman Sea, splitting the harbour mouth into north and south channels. The name Tāporapora comes from the name of a place in the Polynesian homeland Hawaiki. Rongomai married a local woman and moved his village from out on Tāporapora to Manukapua and the Ōkahukura Peninsula. Tāporapora was washed away by a storm, or possibly a tsunami, leaving Manukapua as a remnant. The island is seen as the birthplace of Ngāti Whātua, and has spiritual importance to the hapū Te Uri-o-Hau.

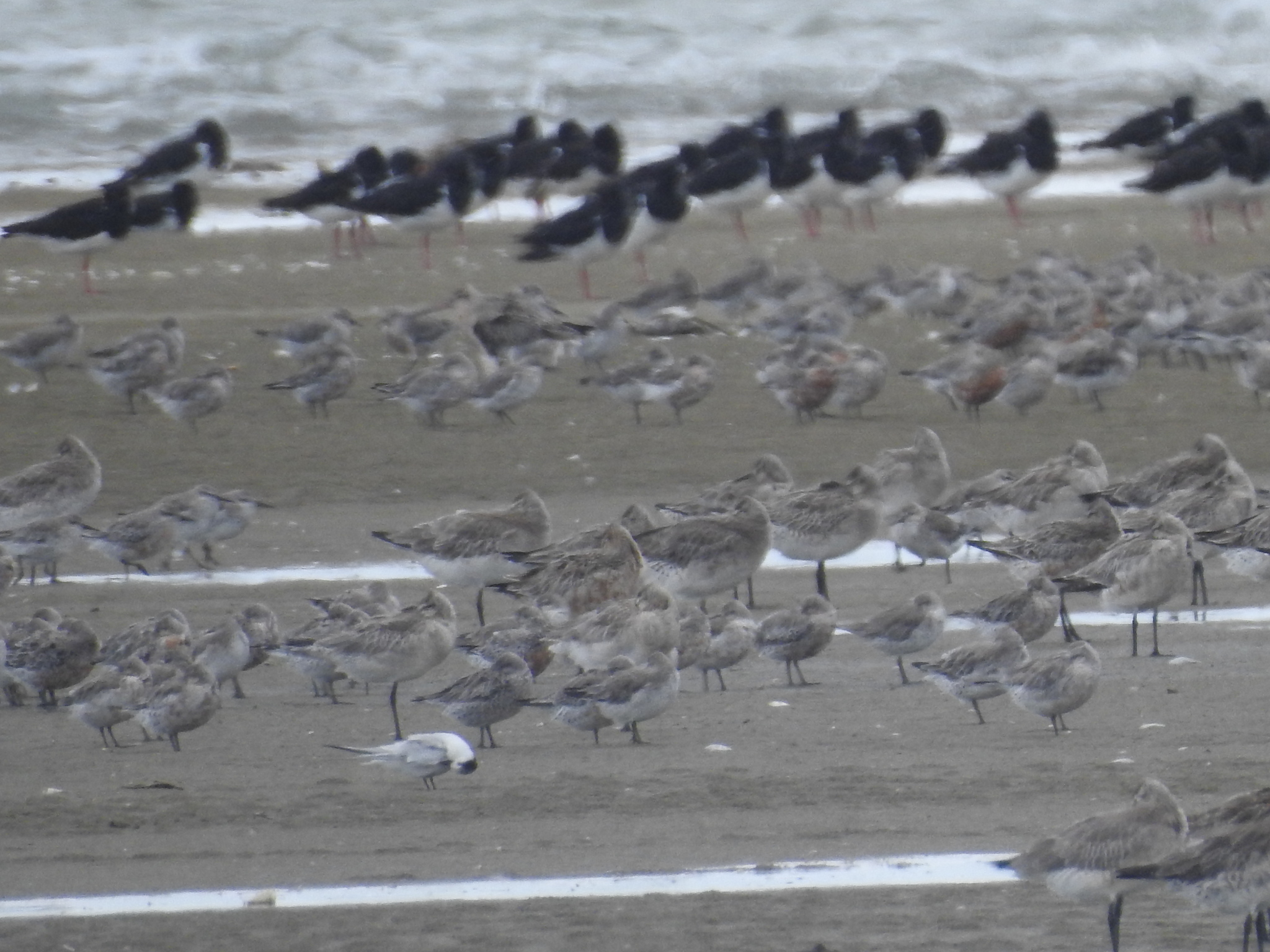
From top, South Island oystercatchers, godwits and a little tern on the island

The island's Māori name Manukapua means "cloud of birds", from manu 'bird' and kapua 'cloud'. Its official name is Manukapua Island. It is also known as Sand Island or Big Sand Island.

In 2013, a fire destroyed all vegetation on the island. In 2019, the Department of Conservation funded a widescale restoration project on the island, which including removing 5 ha (12 acres) of gorse and pampas grass that had grown since the fire, and planting 13,000 native trees.

== Biodiversity ==
Much of the island is located within the Manukapua Government Purpose (Wildlife Management) Reserve, previously known as the Tapora Government Purpose (Wildlife Management) Reserve, and the island is a part of the Manukapua Island and Okahukura Sequence biodiversity focus area. It is an important nesting area for the New Zealand dotterel and New Zealand fairy tern, and is a roosting area for migratory birds.
