= Te Hana =

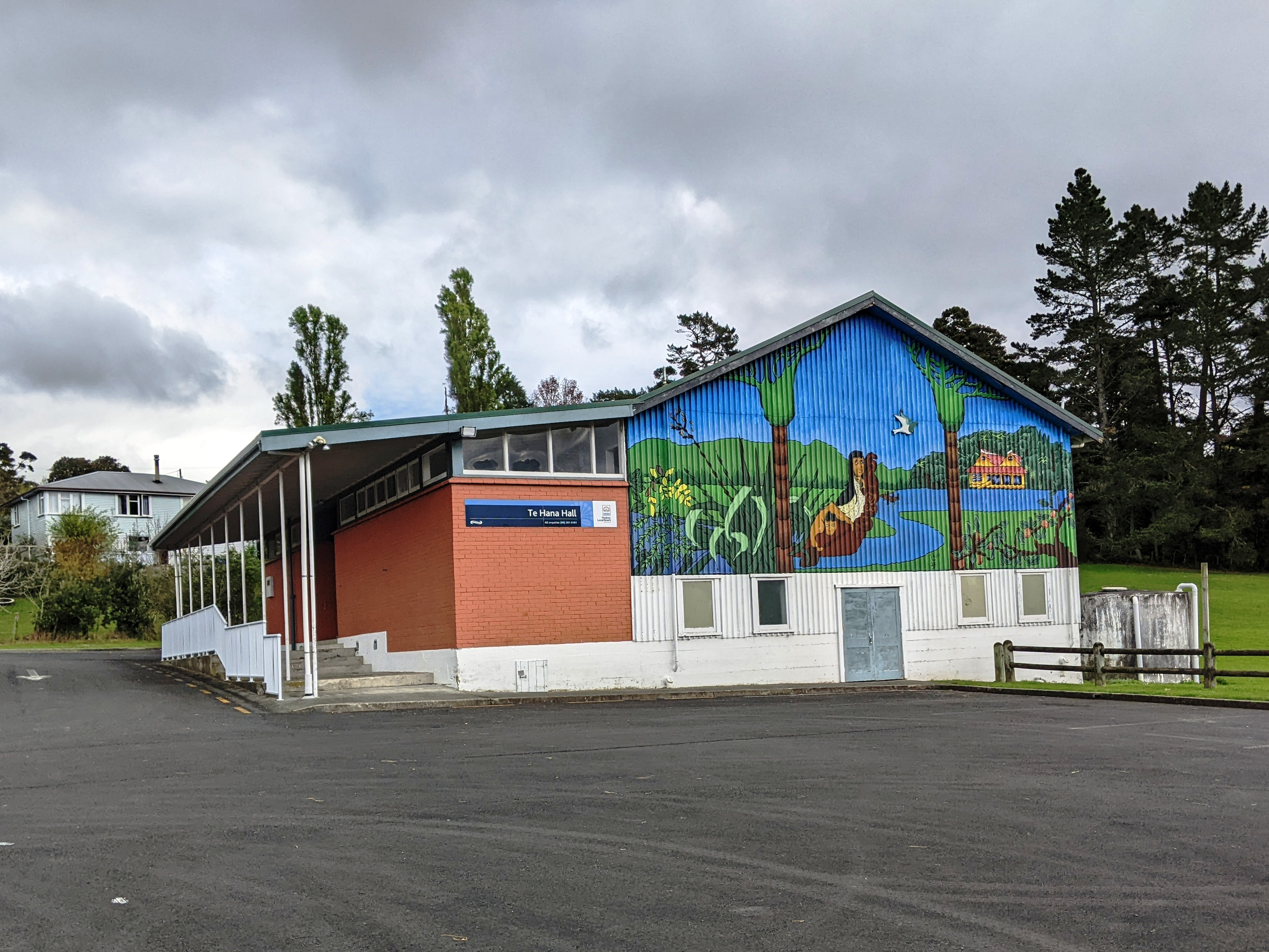
- Te Hana community hall
- Interactive map of Te Hana
- Coordinates: 36.257°S 174.508°E
- Country: New Zealand
- Region: Auckland Region
- Ward: Rodney ward
- Community board: Rodney Local Board
- Subdivision: Wellsford subdivision
- Electorates: Kaipara ki Mahurangi; Te Tai Tokerau

Government
  - Territorial Authority: Auckland Council
  - Mayor of Auckland: Wayne Brown
  - Kaipara ki Mahurangi MP: Chris Penk
  - Te Tai Tokerau MP: Mariameno Kapa-Kingi

Area
  - Total: 0.76 km^{2} (0.29 sq mi)

Population (June 2025)
  - Total: 130
  - Density: 170/km^{2} (440/sq mi)

Te Hana is a small town on State Highway 1 near the northern boundary of Auckland. Wellsford is 5 km (3.1 mi) to the south, and Kaiwaka is 15 km (9.3 mi) northeast. Te Hana Creek runs westward on the northern end of the town to the Kaipara Harbour.

== History ==
The town gained a post office in 1871. A school flourished in Te Hana in the early 20th century.

The Port Albert Co-operative Dairy Company replaced its factory in Port Albert with a more substantial one in Te Hana in 1934. The dairy factory was the town's major employer until it closed in 1987. After it closed Te Hana declined, with a high crime rate, unemployment of 20%, significant substance abuse, and poor living conditions.

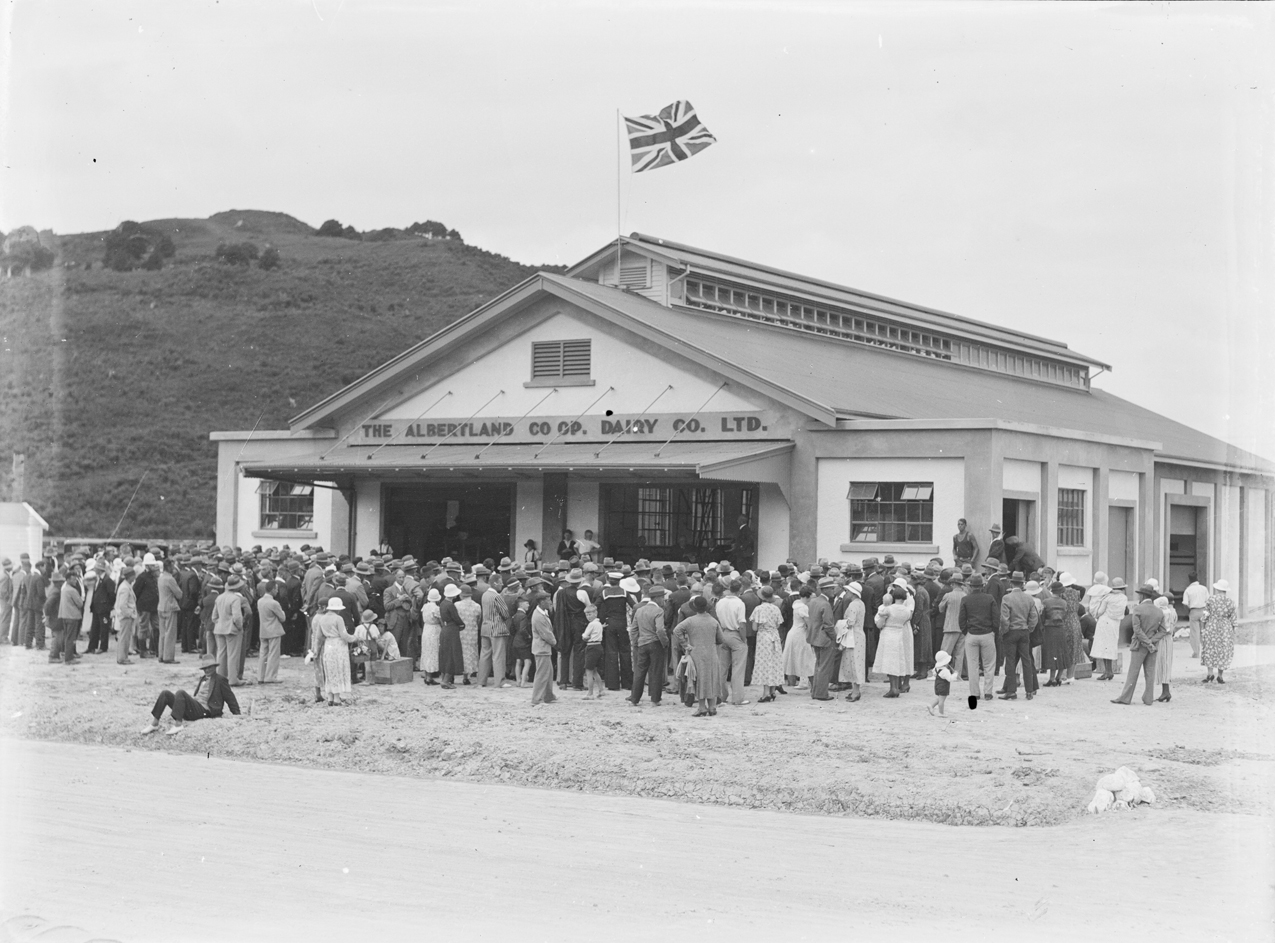
Opening of the dairy factory in 1934

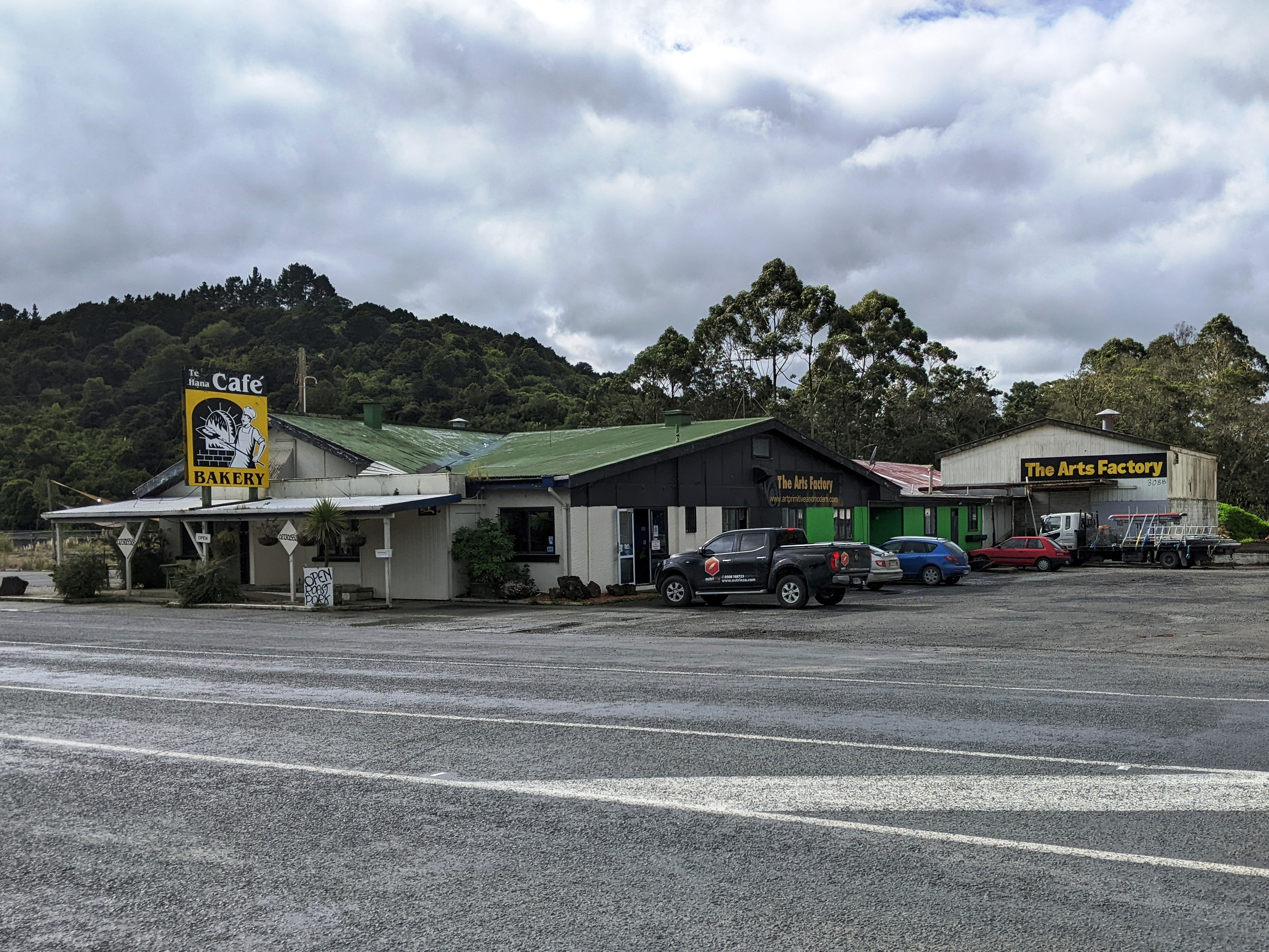
Former dairy factory in 2022

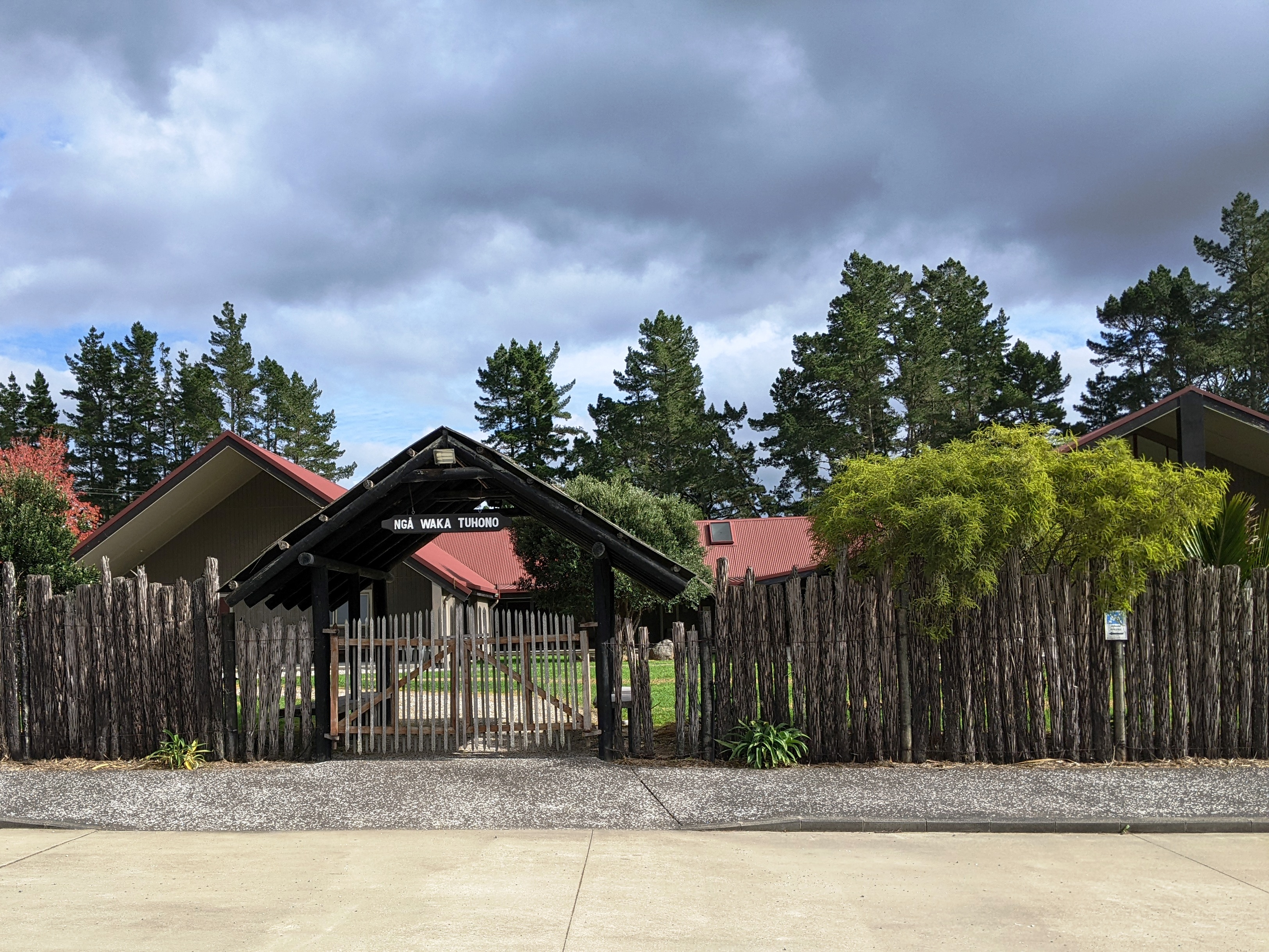
Te Ao Mārama - Māori cultural centre in Te Hana

Te Hana Community Charitable Development Trust was formed in 2002 to rejuvenate the town, with one of its major initiatives a Māori cultural centre to attract tourists with a recreation of a pre-European Māori village.

== Demographics ==
Statistics New Zealand describes Te Hana as a rural settlement, which covers 0.76 km^{2} (0.29 sq mi) and had an estimated population of 130 as of June 2025, with a population density of 171 people per km^{2}. Te Hana is part of the larger Okahukura Peninsula statistical area.

Historical population
Year	Pop.	±% p.a.
2006	102	—
2013	96	−0.86%
2018	105	+1.81%
2023	120	+2.71%

Te Hana had a population of 120 in the 2023 New Zealand census, an increase of 15 people (14.3%) since the 2018 census, and an increase of 24 people (25.0%) since the 2013 census. There were 63 males and 60 females in 39 dwellings. 2.5% of people identified as LGBTIQ+. The median age was 34.7 years (compared with 38.1 years nationally). There were 27 people (22.5%) aged under 15 years, 27 (22.5%) aged 15 to 29, 57 (47.5%) aged 30 to 64, and 9 (7.5%) aged 65 or older.

People could identify as more than one ethnicity. The results were 62.5% European (Pākehā), 42.5% Māori, 7.5% Pasifika, and 7.5% Asian. English was spoken by 97.5%, Māori language by 10.0%, and other languages by 12.5%. No language could be spoken by 2.5% (e.g. too young to talk). The percentage of people born overseas was 15.0, compared with 28.8% nationally.

Religious affiliations were 37.5% Christian, 7.5% Māori religious beliefs, and 2.5% other religions. People who answered that they had no religion were 50.0%, and 5.0% of people did not answer the census question.

Of those at least 15 years old, 6 (6.5%) people had a bachelor's or higher degree, 51 (54.8%) had a post-high school certificate or diploma, and 33 (35.5%) people exclusively held high school qualifications. The median income was $32,200, compared with $41,500 nationally. 6 people (6.5%) earned over $100,000 compared to 12.1% nationally. The employment status of those at least 15 was that 45 (48.4%) people were employed full-time and 18 (19.4%) were part-time.
