= Paparoa =

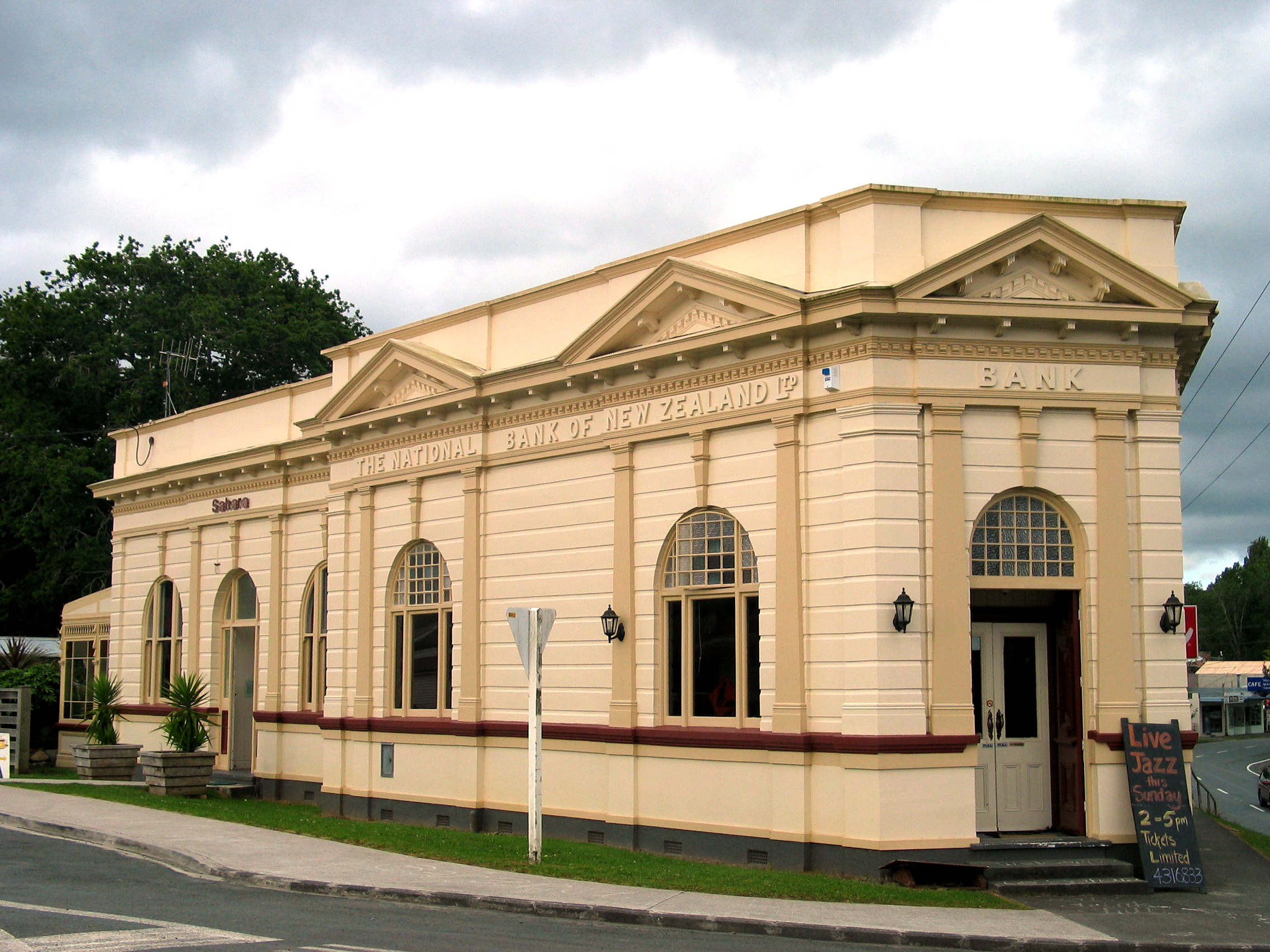
- Former National Bank of New Zealand, Paparoa, Northland (now a private residence) Listed Heritage 1 status
- Interactive map of Paparoa
- Coordinates: 36°5′54″S 174°14′22″E
- Country: New Zealand
- Region: Northland Region
- District: Kaipara District
- Ward: Otamatea Ward
- Electorates: Northland; Te Tai Tokerau

Government
  - Territorial Authority: Kaipara District Council
  - Regional council: Northland Regional Council
  - Mayor of Kaipara: Jonathan Larsen
  - Northland MP: Grant McCallum
  - Te Tai Tokerau MP: Mariameno Kapa-Kingi

Area
  - Total: 8.74 km^{2} (3.37 sq mi)

Population (June 2025)
  - Total: 430
  - Density: 49/km^{2} (130/sq mi)

Paparoa is a settlement in Northland, New Zealand. The Paparoa Stream flows from the east, through the settlement, and into the Paparoa Creek to the south, which joins the Arapaoa River which is part of the Kaipara Harbour. State Highway 12 passes through Paparoa. Matakohe is 6 km to the south west, and Maungaturoto is 12 km east.

The New Zealand Ministry for Culture and Heritage gives a translation of "long flats" for Paparoa.

== History and culture ==
=== European settlement ===
Paparoa was one of several Kaipara settlements established by a religious group known as Albertlanders. Port Albert near Wellsford was the main settlement, and Matakohe was another. They settled at the Paparoa Block in 1863. The land was burnt off so that corn and grass could be planted.

A road was constructed to the port at Pahi in 1865, and one to Matakohe shortly afterwards. A pottery using local clay and a factory making rope and matting from flax operated in the 1870s, and brick and tile yards were established, but their business suffered from the poor roads and high freight charges. The nearest stores were in Pahi, 6 miles (9.7 km) to the south.

The steamer Minnie Casey connected Paparoa with Helensville on the south side of the Kaipara with a weekly service from 1882, and the S.S. Ethel took over from 1891–95, after which services went only to Matakohe and Pahi. The network of roads in the area were improved in the 1880s and 1890s.

In the 1890s, Paparoa had 35 families and about 200 people, mostly living along the banks of the Paparoa River. Including Pahi, there were 400 people in the area. By 1906, the population of Paparoa had doubled. Pastoral farming became established in the area, and a dairy factory was opened in Paparoa in January 1895. A branch of a Helensville-based department store was operating in the town in the 1900s.

In 1907 the National Bank established a branch in Paparoa due to the proximity of the town to both the railway line to the Bay of Islands and the line to the Upper Wairoa and access to the Kaipara Harbour at Pahi. The bank helped finance the shift to agriculture in the region following the decline of timber milling and gum digging. In 1913 the National Bank hired Hobson County engineer Horrace Hammond to design a dedicated premise for the bank, which at the time was renting out a converted factory. Hommand designed a heart kauri and totara neo-classical structure for the bank. The National Bank withdrew from Paparoa in the 1980s. The former bank is registered as a category 1 building by Heritage New Zealand.

The North Auckland railway line reached Huarau, to the east of Paparoa, in the early 1920s. A route through Paparoa was planned at one stage but this did not eventuate. The road to Maungaturoto, which passes through Huarau, was metalled in 1922.

== Demographics ==
Statistics New Zealand describes Paparoa as a rural settlement, which covers 8.74 km^{2} (3.37 sq mi) and had an estimated population of 430 as of June 2025, with a population density of 49 people per km^{2}. Paparoa is part of the larger Otamatea statistical area.

Historical population for Paparoa
Year	Pop.	±% p.a.
2006	270	—
2013	330	+2.91%
2018	363	+1.92%
2023	417	+2.81%

Paparoa had a population of 417 in the 2023 New Zealand census, an increase of 54 people (14.9%) since the 2018 census, and an increase of 87 people (26.4%) since the 2013 census. There were 207 males, 201 females and 9 people of other genders in 153 dwellings. 2.2% of people identified as LGBTIQ+. The median age was 44.2 years (compared with 38.1 years nationally). There were 81 people (19.4%) aged under 15 years, 54 (12.9%) aged 15 to 29, 186 (44.6%) aged 30 to 64, and 99 (23.7%) aged 65 or older.

People could identify as more than one ethnicity. The results were 87.8% European (Pākehā); 15.8% Māori; 2.2% Pasifika; 3.6% Asian; 0.7% Middle Eastern, Latin American and African New Zealanders (MELAA); and 1.4% other, which includes people giving their ethnicity as "New Zealander". English was spoken by 97.8%, Māori language by 4.3%, and other languages by 4.3%. No language could be spoken by 2.2% (e.g. too young to talk). The percentage of people born overseas was 17.3, compared with 28.8% nationally.

Religious affiliations were 47.5% Christian, 1.4% Hindu, 1.4% Buddhist, and 1.4% other religions. People who answered that they had no religion were 41.7%, and 6.5% of people did not answer the census question.

Of those at least 15 years old, 33 (9.8%) people had a bachelor's or higher degree, 189 (56.2%) had a post-high school certificate or diploma, and 105 (31.2%) people exclusively held high school qualifications. The median income was $28,600, compared with $41,500 nationally. 42 people (12.5%) earned over $100,000 compared to 12.1% nationally. The employment status of those at least 15 was that 135 (40.2%) people were employed full-time, 45 (13.4%) were part-time, and 6 (1.8%) were unemployed.

=== Otamatea statistical area ===
Otamatea statistical area includes Pahi, and surrounds but does not include Maungaturoto. It covers 244.85 km^{2} (94.54 sq mi) and had an estimated population of 1,920 as of June 2025, with a population density of 7.8 people per km^{2}.

Historical population for Otamatea statistical area
Year	Pop.	±% p.a.
2006	1,407	—
2013	1,482	+0.74%
2018	1,713	+2.94%
2023	1,890	+1.99%

Otamatea had a population of 1,890 in the 2023 New Zealand census, an increase of 177 people (10.3%) since the 2018 census, and an increase of 408 people (27.5%) since the 2013 census. There were 963 males, 915 females and 12 people of other genders in 765 dwellings. 2.4% of people identified as LGBTIQ+. The median age was 49.2 years (compared with 38.1 years nationally). There were 333 people (17.6%) aged under 15 years, 225 (11.9%) aged 15 to 29, 837 (44.3%) aged 30 to 64, and 495 (26.2%) aged 65 or older.

People could identify as more than one ethnicity. The results were 90.6% European (Pākehā), 17.5% Māori, 3.0% Pasifika, 1.7% Asian, and 3.2% other, which includes people giving their ethnicity as "New Zealander". English was spoken by 98.6%, Māori language by 3.2%, Samoan by 0.3%, and other languages by 5.1%. No language could be spoken by 1.4% (e.g. too young to talk). The percentage of people born overseas was 15.4, compared with 28.8% nationally.

Religious affiliations were 33.8% Christian, 0.6% Hindu, 0.8% Māori religious beliefs, 0.6% Buddhist, 0.8% New Age, and 1.0% other religions. People who answered that they had no religion were 53.5%, and 9.2% of people did not answer the census question.

Of those at least 15 years old, 165 (10.6%) people had a bachelor's or higher degree, 906 (58.2%) had a post-high school certificate or diploma, and 438 (28.1%) people exclusively held high school qualifications. The median income was $30,200, compared with $41,500 nationally. 105 people (6.7%) earned over $100,000 compared to 12.1% nationally. The employment status of those at least 15 was that 651 (41.8%) people were employed full-time, 222 (14.3%) were part-time, and 27 (1.7%) were unemployed.

== Notable people ==
- Alex Tait, cricketer, born in Paparoa.
- James Wright, potter, worked in Paparoa in the mid-1870s.
- Sam Hunt, poet, lives in Paparoa.

== Education ==
Paparoa School is a coeducational contributing primary (years 1-6) school with a roll of 44 students as of July 2026. The school was established in 1870, and had a roll ranging from 27 to 42 students up to 1899.
