= Wharehine River =

River in the Auckland Region, New Zealand

- Mouth of the Wharehine River Wharehine River (New Zealand)
- Route of the Wharehine River

Location
- Country: New Zealand
- Region: Auckland Region

Physical characteristics
- Source
  - location: Kaiwakawaka River
  - coordinates: 36.2933°S 174.4363°E
- Mouth: Oruawharo River
  - coordinates: 36.2758°S 174.4209°E

Basin features
- Progression: Wharehine River → Oruawharo River → Kaipara Harbour → Tasman Sea
- Tributaries
  - left: Waireia River

The Wharehine River is a river in New Zealand. Located west of Wellsford, it is a tributary of the Oruawharo River.

== See also ==
- List of rivers of New Zealand
