= Edwin Stanley Brookes Jnr =

English surveyor (1840-1904)

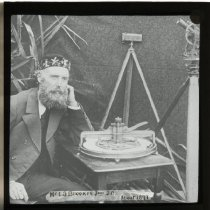
Brookes with surveying tools

Edwin Stanley Brookes Jnr (19 May 1840 – 12 August 1904) was a prominent surveyor in the settlement of New Zealand during the mid-late 19th century.

== Biography ==
=== Childhood and emigration ===
Edwin Stanley Brookes was born on 19 May 1840 in Radford, Nottingham, England. He was the eldest son of the Rev. E. S. Brookes Snr, who was one of the leaders of the Nonconformist Emigration Association and founders of the Albertland Special Settlement in Auckland Province in 1862. Edwin Jnr emigrated aboard the Matilda Wattenbach, arriving in Auckland on 8 September 1862. With Edwin on the Matilda Wattenbach were his two brothers, George Hovey Brookes and Charles Henry Brookes. His parents came later, in 1865, on the 'Caduceus', with the two youngest children. Other siblings came Elizabeth Ann, who was married to Samuel White, and Albert Edward Brookes, who all arrived on the 'Gertrude'.

=== Surveying ===
Brookes was immediately appointed to one of the surveying parties that laid out the settlement, and after some years experience in the profession was appointed Assistant Surveyor on the Taranaki Provincial staff in 1873. He spent his time in Taranaki surveying settlements from Inglewood to Hāwera and the Waimate Plains, working in conjunction with fellow surveyor Peter Cheal, and also carrying out surveys between Waitara and the Auckland Provincial boundary. In 1877 he introduced the use of the long steel wire for chaining purposes in place of the cumbersome Gunter's chain. He oversaw the cutting of a Meridian line from Waitara southwards for a distance of 42 miles, and the original subdivision of blocks on the eastern side of the mountain. Brookes Road, on the outskirts of Stratford, takes its name from the surveyor.

In 1885 Brookes resigned from the Lands and Survey Department and returned to the Albertland settlement. He went on to publish Frontier Life in Taranaki in 1892, in which he describes his surveying experiences, and particularly the tumultuous events surrounding the Parihaka affair and the subdivision of the Waimate Plains.

=== Family ===
Brookes was married twice, firstly to Jane Litchfield in 1870, with whom he had seven children, and secondly Sarah Anne Hine in 1886, with whom he had two children.

=== Death ===
Brookes died at Wharehine on 12 August 1904.
