= Port Albert, New Zealand =

Port Albert
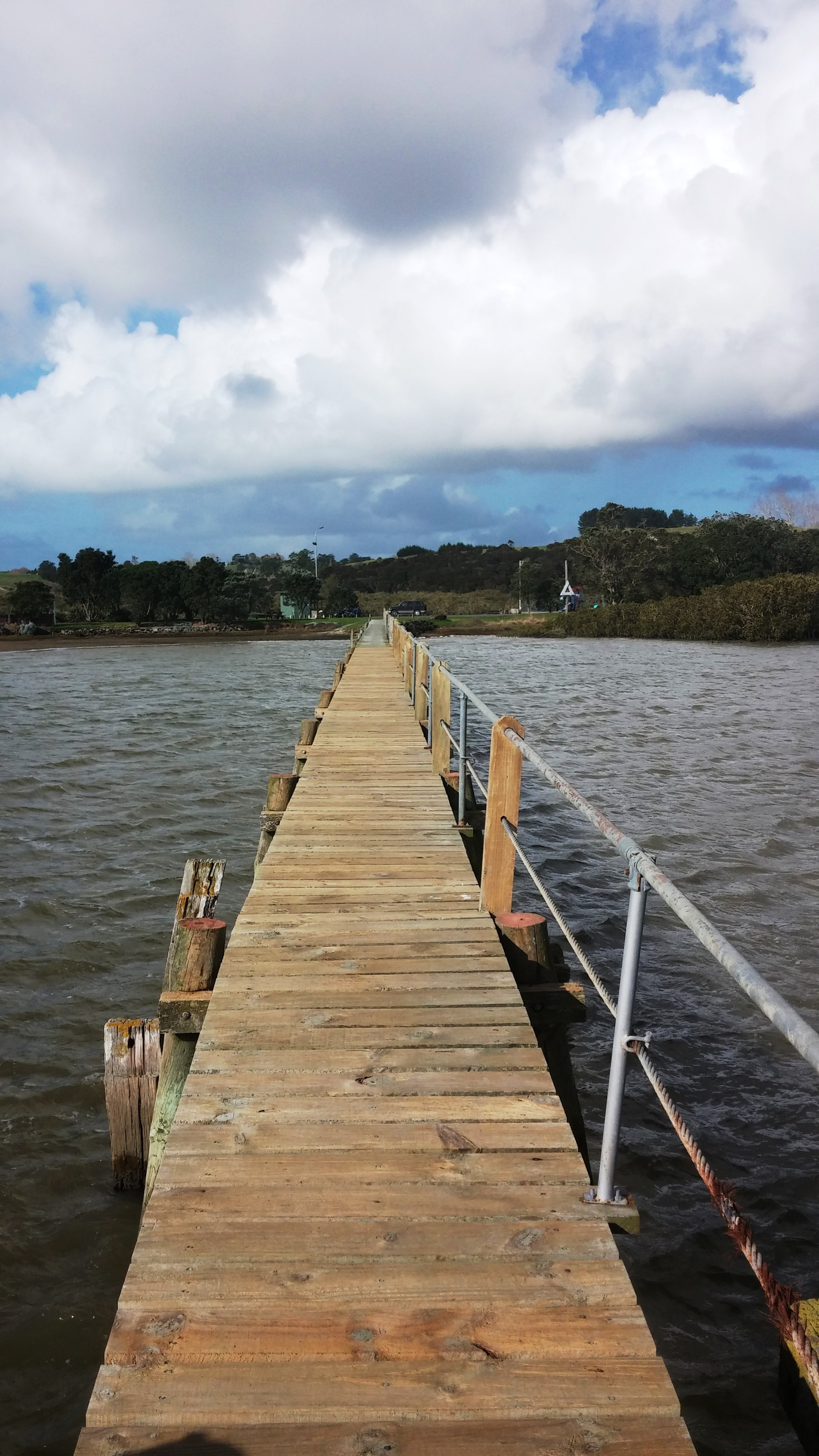
- Port Albert jetty, 2014
- Nickname: Albertland
- Interactive map of Port Albert
- Coordinates: 36.2747°S 174.4301°E
- Country: New Zealand
- Region: Auckland Region
- Ward: Rodney ward
- Community board: Rodney Local Board
- Subdivision: Wellsford subdivision
- Electorates: Kaipara ki Mahurangi; Te Tai Tokerau

Government
  - Territorial Authority: Auckland Council
  - Mayor of Auckland: Wayne Brown
  - Kaipara ki Mahurangi MP: Chris Penk
  - Te Tai Tokerau MP: Mariameno Kapa-Kingi

Area
  - Total: 2.61 km^{2} (1.01 sq mi)

Population (June 2025)
  - Total: 120
  - Density: 46/km^{2} (120/sq mi)

Port Albert is situated on the shores of the Kaipara Harbour, approximately 8 kilometres west of Wellsford, in the Auckland Region of New Zealand. Originally called Albertland, it was the last of the major organised British settlements in New Zealand.

== History ==
In 1861 William Rawson Brame, a Birmingham Baptist minister, founded the Albertland Special Settlement Association, organising non-conformist immigrants to come to New Zealand as part of the last organised British settlement in New Zealand. They included farmers, carpenters, servants, butchers, joiners, cabinetmakers, millers, drapers, sawyers, clerks and many other trades. Albertland, named for Prince Albert, was planned as a large-scale settlement, and was one of the final settlements sponsored by the colonial government.

The Albertlanders set sail for New Zealand on 29 May 1862, aboard numerous ships including the Matilda Wattenbach, Hanover and William Miles. The Matilda Wattenbach, which in some documents is referred to simply as the Matilda, made it to Auckland first on 8 September 1862, and the new settlers made their own way to the settlement of Albertland (now known as Port Albert).

On 21 January 1862, a party set out from Auckland heading northward along the east coast in a whale boat. On board the boat were two Non-Conformist Settlement Associates, a provincial Surveyor and five men rowing the boat. The group landed late that afternoon at Wade (now Silverdale) where they stayed the night before setting off the next day on foot up the Waiwera Valley having to cross several creeks on the way. From there they set off by boat heading for the Puhoi river where there was a Māori settlement. This area of land would have been suitable for the Albertland settlement due to it covering both the west and east of the Island; however, the Māori had a claim to the water frontage of both sides of the island so landing would have been hard for the settlers. The explorers then surveyed a block just north of Helensville called the Komokoriki block. This block was so overgrown that the explorers struggled to walk through the dense bush and it would require too much work to bring it back to productive farming land. They then heard of the Oruawharo block on the Kaipara Harbour and decided to head back to Silverdale to get fresh supplies before attempting the five-day trek to this block.

After surveying the majority of the Okahukura Peninsula the explorers gained information from residents who lived on the Ōruawharo River and decided to create the Albertland settlement a few kilometres up where there was good scrubland and bush with kauri for building, using an Auckland Provincial Council scheme which "...provided 40 acres [16 hectares] each for a man and his wife, and 20 acres [8 ha] for each child between five and 18 years old – provided they paid their own fare and stayed on the land for five years, built a house, and began farming...".

A sign at Port Albert concludes:

More immigrant ships followed, but isolation and difficulties of access hindered progress and the original plans for a township at Port Albert were thwarted.

== Demographics ==
Statistics New Zealand describes Port Albert as a rural settlement, which covers 2.61 km^{2} (1.01 sq mi) and had an estimated population of 120 as of June 2025, with a population density of 46 people per km^{2}. Port Albert is part of the larger Okahukura Peninsula statistical area.

Historical population
| Year | Pop. | ±% p.a. |
|---|---|---|
| 2006 | 96 | — |
| 2013 | 126 | +3.96% |
| 2018 | 120 | −0.97% |
| 2023 | 120 | +0.00% |

Port Albert had a population of 120 in the 2023 New Zealand census, unchanged since the 2018 census, and a decrease of 6 people (−4.8%) since the 2013 census. There were 66 males and 54 females in 48 dwellings. 2.5% of people identified as LGBTIQ+. The median age was 50.2 years (compared with 38.1 years nationally). There were 18 people (15.0%) aged under 15 years, 12 (10.0%) aged 15 to 29, 60 (50.0%) aged 30 to 64, and 30 (25.0%) aged 65 or older.

People could identify as more than one ethnicity. The results were 92.5% European (Pākehā); 15.0% Māori; and 2.5% Middle Eastern, Latin American and African New Zealanders (MELAA). English was spoken by 95.0%, Māori language by 2.5%, and other languages by 5.0%. No language could be spoken by 2.5% (e.g. too young to talk). The percentage of people born overseas was 17.5, compared with 28.8% nationally.

Religious affiliations were 22.5% Christian, and 2.5% Hindu. People who answered that they had no religion were 70.0%, and 2.5% of people did not answer the census question.

Of those at least 15 years old, 9 (8.8%) people had a bachelor's or higher degree, 54 (52.9%) had a post-high school certificate or diploma, and 30 (29.4%) people exclusively held high school qualifications. The median income was $35,000, compared with $41,500 nationally. 6 people (5.9%) earned over $100,000 compared to 12.1% nationally. The employment status of those at least 15 was that 48 (47.1%) people were employed full-time and 15 (14.7%) were part-time.

== See also ==
- Edwin Stanley Brookes Jnr
- Matakohe
- Paparoa
- Tāpora
- Wellsford
