= Ōkahukura Peninsula =

Peninsula in New Zealand

Coordinates: 36.354°S 174.329°E

The Ōkahukura Peninsula, sometimes called the Tapora Peninsula, is the southern-most peninsula of the three eastern Kaipara Harbour peninsulae. The Ōkahukura Peninsula was occupied by Mãori prior to European settlement, with Europeans using the peninsula to mill and dig for kauri gum. In 1877 Thomas Henry Fitzgerald purchased the entire peninsula and converted it to pastoral land. Through out the 20th-century the peninsula was subdivided into smaller run holdings.

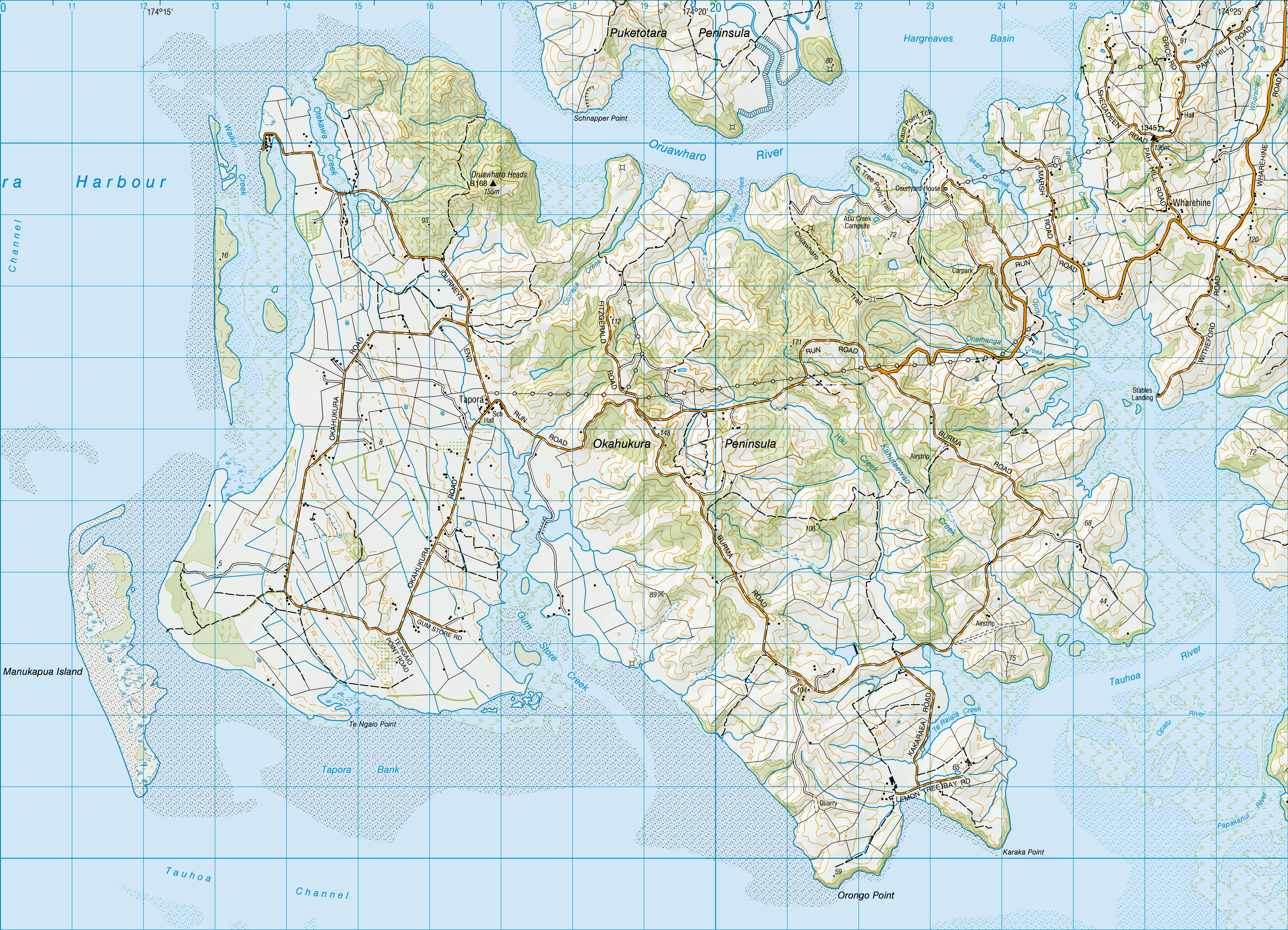
Topographic map of the Ōkahukura Peninsula

== Geography ==
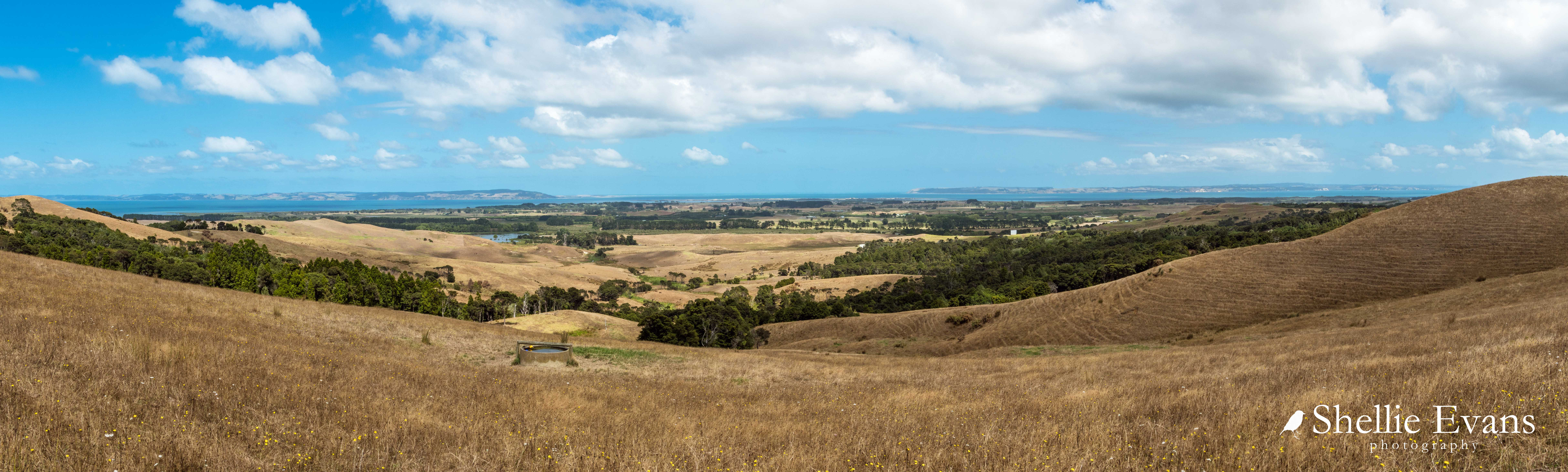
Panorama of Ōkahukura Peninsula

The Ōkahukura Peninsula lays south of the Hukatere and Puketotara peninsulae, and alongside these two make up the three eastern peninsulae of the Kaipara Harbour. Ōkahukura is part of the North Auckland Peninsula. It is bounded by the Ōruawharo River and Hargreaves Basin at the north, the Tahuroa River to the east, and the Kaipara to the south. The peninsula is primarily dominated by agriculture, with the western part being a coastal plain developed in the late 20th century, and the east being earlier developed and primarily pasture, with some bush and commercial forests. The southwest has paleodunes, although many of these have been covered up for pastoral land.

== Geology ==
The Ōkahukura Peninsula is made up of four rock groups: West Northland chaos-breccia, Waitemata Group, the Waitakere Group, and Quaternary dunes and terrace deposits.

== Ecology ==
The Ōkahukura has a diverse population of avifauna and good plant biodiversity amongst the wetlands. Birds found on the peninsula include: eastern bar-tailed godwit, eastern knot, pied oystercatcher, white-faced heron, blue reef heron, wrybill plover, golden plover, banded dotterel, New Zealand dotterel, Himantopus, red-necked stint, ruddy turnstone, pied shag, little pied shag, black shag, little black shag, black-backed gull, red-billed gull, white-fronted tern, fairy tern, caspian tern, little tern, gannet, New Zealand pigeon, silvereye, grey warbler, fantail, sacred kingfisher, Australasian swamphen, grey duck, New Zealand pipit, South Island oystercatcher, spur-winged plover, fernbird, goldfinch, song thrush, magpie, banded rail, spotless crake, and marsh crake.

There is a proposal to install a predator proof fence to the peninsula to assist avifauna breeding populations.

== Demographics ==
Demographics for the Okahukura Peninsula statistical area, which includes Tāpora, Port Albert and Te Hana, are covered at Tāpora#Okahukura Peninsula.

== Economy ==
Since the 2020s land on the peninsula has been developed for horticulture.

== Archaeology ==
The Ōkahukura Peninsula has a large amount of archaeological sites, primarily relating to Mãori occupation. 16 pā and numerous middens have been recorded. The most common shellfish found in the middens is the New Zealand cockle. In one analysis of a midden 99.8% of the identifiable species were cockle. (Note: The remaining species were New Zealand pipi, Dosina, hornshell, mud snail, white rock shell, rock oyster, and Pelicaria vermis.) Three of the pah are located on headlands along the Ōruawharo River. The remnants of a gum digger camp have been located near Atiu Creek. Chert, obsidian, and adze are some identified artefacts from the peninsula. No evidence of Mãori agriculture has been discovered but this may be due to the land being altered when converted for European agriculture.

Two non-fortified settlements have been discovered at Te Ngaio Point. The settlements were seasonally occupied with the primary food source being godwits.

== History ==
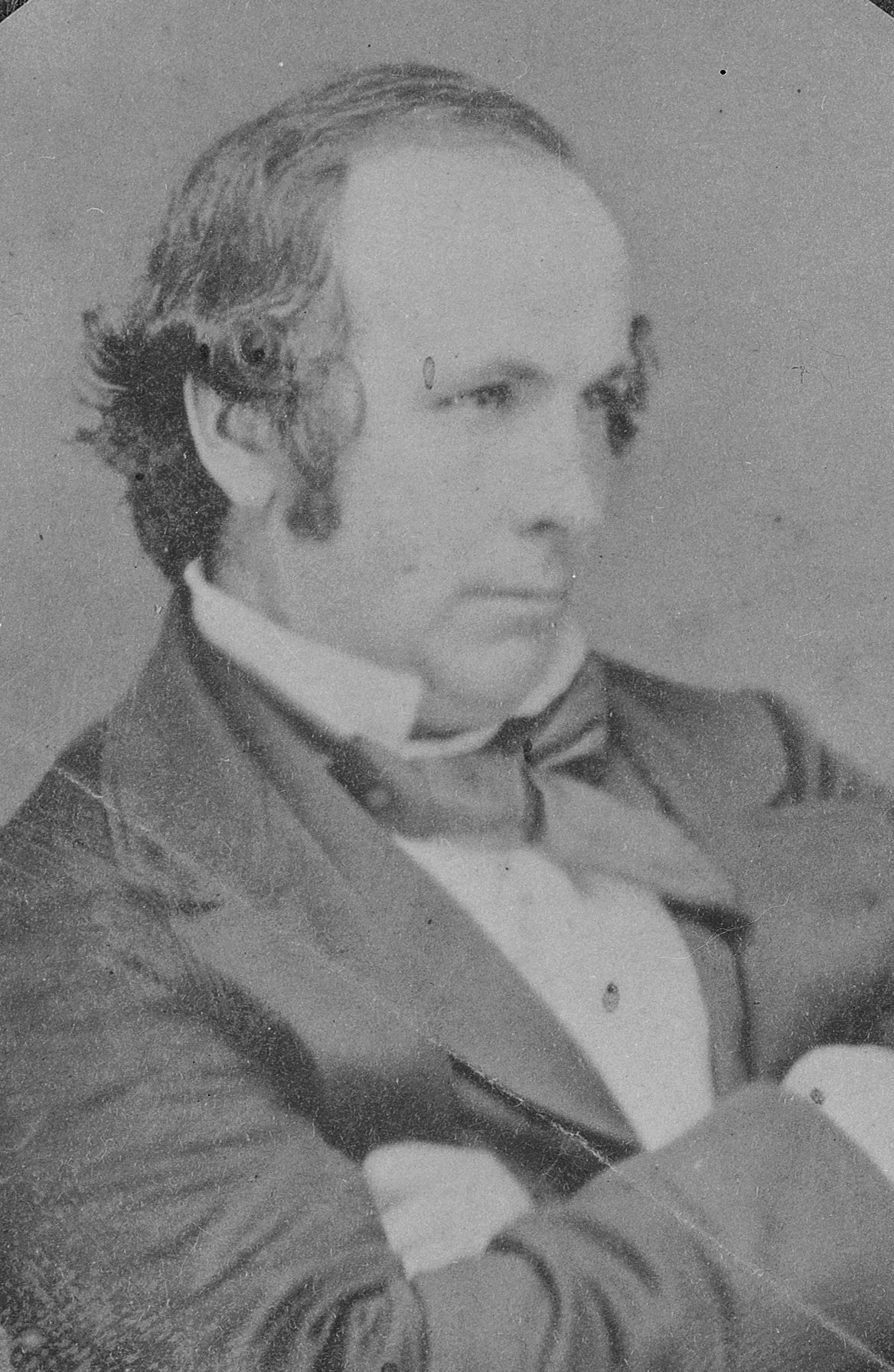
Fitzgerald in 1860

Thomas Henry Fitzgerald purchased the peninsula in 1877. Milling and gum digging occurred on the peninsula with Fitzgerald turning the peninsula into stock grazing land. The government purchased land on the peninsula to be developed into smaller farm holdings for returned servicemen.

== Transport ==
Mãori would traverse the peninsula on foot along the ridges. These ridges became roads for access to farms following the development of the peninsula. The Opou portage was used by both Mãori and early settlers of Port Albert. A proposal existed in the 1970s to have a causeway cross Waikiri Creek to open up several islands for farming.
