= Rodney Local Board =

Coordinates: 36.39732061°S 174.6615562°E

Rodney Local Board Te Poari ā-Rohe o Rodney
- Local board of Rodney
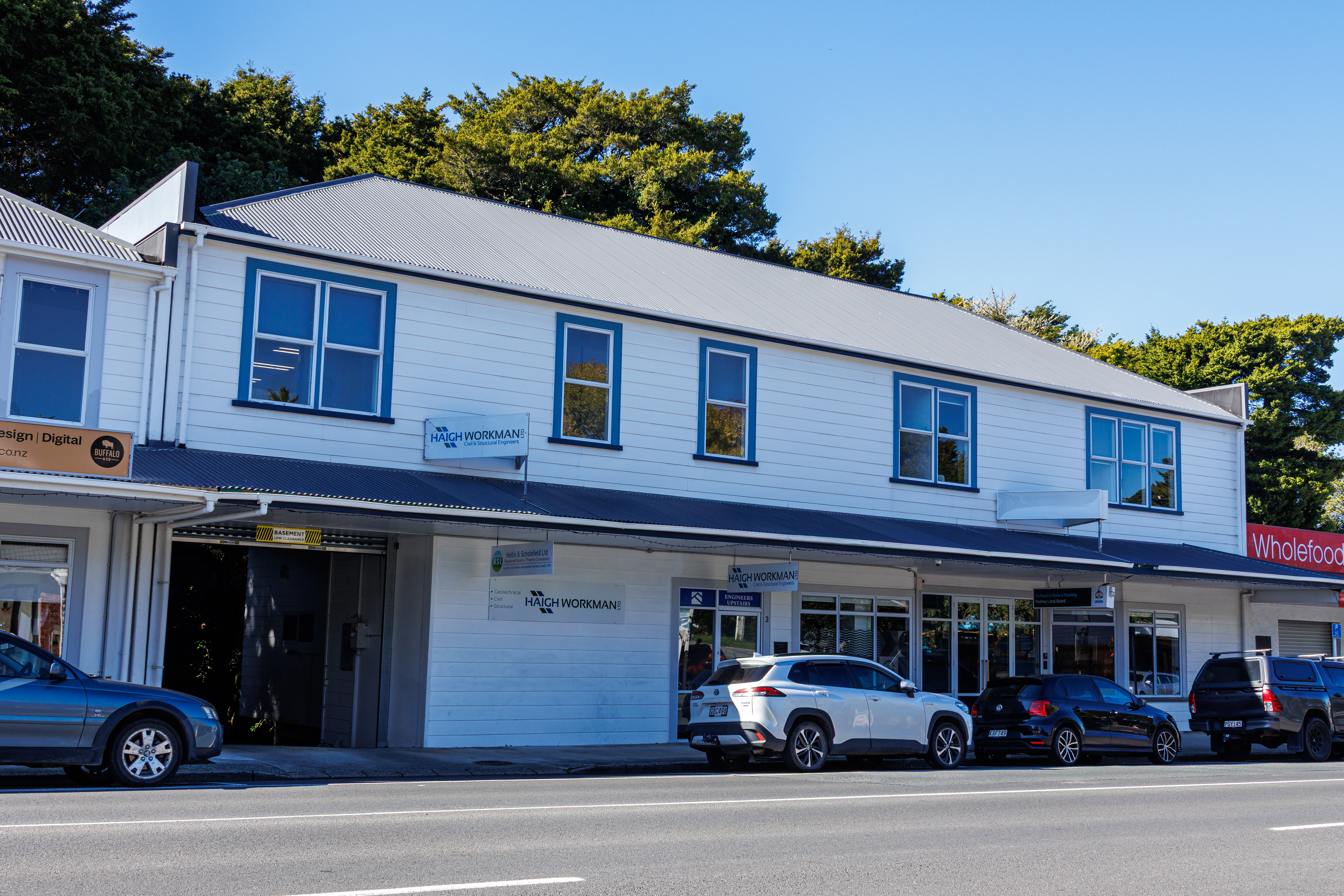
- The building housing Rodney Local Board in Warkworth

- Country: New Zealand
- Region: Auckland
- Territorial authority: Auckland Council
- Ward: Rodney Ward
- Legislated: 2010

Area
  - Land: 2,275.00 km^{2} (878.38 sq mi)

Population (June 2025)
  - Total: 83,400

Local Board Members

Leadership
- Chairperson: Guy Wishart, Independent
- Deputy chairperson: Ivan Wagstaff, Independent

Structure
- Seats: 9
- Political groups: Independents (9)
- Length of term: 3 years

Elections
- Last election: 2025
- Next election: 2028

Meeting place
- 3 Elizabeth Street, Warkworth

Rodney Local Board is one of the 21 local boards of Auckland Council, and is administered by the ward councillor representing Rodney Ward. Located in the northern part of the Auckland region, it is named after the former Rodney District which existed before its amalgamation into Auckland Council in 2010. Nine elected Local Board members sit on the board.

The Rodney Local Board is charged with decision-making on local issues, activities, and services, and provide input into regional strategies, policies, plans, and decisions.

== Governance ==
The ward was initially divided into four parts, each containing a number of towns and settlements:

- Kumeū subdivision: Kumeū, Helensville, Muriwai, Kaukapakapa and South Head
- Dairy Flat subdivision: Dairy Flat, Coatesville, Wainui and Waitoki
- Warkworth subdivision: Warkworth, Matakana, Leigh, Puhoi, Ahuroa, Kawau Island
- Wellsford subdivision: Wellsford, Te Ārai, Pākiri, Port Albert, Tapora

The subdivision boundaries were changed prior to the 2025 elections. Following these changes the board area was split into five subdivisions: Northern Rodney, Southern Kaipara, Warkworth, Kumeū, and Dairy Flat.

== Demographics ==
Rodney Local Board Area covers 2,275.00 km^{2} (878.38 sq mi) and had an estimated population of 83,400 as of June 2025, with a population density of 37 people per km^{2}.

== 2025-2028 term ==
The current board members for the 2025-2028 term, elected at the 2025 local elections, are:

Name	Affiliation	Subdivision	Position
Guy Wishart		Kumeū	Chairperson
Ivan Wagstaff	Independent	Warkworth	Deputy Chairperson
Tim Holdgate	Independent	Warkworth	Board member
Colin Smith		Northern Rodney	Board member
Geoff Upson		Southern Kaipara	Board member
Mark Dennis		Southern Kaipara	Board member
Lisa Whyte	Independent	Dairy Flat	Board member
Matt Ross	Independent	Kumeū	Board member
Paul Manton	Independent	Northern Rodney	Board member

== 2022 local elections ==
Geoff Upson, (no affiliation) (Kumeū) 5340 Votes
Tim Holdgate, Independent (Warkworth) 4696 Votes
Guy Wishart, Rodney First (Kumeū) 3978 Votes
Brent Bailey, Chair. Rodney First (Kumeū) 3708 Votes
Mark Dennis, Rodney First (Kumeū) 3467 Votes
Ivan Wagstaff, Rodney First (Warkworth) 3346 Votes
Michelle Lisa Carmichael, Independent (Warkworth) 3143 Votes
Colin Smith, Independent (Wellsford) 1,303 votes
Louise Johnston, Deputy Chair. Rodney First (Dairy Flat) elected unopposed

== 2019 local elections ==
Phelan Pirrie, Chair. Rodney First (Kumeū) 5790 Votes
Beth Houlbrooke, Deputy Chair. Rodney First (Warkworth) 4993 Votes
Brent Bailey, Rodney First (Kumeū) 4520 Votes
Danielle Hancock, Rodney First (Kumeū) 4134 Votes
Vicki Kenny, Rodney First (Kumeū) 4089 Votes
Tim Holdgate, Independent (Warkworth) 3782 Votes
Steven Garner, Rodney Now (Warkworth) 3184 Votes
Colin Smith, Independent (Wellsford) elected unopposed
Louise Johnston, Rodney First (Dairy Flat) elected unopposed

== 2016 local elections ==
Phelan Pirrie, Rodney First, Deputy Chair (Kumeū) 4873 Votes
Cameron Brewer, Rodney First, (Kumeū) 4018 Votes
Allison Roe, Rodney First, (Warkworth) 3969 Votes
Tessa Huntington, Independent (Warkworth) 3935 Votes
Brenda Steele, Independent (Kumeū) 3922 Votes
Brent Bailey, Rodney First (Kumeū) 3518 Votes
Beth Houlbrooke, Rodney First, Chair (Warkworth) 3230 Votes
Louise Johnston, Independent (Dairy Flat) 906 Votes
Colin Smith, Independent (Wellsford)

== 2013 local elections ==
The members elected in the 2013 local body elections:

Brenda Steele, Chair (Kumeū) 3045 Votes
Steven Garner, Deputy Chair(Warkworth) 2723 Votes
Thomas Grace (Kumeū) 2587 Votes
Phelan Pirrie (Kumeū) 2557 Votes
Warren Flauntey (Kumeū) 2512 Votes
Beth Houlbrooke (Warkworth) 2323 Votes
Greg Sayers (Warkworth) 1837 Votes
John McClean (Dairy Flat) 683 Votes
James Colville (Wellsford) 534 Votes

== 2010 local elections ==
The members elected in the 2010 local body elections:

Bob Howard, Chair (Kumeū) 3503 Votes
Warren Flauntey (Kumeū) 3575 Votes
Brenda Steele (Kumeū) 3349 Votes
Thomas Grace (Kumeū) 3388 Votes
John McClean (Dairy Flat) 836 Votes
Steven Garner (Warkworth) 3809 Votes
June Turner (Warkworth) 3533 Votes
Tracey Martin (Warkworth) 3610 Votes
James Rolfe (replaced by James Colville before term ended) (Wellsford)

== Economy ==
The area has a rural economy. Dairy farming, horticulture, winemaking, forestry and tourism are major industries.
