= Ōruawharo River =

River in the North Island, New Zealand

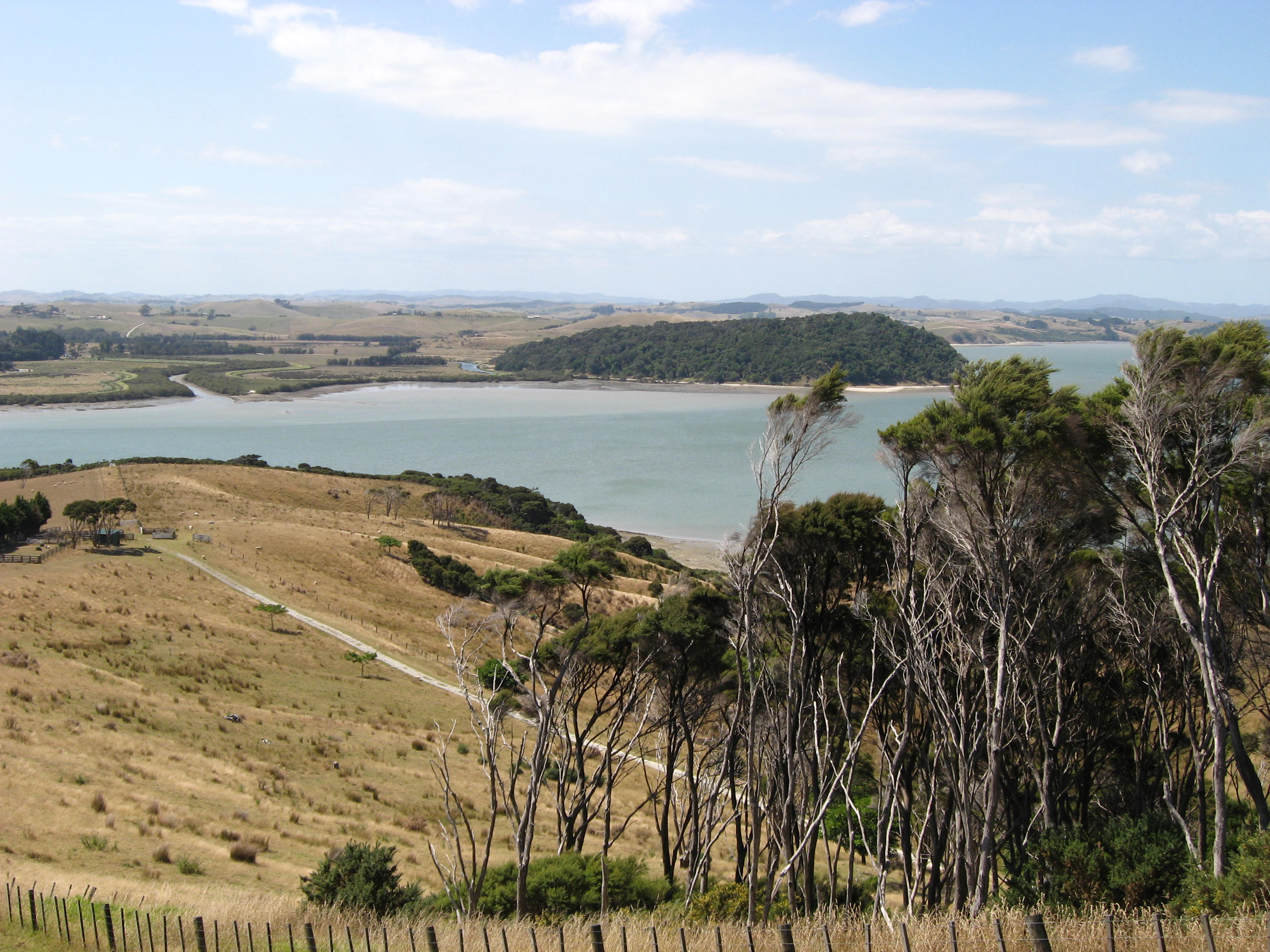
- The Oruawharo River as seen from Ātiu Creek Regional Park, draining into the Kaipara Harbour

- Mouth of the Ōruawharo River Ōruawharo River (Northland Region) Ōruawharo River (New Zealand)
- Route of the Ōruawharo River

Location
- Country: New Zealand
- Region: Northland and Auckland regions

Physical characteristics
- Source: Confluence of the Topuni River and Maeneene Creek
  - coordinates: 36.2587°S 174.4697°E
- Mouth: Ōruawharo River
  - coordinates: 36.2978°S 174.284°E

Basin features
- Progression: Kaipara Harbour → Tasman Sea
- Landmarks: Hargreaves Basin
- Tributaries
  - left: Wharehine River, Wharehanu Creek, Takapau Creek, Takahe Creek, Atiu Creek, Mullet Creek, Oturapa Creek
  - right: Koareare Creek, Kaira Creek

The Ōruawharo River flows westward into the Kaipara Harbour west of Wellsford on the North Auckland Peninsula of New Zealand. The boundary between the Northland Region and the Auckland Region runs along the length of the river.

The New Zealand Ministry for Culture and Heritage gives translations of "place of [a] stretched-out pit" or "place of Ruawharo [a personal name]" for Ōruawharo.

== History ==
In pre-European times, the Ōruawharo River was important to the Tāmaki Māori people of the Kaipara Harbour. The Opou portage allowed waka to be transported across the Ōkahukura Peninsula between the Ōruawharo and Tauhoa rivers.

Port Albert, on the south bank, was the centre of Albertland, an organised British Nonconformist Christian settlement in the 1860s.

== See also ==
- List of rivers of New Zealand
