= Wellsford =

Wellsford Whakapirau (Māori)
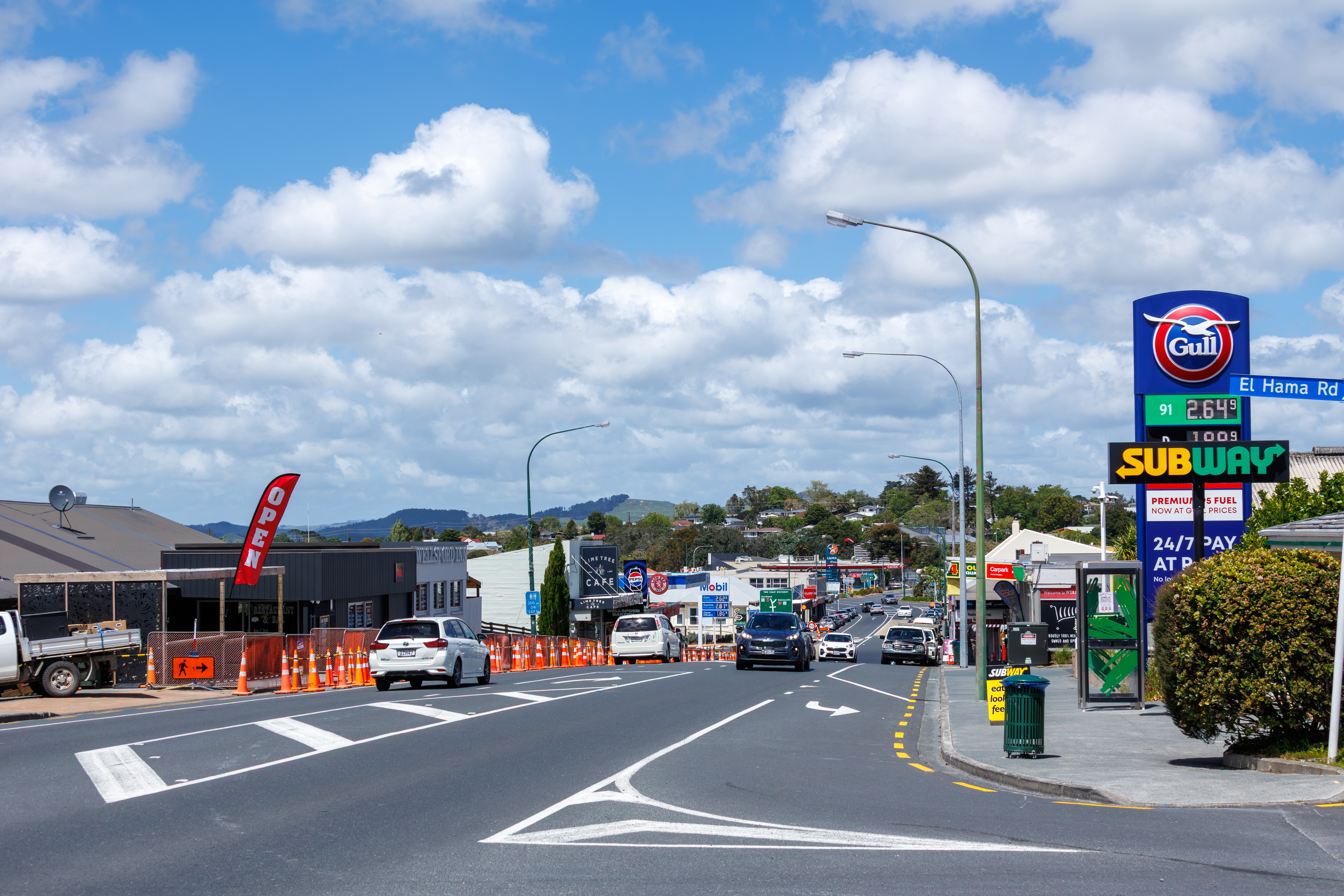
- Main Street in Wellsford
- Interactive map of Wellsford
- Coordinates: 36°17′45″S 174°31′24″E
- Country: New Zealand
- Region: Auckland
- Ward: Rodney ward
- Community board: Rodney Local Board
- Subdivision: Wellsford subdivision
- Electorates: Kaipara ki Mahurangi; Te Tai Tokerau

Government
  - Territorial Authority: Auckland Council
  - Mayor of Auckland: Wayne Brown
  - Kaipara ki Mahurangi MP: Jessica Rowe
  - Te Tai Tokerau MP: TBD

Area
  - Total: 4.72 km^{2} (1.82 sq mi)

Population (June 2025)
  - Total: 2,110
  - Density: 447/km^{2} (1,160/sq mi)
- Postcode(s): 0900, 0977, 0975, 0972, 0974, 0973

Wellsford (Māori: Whakapirau) is a town on the Northland Peninsula in the northern North Island of New Zealand. It is the northernmost major settlement in the Auckland Region, and is 77 kilometres (48 mi) northwest of the Auckland CBD. It is a major regional centre, being located at the junction of State Highways 1 and 16, almost halfway between Auckland and the Northland city of Whangārei.

The eastern Kaipara Harbour has been settled by Māori since the 13th or 14th centuries, who utilised the inland forests and marine resources of the Kaipara Harbour. The area became home to the Ngāti Whātua collective Te Uri-o-Hau by the mid-17th century, with hapū including Ngāti Mauku, Ngāti Tahuhu and Ngāti Rongo being established from the descendants of Haumoewhārangi, and by strategic marriages with Te Kawerau hapū.

Wellsford was established by the Albertlanders in 1862, a group of Baptist tradespeople and farmers from the Birmingham area who settled the southern Ōruawharo River, developing into a timber and kauri gum. By the early 20th century, the area developed into a regional centre for dairy farming, in part due to the opening of Wellsford railway station in 1909, linking the town to Auckland.

== Etymology ==
The settlement was originally known by its Māori name Whakapirau, which is the name of the local creek flowing into the Kaipara Harbour. The settlers disliked the name, which they interpreted to mean "stinking canoe", and began searching for a new name. The name was changed to Wellsford at a public meeting sometime between the late 1860s and early 1870s. The name was suggested by resident D.R. Lester, allegedly by creating an acronym from the surnames of settler families in the area. The earliest known references in print to Wellsford date to 1874. The modern site of Wellsford township was often referred to as the Gum Ridge in the 1870s.

== Geography ==
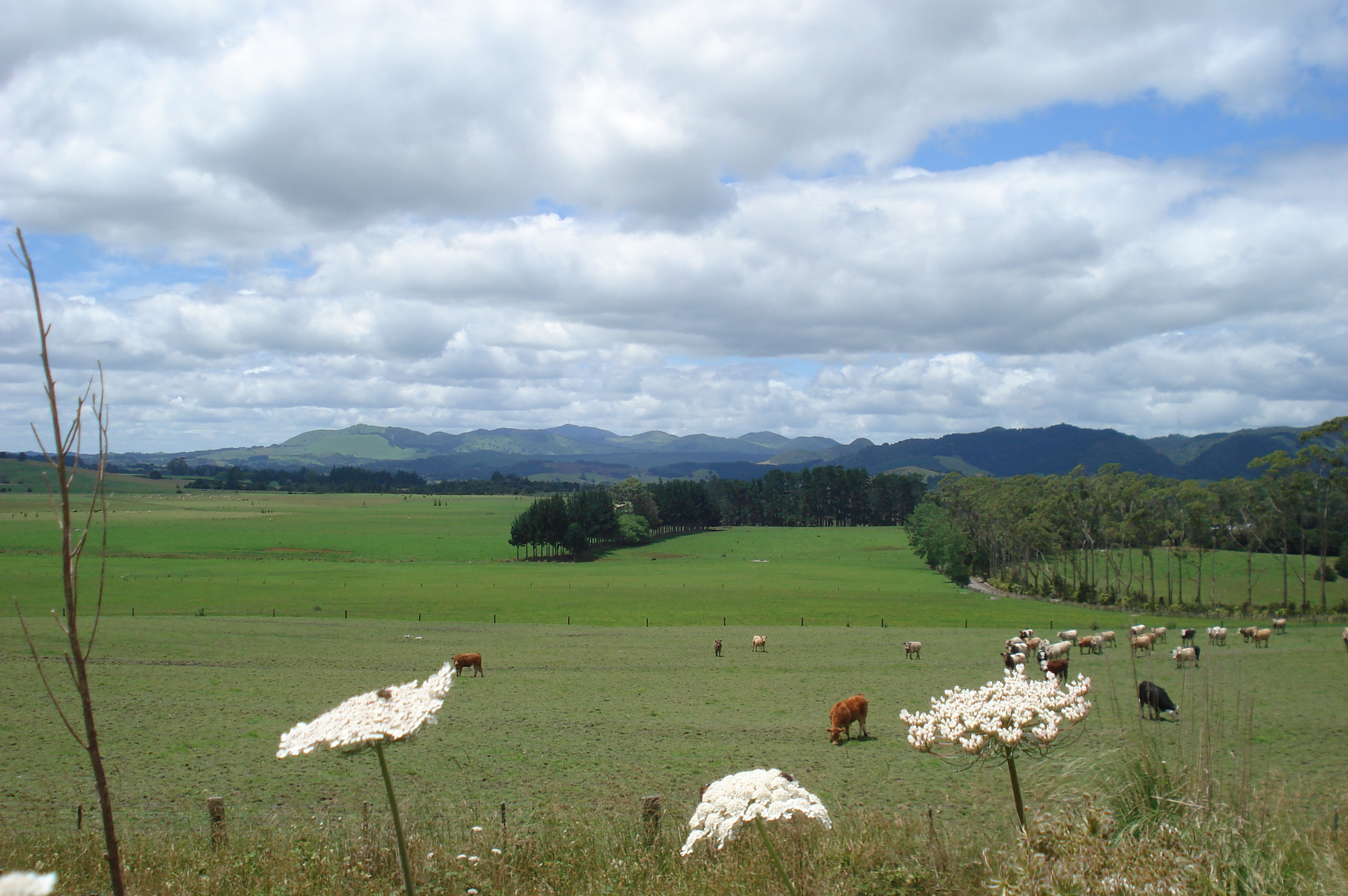
View of rural Wellsford farmland

Wellsford is close to a narrowing of the Northland Peninsula caused by an arm of the Kaipara Harbour on the west coast extending inland for 20 kilometres (12 mi) from the body of the harbour, stretching to within 15 kilometres (9.3 mi) of the east (Pacific Ocean) coast.

The town is located on hilltops at the junction between State Highway 1 and State Highway 16. The upper reaches of the Whakapirau Creek are located to the north of the town, while southern Wellsford is in the catchment of the Hōteo River. The Whakapirau Creek is a tributary of the Ōruawharo River, an arm of the Kaipara Harbour.

The highest point in the town is a 135 metres (443 ft) hill located east of the junction of Matheson Road and Worthington Road.

== History ==
=== Māori history ===
During the mid-18th century, Ngāti Whātua peoples of Northland migrated south to the Kaipara Harbour. The northern and eastern Kaipara, including Wellsford, were controlled by Te Uri-o-Hau, a Ngāti Whātua tribal grouping led by Haumoewhārangi. Ngāti Rongo developed as a hapū in the area through the union between Haumoewhārangi's granddaughter Moerangaranga and Maki's son Ngāwhetu, and Ngāti Manuhiri developed ties with Te Uri-o-Hau. Te Uri-o-Hau, including the hapū Ngāti Mauku and Ngāti Tahuhu, lived seasonally along the Oruawharo River.

In the 1820s during the Musket Wars, the eastern Kaipara was depopulated, as people sought refuge in other parts of the country. Te Uri-o-Hau and Ngāti Rango gradually returned to the area by the late 1830s.

=== Early colonial era ===
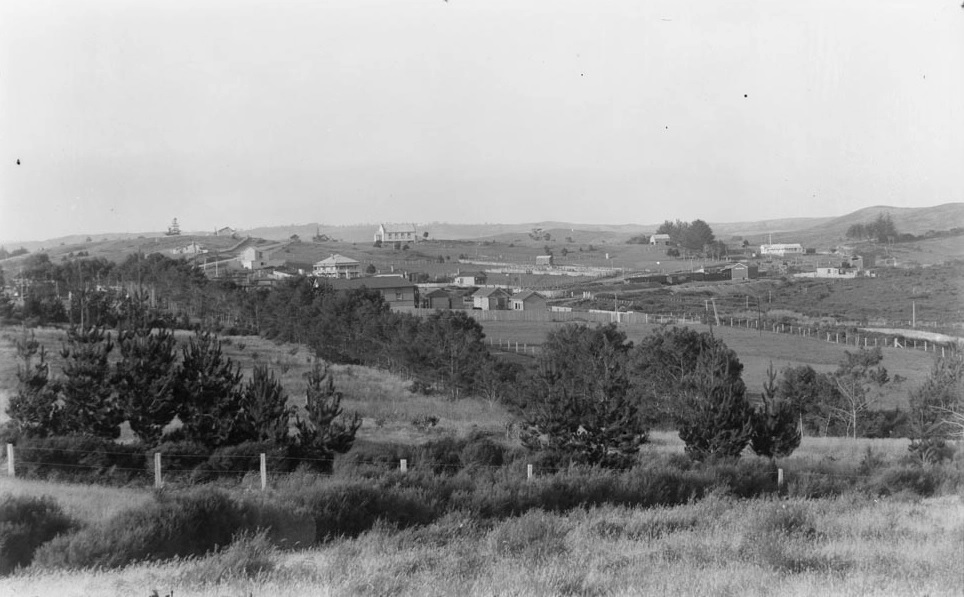
View of rural Wellsford in 1914

The banks of the Ōruawharo River were purchased by the Crown in 1860, followed by the Hoteo Block to the south in 1868.

Under a Special Settlement Scheme by the Government, the Oruawharo Block became a planned settlement, predominantly settled by Baptist tradespeople and farmers from the Birmingham area, who settled between 1862 and 1865 at Tāpora, Port Albert and Wellsford. These settlers called themselves the Albertlanders, after Prince Albert, Queen Victoria's consort. They were a "breakaway group from the Anglican Church looking for a new world". Wellsford was originally known by the name Whakapirau, and settlers established a settlement between the Whakapirau Stream and the eastern borders of the Oruawharo Block.

Initial industry at Whakapirau was dominated by the timber trade, and in 1864 Nicholson's timber mill was established on the southern banks of the Ōruawharo River. Kauri gum diggers' camps were established across the area in the 1870s, including a 500 acres (200 ha) area called the Wayby Kauri Gum Reserve that was set aside for the practice. The modern Wellsford township site was also dug for kauri gum, and was often referred to as The Gum Ridge. Members of Te Uri-o-Hau traded and intermingled with the Alberton settlers. The settlement's modern name, Wellsford, was likely adopted in the early 1870s. Wellsford would move eastwards over time to its current location.

In 1885, the Crown purchased the Pakiri Block from Ngāti Manuhiri, an area that included the areas immediately adjacent to Wellsford. This led to the expansion of Wellsford to the south, away from the Whakapirau Stream.

=== Establishment of the railway, modern development ===
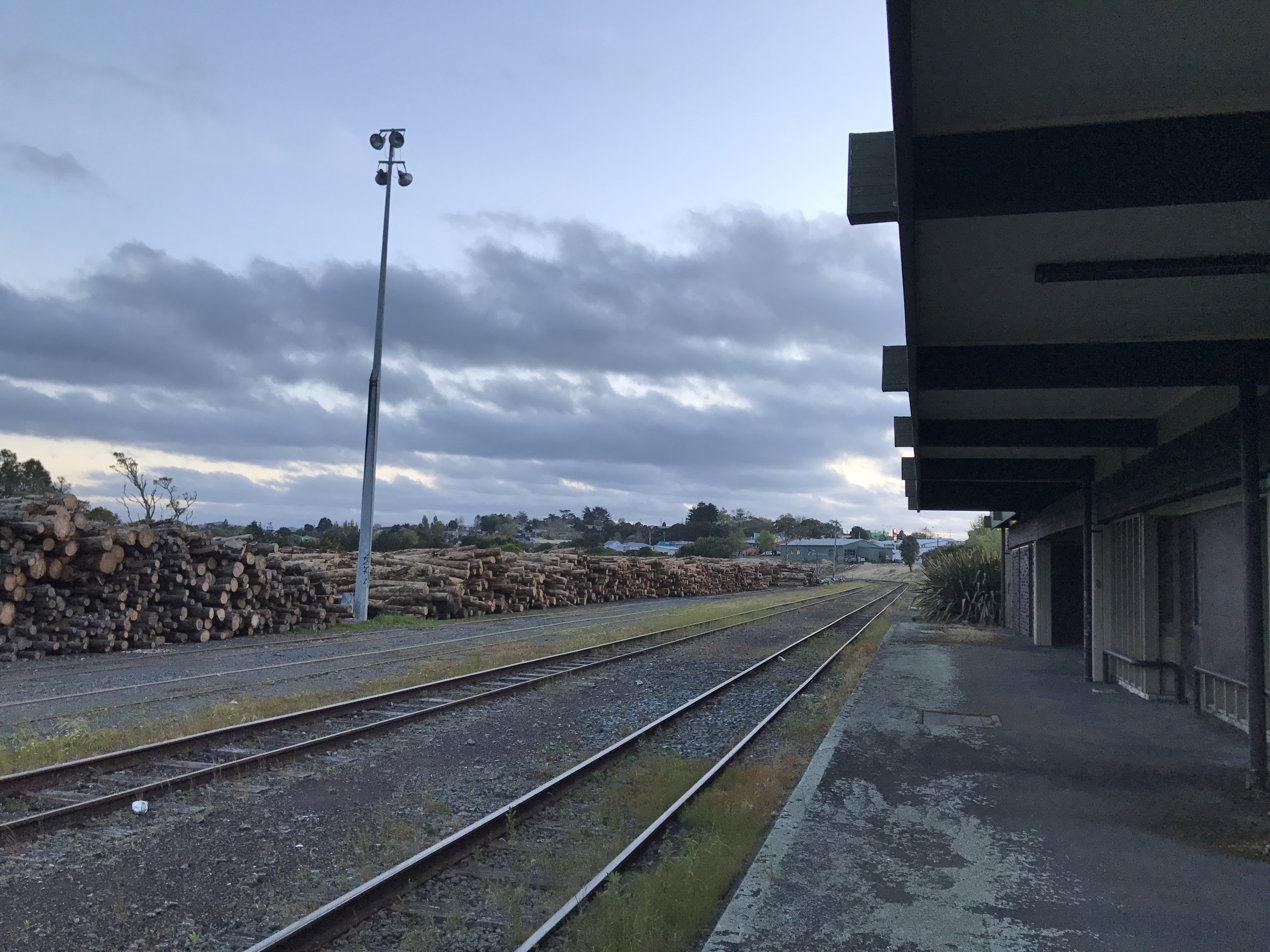
Wellsford railway station on the North Auckland Line in 2018 with logs waiting to be loaded onto a train.

By 1900, the timber and kauri gum trades had begun to recede, and settlers turned to dairy farming as a primarily source of income. The Wayby Co-operative Dairy Company established in 1902. In 1909, the North Auckland Line was extended north to Wellsford. This led to economic development in Wellsford, especially dairy farming and sheep farming operations. During this period, the town gradually moved away from the shores of the Whakapirau Stream, with the new centre of Wellsford developing near the train station.

Dairy farming in the region intensified further with the establishment of better roads in the 1930s. As roads improved, the town developed as a service stop for people travelling between Auckland and Whangārei along State Highway 1. Passenger train services to Wellsford ceased in 1975. In 1979, Irwin Industrial Tools was established in Wellsford, constructing circular saw-blades and growing to be a major local employer, before closing in 2009.

In 1990, the Albertland Heritage Museum opened in Wellsford.

By the 21st century, tourism and lifestyle blocks has increasingly drawn people to Wellsford. The Auckland Northern Motorway is planned to be extended from Warkworth to Wellsford in the future, and housing developments in the 2020s have been predicted to increase the size of the town by more than 800 houses.

== Demographics ==
Wellsford is described by Statistics New Zealand as a small urban area. It covers 4.72 km^{2} (1.82 sq mi) and had an estimated population of 2,110 as of June 2025, with a population density of 447 people per km^{2}.

Historical population
Year	Pop.	±% p.a.
2006	1,671	—
2013	1,743	+0.60%
2018	1,974	+2.52%
2023	2,037	+0.63%
The 2006 population is for a smaller area of 4.55 km^{2}. Source:

Wellsford had a population of 2,037 in the 2023 New Zealand census, an increase of 63 people (3.2%) since the 2018 census, and an increase of 294 people (16.9%) since the 2013 census. There were 1,035 males, 1,002 females and 3 people of other genders in 750 dwellings. 2.1% of people identified as LGBTIQ+. The median age was 36.0 years (compared with 38.1 years nationally). There were 453 people (22.2%) aged under 15 years, 381 (18.7%) aged 15 to 29, 855 (42.0%) aged 30 to 64, and 348 (17.1%) aged 65 or older.

People could identify as more than one ethnicity. The results were 78.5% European (Pākehā); 25.2% Māori; 6.6% Pasifika; 8.7% Asian; 0.9% Middle Eastern, Latin American and African New Zealanders (MELAA); and 2.2% other, which includes people giving their ethnicity as "New Zealander". English was spoken by 95.4%, Māori language by 4.4%, Samoan by 0.3%, and other languages by 9.7%. No language could be spoken by 3.1% (e.g. too young to talk). New Zealand Sign Language was known by 0.1%. The percentage of people born overseas was 21.5, compared with 28.8% nationally.

Religious affiliations were 32.8% Christian, 1.2% Hindu, 0.7% Islam, 2.9% Māori religious beliefs, 0.7% Buddhist, 0.6% New Age, and 1.0% other religions. People who answered that they had no religion were 53.5%, and 6.8% of people did not answer the census question.

Of those at least 15 years old, 138 (8.7%) people had a bachelor's or higher degree, 888 (56.1%) had a post-high school certificate or diploma, and 504 (31.8%) people exclusively held high school qualifications. The median income was $34,700, compared with $41,500 nationally. 111 people (7.0%) earned over $100,000 compared to 12.1% nationally. The employment status of those at least 15 was that 729 (46.0%) people were employed full-time, 216 (13.6%) were part-time, and 48 (3.0%) were unemployed.

== Education ==
Rodney College is a secondary (years 9–13) school with a roll of 368 students. Wellsford School is a full primary (years 1–8) school with a roll of 306 students. Rodney College's Board of Trustees was dismissed in August 2008 and a Ministry of Education commissioner appointed. By 2016, the college was performing well.

Living Way Christian School closed at the end of 2018 due to falling rolls.

Wellsford, Tauhoa, Pākiri, Tāpora, Tomarata and Mangawhai Primary Schools all cater for students from year 1–8, and collectively contribute to the annual in take of roughly 80 year 9 students at Rodney College.

All the schools are coeducational. Rolls are as of July 2026.

== Sport ==
Being a rural town, sport plays a big part in Wellsford's day-to-day life with rugby, soccer, netball, cricket, tennis and athletics being amongst the more popular sports played. The Wellsford Golf Club is popular among the locals and also houses squash courts. Rollerskating, archery and bowling, (indoors and outdoors) are also available, while equestrian is also popular in the area.

== Local government ==
With the abolition of the provinces of New Zealand in 1876, Wellsford became part of the newly formed Rodney County. In 1953 the town committee for Wellsford was formed. This became the Wellsford County Borough Council in 1971 and in 1974 it became the Wellsford District Community Council.

From 1989 to 2010, Wellsford was part of Rodney District.

In November 2010, all city and district councils in the Auckland Region were merged into a single unitary authority, Auckland Council, with Warkworth in the Rodney Local Board area. Electors in Wellsford vote for the seven-member Rodney Local Board, and also a Rodney ward councillor, who represents the area on the Auckland Council.
