= The Piano =

1993 film by Jane Campion

- Theatrical release poster
- Directed by: Jane Campion
- Written by: Jane Campion
- Produced by: Jan Chapman; Alain Depardieu
- Starring: Holly Hunter; Harvey Keitel; Sam Neill; Anna Paquin; Kerry Walker; Genevieve Lemon
- Cinematography: Stuart Dryburgh
- Edited by: Veronika Jenet
- Music by: Michael Nyman
- Production companies: Jan Chapman Productions; CiBy 2000
- Distributed by: BAC Films (France); Miramax Films (Australia and New Zealand; through Buena Vista International and Roadshow Film Distributors)
- Release dates: 15 May 1993 (Cannes); 19 May 1993 (France); 5 August 1993 (Australia)
- Running time: 117 minutes
- Countries: New Zealand; Australia; France
- Languages: English; Māori; British Sign Language
- Budget: US$7 million
- Box office: US$140 million

The Piano is a 1993 historical romance film written and directed by Jane Campion. It stars Holly Hunter, Harvey Keitel, Sam Neill, and Anna Paquin in her first major acting role. The film focuses on a mute Scottish woman who travels to a remote part of New Zealand with her young daughter after her arranged marriage to a settler. The plot has similarities to Jane Mander's 1920 novel, The Story of a New Zealand River, but also substantial differences. Campion has cited the novels Wuthering Heights and The African Queen as inspirations.

An international co-production between New Zealand, Australia and France, The Piano premiered at the 1993 Cannes Film Festival on May 15, 1993, where it won the Palme d'Or, (Note: Shared with Farewell My Concubine) rendering Campion the first female director to achieve that distinction (and as of 2026, one of the only three female directors to do so, along with Julia Ducournau for Titane and Justine Triet for Anatomy of a Fall). It was a commercial success, grossing US$140.2 million worldwide against its US$7 million budget. The film was also noted for its crossover appeal beyond the arthouse circuit in attracting mainstream popularity, largely due to rave reviews and word of mouth.

The Piano earned numerous accolades, including three Academy Awards (for Hunter as Best Actress, Paquin as Best Supporting Actress, and Campion for Best Original Screenplay), a WGA Award, a Golden Globe Award, three BAFTA Awards, and eleven Australian Film Institute Awards.

== Plot ==
Ada McGrath, a Scottish woman with elective mutism, travels to colonial New Zealand in the mid-19th century with her daughter Flora for an arranged marriage to settler Alisdair Stewart. It is not known why Ada has not spoken since the age of six, and the identity of Flora's father also remains a mystery. Ada communicates through playing the piano and sign language, with Flora acting as her interpreter.

After Ada and Flora are stranded on a New Zealand beach with their handcrafted piano, Alisdair arrives with his Māori crew, accompanied by Alisdair's neighbour George Baines, a retired sailor who has adopted Māori customs and facial tattoos. Alisdair says his crew isn't large enough to take the piano and he refuses to go back for it, claiming that they all need to make sacrifices. George, entranced by Ada's piano playing, agrees to help. He offers Alisdair the land he has been coveting in exchange for the piano and lessons from Ada. Alisdair agrees, oblivious to George's attraction to Ada. Ada is enraged by George's proposition but agrees to trade lessons for piano keys. She restricts the lessons to the black keys only and tries to resist George's persistent sexual overtures. Ada rejects Alisdair's physical advances and explorers her sensuality with George. George realizes Ada will never commit to him emotionally and returns the piano to her. Ada reconciles with George, and Alisdair eavedrops on their sexual encounter. He tries to force himself on Ada after confronting her, and demands she no longer see George.

Ada instructs Flora to deliver a piano key with an engraved declaration of love on it to George. Flora delivers it to Alisdair instead. Alisdair cuts off Ada's index finger in revenge, depriving her of the ability to play the piano, and sends the severed finger to George as a warning to stay away. While touching Ada as she sleeps, Alisdair hears her voice in his head, asking him to let George take her away. He confronts George in his home and asks if Ada has ever spoken to him. George says no.

George and Ada depart together with their belongings. As they row on a Māori canoe toward a ship, Ada asks George to throw the piano overboard. She allows her leg to become entangled in the rope and is dragged underwater with it, intending to drown herself. As she sinks, she changes her mind and struggles free, returning to the surface.

The epilogue describes Ada's new life with George and Flora in Nelson, where she gives piano lessons. George has made her a metal finger, and Ada has been taking speech lessons. She sometimes dreams of still being tethered to the piano resting at the bottom of the ocean.

== Cast ==
- Holly Hunter as Ada McGrath
- Harvey Keitel as George Baines
- Sam Neill as Alisdair Stewart
- Anna Paquin as Flora McGrath
- Kerry Walker as Aunt Morag
- Genevieve Lemon as Nessie
- Tungia Baker as Hira
- Ian Mune as the Reverend
- Peter Dennett as the head seaman
- Cliff Curtis as Mana
- Pete Smith as Hone
- Te Whatanui Skipwith as Chief Nihe
- Mere Boynton as Nihe's daughter
- George Boyle as Ada's father
- Rose McIver as Angel
- Mika Haka as Tahu
- Gordon Hatfield as Te Kori
- Bruce Allpress as the blind piano tuner
- Stephen Papps as Bluebeard

== Production ==
The film was originally titled The Piano Lesson, but the filmmakers could not obtain the rights to use the title because of the American play of the same name, and it was changed to The Piano.

Casting the role of Ada was a difficult process. Sigourney Weaver was Jane Campion's first choice, but she was not interested. Jennifer Jason Leigh was also considered, but had a conflict with her commitment to Rush (1991). Isabelle Huppert met with Campion and had vintage period-style photographs taken of her as Ada, and later said she regretted not fighting for the role as Holly Hunter did.

The casting for Flora occurred after Hunter had been selected for the part. They did a series of open auditions for girls age 9 to 13, focusing on girls who were small enough to be believable as Ada's daughter (as Hunter is relatively short at 157 cm; 5 ft 2 in tall). Anna Paquin ended up winning the role of Flora over 5,000 other girls.

Hunter collaborated extensively with Pierce College sign language instructor Darlene Allen Wittman, blending American, British, Russian, Plains Indian, as well as some unique new signs into an amalgamated sign language for her character Ada. Hunter also took piano lessons to authentically play the compositions that Michael Nyman wrote for the film.

Alistair Fox has argued that The Piano was significantly influenced by Jane Mander's The Story of a New Zealand River. Robert Macklin, an associate editor with The Canberra Times newspaper, has also written about the similarities. The film also serves as a retelling of the fairytale "Bluebeard", itself depicted as a scene in the Christmas pageant. Campion has cited the novels Wuthering Heights and The African Queen as inspirations.

In July 2013, Campion revealed that she originally intended that the main character would drown in the sea after going overboard after her piano.

Principal photography took place over 12 weeks from February to mid-May 1992. The Piano was filmed in New Zealand's North Island. The scene where Ada comes ashore and the piano is abandoned was filmed at Karekare Beach, west of Auckland. Bush scenes were filmed near Matakana and Awakino, while underwater scenes were filmed at the Bay of Islands.

Campion was determined to market the film to appeal to a larger audience than the limited audiences many art films attracted at the time. Simona Benzakein, the publicist for The Piano at Cannes noted: "Jane and I discussed the marketing. She wanted this to be not just an elite film, but a popular film."

== Reception ==
=== Critical reception ===
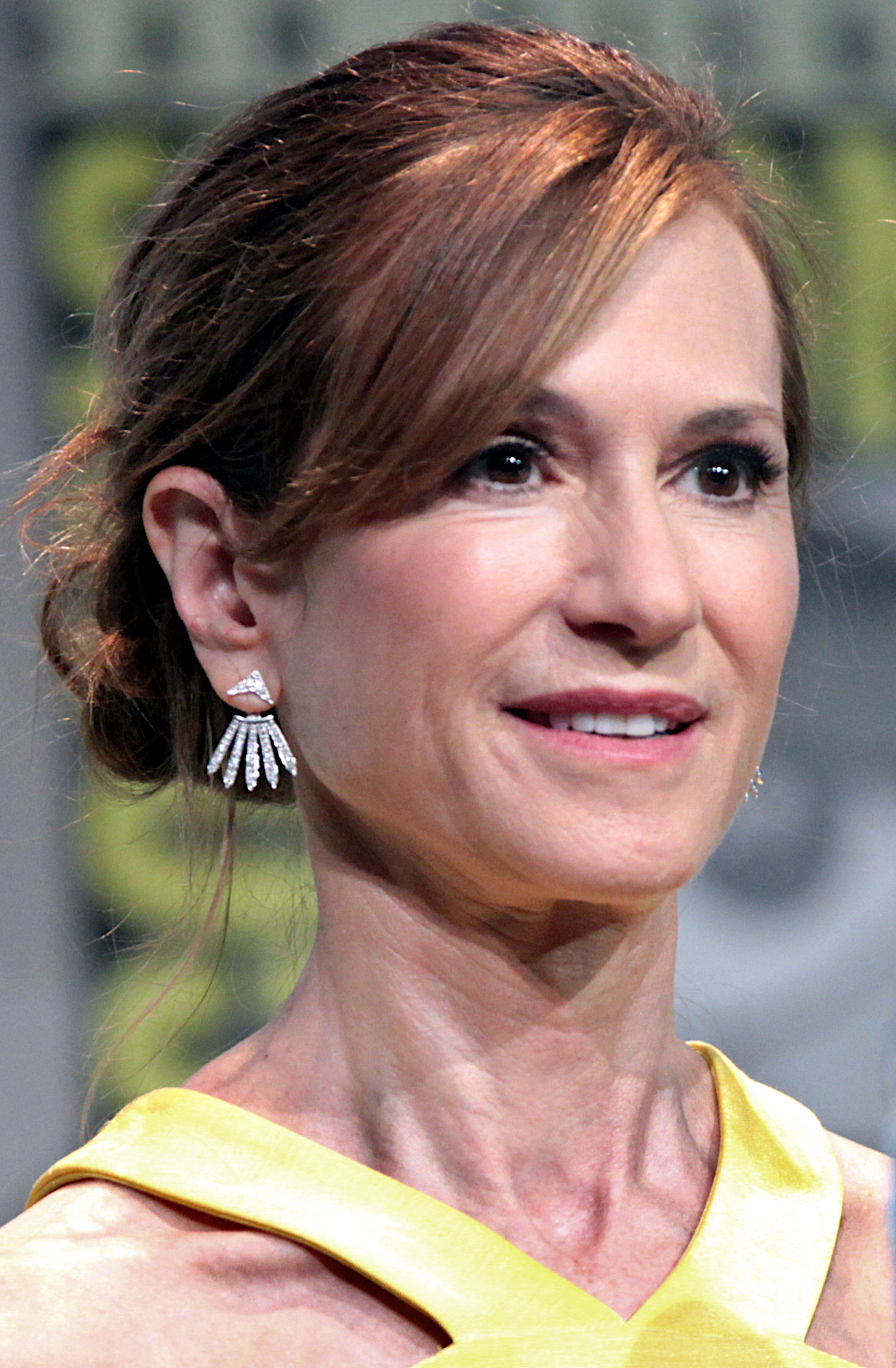
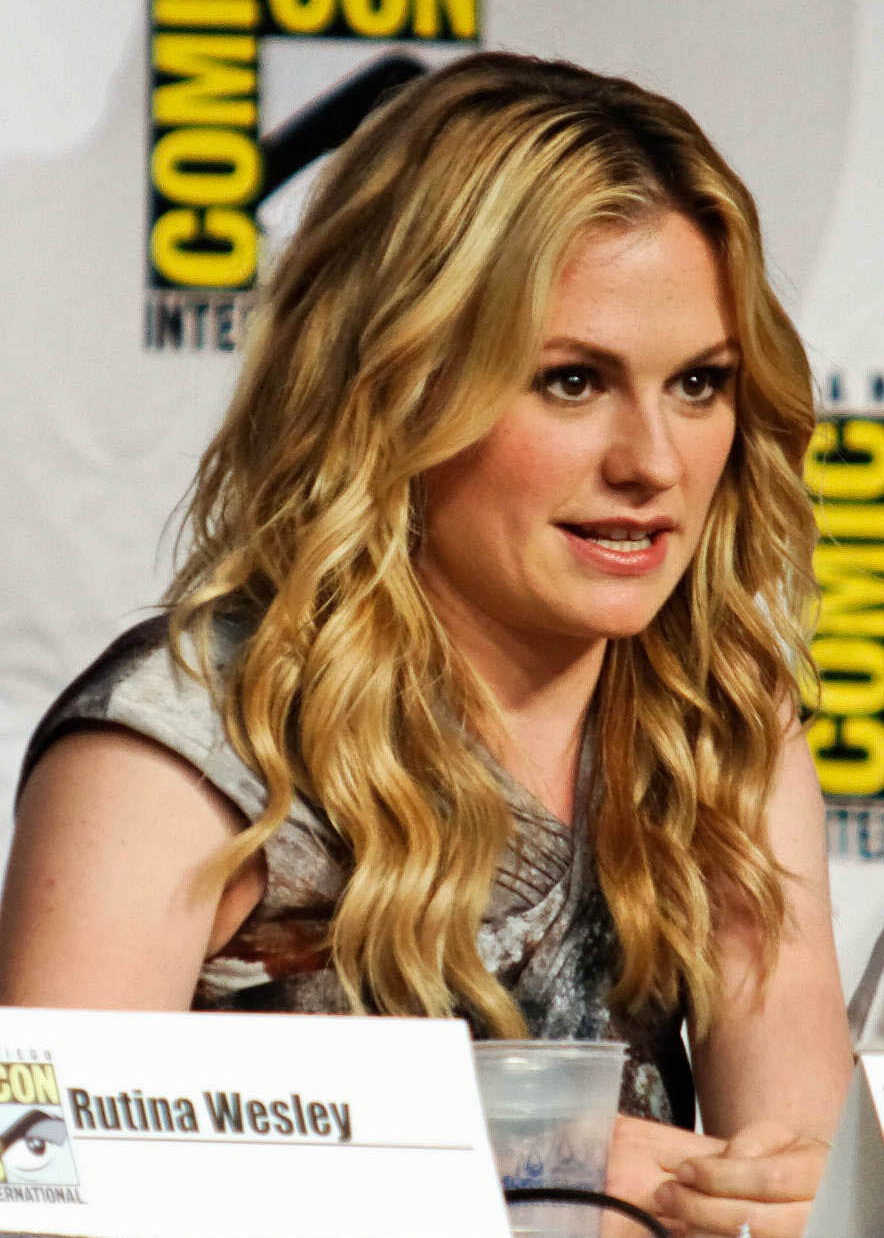
The performances of Holly Hunter and Anna Paquin garnered widespread critical acclaim, earning them Academy Award for Best Actress and Best Supporting Actress respectively.

Reviews for the film were overwhelmingly positive. Roger Ebert gave the film 4 out of 4 stars and wrote: "The Piano is as peculiar and haunting as any film I've seen" and "it is one of those rare movies that is not just about a story, or some characters, but about a whole universe of feeling". Hal Hinson of The Washington Post called it an "evocative, powerful, extraordinarily beautiful film".

The Piano was named one of the best films of 1993 by 86 film critics, making it the most acclaimed film of 1993. The website They Shoot Pictures, Don't They, which aggregates thousands of polls to determine the best films of all time, ranked The Piano as the best film of 1993, ahead of Schindler's List.

In his 2013 Movie Guide, Leonard Maltin gave the film three and half out of four stars, calling the film a "haunting, unpredictable tale of love and sex told from a woman's point of view" and went on to say "writer-director Campion has fashioned a highly original fable, showing the tragedy and triumph erotic passion can bring to one's daily life".

On review aggregator website Rotten Tomatoes, the film holds an approval rating of 90% based on 73 reviews, and an average rating of 8.7/10. The website's critical consensus reads: "Powered by Holly Hunter's main performance, The Piano is a truth-seeking romance played in the key of erotic passion." On Metacritic, the film has a weighted average score of 89 out of 100, based on 20 critics, indicating "universal acclaim".

In the 2022 Sight and Sound critic's poll to determine the greatest films of all time, The Piano was placed at 50th place, tying with The 400 Blows.

=== Box office ===
In New Zealand, the film became the highest-grossing domestically produced film of all time, surpassing Footrot Flats: The Dog's Tale (1986) with a gross of $NZ3.8 million.

It grossed over US$140 million worldwide (equivalent to $312.5 million in 2025), including $7 million in Australia, $16 million in France, and $39 million in the United States and Canada against its US$7 million budget (equivalent to $15.6 million in 2025).

The film would be later re-released in the Asia Pacific region and the United States in 4K cinematography in July 2026, earning at least $41,000 worldwide in a limited number of movie theaters in the United States and Australia as of 6 August 2026.

=== Accolades ===
The film was nominated for eight Academy Awards (including Best Picture), winning three for Best Actress (Holly Hunter), Best Supporting Actress (Anna Paquin) and Best Original Screenplay (Jane Campion). At age 11, Anna Paquin became the second youngest competitive Academy Award winner (after Tatum O'Neal in 1973).

At the Cannes Film Festival, the film won the Palme d'Or (sharing with Chen Kaige's Farewell My Concubine), with Campion becoming the first woman to win the honour, as well as the first filmmaker from New Zealand to achieve this. Holly Hunter also won Best Actress.

In 2019, the BBC polled 368 film experts from 84 countries to name the 100 best films by women directors, and The Piano was named the top film, with nearly 10% of the critics polled giving it first place on their ballots.

In 2026, Jane Campion acknowledged that disgraced former Miramax head Harvey Weinstein led a "brilliant" campaign which greatly aided the film winning numerous awards.

Award	Category	Nominee(s)	Result	Ref.
Academy Awards	Best Picture	Jan Chapman	Nominated	
Academy Awards	Best Director	Jane Campion	Nominated	
Academy Awards	Best Actress	Holly Hunter	Won	
Academy Awards	Best Supporting Actress	Anna Paquin	Won	
Academy Awards	Best Screenplay – Written Directly for the Screen	Jane Campion	Won	
Academy Awards	Best Cinematography	Stuart Dryburgh	Nominated	
Academy Awards	Best Costume Design	Janet Patterson	Nominated	
Academy Awards	Best Film Editing	Veronika Jenet	Nominated	
American Cinema Editors Awards	Best Edited Feature Film	Veronika Jenet	Nominated	
American Society of Cinematographers Awards	Outstanding Achievement in Cinematography in Theatrical Releases	Stuart Dryburgh	Nominated	
Argentine Film Critics Association Awards	Best Foreign Film	Jane Campion	Won	
Australian Film Institute Awards	Best Film	Jan Chapman	Won	
Australian Film Institute Awards	Best Direction	Jane Campion	Won	
Australian Film Institute Awards	Best Actor in a Leading Role	Harvey Keitel	Won	
Australian Film Institute Awards	Best Actress in a Leading Role	Holly Hunter	Won	
Australian Film Institute Awards	Best Actor in a Supporting Role	Sam Neill	Nominated	
Australian Film Institute Awards	Best Actress in a Supporting Role	Kerry Walker	Nominated	
Australian Film Institute Awards	Best Original Screenplay	Jane Campion	Won	
Australian Film Institute Awards	Best Cinematography	Stuart Dryburgh	Won	
Australian Film Institute Awards	Best Costume Design	Janet Patterson	Won	
Australian Film Institute Awards	Best Editing	Veronika Jenet	Won	
Australian Film Institute Awards	Best Original Music Score	Michael Nyman	Won	
Australian Film Institute Awards	Best Production Design	Andrew McAlpine	Won	
Australian Film Institute Awards	Best Sound	Lee Smith, Tony Johnson, Gethin Creagh, Peter Townsend, and Annabelle Sheehan	Won	
Bodil Awards	Best Non-American Film	Jane Campion	Won	
Boston Society of Film Critics Awards	Best Actress	Holly Hunter	Won	
British Academy Film Awards	Best Film	Jan Chapman and Jane Campion	Nominated	
British Academy Film Awards	Best Direction	Jane Campion	Nominated	
British Academy Film Awards	Best Actress in a Leading Role	Holly Hunter	Won	
British Academy Film Awards	Best Original Screenplay	Jane Campion	Nominated	
British Academy Film Awards	Best Cinematography	Stuart Dryburgh	Nominated	
British Academy Film Awards	Best Costume Design	Janet Patterson	Won	
British Academy Film Awards	Best Editing	Veronika Jenet	Nominated	
British Academy Film Awards	Best Production Design	Andrew McAlpine	Won	
British Academy Film Awards	Best Score for a Film	Michael Nyman	Nominated	
British Academy Film Awards	Best Sound	Lee Smith, Tony Johnson, and Gethin Creagh	Nominated	
British Society of Cinematographers Awards	Best Cinematography in a Theatrical Feature Film	Stuart Dryburgh	Nominated	
Camerimage	Golden Frog (Main Competition)	Stuart Dryburgh	Won	
Cannes Film Festival	Palme d'Or	Jane Campion	Won	
Cannes Film Festival	Best Actress	Holly Hunter	Won	
César Awards	Best Foreign Film	Jane Campion	Won	
Chicago Film Critics Association Awards	Best Film		Nominated	
Chicago Film Critics Association Awards	Best Foreign Language Film		Won	
Chicago Film Critics Association Awards	Best Director	Jane Campion	Nominated	
Chicago Film Critics Association Awards	Best Actress	Holly Hunter	Won	
Chicago Film Critics Association Awards	Best Supporting Actress	Anna Paquin	Nominated	
Chicago Film Critics Association Awards	Best Screenplay	Jane Campion	Nominated	
Chicago Film Critics Association Awards	Best Original Score	Michael Nyman	Won	
Dallas–Fort Worth Film Critics Association Awards	Best Film		Nominated	
Dallas–Fort Worth Film Critics Association Awards	Best Director	Jane Campion	Nominated	
Dallas–Fort Worth Film Critics Association Awards	Best Actress	Holly Hunter	Won	
David di Donatello Awards	Best Foreign Actress	Holly Hunter	Nominated	
Directors Guild of America Awards	Outstanding Directorial Achievement in Motion Pictures	Jane Campion	Nominated	
Film Critics Circle of Australia Awards	Best Director	Jane Campion	Won	
Film Critics Circle of Australia Awards	Best Supporting Actor – Female	Anna Paquin	Won	
Film Critics Circle of Australia Awards	Best Screenplay	Jane Campion	Won	
Film Critics Circle of Australia Awards	Best Musical Score	Michael Nyman	Won	
Golden Globe Awards	Best Motion Picture – Drama		Nominated	
Golden Globe Awards	Best Actress in a Motion Picture – Drama	Holly Hunter	Won	
Golden Globe Awards	Best Supporting Actress – Motion Picture	Anna Paquin	Nominated	
Golden Globe Awards	Best Director – Motion Picture	Jane Campion	Nominated	
Golden Globe Awards	Best Screenplay – Motion Picture	Jane Campion	Nominated	
Golden Globe Awards	Best Original Score – Motion Picture	Michael Nyman	Nominated	
Golden Reel Awards	Best Sound Editing – Foreign Feature	Martin Oswin	Won	
Guldbagge Awards	Best Foreign Film		Won	
Independent Spirit Awards	Best International Film		Won	
Japan Academy Film Prize	Outstanding Foreign Language Film		Nominated	
Kinema Junpo Awards	Best Foreign Language Film	Jane Campion	Won	
London Film Critics Circle Awards	Film of the Year		Won	
London Film Critics Circle Awards	Actress of the Year	Holly Hunter	Won	
Los Angeles Film Critics Association Awards	Best Picture		Runner-up	
Los Angeles Film Critics Association Awards	Best Director	Jane Campion	Won	
Los Angeles Film Critics Association Awards	Best Actress	Holly Hunter	Won	
Los Angeles Film Critics Association Awards	Best Supporting Actress	Anna Paquin	Won (Note: Shared with Rosie Perez for Fearless.)	
Los Angeles Film Critics Association Awards	Best Screenplay	Jane Campion	Won	
Los Angeles Film Critics Association Awards	Best Cinematography	Stuart Dryburgh	Won (Note: Shared with Janusz Kamiński for Schindler's List.)	
Los Angeles Film Critics Association Awards	Best Music Score	Michael Nyman	Runner-up	
Nastro d'Argento	Best Foreign Director	Jane Campion	Nominated	
National Board of Review Awards	Top Ten Films		4th Place	
National Board of Review Awards	Best Actress	Holly Hunter	Won	
National Society of Film Critics Awards	Best Film		2nd Place	
National Society of Film Critics Awards	Best Director	Jane Campion	2nd Place	
National Society of Film Critics Awards	Best Actress	Holly Hunter	Won	
National Society of Film Critics Awards	Best Supporting Actress	Anna Paquin	3rd Place	
National Society of Film Critics Awards	Best Screenplay	Jane Campion	Won	
National Society of Film Critics Awards	Best Cinematography	Stuart Dryburgh	2nd Place	
New York Film Critics Circle Awards	Best Film		Runner-up	
New York Film Critics Circle Awards	Best Director	Jane Campion	Won	
New York Film Critics Circle Awards	Best Actress	Holly Hunter	Won	
New York Film Critics Circle Awards	Best Screenplay	Jane Campion	Won	
New York Film Critics Circle Awards	Best Cinematographer	Stuart Dryburgh	Runner-up	
Political Film Society Awards	Democracy		Nominated	
Producers Guild of America Awards	Outstanding Producer of Theatrical Motion Pictures	Jan Chapman	Nominated	
Producers Guild of America Awards	Most Promising Producer in Theatrical Motion Pictures	Jan Chapman	Won	
Robert Awards	Best Foreign Film	Jane Campion	Won	
Southeastern Film Critics Association Awards	Best Picture	Jan Chapman	Won	
Southeastern Film Critics Association Awards	Top Ten Films		Won	
Southeastern Film Critics Association Awards	Best Director	Jane Campion	Won	
Southeastern Film Critics Association Awards	Best Actress	Holly Hunter	Won	
Turkish Film Critics Association Awards	Best Foreign Film		Won	
Vancouver International Film Festival	Most Popular International Film	Jane Campion	Won	
Writers Guild of America Awards	Best Screenplay – Written Directly for the Screen	Jane Campion	Won	

== Soundtrack ==
"The Piano"
Extract from the score of the 1993 film The Piano

The score for the film was written by Michael Nyman, and included the acclaimed piece "The Heart Asks Pleasure First"; additional pieces were "Big My Secret", "The Mood That Passes Through You", "Silver Fingered Fling", "Deep Sleep Playing" and "The Attraction of the Pedalling Ankle". This album is rated in the top 100 soundtrack albums of all time and Nyman's work is regarded as a key voice in the film, which has a mute lead character. The main musical score "The Heart Asks Pleasure First" is based on the traditional Scottish song "Gloomy Winter's Noo Awa'".

== Home media ==
The film was released on VHS on May 25, 1994. Initial fears in leadup to its release were in relation to the films status as "arty" and "non-mainstream"; however, its nominations and success at the Academy Awards assisted its profitability in the home video market. It finished in the top 30 video rentals of 1994 in the United States. It was released on DVD in 1997 by Live Entertainment. It was released on Blu-ray in Australia in 2010, and in the United States by Lionsgate on 31 January 2012.

The film was released on Ultra HD Blu-ray and a remastered Blu-ray by The Criterion Collection on January 25, 2022, as part of its first six-film slate of 4K releases.

== See also ==
- List of films considered the best
