= The Story of a New Zealand River =

1920 novel by Jane Mander

The Story of a New Zealand River is a 1920 novel by Jane Mander. A romance novel, it deals with the clash between puritanism and pioneering values in early twentieth-century New Zealand society.

Cover of the first edition of The Story of a New Zealand River.

== Plot ==
An upper-class Englishwoman has to adjust to living in an isolated timber-mill settlement.

== Development and publication history ==
Mander began writing The Story of a New Zealand River while working in Australia, finishing it in New Zealand in 1912. After being rejected by four London publishers, Mander rewrote the manuscript while studying in the United States in 1915. It was rejected again by Dodd, Mead & Co., before being accepted by John Lane in 1918. After being delayed by strikes, the first American edition was published in 1920, and rapidly sold out. An English edition followed later that year.

After being out of print for many years the book was reissued by Whitcombe & Tombs in 1938, and again in 1961 and 1973. In 1952 it was adapted for radio by Oliver Gillespie.

== Reception ==
The Story of a New Zealand River was well received in America and Australia. It received positive reviews in the New York press, and was called "the best novel which has yet come from our neighbouring Dominion" by the Sydney Mail. It was praised by New Zealand reviewers for its depiction of "vivid human reality" and the clash of the "settled and polished life" with the "crudities and rough strength of a pioneer's world". A decade later, it was recognised as an outstanding New Zealand novel, and listed among examples of classic New Zealand literature.

Joan Stevens, in her The New Zealand Novel 1860-1965, praises it for its interpretation of the New Zealand setting.

Alistair Fox has argued that The Story of a New Zealand River was a significant influence on the film The Piano (1993) by Jane Campion.
