= Jane Mander =

New Zealand writer (1877–1949)

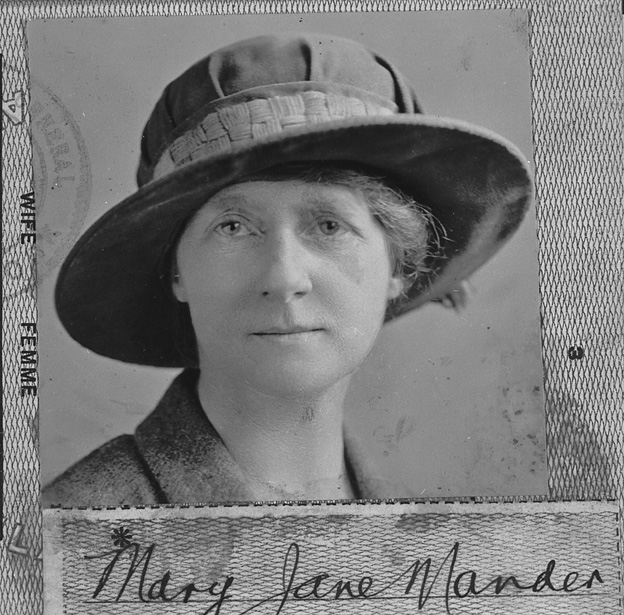
- Jane Mander in 1923
- Born: 9 April 1877; Ramarama, New Zealand
- Died: 20 December 1949 (aged 72); Whangārei, New Zealand
- Occupations: novelist, essayist, journalist
- Relatives: The Hon. Francis Mander (father); Mander family
- Writing career
- Period: 1920—1928
- Genre: fiction
- Subject: New Zealand

Mary Jane Mander (9 April 1877 – 20 December 1949) was a New Zealand novelist and journalist.

== Early life ==
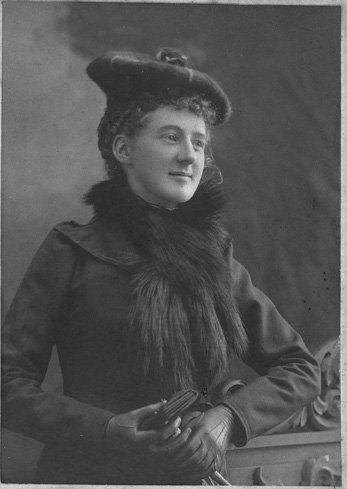
Jane Mander in the 1890s

Born in the small community of Ramarama south of Auckland, she had little schooling, yet was teaching at primary school while being tutored for a high school education. Her father, the Hon. Francis Mander, was member for the Marsden electorate in the Parliament of New Zealand and of the Legislative Council, and a descendant of the Mander family of Midland England. He was a pioneer sawmiller and later purchased The Northern Advocate newspaper where she honed her skills as a journalist.

Mander became editor of the Dargaville North Auckland Times in 1907. In 1910 she went to Sydney, where she met and became friends with William Holman, who later become Premier of New South Wales. While there she worked as a freelance journalist, submitting articles to the Maoriland Worker under the pseudonym Manda Lloyd.

In 1912 she moved to New York City to study at Columbia University, where she excelled in studies despite having numerous part-time jobs. Her poor health forced her to abandon studying after just three years. She joined the suffrage movement in New York, campaigning for the state referendum on women's franchise. She worked for the Red Cross when the United States entered World War I.

== Novelist ==
During this time she also worked on her most well-known and highly praised novel The Story of a New Zealand River (1920), which tells the story of an Englishwoman who has to adjust to living in an isolated timber-mill settlement. Despite being popular in both the U.S. and the United Kingdom, it received a somewhat hostile response back in New Zealand, where critics disapproved of the novel's unconventional themes. They also took offence at her alteration of geography and population to suit the story. Alistair Fox has argued that The Story of a New Zealand River was a significant influence on the film The Piano (1993) by Jane Campion.

Her next two novels, The Passionate Puritan (1921) and the less popular The Strange Attraction (1922) were both based around her childhood experiences in New Zealand.

In 1923 Mander moved to London and worked for the Harrison Press of Paris. She wrote numerous essays and short stories, and acted as a London correspondent for multiple New Zealand newspapers. Her next novel, Allen Adair (1925), was the last set in New Zealand, based around the kauri gum-digging industry. It centred on the hero's struggle against the middle-class aspirations of his family. Her next two novels, The Besieging City (1926) and Pins and Pinnacles (1928), were set in New York and Paris respectively. She also completed another novel, but had it destroyed after it was rejected by a publisher.

Her health failing, she returned to New Zealand in 1932 where she looked after her elderly father. She attempted to write her seventh novel but only managed a few articles and reviews until her death in Whangārei in 1949 at the age of 72.

There is a substantial Jane Mander collection held at Auckland Libraries. In March 1937 Mander gave hand-corrected typescripts of four of her novels - The strange attraction, Allen Adair, The besieging city and Pins and pinnacles - to the Library. At the same time, she also donated copies of the first edition of her earliest and most famous novel, The story of a New Zealand river. In the early 1970s Dorothea Turner arranged donations of personal papers, travel documents, radio talks and newspaper and magazine clippings (including otherwise hard-to-locate short stories) from Mander's sister, Amy Cross.

== Bibliography ==
- Maoriland Worker articles under the pseudonym of ‘Manda Lloyd’ (1910)
- The Story of a New Zealand River (1920)
- The Passionate Puritan (1921)
- The Strange Attraction (1922)
- Allen Adair (1925)
- The Besieging City (1926)
- Pins and Pinnacles (1928)
