= Paratahi Island =

Island in New Zealand

Native name: Paratahi
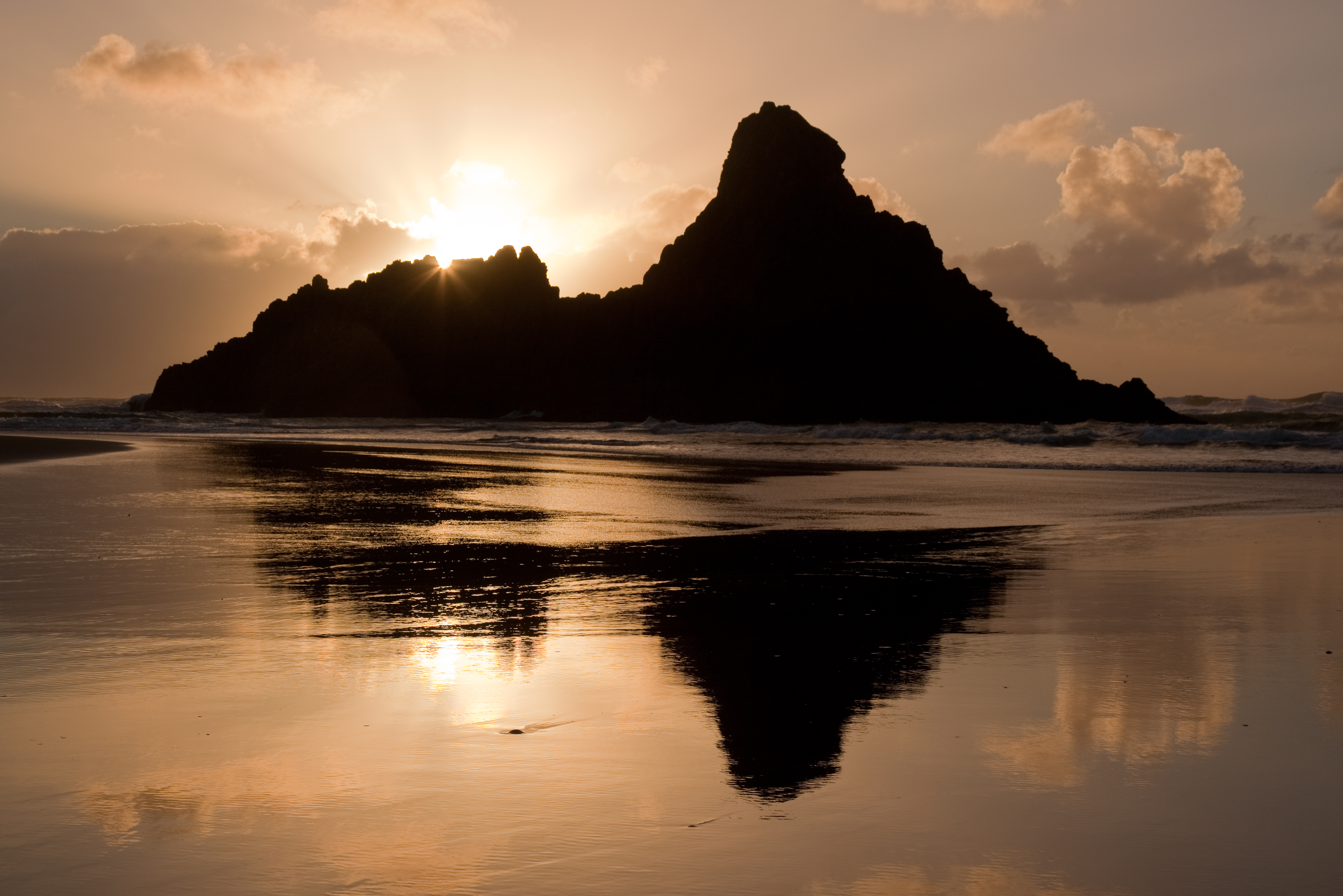
- Paratahi Island seen from Karekare Beach
- Interactive map of Paratahi Island

Geography
- Location: Karekare
- Coordinates: 36.994729°S 174.470484°E
- Adjacent to: Tasman Sea
- Area: 2,700 m^{2} (29,000 sq ft)
- Length: 115 m (377 ft)
- Width: 40 m (130 ft)
- Highest elevation: 20 m (70 ft)

Administration
- New Zealand

Paratahi Island is an island on the west coast of the Auckland Region, New Zealand, located at Karekare. By the late 1990s, northward moving sand dunes had linked the island to the mainland. Paratahi Island is a nesting spot for white-fronted terns, red-billed gulls and a location where New Zealand fur seals are known to visit.

== Geography ==
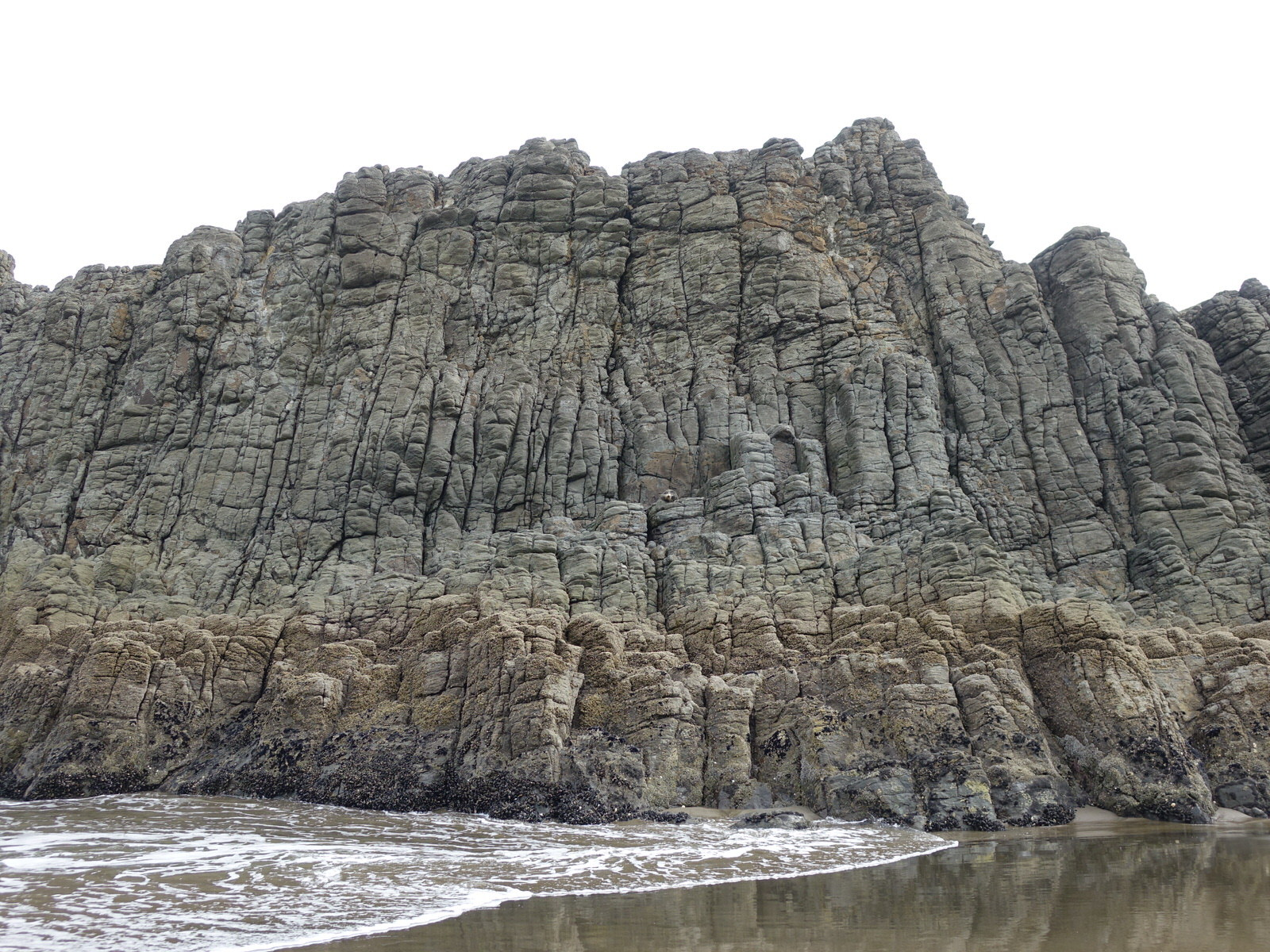
Paratahi Island is primarily formed from columnar jointed dacite

Paratahi Island is located off the west coast of the Auckland Region near Karekare, approximately 370 metres (1,210 ft) southwest of Karekare Point. The island is separated in half by a saddle, with a significantly taller 20 m (66 ft) summit on the northern side of the island. The upper portions of the island are vegetated on the eastern side, but less vegetated on the western side that faces the Tasman Sea.

The island was previously separated from the mainland by a channel. Sand moving northwards from Whatipu turned Paratahi Island into a tied island by the late 1990s.

The island is formed from Columnar jointed dacite of volcanic origin.

== Biodiversity ==
Much of the island is vegetated by taupata (Coprosma repens), alongside mats of Disphyma australe in the understory. The island is a nesting spot for white-fronted terns and red-billed gulls, and is a habitat for the native earwig species Anisolabis littorea. The island was previous populated by New Zealand fur seals up until the early 20th century. In 2012, small numbers of fur seals were reported to be present on the island.

== History ==
The traditional Te Kawerau ā Maki name for the island is Te Toka Pāoke ("The Rock That Wandered"), later being known by the name Paratahi ("The Sibling Who Stands Apart"). Until the 2015 Te Kawerau ā Maki Treaty of Waitangi settlement, the island had been named Panatahi Island by the New Zealand Geographic Board.

== Gallery ==
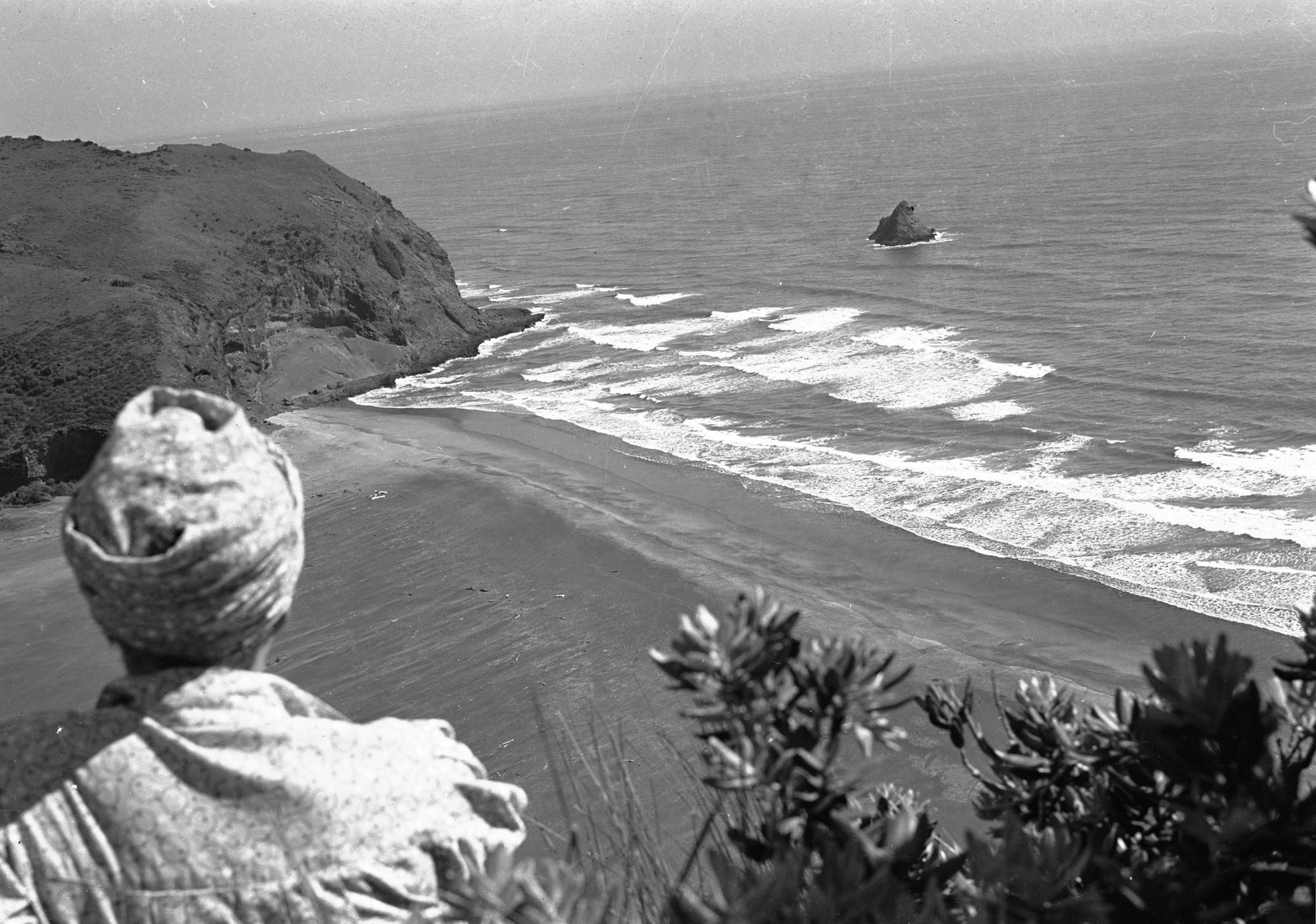
Paratahi Island in 1942, before it became a tied island

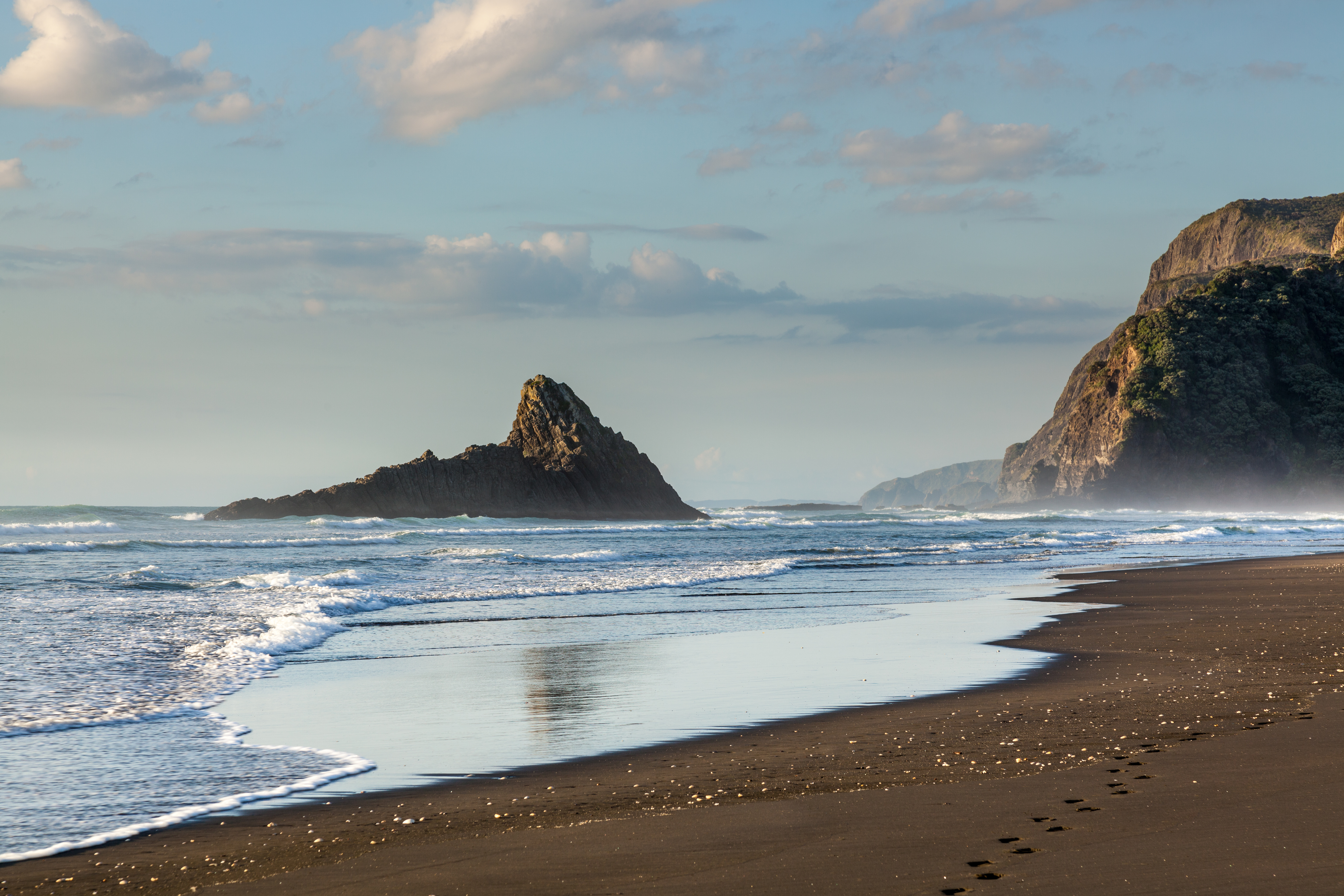
Paratahi Island seen from the south

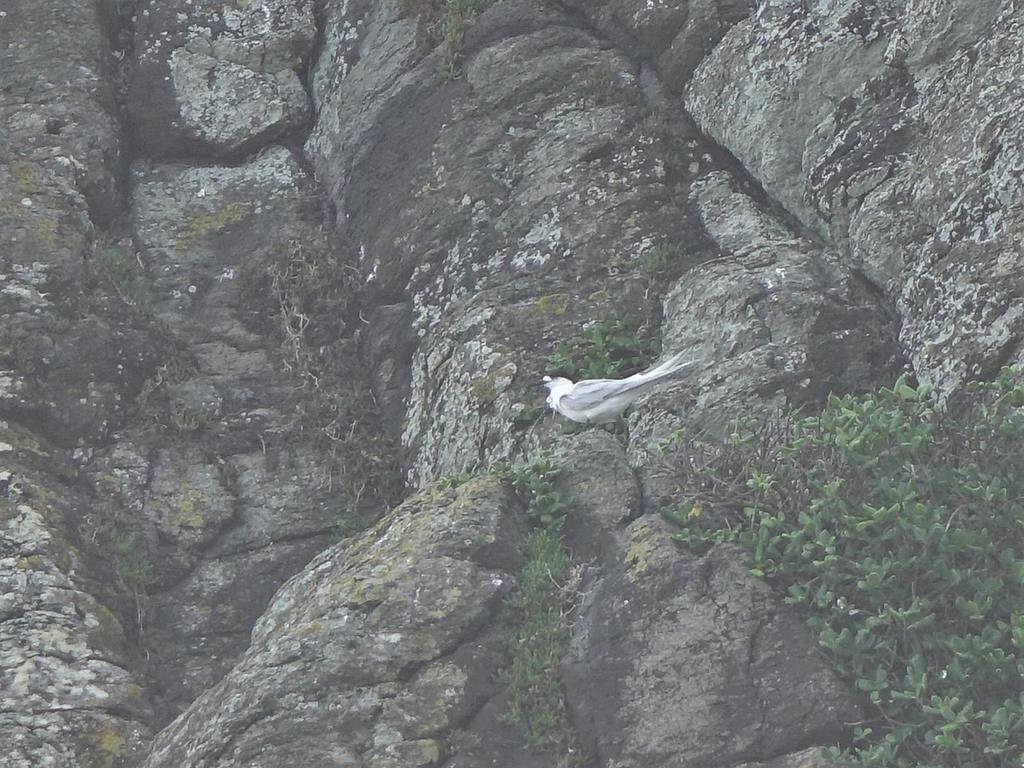
A white-fronted tern on Paratahi Island

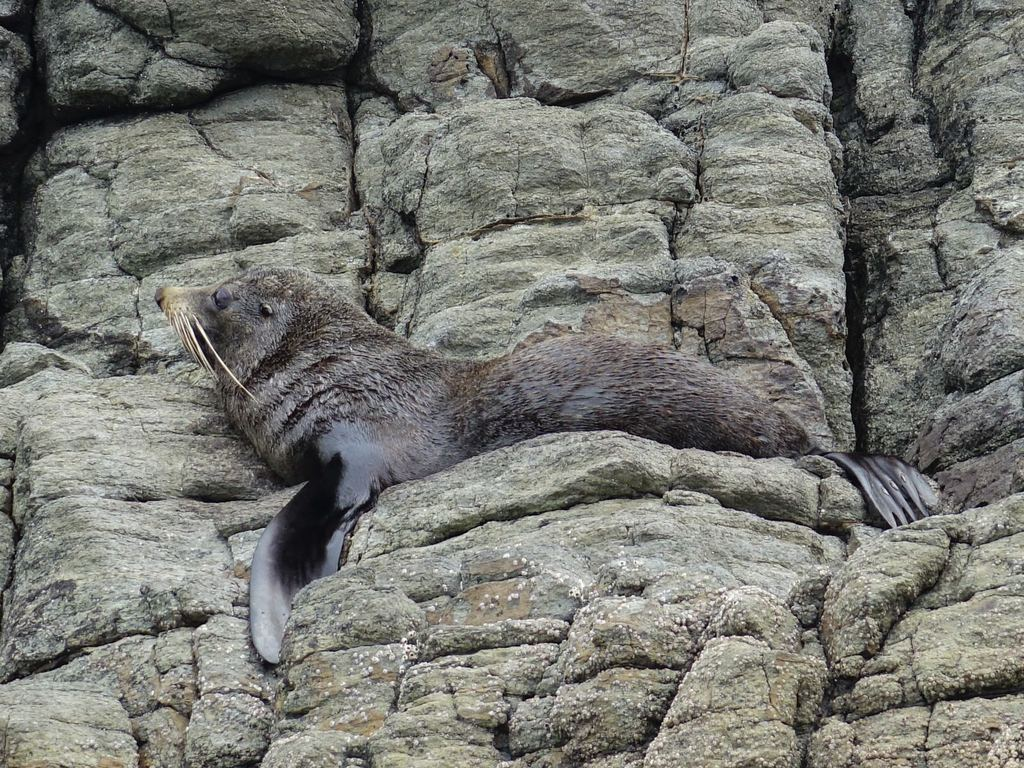
A New Zealand fur seal seen on Paratahi Island in 2016

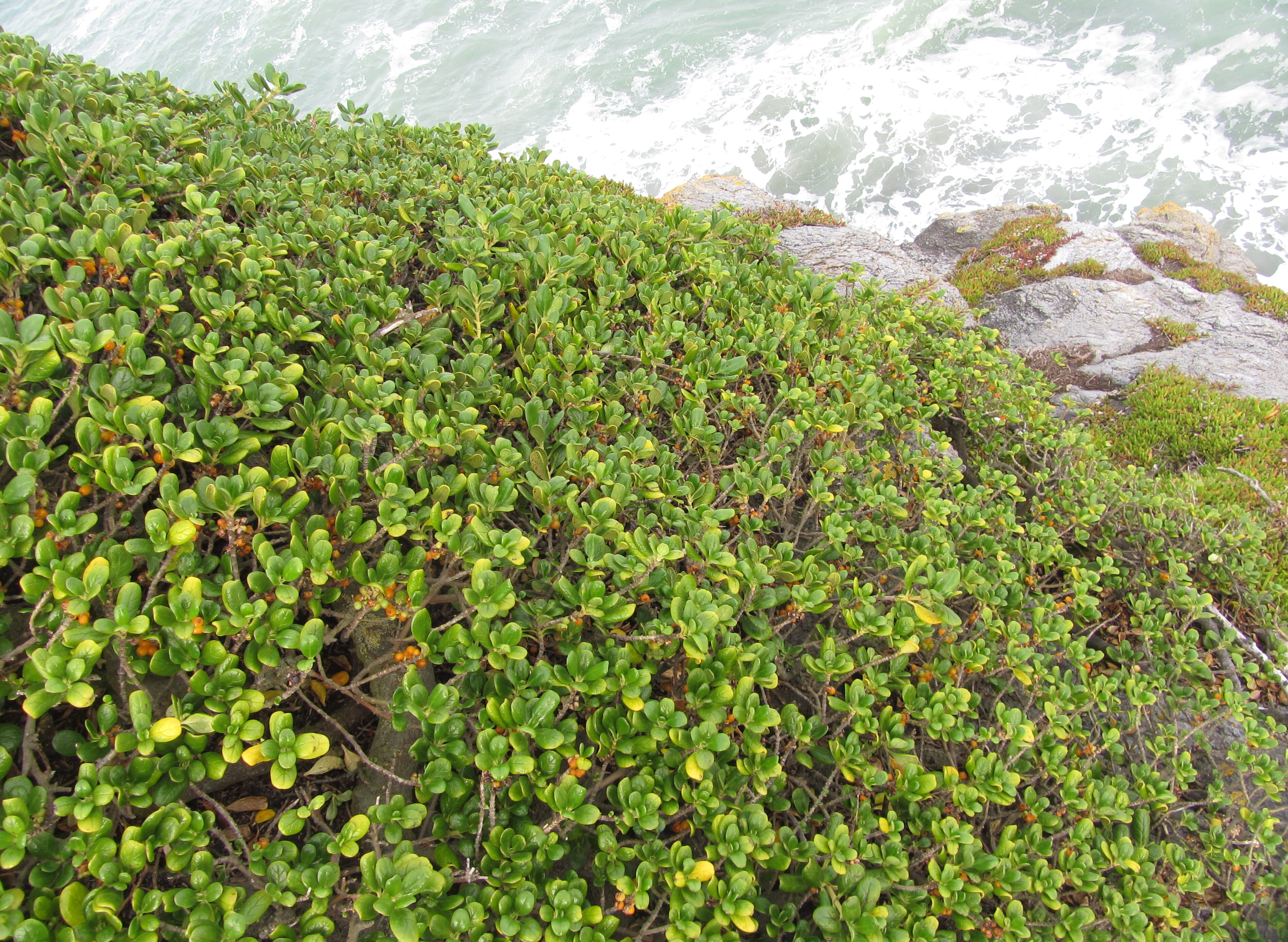
Taupara (Coprosma repens) growing on Paratahi Island
