= Fearless (1993 film) =

1993 American drama film by Peter Weir

- Theatrical release poster
- Directed by: Peter Weir
- Screenplay by: Rafael Yglesias
- Based on: Fearless by Rafael Yglesias
- Produced by: Paula Weinstein; Mark Rosenberg
- Starring: Jeff Bridges; Isabella Rossellini; Rosie Perez; Tom Hulce; John Turturro
- Cinematography: Allen Daviau
- Edited by: William M. Anderson; Armen Minasian; Lee Smith
- Music by: Maurice Jarre
- Distributed by: Warner Bros.
- Release date: October 15, 1993
- Running time: 122 minutes
- Country: United States
- Language: English
- Budget: $20 million
- Box office: $7 million

Fearless is a 1993 American drama film directed by Peter Weir and starring Jeff Bridges, Isabella Rossellini, Rosie Perez and John Turturro. It was written by Rafael Yglesias, adapted from his novel of the same name.

Rosie Perez was nominated for an Academy Award for Best Supporting Actress for her role as Carla Rodrigo. The film was also entered into the 44th Berlin International Film Festival. Jeff Bridges' role as Max Klein is widely regarded as one of the best performances of his career. The film's soundtrack features part of the first movement of Henryk Górecki's Symphony No. 3, subtitled Symphony of Sorrowful Songs. The film's screenwriter was inspired to write the script after he was in a car accident. Yglesias began writing the story after reading about United Airlines Flight 232, that crashed in Sioux City, Iowa, in 1989. The film received positive reviews from critics but was a box office failure, grossing only $7 million against a budget of $20 million.

== Plot ==
Max Klein survives an airline crash. The plane plummets, but he is strangely calm. This calm enables him to dispel fear in the flight cabin. He sits next to Byron Hummel, a young boy flying alone. Flight attendants move through the cabin, telling another passenger, Carla Rodrigo, traveling with an infant, to hold the child in her lap as the plane plummets out of control, while telling other passengers to buckle into their seats. Max was telling his business partner, Jeff Gordon, of his fear of flying as they took off.

In the aftermath of the crash, most passengers died. Among the few survivors, most are terribly injured but Max is unhurt. The crash site is chaotic, filled with first responders and other emergency personnel. Focusing on the survivors, a team of investigators from the FAA and the airline conduct interviews. Max is repelled by all the chaos and disgusted by the investigators wanting to interview him.

Max rents a car and starts driving home. Along the way, he visits his high school girlfriend Alison, whom he has not seen for 20 years. At the restaurant, Alison is surprised to see Max eating strawberries, as he is allergic to them. He grins, then finishes them without an allergic reaction.

The next morning, Max is accosted by FBI investigators. They question why he chose not to contact his family to tell them he is fine. The airline representative offers Max train tickets to return home, but he asks for airline tickets, as he no longer fears air travel. The airline books him on the flight. They seat him next to Dr. Bill Perlman, the airline's psychiatrist.

Dr. Perlman annoyingly tags behind Max back to his home, prodding him for information about the crash. Max snaps back at the psychiatrist rudely, to be rid of him. Max's wife Laura Klein notices his strange behavior and that he seems somehow changed. Max's late business partner's wife Nan Gordon asks about Jeff's last moments. Max says Jeff died in the crash.

The media call Max "The Good Samaritan" in news reports. The boy Max sat next to, Byron, publicly thanks him in television interviews. For the way he comforted passengers while the plane fell out of control during the crash, Max is considered a hero.

Max avoids the press and becomes distant from Laura and his son Jonah. His persona is radically changed, and he is preoccupied with his new perspective on life following the near-death experience. Max begins drawing abstract pictures of the crash. As he survived without injury, he thinks himself invulnerable to death.

Attorney Steven Brillstein encourages Max to exaggerate testimony, to maximize the settlement offer from the airline. He reluctantly agrees when he is confronted with Nan's financial predicament as a widow.

Cognitive dissonance spurs Max to a panic attack. He runs out of the office, to the roof of the building. He climbs onto the roof's edge. As Max stands on the ledge, looking down at the streets below, his panic subsides. He rejoices in fearlessness. Laura finds Max on the ledge. He is spinning on it, with his overcoat billowing across his face.

Because of his confidence, Dr. Perlman encourages Max to meet with fellow survivor Carla Rodrigo, whose infant was held in her lap while the plane fell. She struggles with survivor's guilt, and is traumatized for not holding onto him tightly enough, although she was following the flight attendant's instructions.

Max and Carla develop a close friendship. He helps her to get past the trauma, to free herself from guilt, deliberately crashing his car to show that it was physically impossible for any person to hold onto anything due to the forces of the crash.

Brillstein arrives at the Kleins' to celebrate the airline's settlement offer, bringing a fruit basket. Max eats one of the strawberries. This time he experiences an allergic reaction. Max is resuscitated by Laura and survives. He recovers his emotional connection to his family, to the world and to the reality of yet another chance at life.

== Cast ==
- Jeff Bridges as Max Klein
- Isabella Rossellini as Laura Klein
- Rosie Perez as Carla Rodrigo
- Tom Hulce as Steven Brillstein
- John Turturro as Dr. Bill Perlman
- Benicio del Toro as Manny Rodrigo
- Deirdre O'Connell as Nan Gordon
- John de Lancie as Jeff Gordon
- Spencer Vrooman as Jonah Klein
- Robin Pearson Rose as Sarah
- Debra Monk as Alison
- Kathryn Rossetter as Jennifer Hummel
- Rance Howard as Bald Cabby
- Anne Kerry Ford as Mother of Baby
- William Newman as Elderly Man
- Kevin Brophy as TV Reporter

== Production ==
Winona Ryder auditioned for the film but was rejected because Bridges felt she was too young to portray his love-interest.

== Aesthetic elements ==
A book containing the painting The Ascent into the Empyrean by Hieronymus Bosch is shown, and it is said that the dying go into the light of heaven "naked and alone". Near the finale as Max lies on the ground, he relives moving from the fuselage of the aircraft and for a moment moves towards the tunnel of light that appears to be modeled on the painting.

== Reception ==
On Rotten Tomatoes, Fearless has an approval rating of 86% based on reviews from 44 critics, with an average score of 7.8/10. The site's consensus states: "This underrated gem from director Peter Weir features an outstanding performance from Jeff Bridges as a man dealing with profound grief." Audiences polled by CinemaScore gave the film a grade of "B+" on an A+ to F scale.

Roger Ebert of the Chicago Sun-Times gave it three out of four stars, and wrote: "Fearless is like a short story that shines a bright light, briefly, into a corner where you usually do not look." Vincent Canby of The New York Times said: "Mr. Bridges does well with a difficult role", and Todd McCarthy of Variety called it one of Bridges' best performances. McCarthy was positive about the film, calling it "beautifully made in all respects", but noted that as a mainstream film about profound issues and emotions, some audiences will appreciate it, but others may find it pretentious. Geoff Andrew of Time Out wrote: "As often with Weir, there's considerably less here than meets the eye."

== Accolades ==
| Award | Category | Recipient | Result |
|---|---|---|---|
| 20/20 Awards | Best Supporting Actress | Rosie Perez | Nominated |
| Academy Awards | Best Supporting Actress | Rosie Perez | Nominated |
| Awards Circuit Community Awards | Best Actress in a Supporting Role | Rosie Perez | Nominated |
| Berlin International Film Festival | Golden Bear | Peter Weir | Nominated |
| Berlin International Film Festival | Honourable Mention | Rosie Perez | Won |
| Boston Society of Film Critics Awards | Best Supporting Actress | Rosie Perez | Won |
| Chicago Film Critics Association Awards | Best Actor | Jeff Bridges | Nominated |
| Chicago Film Critics Association Awards | Best Supporting Actress | Rosie Perez | Won |
| Dallas–Fort Worth Film Critics Association Awards | Best Supporting Actress | Rosie Perez | Won |
| Golden Camera Awards | Best International Actress | Isabella Rossellini | Won |
| Golden Globe Awards | Best Supporting Actress – Motion Picture | Rosie Perez | Nominated |
| Los Angeles Film Critics Association Awards | Best Supporting Actress | Rosie Perez | Won (Note: Tied with Anna Paquin for The Piano.) |
| New York Film Critics Circle Awards | Best Supporting Actress | Rosie Perez | Runner-up |
| Southeastern Film Critics Association Awards | Top Ten Films | | 5th Place |
| Turkish Film Critics Association Awards | Best Foreign Film | | 20th Place |

== Home media ==
With video and audio quality superseding previous home video releases, Fearless was released on Blu-ray Disc by the Warner Archive Collection in November 2013.
