= The Unidentified =

- Directed by: Kevan Tucker
- Written by: Kevan Tucker
- Produced by: Stephen Gifford; Tim O'Neill; Elyse Pasquale
- Starring: Jay Sullivan; Erin Ecklund; Lauren Shannon; Jack Reiling; Michael Raimondi; Robert O'Gorman; Kathryn Rossetter; Ryland Blackinton
- Music by: This Is Ivy League; Clap Your Hands Say Yeah! Andrew Bird and score by Erik White
- Release date: June 2008 (Brooklyn International Film Festival)
- Running time: 113 minutes
- Country: United States
- Language: English

The Unidentified is a 2008 drama film by writer-director Kevan Tucker in his directorial debut for Floodgate Features. It won "Best New Director" at the 2008 Brooklyn International Film Festival and "Best First Feature" at the 2008 FirstGlance Film Festival in Philadelphia. It also screened at the Asheville Film Festival and Methodfest Film Festival in 2008, and is available on DVD through Vanguard Cinema. It is considered part of the mumblecore movement.

The film was shot on the Panasonic AG-DVX100A with a Redrock M2 attachment.

== Plot ==
Estlin is a journalist in New York City, fresh out of college and ready to make a difference in an all-too cynical world. He struggles with defining career and relationships, and after his best friend Brooke moves away, finds himself falling for Sophie, a downtown photographer. Estlin must confront whether his dogged pursuit of truth helps or hinders his attempt to find a place in the world.
