= Kathryn Rossetter =

American acting teacher and actress

- Born: Abington, Pennsylvania
- Occupation: Actress

Kathryn Rossetter is an American acting teacher and actress who is best known for her role in a Broadway production of Death of a Salesman (1984) as well as its 1985 TV movie adaptation.

== Career ==
=== Acting ===
She has appeared in films such as The Night We Never Met (1993), Speed 2: Cruise Control (1997), Fearless (1993), and The Unidentified (2008). She also voiced Edna the cook in the 2006 video game Bully (video game), and a pedestrian in Grand Theft Auto: San Andreas in 2004.

On the television she acted in shows such as Law & Order: Special Victims Unit, Kate & Allie and L.A. Law.

As well as "Death of a Salesman, she has performed in theater in "The Good Coach" (1989), "Love Lemmings" (1991), and "The Time of the Cuckoo" (2000).

=== Teaching ===
Rossetter teaches acting, and is the head of the Master of Fine Arts Acting Department at The New School where she teaches Contemporary Technique, and also teaches a Chekhov Scene Study class at the New Studio. She also does one-to-one coaching for actors.

== #MeToo movement ==
Rossetter co-starred with Dustin Hoffman in both the Broadway production and TV movie adaptation of Death of a Salesman in the mid-1980s. In 2017 during the #MeToo movement, Rossetter alleged that Hoffman had sexually assaulted her during these productions. Hoffman never officially responded to Rossetter's allegations.

== Filmography ==
Year	Title	Role	Notes
1988	Shakedown	Margaret O'Leary	
1989	Hell High	Coach Sandy Hand	
1993	The Night We Never Met	Excuse Me Shopper	
1993	Fearless	Jennifer Hummel	
1997	Speed 2: Cruise Control	Mother at Condo	
1998	Whatever	Carol Stockard	
2004	Peoples	Mrs. Anderson	
2008	The Unidentified	Mrs. Dewan	
