= Chicago Film Critics Association Awards 1993 =

Annual US film awards ceremony

6th CFCA Awards

Best Film:
Schindler's List

The 6th Chicago Film Critics Association Awards honored the finest achievements in 1993 filmmaking.

== Winners ==
- Best Actor:
  - Liam Neeson - Schindler's List
- Best Actress:
  - Holly Hunter - The Piano
- Best Cinematography:
  - Schindler's List - Janusz Kamiński
- Best Director:
  - Steven Spielberg - Schindler's List
- Most Promising Actor:
  - Leonardo DiCaprio - What's Eating Gilbert Grape
- Most Promising Actress:
  - Ashley Judd - Ruby in Paradise
- Best Film:
  - Schindler's List
- Best Foreign Language Film:
  - The Piano (Australia/New Zealand/France)
- Best Score:
  - "The Piano" - Michael Nyman
- Best Screenplay:
  - Schindler's List - Steven Zaillian
- Best Supporting Actor:
  - Ralph Fiennes - Schindler's List
- Best Supporting Actress:
  - Rosie Perez - Fearless
