= The Night We Never Met =

1993 American romantic comedy film

- Directed by: Warren Leight
- Written by: Warren Leight
- Produced by: Michael Peyser
- Starring: Matthew Broderick; Annabella Sciorra; Kevin Anderson; Jeanne Tripplehorn; Justine Bateman
- Cinematography: John Thomas
- Edited by: Camilla Toniolo
- Music by: Evan Lurie
- Distributed by: Miramax Films
- Release date: April 30, 1993
- Running time: 99 minutes
- Country: United States
- Language: English
- Budget: $8 million
- Box office: $1.9 million (US)

The Night We Never Met is a 1993 American romantic comedy film directed by Warren Leight. The film stars Matthew Broderick, Annabella Sciorra and Kevin Anderson.

== Plot summary ==
Upset with his current living arrangements, Sam rotates occupancy of a flat with slob Brian and painter Ellen. Each of them gets the apartment to themselves two days each week. Sam and Ellen never see each other, they just leave notes. When Sam and Brian swap their schedules without telling Ellen, she mistakenly believes Brian is the one she's falling in love with.

== Cast ==
- Matthew Broderick as Sam Lester
- Annabella Sciorra as Ellen Holder
- Kevin Anderson as Brian McVeigh
- Jeanne Tripplehorn as Pastel
- Justine Bateman as Janet Beehan
- Michael Mantell as Aaron Holder
- Christine Baranski as Lucy
- Doris Roberts and Dominic Chianese as Nosy Neighbors
- Tim Guinee as Kenneth
- Bradley White as Todd
- Greg Germann as Eddie
- Dana Wheeler-Nicholson as Inga
- Louise Lasser as Mrs. Winkley
- Billy Campbell as Shep
- Michelle Hurst as Leslie
- Lewis Black as Marty Holder
- Ranjit Chowdhry as Cabbie
- Naomi Campbell as French Cheese Shopper
- Richard Poe as Bartender
- Katharine Houghton as Less/More Cheese Lady
- David Slavin as Chuck Barber
- Brooke Smith as Catha
- Bitty Schram as Pharmacy Clerk
- Billy Strong as Doorman
- Catherine Lloyd Burns as Deli Customer
- Michael Mastrototaro as Triple Creme Cheese Shopper
- Michael Imperioli and Suzanne Dottino as Dry Cleaning Customers
- Jose Evelio Alveraz as "My name is Eduardo"
- Paul Guilfoyle as Sparrow's Nest Salesman
- Davidson Thomson as Foreign Film Actor
- Kathryn Rossetter as "Excuse Me" Shopper
- Mary B. McCann as Yogurt Eating Date
- Steven Goldstein as 3rd Cheese Man
- Suzanne Lanza as Shep's New Date
- Garry Shandling as Dental Patient

== Reception ==
Rotten Tomatoes, a review aggregator, reports that 56% of nine surveyed critics gave the film a positive review; the average rating is 4.8/10. Lawrence Cohn of Variety wrote, "A quintessential New York movie, The Night We Never Met takes a novel premise and develops it in fits and starts." Janet Maslin of The New York Times wrote, "The Night We Never Met is never lifelike enough to evoke the madly romantic New York atmosphere it seems to be after. The actors try hard, but they are hamstrung by too many broad strokes and silly inconsistencies."
