= Boston Society of Film Critics Awards 1993 =

Annual US film awards ceremony

14th BSFC Awards

December 19, 1993

Best Film:
Schindler's List

The 14th Boston Society of Film Critics Awards honored the best filmmaking of 1993. The awards were given on 19 December 1993.

== Winners ==
- Best Film:
  - Schindler's List
- Best Actor:
  - Daniel Day-Lewis – In the Name of the Father
- Best Actress:
  - Holly Hunter – The Piano
- Best Supporting Actor:
  - Ralph Fiennes – Schindler's List
- Best Supporting Actress:
  - Rosie Perez – Fearless
- Best Director:
  - Steven Spielberg – Schindler's List
- Best Screenplay:
  - Robert Altman and Frank Barhydt – Short Cuts
- Best Cinematography:
  - Janusz Kamiński – Schindler's List
- Best Documentary:
  - Visions of Light
- Best Foreign-Language Film:
  - Farewell My Concubine (Ba wang bie ji) • China/Hong Kong
