= Karekare, New Zealand =

Karekare
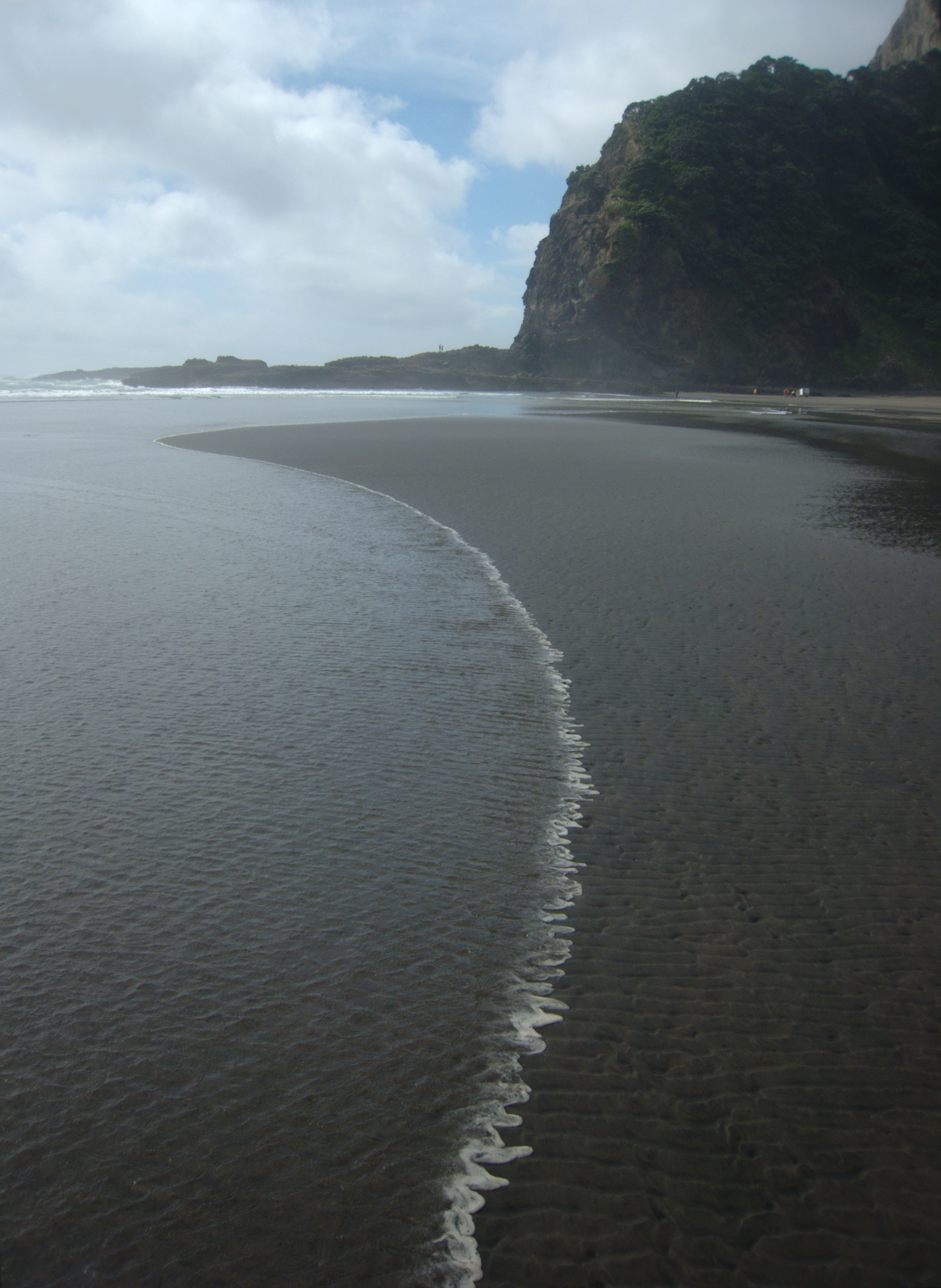
- Waves rippling over Karekare Beach
- Interactive map of Karekare
- Coordinates: 36°59′10″S 174°28′48″E
- Country: New Zealand
- Region: Auckland Region
- Ward: Waitākere ward
- Community board: Waitākere Ranges Local Board
- Electorates: Waitākere; Tāmaki Makaurau

Government
  - Territorial Authority: Auckland Council
  - Mayor of Auckland: Wayne Brown
  - Waitākere MP: Vanushi Walters
  - Tāmaki Makaurau MP: Oriini Kaipara

Area
  - Total: 11.92 km^{2} (4.60 sq mi)

Population (June 2025)
  - Total: 300
  - Density: 25/km^{2} (65/sq mi)

Karekare is a small coastal settlement in West Auckland, New Zealand, sandwiched between the Waitākere Ranges and a large black sand surf beach.

== Geography ==
It is located 35 kilometres (22 mi) west of Auckland city centre, south of the larger beach of Piha. It is north of Whatipu, south of Piha and west of the Centennial Memorial Park and Water Catchment area, which cover most of the native bushland Waitākere Ranges. Karekare Beach is the confluence of the Company Stream, which was traditionally known by the name Waiteahoaho, and the Karekare Stream. The Karekare Falls are located inland from the beach.

The beach at Karekare is split into two sections separated by the, Karekare Stream, Karekare Beach to the south and Tāhoro / Union Bay, to the north. Two major geographical sites within Karekare are The Watchman, traditionally known by the names Te Matua and Te Tokamatua, a significant knoll on the beach's ridge, and Paratahi Island, located to the south of Karekare.

Karekare is the remains of an ancient volcanic crater of the Waitākere Volcano, which was uplifted due to tectonic forces between 3 and 5 million years ago. Te Matua (the Watchman) is the hardest remaining portion of dacite of the crater, and Paratahi Island is a lava dome.

== History ==
Karekare, along with the greater Waitākere Ranges area, was traditionally settled by the Te Kawerau ā Maki iwi. Karekare is one of the few locations where textiles created prior to European contact have been preserved. The ocean between Piha and the Pararaha Valley was traditionally known as Waikarekare, referring to the turbulent waters of the Tasman Sea. Over time, the name was shortened to Kakare and Karekare, and was used for the beach and the general area.

A traditional Te Kawerau ā Maki legend of the area involves three rocks found on the beach. According to the legend, Te Matua (the Watchman), the large headland of the beach, had two children during Te Ao Kohatu, the age where inanimate things of the world could walk. Te Matua's children would play at the beach, however one disobeyed their parent, and strayed too far away. When the age of Te Ao Kohatu ended, her two children were frozen in place: Te Tokapiri, the obedient child who remained close to their mother, and Te Tokapaoke, who stands at the southern end of Karekare, alone in the ocean. Te Tokapaoke became known as Paratahi Island.

Karekare was a major settlement for Te Kawerau ā Maki in the Waitākere Ranges, known for its extensive kūmara (sweet potato) cultivations inland. Te Kawerau ā Maki rangatira Kowhatu-ki-te-uru, known for his abilities to create stone pā, settled at Karekare in the mid-18th century. Directly north-east of the beach, Kowhatu-ki-te-uru built a pā known as Te Kaka Whakaara ("The Kākā Parrot Standing Watch") on The Watchman (Te Matua), while the kāinga (village) near the pā was known as Te Marae o Mana, referring to Kowhatu-ki-te-uru's son Manaairangi. The cultivations were known as Māraroa ("The Great Gardens"). Other significant pā in the area included one on Te Ahua Point, and one at Te Aoaho (above Karekare Falls).

In 1826 during the Musket Wars, Te Kaka Whakaara pā was attacked by two Ngāpuhi taua (war parties) led by Hōne Heke and Te Kahakaha. Te Kawerau ā Maki killed many of the Ngāpuhi taua by pelting them with rocks, however could not match the musket fire from the war parties. Te Kawerau ā Maki suffered many losses, especially at Wharengarahi, a cave on the beach where many of the tribe's women, children and elderly were taking shelter. Due to the battle, Karekare was not occupied when Te Kawerau ā Maki returned after the war, due to the tapu caused by the deaths.

During the early colonial era, Karekare was the site of two Kauri mills: Karekau Sawmill, which operated between 1881 and 1886, and a smaller mill which opened in 1906. In the early 20th century, the lower Karekare valley was farmland, tended to by the Farley family. In 1935, the Karekare Surf Club was formed.

Into the modern era, artists such as Sir Peter Siddell and Joyce Campbell have lived in the area and called the beach home, being inspired by the regions landscape. Today, Karekare is home to the Karekare House Artists Residency, giving artists the opportunity to live in the historic Karekare House, and practice in the area for 3 month periods running from March to November every year.

The region was heavily affected by Cyclone Gabrielle in February 2023, with many historic homes damaged or destroyed.

== Demographics ==
Karekare is described by Statistics New Zealand as a rural settlement, and covers 11.92 km^{2} (4.60 sq mi) and had an estimated population of 300 as of June 2025, with a population density of 25 people per km^{2}. It is part of the Waitākere Ranges South SA2 statistical area.

Historical population
Year	Pop.	±% p.a.
2006	192	—
2013	243	+3.42%
2018	297	+4.10%
2023	309	+0.80%
The 2006 population is for a smaller area of 6.03 km^{2}. Source:

Karekare had a population of 309 in the 2023 New Zealand census, an increase of 12 people (4.0%) since the 2018 census, and an increase of 66 people (27.2%) since the 2013 census. There were 162 males, 144 females and 3 people of other genders in 108 dwellings. 4.9% of people identified as LGBTIQ+. The median age was 41.4 years (compared with 38.1 years nationally). There were 66 people (21.4%) aged under 15 years, 36 (11.7%) aged 15 to 29, 153 (49.5%) aged 30 to 64, and 54 (17.5%) aged 65 or older.

People could identify as more than one ethnicity. The results were 92.2% European (Pākehā); 12.6% Māori; 1.9% Pasifika; 4.9% Asian; 2.9% Middle Eastern, Latin American and African New Zealanders (MELAA); and 3.9% other, which includes people giving their ethnicity as "New Zealander". English was spoken by 96.1%, Māori language by 2.9%, and other languages by 16.5%. No language could be spoken by 1.9% (e.g. too young to talk). The percentage of people born overseas was 23.3, compared with 28.8% nationally.

Religious affiliations were 5.8% Christian, 1.0% Hindu, 1.0% Islam, 2.9% New Age, and 5.8% other religions. People who answered that they had no religion were 77.7%, and 6.8% of people did not answer the census question.

Of those at least 15 years old, 63 (25.9%) people had a bachelor's or higher degree, 117 (48.1%) had a post-high school certificate or diploma, and 33 (13.6%) people exclusively held high school qualifications. The median income was $37,900, compared with $41,500 nationally. 36 people (14.8%) earned over $100,000 compared to 12.1% nationally. The employment status of those at least 15 was that 108 (44.4%) people were employed full-time, 45 (18.5%) were part-time, and 6 (2.5%) were unemployed.

== Tourism ==
At the turn of the century, holidaymakers would travel by coach from Glen Eden to stay at the Karekare guest house. Karekare continues to be a popular destination for Aucklanders in summer, but receives fewer visitors than nearby Piha, partly because the road is narrow and only recently sealed. There are surf patrols in summer.

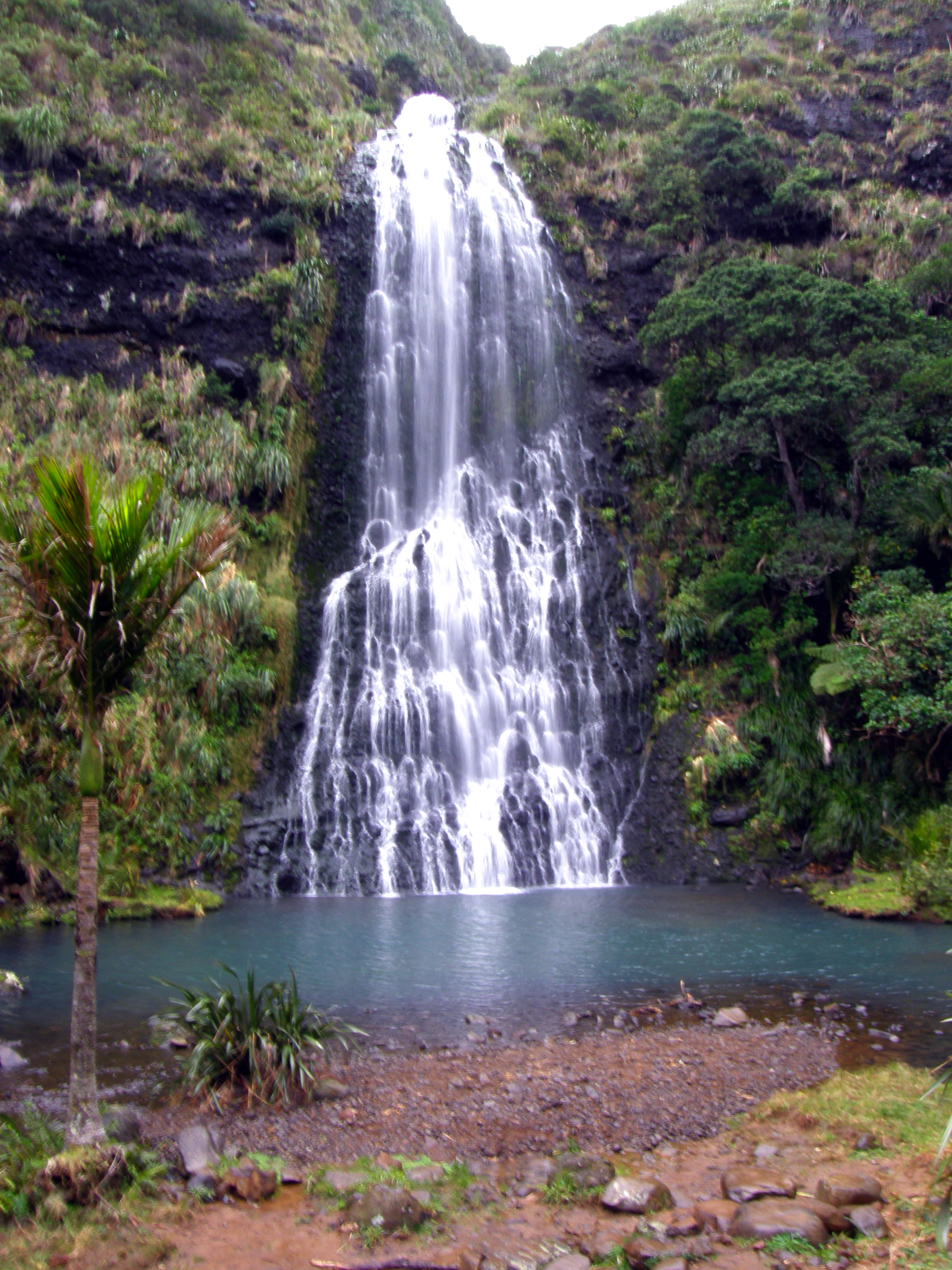
Karekare Falls

The track to the base of the Waitakere waterfall—Karekare falls—is a short walk from the road. The track to the top of the falls is now closed to help stop the spread of the incurable Kauri dieback disease.

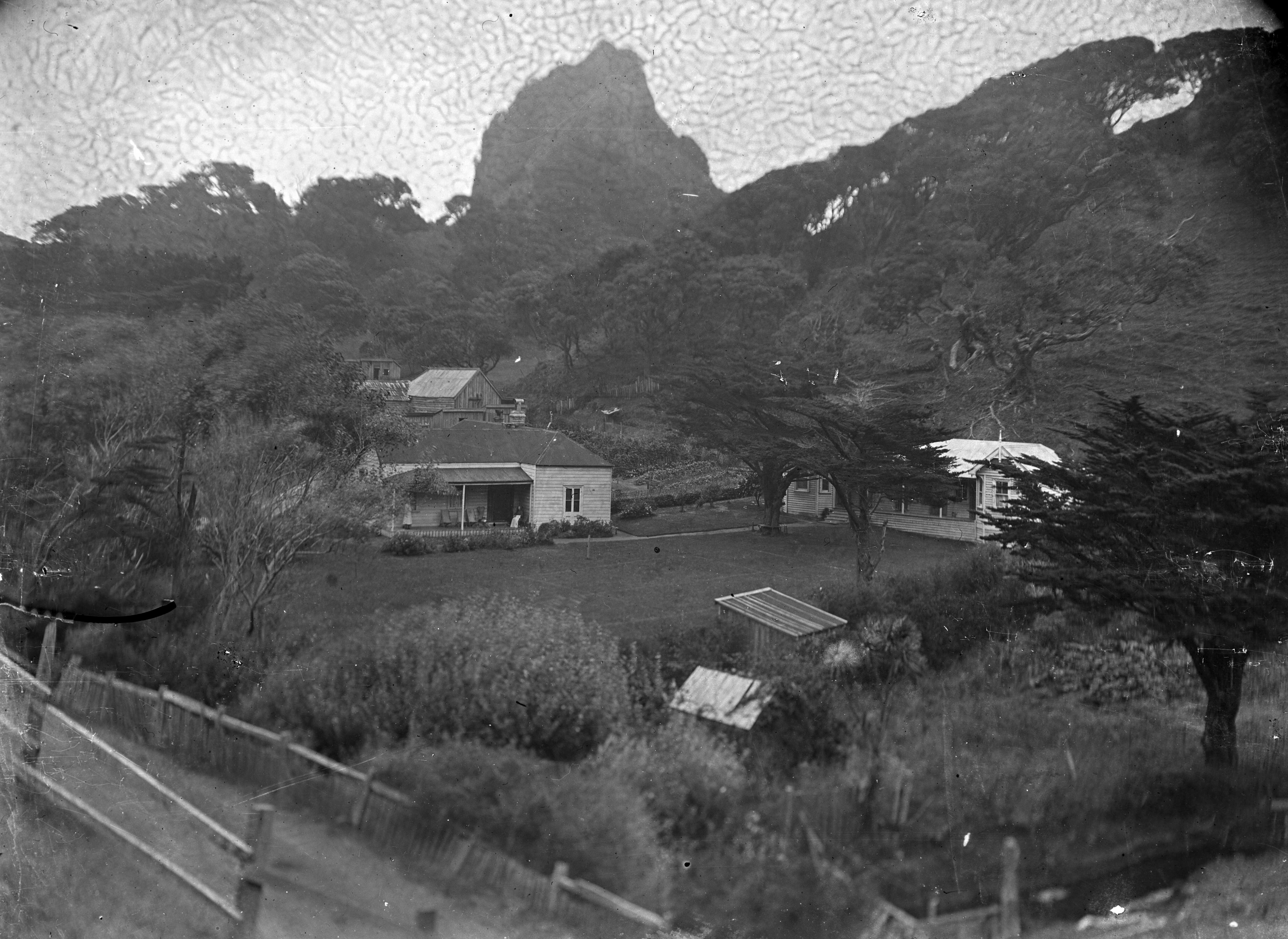
Farley's Boarding House circa 1916

The settlement was immortalised in song by Crowded House on their Together Alone album in 1993, much of which was recorded at Karekare; the well known Dub/Reggae group, Salmonella Dub, used the name as well on their album Feel the Seasons Change - Live with the NZSO. The beach was used in the film The Piano, which included scenes shot at both Karekare and Piha.

== Safety information ==
The rips along this section of coast are very unpredictable and can shift with little warning, and have caused a number of drownings. Lifeguards advise swimming between the red and yellow flags, during patrol hours.

== Education ==
There is a small community primary school (Lone Kauri School) with approximately 30 students located at Karekare. It is an independently operating branch of Oratia School, under the supervision of a senior teacher.

== Panorama ==
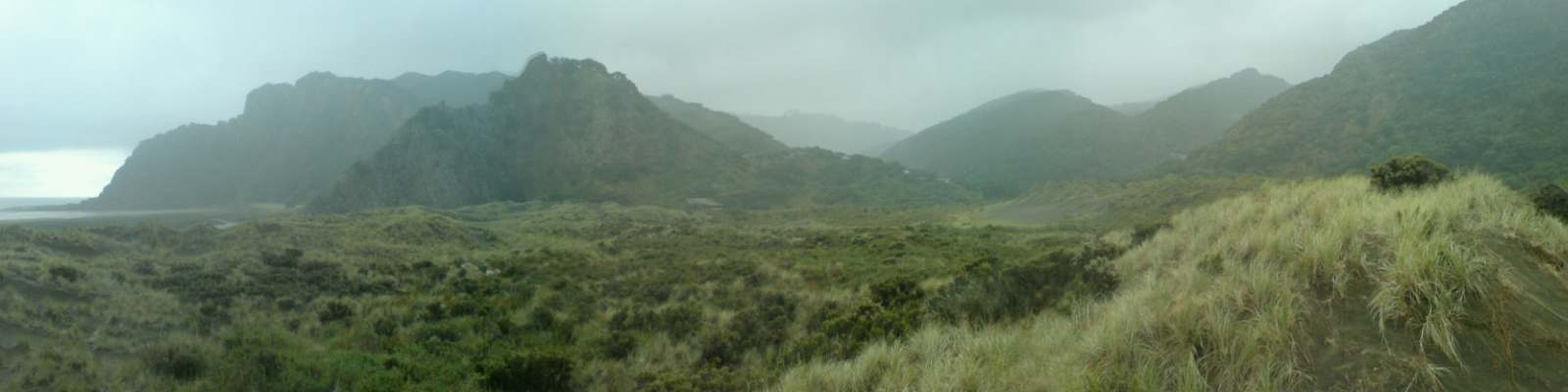
Looking north from the southern end of Karekare Beach.
