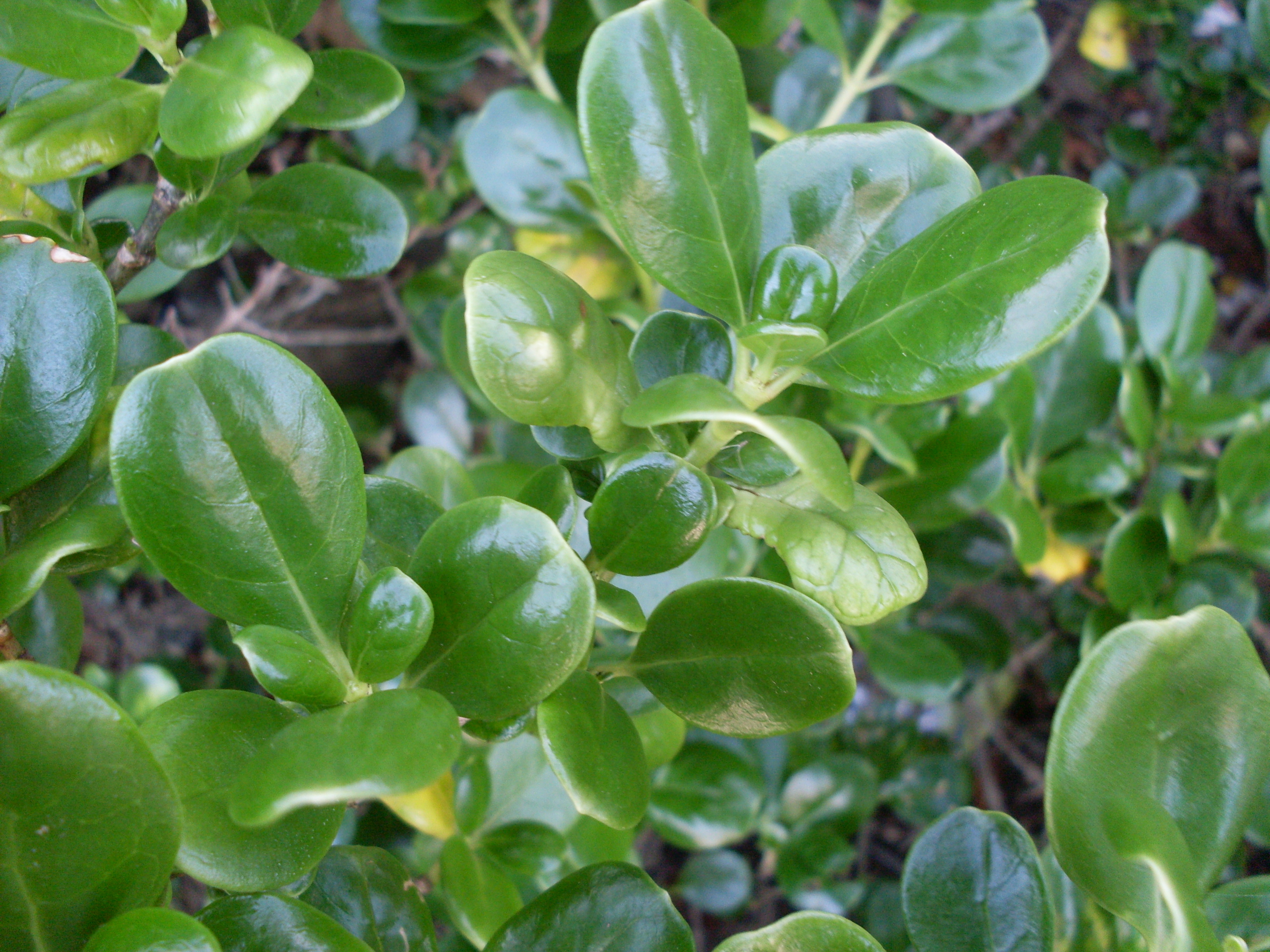

Conservation status
- Not Threatened (NZ TCS)

Scientific classification
- Kingdom: Plantae
- Clade: Tracheophytes
- Clade: Angiosperms
- Clade: Eudicots
- Clade: Asterids
- Order: Gentianales
- Family: Rubiaceae
- Genus: Coprosma
- Species: C. repens

Binomial name
- Coprosma repens A.Rich.

Synonyms
- Coprosma baueriana Hook. f. Coprosma baueri auct. non Endl. Coprosma retusa Hook. f Coprosma stockii Williams

= Coprosma repens =

Species of flowering plant

Coprosma repens is a species of flowering shrub or small tree of the genus Coprosma, in the family Rubiaceae, native to New Zealand. Common names include taupata, tree bedstraw, mirror bush, looking-glass bush, New Zealand laurel and shiny leaf.

== Description ==
The habit of this species varies markedly with its situation. In exposed situations, such as cliffs, it assumes a prostrate habit, while in more sheltered areas it can grow as a small tree up to 8 metres in height. It has thick and very glossy leaves which vary considerably in size, depending on exposure to the elements. The leaf margins are recurved, occasionally to the extent that the leaf may be cylindrical in cross-section. The shiny leaves aid its survival near coastal locations.

C. repens is dioecious. Flowers are produced in spring and summer, with the male flowers appearing in dense, compound clusters, and the female flowers in smaller clusters. Male flowers have a funnel shaped corolla that is 5 mm long, with lobes equal to the tube. Female flowers have a short calyx, and a tubular corolla 3 mm long, with lobes shorter than the tube. Female plants produce orange-red ovoid drupes, which are about 8 mm in diameter and 10 mm in length.

== Distribution ==
The species is native to the North Island, South Island, Kermadec Islands and Three Kings Islands in New Zealand.

In Australia, it has become naturalised in coastal areas of Victoria, New South Wales, South Australia, Western Australia and Tasmania, and it is now classified as an environmental weed.

== Cultivation ==
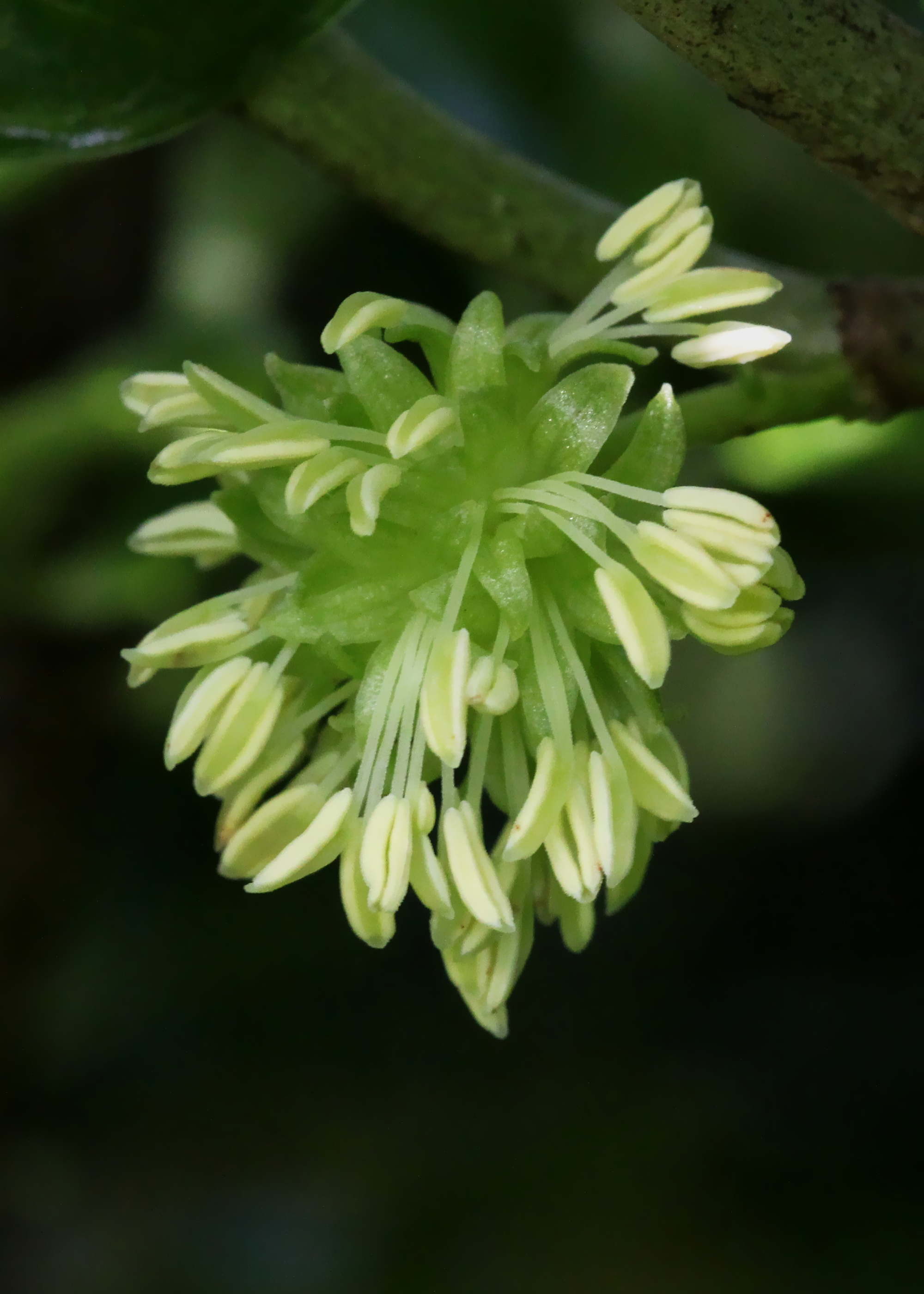
Male

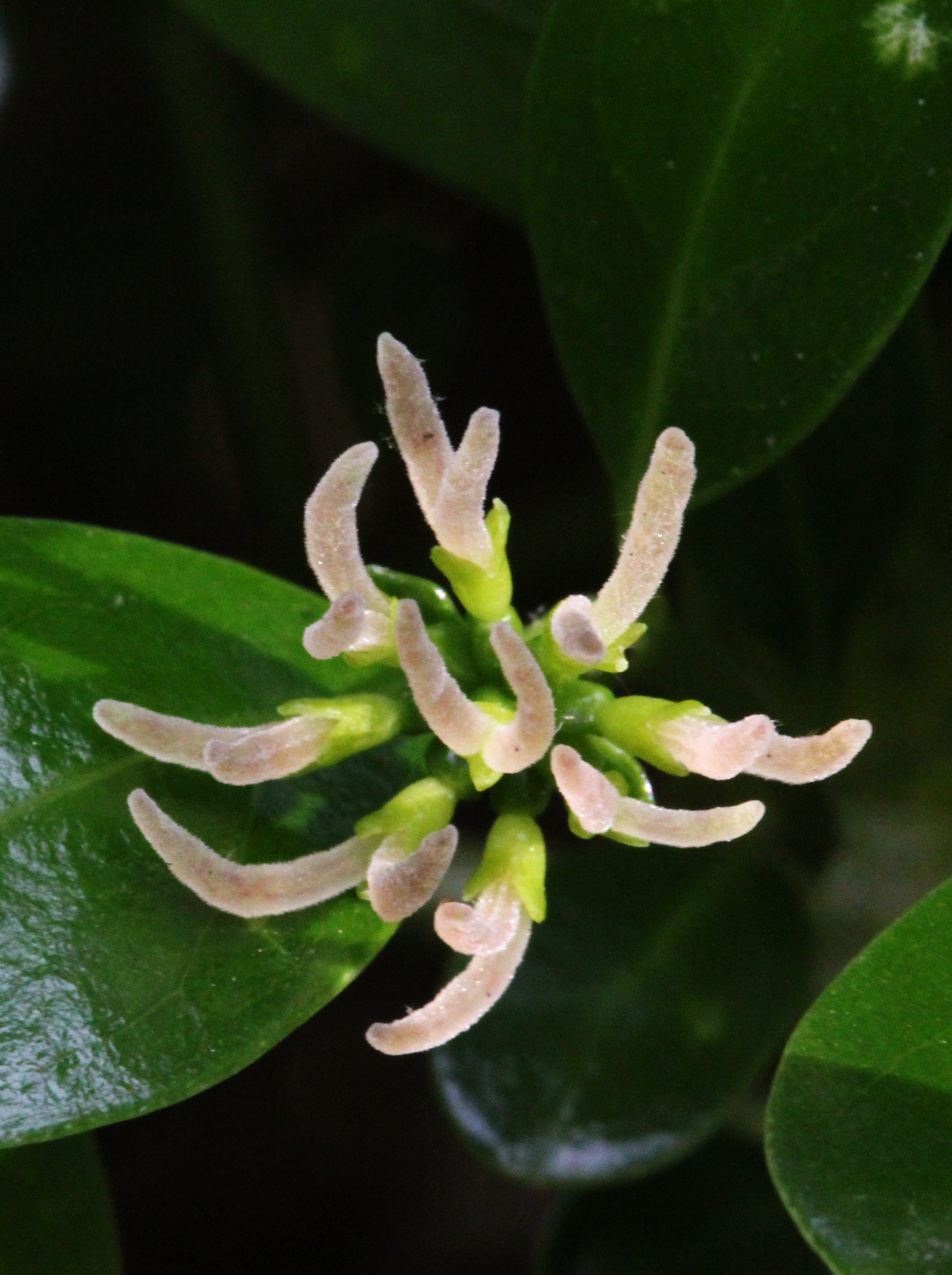
Female

Taupata flowers

The species has been popular in coastal gardens due to its resistance to salt spray. Although it prefers well-drained sandy soils, it can cope with heavier soils.

There is a large number of cultivars:

- 'Coffee Cream' - creamy yellow leaf margins
- 'Coppershine' - foliage with a copper-bronze tinge
- 'Evening Glow' - golden foliage which changes to rich orange and pink-red shades during autumn and winter
- 'Marble Chips' - leaves with white margins and speckles
- 'Picturata' - leaves with a golden central area
- 'Pink Splendour' - leaves have pink and maroon shaded margins
- 'Rainbow Surprise' - a small cultivar with small pink and yellow-green leaves
- 'Taupata Gold' - cream leaves with green centres
- 'Variegata' - leaves with a creamy-white margin
- 'Yvonne' - compact form with dark-green leaves

The cultivars 'Marble Queen' and 'Picturata' have gained the Royal Horticultural Society's Award of Garden Merit (confirmed 2017).

== Gallery ==
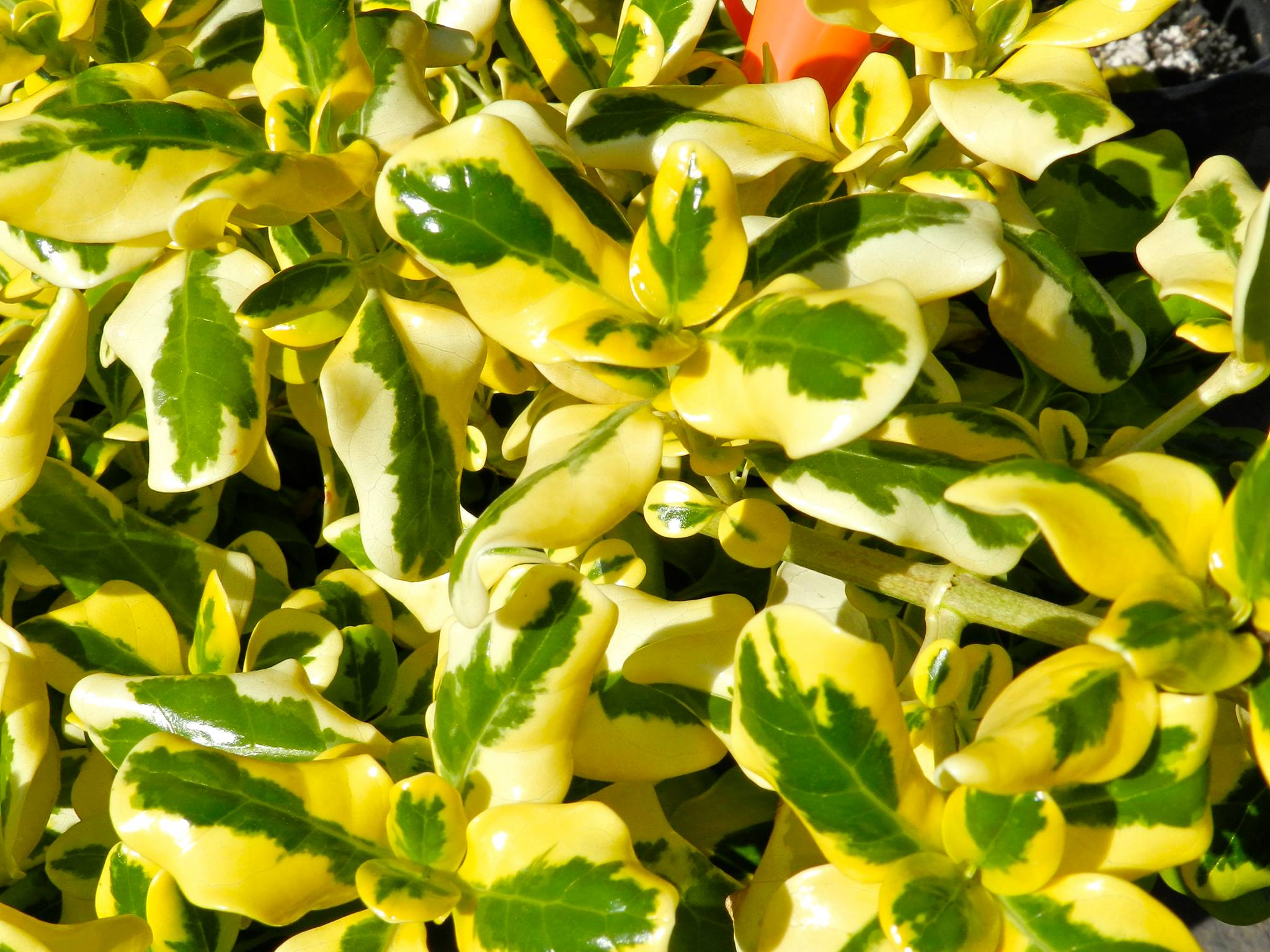
'Coffee Cream' - a garden variety

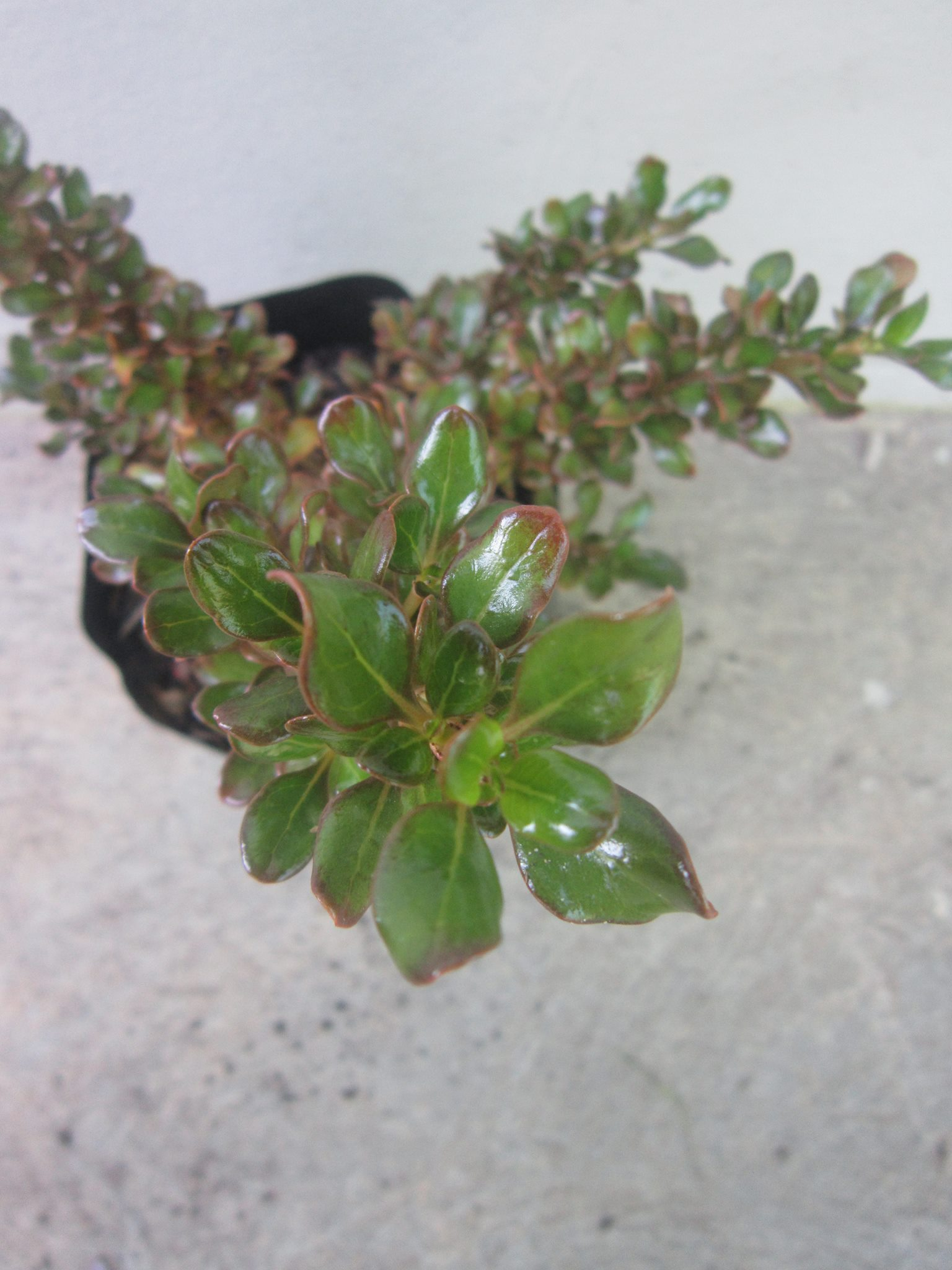
'Copper Shine'

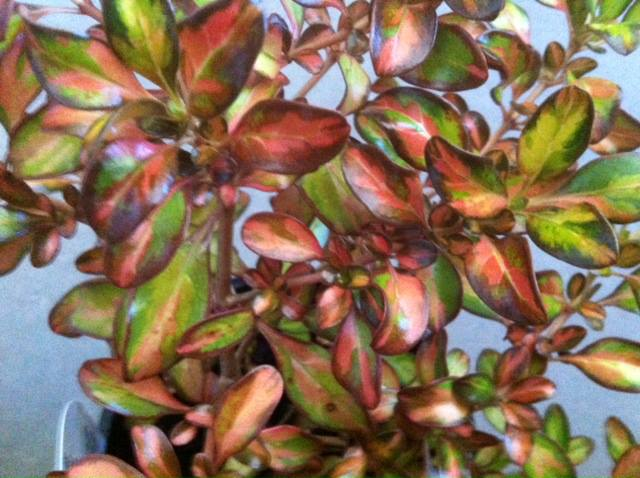
'Evening Glow'

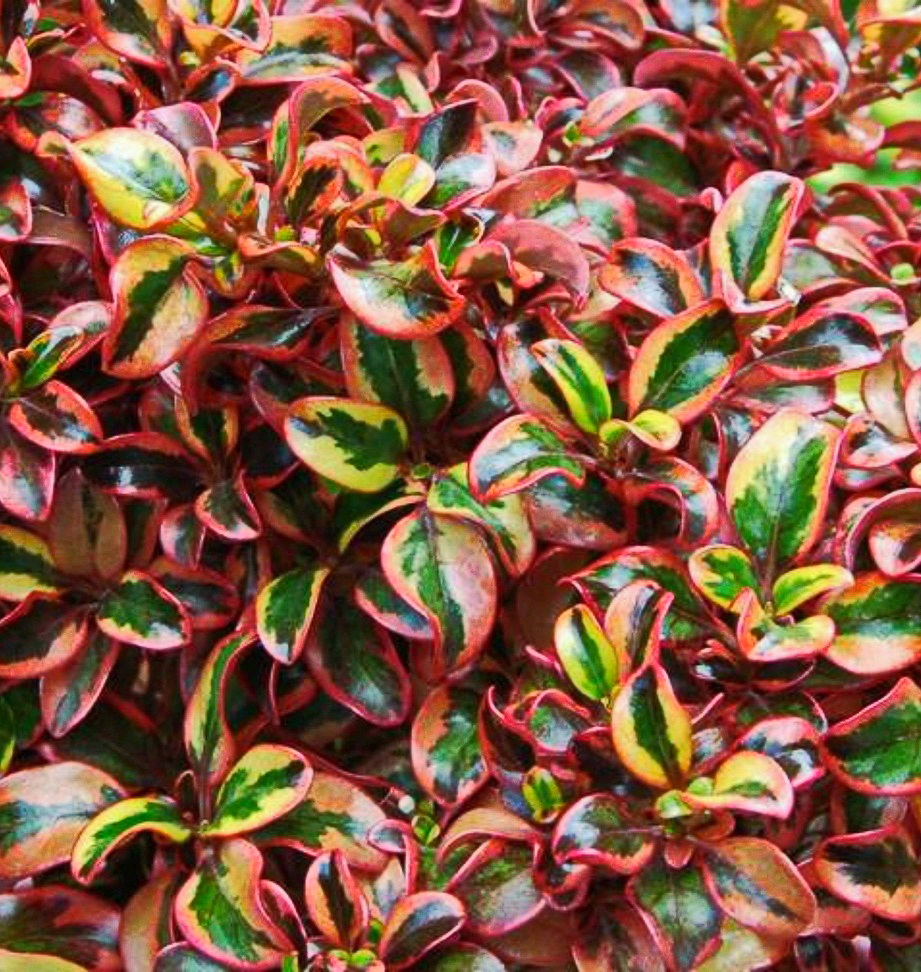
'Inferno'

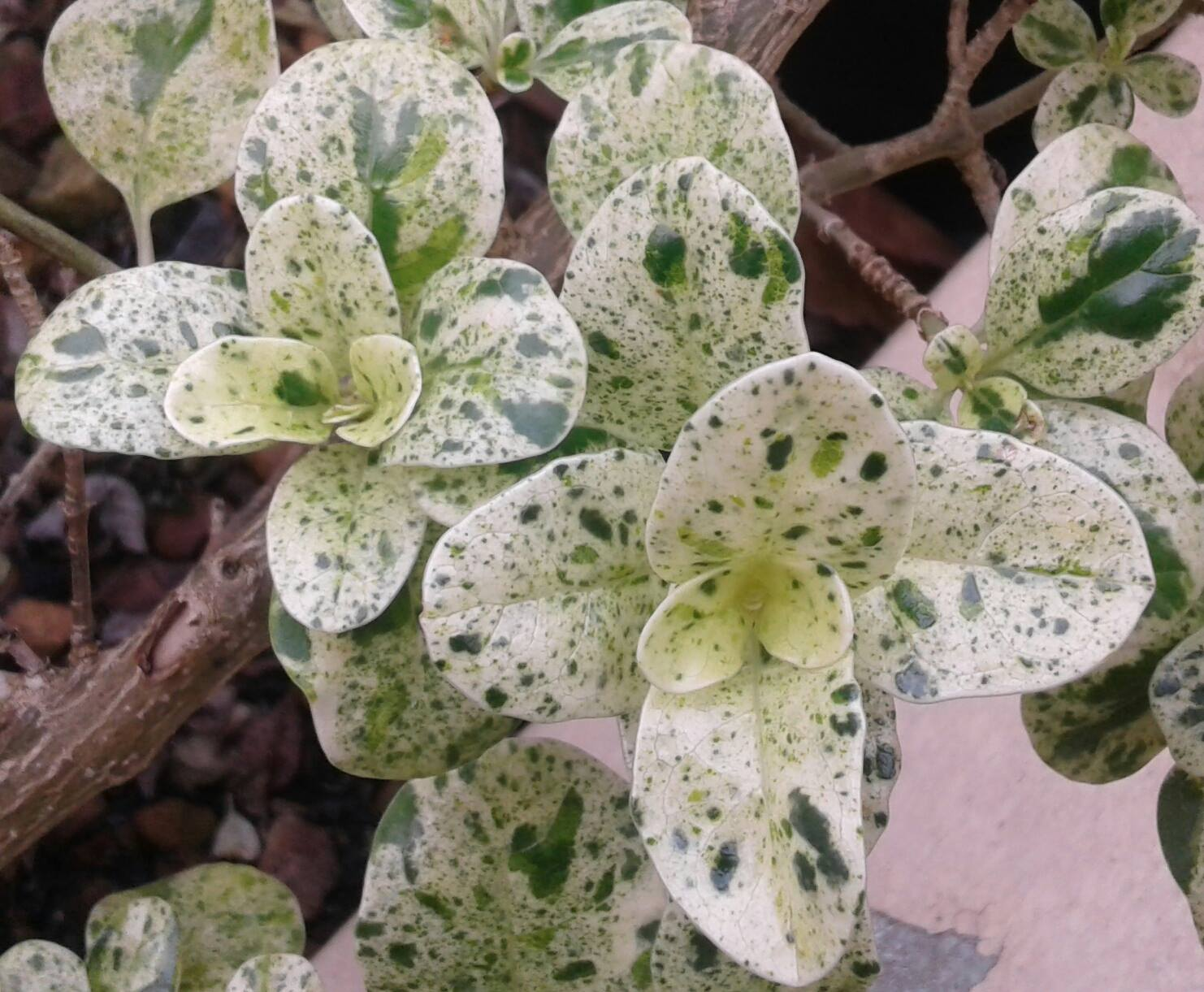
'Marble Chips' variety

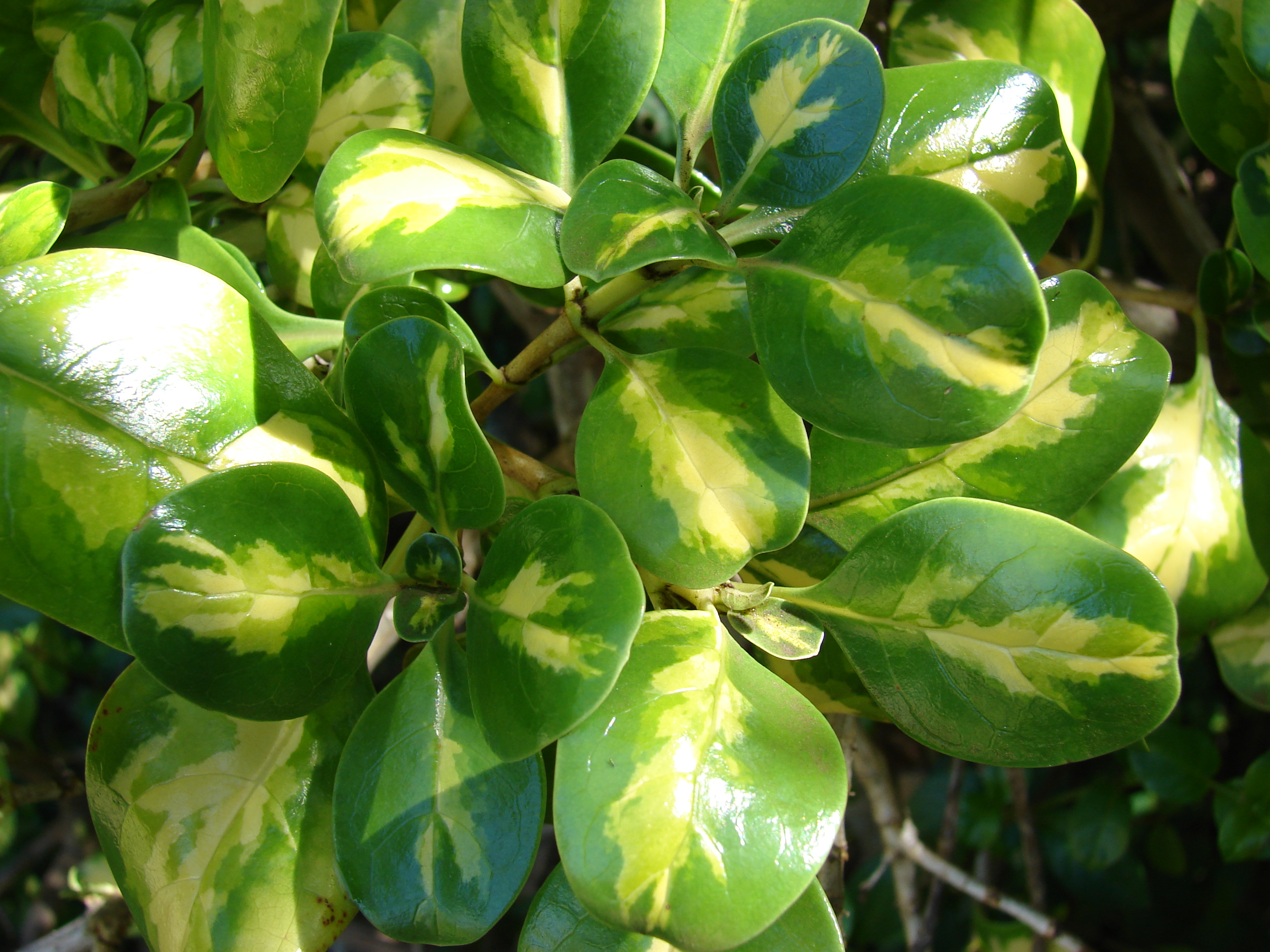
'Picturata'

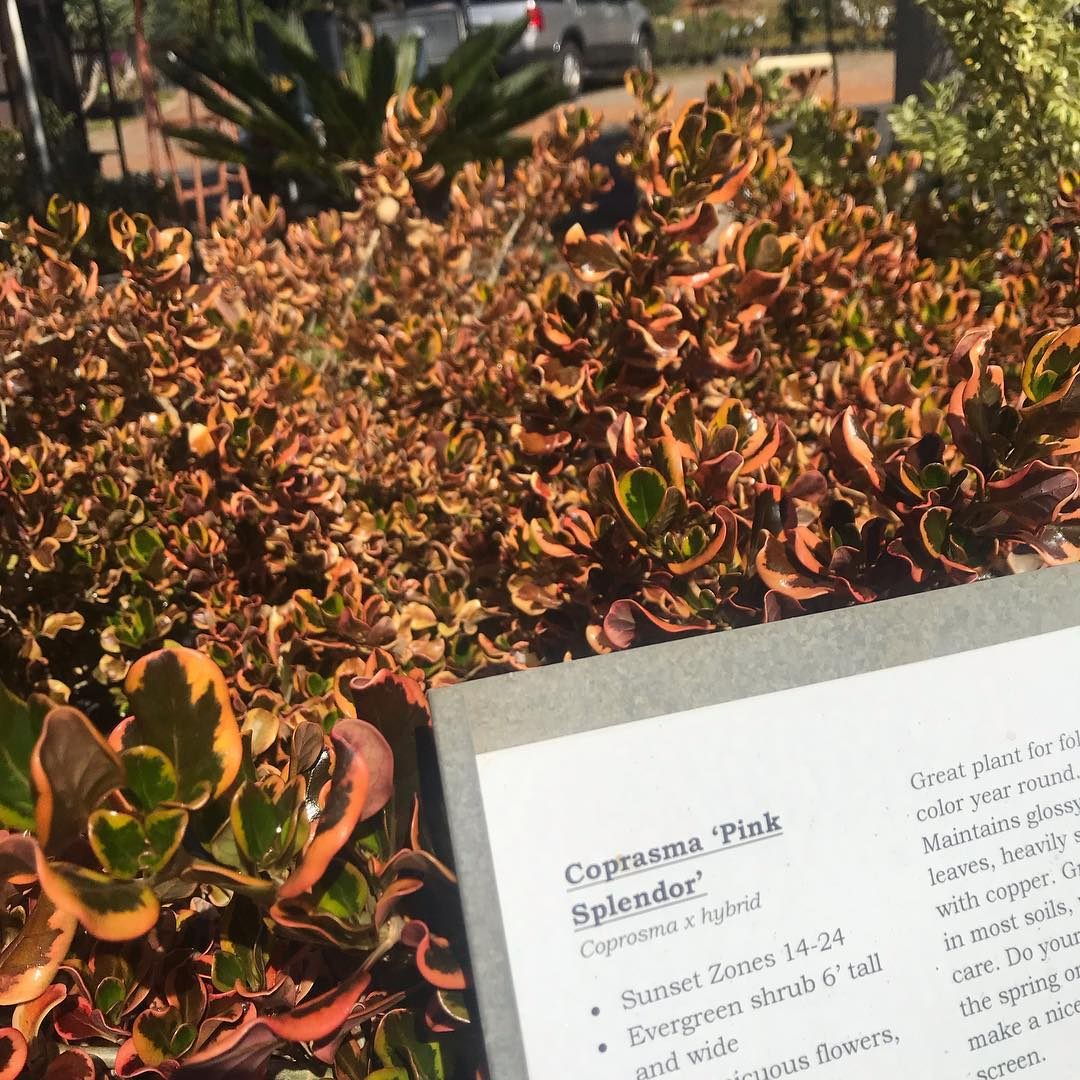
'Pink Splendour'

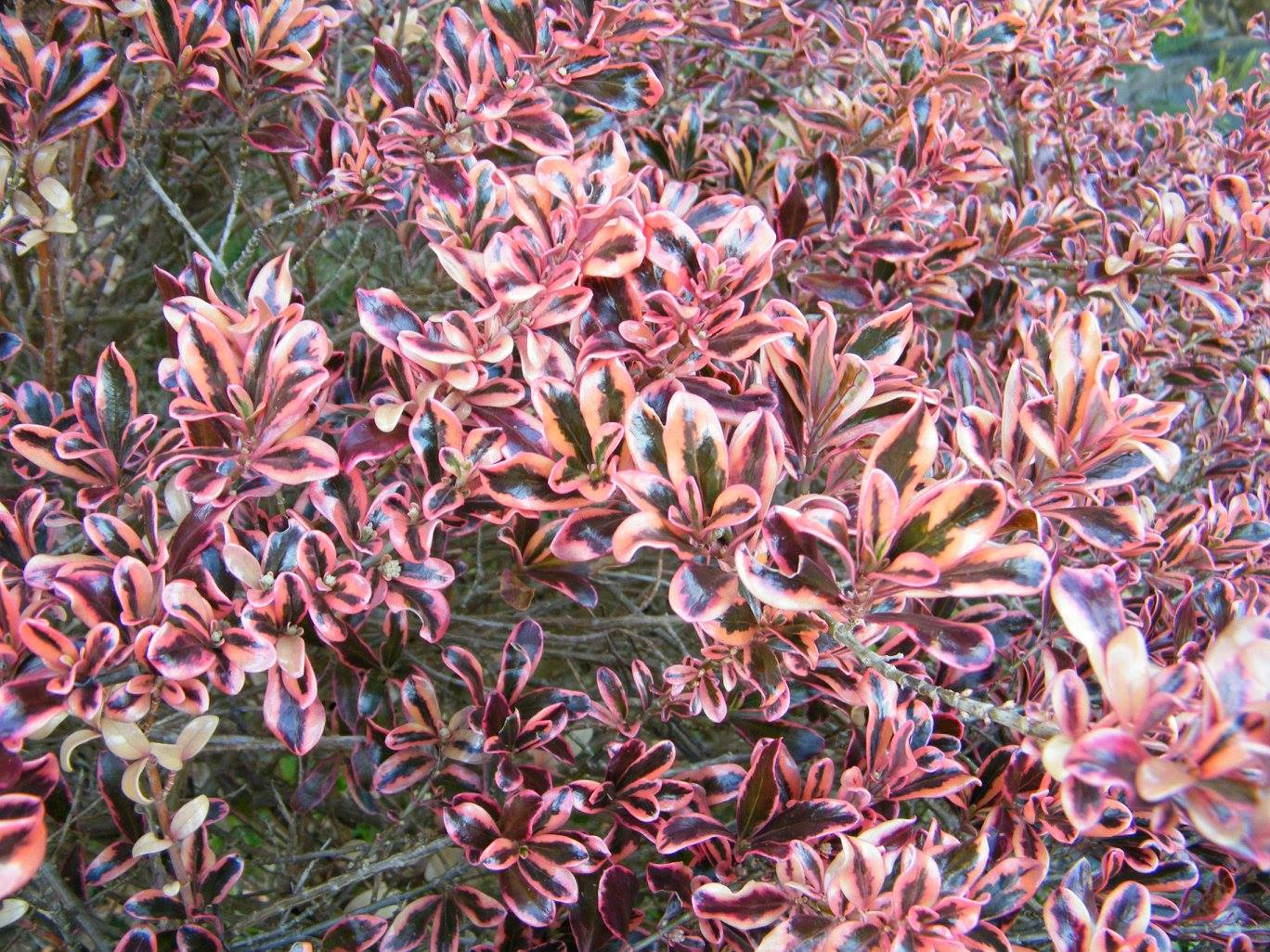
'Rainbow Sunshine'

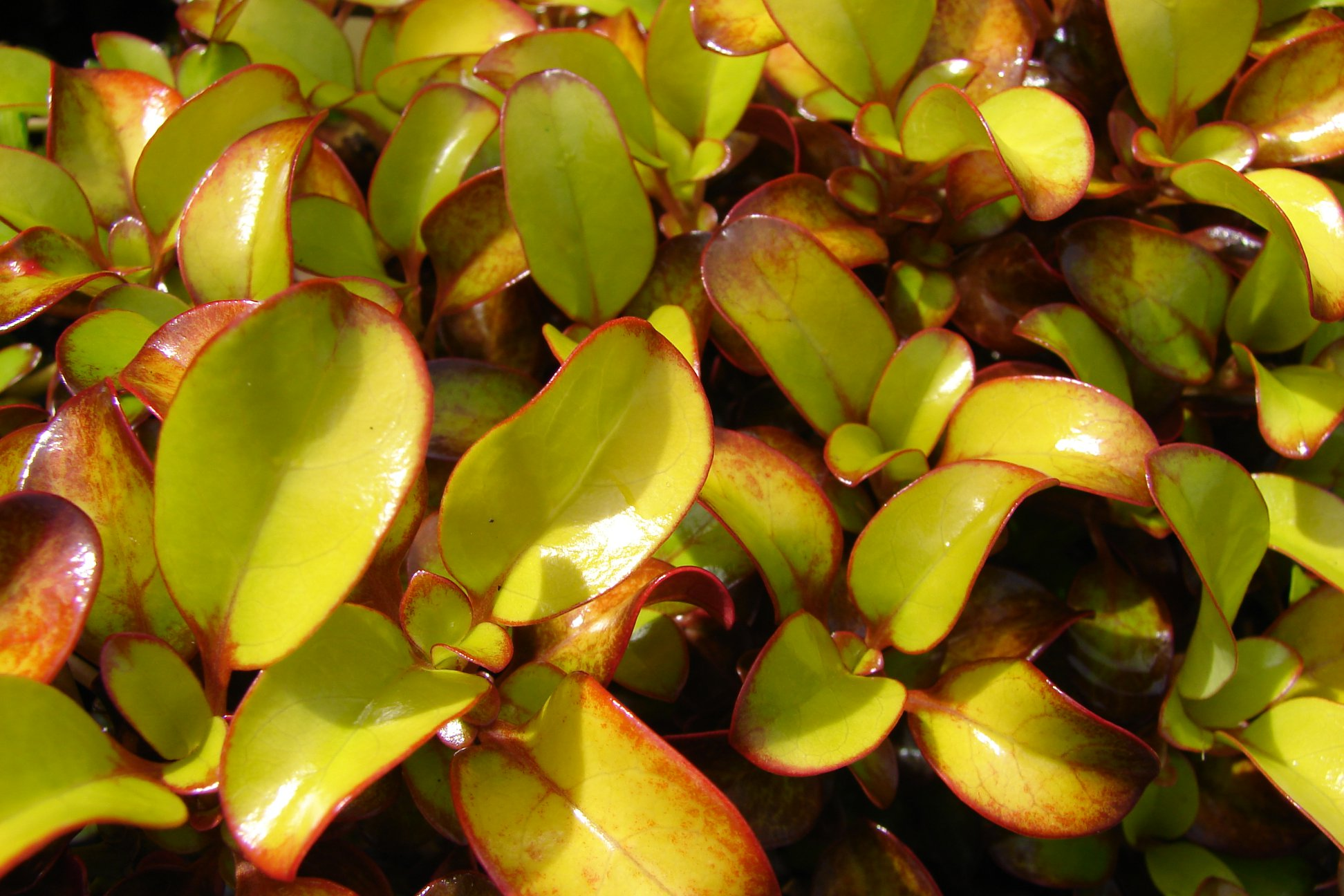
'Tequila Sunrise' variety

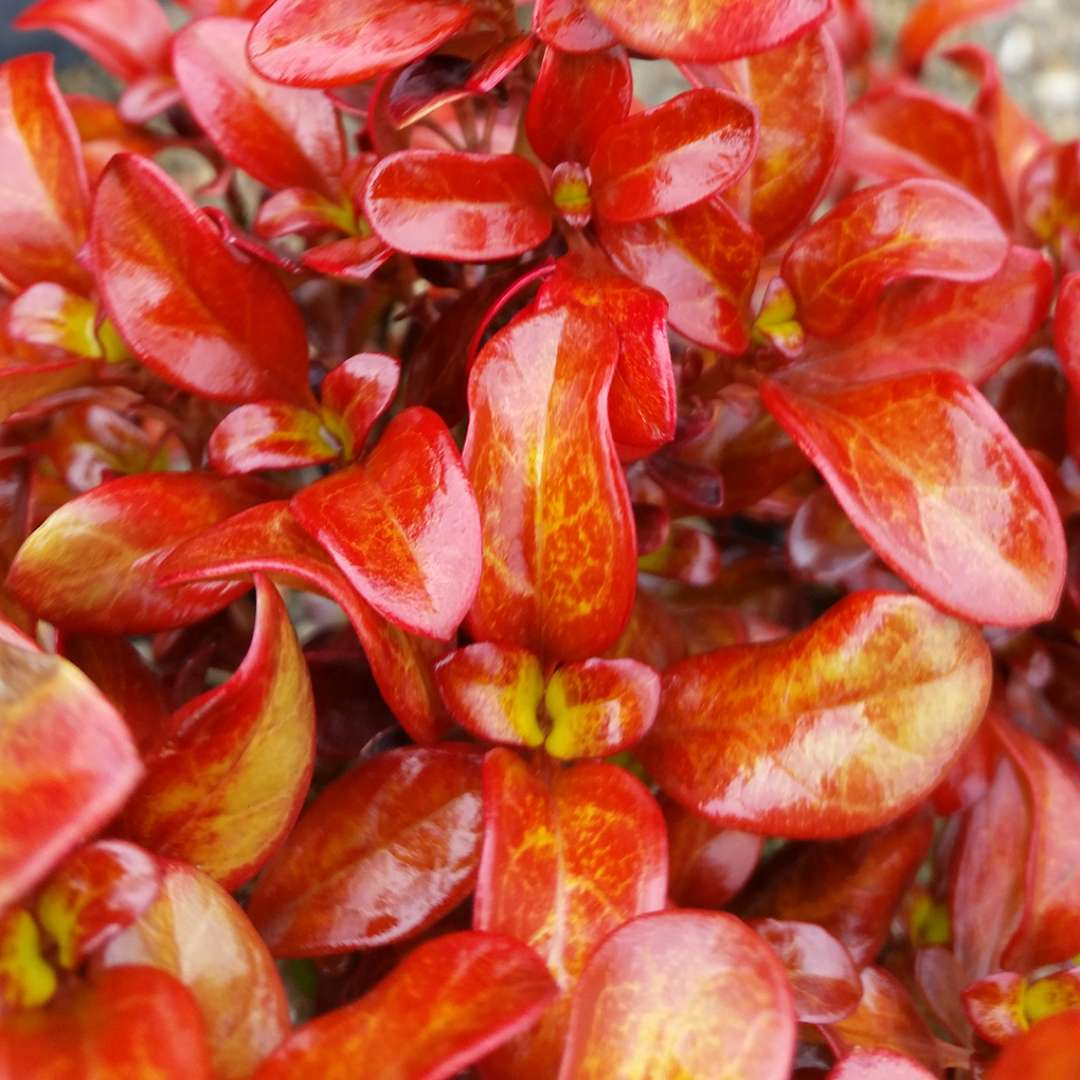
'Wax Wings' variety

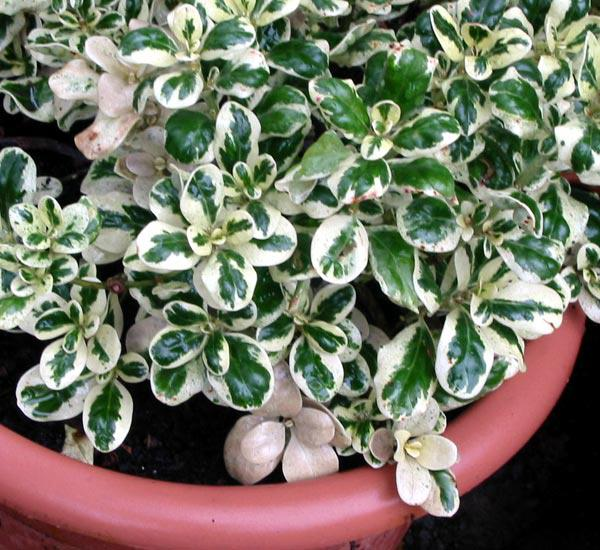
'Variegeta'
