= Dallas–Fort Worth Film Critics Association Awards 1993 =

1993 award cemony in Dallas, TX

1st Dallas-Fort Worth Film Critics Association Awards
- Date: 1993
- Location: Dallas, Texas
- Country: United States
- Presented by: Dallas-Fort Worth Film Critics Association
- Website: dfwfilmcritics.net

The 1st Dallas-Fort Worth Film Critics Association Awards honored the best filmmaking of 1993.

== Winners ==
- Best Actor:
  - Liam Neeson - Schindler's List
- Best Actress:
  - Holly Hunter - The Piano
- Best Director
  - Steven Spielberg - Schindler's List
- Best Film:
  - Schindler's List
- Best Supporting Actor:
  - Ralph Fiennes - Schindler's List
