= Alistair Fox =

New Zealand scholar and author

- Born: 1948 (age 77–78)
- Education: University of Canterbury, New Zealand; University of Western Ontario, Canada
- Occupations: Scholar, author
- Years active: 1974–present
- Title: Professor Emeritus University of Otago

Alistair Graeme Fox (born 1948 in Richmond, New Zealand) is a New Zealand scholar, former university administrator, and writer who specialises in English Tudor literature and history, New Zealand literature and cinema studies, and contemporary literary and film theory.

== Education ==
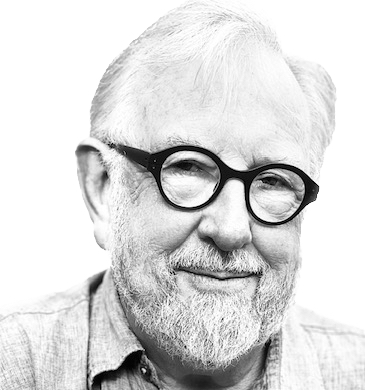
Alistair Fox in 2020

Educated at the University of Canterbury, Alistair Fox was awarded a master's degree in 1970 for a thesis titled "Religion and Humanism in Sir Thomas More's Utopia". He holds a PhD from the University of Western Ontario, Canada, granted in 1974. His PhD dissertation, “Thomas More’s View of English Historical Experience in the Controversial Writings”, testifies to his sustained interest in this compelling figure dubbed "a man for all seasons" by Erasmus, More's contemporary and friend.

== Career ==
Alistair Fox currently holds the title of professor emeritus at the University of Otago, Dunedin, New Zealand. Until his retirement in 2013, he held a Personal Chair in English Literature at this same university, where he also served as Pro-Vice Chancellor, Division of Humanities. His honours include the award of a Nuffield Visiting Fellowship, Claire Hall, Cambridge (1980–1981) and an appointment as visiting fellow, All Souls College, Oxford (1987-1988).

Initially known for his scholarship on English Tudor literature, since 2008 Fox has turned to topics addressing New Zealand literature and culture, cinema studies, and theories of literary and cinematic representation. Despite the apparent range and diversity of his research areas, he retains his initial interest in the creative process, describing his approach as "psychocritical", "genetico-biographical", and "nosographic", drawing upon, respectively, Charles Mauron, Francis Vanoye, and Christian Metz, as he explains in his most recent publication, Melodrama, Masculinity and International Art Cinema (2023).

In this last volume, Fox, as in many of his earlier projects, relies upon sources not available in English, assisted by his reading knowledge of a number of European languages, including Italian, German and French. Not coincidentally, he also translated a spate of significant scholarly works from French into English, notably, Truffaut on Cinema, ed. Anne Gillain (Bloomington, IN: Indiana University Press, 2016) and Totally Truffaut (New York: Oxford University Press, 2021).

== Contributions to Research ==
His major published works have been highly praised within an international context, starting in 1983, when Sir Geoffrey Elton, then Regius Professor of Modern History at Clare College Cambridge, assessed Thomas More: History and Providence, concluding: ". . . this excellent book, which adds to the virtues of its substance a lucidity and readability not commonly found among literary or historical studies, provides the first solid basis on which further work can be undertaken. It will not surprise me if that further work will do little more than demonstrate the value of Dr. Fox's remarkable insights." Czech reviewer Jana Bébarová describes Fox's 2011 monograph Jane Campion: Authorship and Personal Cinema as "a remarkable and enriching perspective on the unique work of the most important woman director of her time", a view shared by Michel Ciment, editor of the French film journal Positif, who characterizes the volume as "remarquable".

Taken as a whole, Fox's research and writing addresses current debates about authorship and the creative process. Gabrielle Malcolm reviewing Jane Campion: Authorship and Personal Cinema proclaims that Fox "effectively announces the death of the intentional fallacy". Lars Bernaerts describes Speaking Pictures: Neuropsychoanalysis and Authorship in Film and Literature as "a distinct intervention" in "the field of cognitive cultural studies", noting that Fox's approach "combines psychoanalysis with neurocognitive science and integrates elements of reception theory and cultural studies" to inaugurate "a new synthesis". His most recent monograph Melodrama, Masculinity and International Art Cinema offers a comprehensive application of the theory of authorship laid out in the earlier Speaking Pictures, through an analysis of a set of award winning and historically significant auteur films that focus on a male protagonist. In the words of film historian David Cook, "Alistair Fox argues persuasively for a new understanding of the generic dimensions of melodrama in the context of the international art film through richly detailed analyses of the work of nine important directors. Theoretically sophisticated and extensively researched from primary sources, it provides us with a history of the post-war 'male melodrama' as a distinct but largely unrecognised cinematic form."

== Selected Publication List ==
Alistair Fox's publications include:

- Melodrama, Masculinity and International Art Cinema (London / New York: Anthem Press, 2023) ISBN 978-1839984075
- Raymond Bellour: Cinema and the Moving Image [with Hilary Radner] (Edinburgh: Edinburgh University Press, 2018) ISBN 978-1474422895
- Coming of Age in New Zealand: Genre, Gender and Adaptation in New Zealand Cinema (Edinburgh: Edinburgh University Press, 2017) ISBN 978-1474429443
- Speaking Pictures: Neuropsychoanalysis and Authorship in Film and Literature (Bloomington, IN: Indiana University Press, 2016) ISBN 978-0253020918
- Jane Campion: Authorship and Personal Cinema (Bloomington, IN: Indiana University Press, 2011) ISBN 978-0253223012
- The Ship of Dreams: Masculinity in Contemporary New Zealand Fiction (Dunedin; Otago University Press, 2008) ISBN 978-1877372544
- The English Renaissance: Identity and Representation in the Reign of Elizabeth I (Oxford: Basil Blackwell, 1997) ISBN 978-0631177470
- Utopia: An Elusive Vision, Twayne Masterworks (Boston: G.K. Hall, 1993) ISBN 978-0805794199
- Politics and Literature in the Reigns of Henry VII and Henry VIII (Oxford: Basil Blackwell, 1989) ISBN 978-0631135661
- Reassessing the Henrician Age: Humanism, Politics, and Reform [with John Guy] (Oxford: Basil Blackwell, 1986) ISBN 978-0631146148
- Thomas More: History and Providence (Oxford: Basil Blackwell, 1982; New Haven: Yale University Press, 1983) ISBN 978-0631135661
