= Franklin District =

Franklin
- Former territorial authority
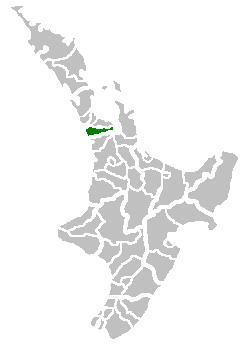
- Coordinates: 37.24°S 175.00°E
- Country: New Zealand

Area
  - Total: 2,187.94 km^{2} (844.77 sq mi)
- Extent: Papakura to Meremere; Port Waikato to Miranda, Firth of Thames

Franklin District was a New Zealand territorial authority that lay between the Auckland metropolitan area and the Waikato Plains. As a formal territory, it was abolished on 31 October 2010 and divided between Auckland Council in the Auckland Region (39.82 percent by land area) to the north and Waikato and Hauraki districts in the Waikato region (60.18 percent) to the south and east. The Auckland portion is now part of the Franklin Ward, which also includes rural parts of the former Manukau City.

Before its abolition, it was administered from the town of Pukekohe. Out-going Franklin District Mayor Mark Ball had proposed that Franklin District become an independent unitary authority, fulfilling both the functions of a local and regional council. However, this was rejected by Minister Rodney Hide.

== Location and extent ==
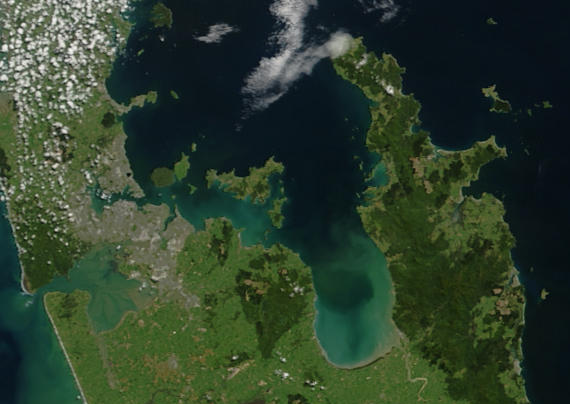
A true-colour image showing the Auckland area. Franklin is at the lower left of the picture. The scene was acquired by NASA's Terra satellite, on 23 October 2002.

The district was bounded in the north by the start of the Auckland metropolitan area and the waters of the Manukau Harbour. Āwhitu Peninsula stretches up the Tasman coast to the mouth of this harbour. Here are located several holiday spots, such as Karioitahi Beach and Matakawau.

To the south, Franklin was bounded by the fertile lowlands of the Waikato Plains. In the east, the land rises to the Hunua Ranges, then falls to the coast of the Firth of Thames. In the west is the Tasman Sea. The Waikato River mouth is at Port Waikato in the south of the region. This is renowned as a good place for surfcasting.

The area is mainly rural, with local settlements such as Waiuku and Tuakau supporting the farming industry. One industry of note is the New Zealand Steel steel mill at Glenbrook, north of Waiuku.

== Mayors ==
Six people served as mayor of Franklin District during its 21-year existence:

	Name	Term
1	Max R. Short	1989–1992
2	Peter Aitken	1992–1995
3	Joan O'Sullivan	1995
4	Matt Barnett	1995–1998
5	Heather Maloney	1998–2004
6	Mark Ball	2004–2010

== Nomenclature ==
The name of "Franklin" probably derives from Lady Jane Franklin, an early British traveller and the wife of Captain Sir John Franklin, who served as Lieutenant-Governor of Van Diemen's Land (1837–1843). Lady Franklin visited the Waikato Heads in 1841.

== Media ==
Franklin County News, a twice-weekly newspaper based in Pukekohe, serves the former Franklin District. The Post Newspaper distributes 26,000 printed copies weekly on a Tuesday, covering Franklin and North Waikato. The Post Newspaper has an office in both Pukekohe and Waiuku. In 2015, the online events calendar and photo news Franklin Life NZ was launched.

== Administrative divisions ==
=== Populated centres ===
Franklin District was divided into 4 wards, Waiuku-Awhitu, Northern, Pukekohe and Southern Wards. As grouped into their present-day authorities they were:

Waiuku-Awhitu, Pukekohe and Northern Franklin wards (now part of Auckland Super-City)

- Wattle Bay, Ōrua Bay, Big Bay, Grahams Beach, Awhitu, Kauritutahi, Matakawau, Matakawau Point, Clarks Beach, Pollok, Te Toro, Glenbrook Beach, Waiau Beach, Mission Bush, Karioitahi, Waiuku, Kingseat, Waiau Pa, Patumāhoe, Te Hihi, Karaka, Roseneath Road, Paerata, Pukekohe, Bombay, Ararimu, Hūnua,

Southern part of Southern Franklin ward (now part of Waikato District)

- Otaua, Aka Aka, Tuakau, Buckland, Paparimu, Pōkeno, Port Waikato, Mercer, Mangatāwhiri, Onewhero, Pukekawa, Glen Murray, Naike, Mangatangi, Limestone Downs

North east part of Southern Franklin ward (now part of Hauraki District)

- Waharau, Whakatīwai, Kaiaua, Miranda
