= Taihiki River =

River in the Auckland Region, New Zealand

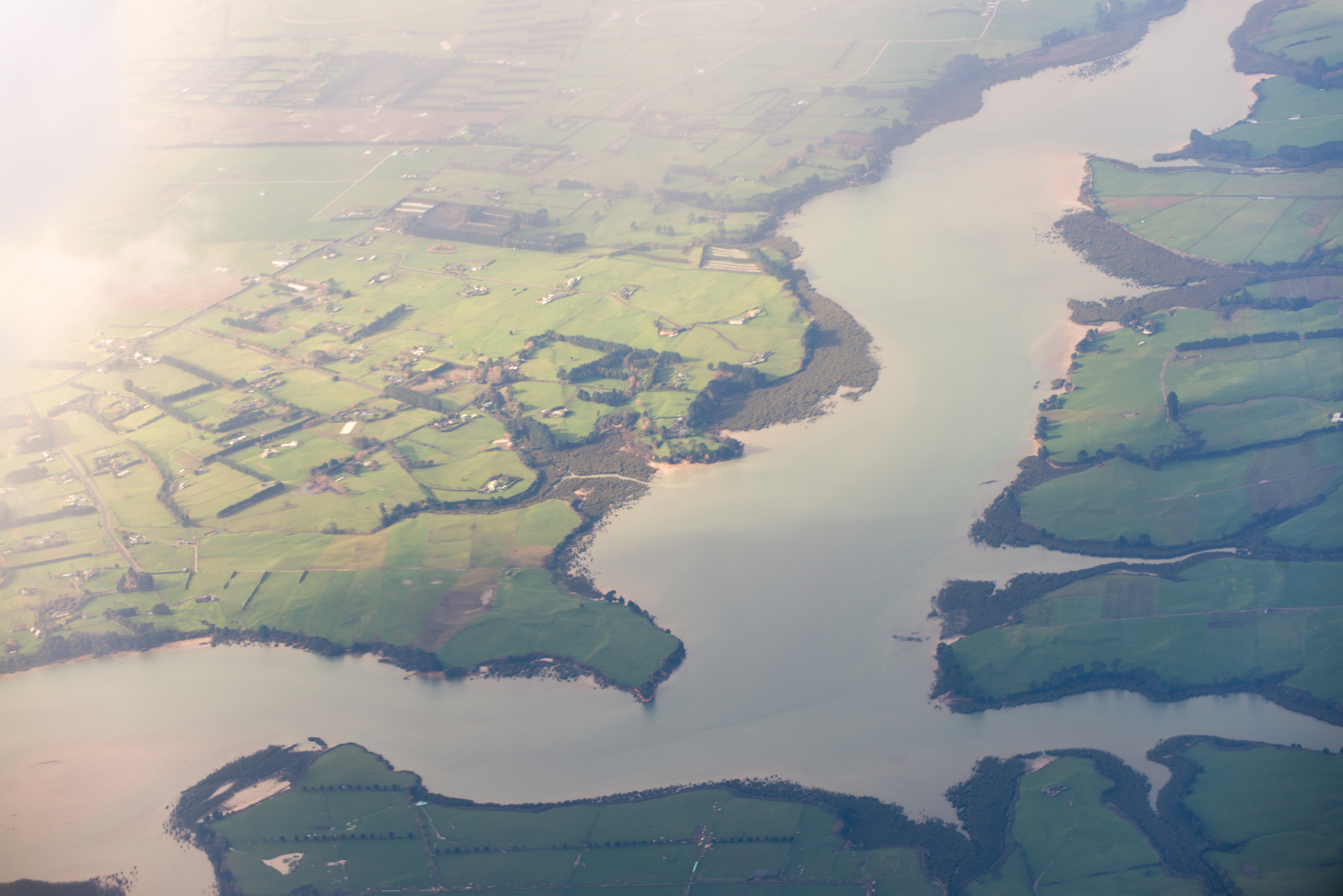
- Aerial view of Taihiki River, looking east, with Waiau Pā on the left side and Glenbrook on the right.

- Mouth of the Taihiki River Taihiki River (New Zealand)
- Route of the Taihiki River
- Native name: Taihiki Awa (Māori)

Location
- Country: New Zealand
- Region: Auckland Region

Physical characteristics
- Source: Patumāhoe
  - coordinates: 37.17893°S 174.83318°E
- Mouth: Waiuku River
  - coordinates: 37.154°S 174.7052°E
- Length: 14 km (9 mi)

Basin features
- Progression: Taihiki River → Waiuku River → Manukau Harbour → Tasman Sea
- Tributaries
  - left: Mauku Stream
- Bridges: Mauku Bridge

The Taihiki River is a river of the Auckland Region of New Zealand's North Island. It flows generally west from its sources north of Patumāhoe to reach the Waiuku River shortly before the latter's outflow into the Manukau Harbour. As with the Waiuku River, much of the Taihiki's length is as a wide silty estuary.

== Geography ==
The river rises north of Patumāhoe, becoming a wide tidal estuary northwest of Glenbrook Road. Most of the river catchment is rural.

The Mauku Stream is a tributary of the river, and the Taihiki River flows into the Waiuku River, between Glenbrook Beach and Clarks Beach. The tidal estuary mouth of the river is composed of sandy intertidal flats, including mangroves and saltmarsh pockets. The left bank of the river mouth to the south is known as Kahawai Point, while the right bank to the north is called Waitete Point. Waitete Point is the location of the Waiau Pa Historic Reserve.

== Biodiversity ==
The river is a nursery area for New Zealand sand flounder and the Flathead grey mullet.

== History ==
The river has historical significance to Māori iwi including Waiohua iwi Ngāti Tamaoho and Ngāti Te Ata, Waikato Tainui hapū Ngāti Tipa and Ngāti Paoa . Numerous archaeological sites are found on the Taihiki River, predominantly shell middens, as well as defended pā sites, pits and terraces. The river is an important fishery, traditionally known for its large fish populations. Waitete Pā at the river mouth was the primary defensive pā for the wider area of settlements, with Kahawai Point to the south being a major settlement. Waitete Pā was occupied by Ngāti Whātua in 1835, at the end of Musket Wars hostilities.

In 1856, the Clark family became the first European settlers in the Taihiki River area, followed by other families in the 1850s and 1860s. The Mauku Hotel was opened on the Taihiki River in 1861.

== See also ==
- List of rivers of New Zealand
