= Waiuku River =

River in the Auckland Region, New Zealand

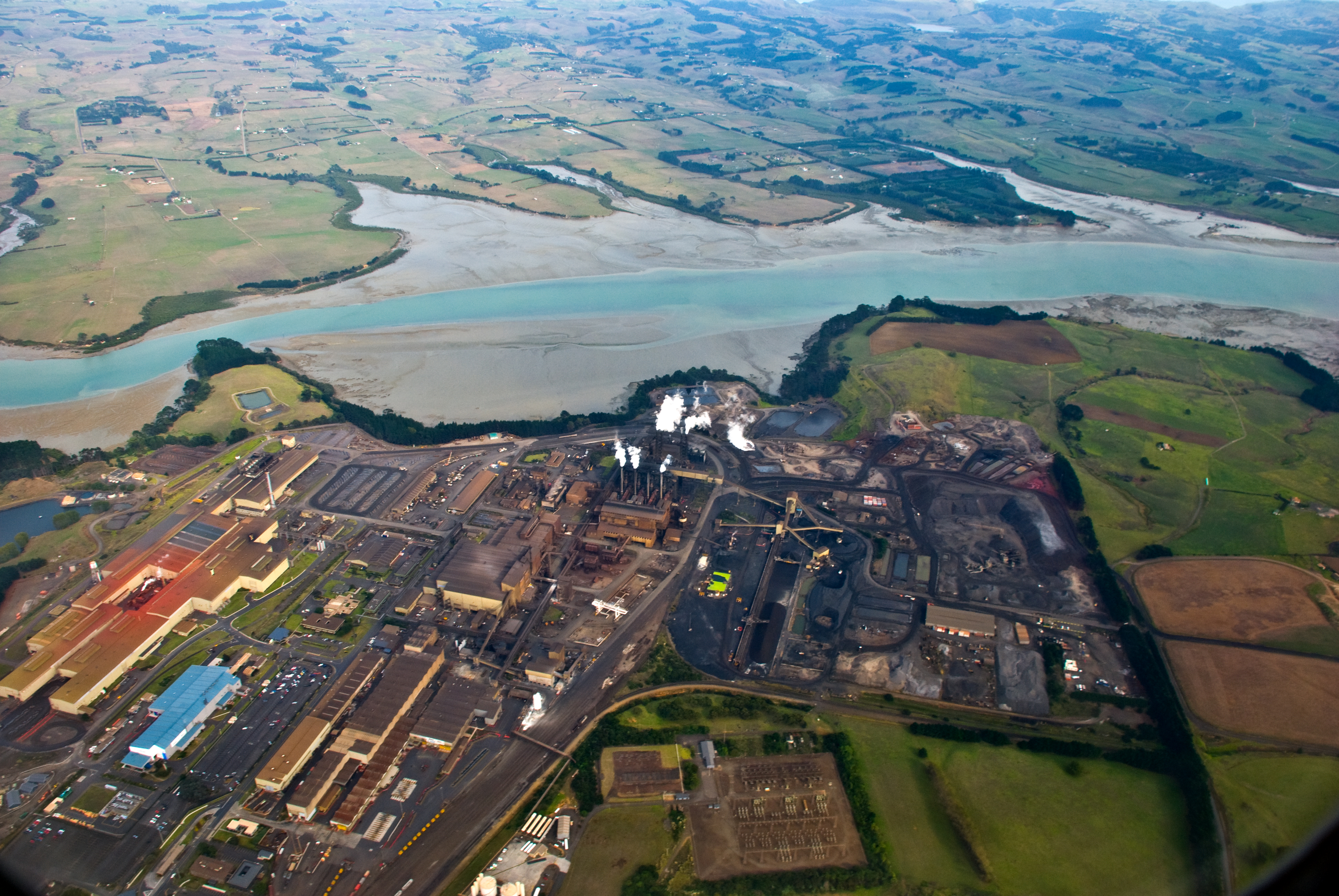
- Aerial view of the Waiuku River and adjacent Glenbrook Steel Mill, with the Needles narrows on the left

- Mouth of the Waiuku River Waiuku River (New Zealand)
- Route of the Waiuku River

Location
- Country: New Zealand
- Region: Auckland Region

Physical characteristics
- Source
  - location: Waiuku Stream
  - coordinates: 37.24959°S 174.73183°E
- Mouth: Manukau Harbour
  - coordinates: 37.1393°S 174.6826°E
- Length: 12 km (7 mi)

Basin features
- Progression: Waiuku River → Manukau Harbour → Tasman Sea
- Landmarks: Waiuku, Glenbrook Power Station, Glenbrook Beach, Clarks Beach
- Tributaries
  - left: Rangiwhea Creek, Awaruaiti Creek, Mokorau Creek, Parakau Creek, Totara Creek, Waipipi Creek, Te Hakono Creek, Pukewhau Creek, Kohonui Creek, Ohiku Creek
  - right: Waitangi Stream, Ruakohua Stream, Taihiki River

The Waiuku River, also known as the Waiuku Estuary, is an estuarial arm of the Manukau Harbour, near the town of Waiuku, south-west of Auckland. It joins the harbour at the south west and extends south for 12 kilometres (7 mi), having its head close to the town of Waiuku. What is now Waiuku Stream, a tributary rising about 2 km (1.2 mi) west of Waiuku, was once shown on maps as Waiuku River.

== Portage and proposed canal ==
Te Pai o Kaiwaka, also known as the Awaroa or Waiuku portage, connected the Manukau Harbour to the Waikato River in the south, via the Waiuku and Awaroa Rivers. A canal linking Manukau and the Waikato River was being considered as early as 1866. In 1921 a Royal Commission reported against a £475,000, 6 mi (9.7 km) canal, with the then predicted use. It would have included a cutting up to 70 ft (21 m) deep and a 450 ft (140 m) long bank at the Needles, with a 150 ft (46 m) x 30 ft (9.1 m) x 8 ft (2.4 m) barge lock in it and a road across the top. The canal continued to be mooted as an idea, and in 1924 the Waiuku Canal League was formed to promote it. It was again considered in 1965.

== Vegetation ==
Mangrove cover in the Waiuku and Taihiki estuaries increased from 60 ha (150 acres) in 1976 to 274 in 2006.

== Gallery ==
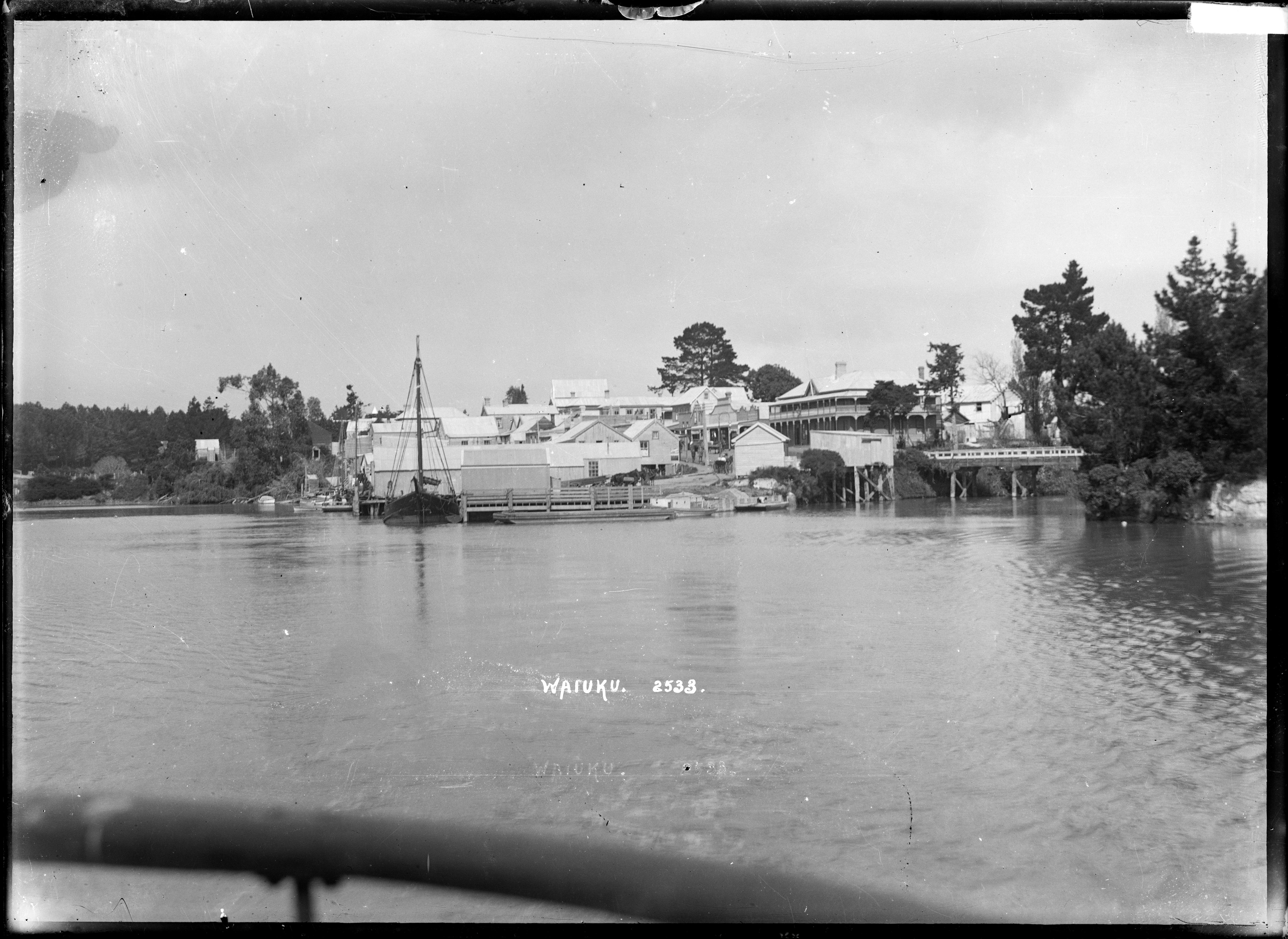
Buildings along the edge of the Waiuku River (circa 1911)

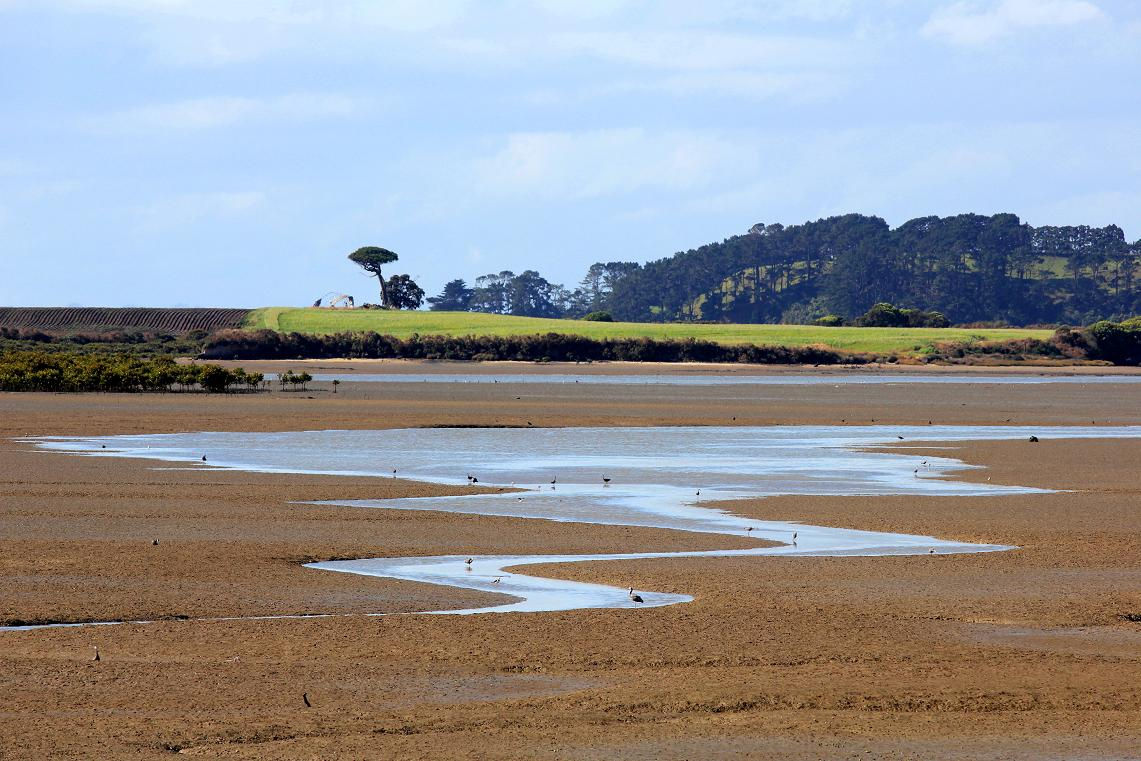
The Waiuku River at low tide in 2000
