= Waiuku and Mission Bush Branches =

Railway branch in Auckland

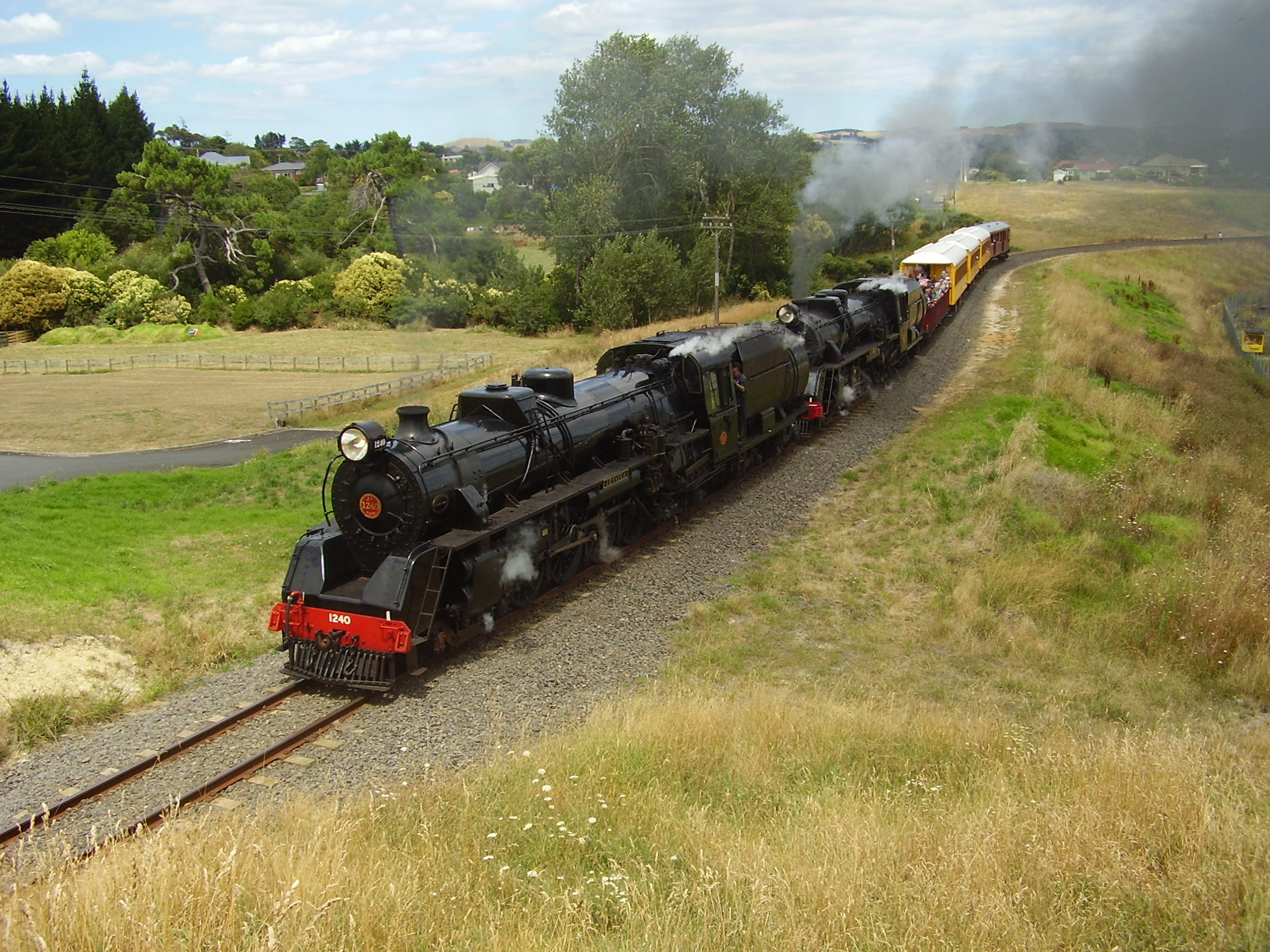
- NZR J^{A} class locomotives on the Glenbrook Vintage Railway near Waiuku

Overview
- Status: Open to Mission Bush, Waiuku branch partially open as Glenbrook Vintage Railway (GVR)
- Owner: KiwiRail
- Termini: Paerātā; Mission Bush (Glenbrook Steel Mill) Waiuku (GVR)

Service
- Operator(s): KiwiRail (to Mission Bush)
- Rolling stock: None

History
- Opened: 10 May 1922 (Waiuku); 7 October 1968 (Mission Bush)
- Closed: 31 December 1967 (Glenbrook to Waiuku)

Technical
- Line length: 17.09 km (10.62 mi) Pukekohe - Mission Bush; 18.08 km (11.23 mi) Pukekohe - Waiuku
- Number of tracks: Single
- Character: Rural
- Track gauge: 1,067 mm (3 ft 6 in)

Map

The Waiuku and Mission Bush Branches are two branches on the New Zealand railway network which are closely linked. The Mission Bush Branch connects the North Island Main Trunk railway to the Glenbrook Steel Mill.

== History ==
Proposed as early as 1880, and surveyed along a more southerly alignment in 1883, the branch line to Waiuku was finally authorised in 1912, following the election of William Massey, the local MP for Waiuku, as Prime Minister. The first sod was turned on 19 February 1914, in a ceremony at Waiuku. Progress was slow, and the branch did not open until 5 January 1922, with more work to finish until the line was fully open. The line was not very profitable, and passenger services were withdrawn on 17 July 1948, being replaced by buses.

In 1966 it was announced a new 5.5 km (3.4 mi) spur line would be built from Glenbrook to the New Zealand Steel steel mill at Mission Bush. Traffic continued to decline, until the line was closed on 31 December 1967 to Waiuku. The construction of the steel mill was the line's saviour. The spur line to the steel mill was opened on 7 October 1968.

The remaining section from Glenbrook to Waiuku was in the process of being lifted until it was taken over by the Glenbrook Vintage Railway (GVR). The line has been extended into Waiuku following the old branch as far as the last curve where it deviates. The line presently terminates at Victoria Avenue in Waiuku, a short walk from the centre of the town, with plans the eventually terminate the line at the Tamakai reserve, next to the old wharf.

The extension to Victoria Ave was completed by Easter of 2010 with the first passenger carrying train running on the line on 3 April 2010, hauled by J^{A} 1250. The extension was officially opened to the public on Labour Weekend (23 October 2010) by Kevin Lawrence, former Waiuku Borough Mayor, and Len Brown, Mayor of Auckland.

=== Stations ===
Helvetia and Patumāhoe opened on 10 December 1917, Mauku on 15 July 1918 for goods and on 10 May 1922 for passengers, when all the other stations opened.

Station	Distance from Paerātā North Junction	Height above sea level	Closed	Notes
Helvetia	2.63 km (1.63 mi)	64 m (210 ft)	20 October 1958	15 ft (4.6 m) x 9 ft (2.7 m) shelter, platform, loading bank and sheep yards.
Patumāhoe	5.95 km (3.70 mi)	67 m (220 ft)	17 April 1970 (then wagon loads only)	station building (sold to GVR 1971 for $20), 40 ft (12 m) x 30 ft (9.1 m) goods shed (sold 1970), loading bank, cattle and sheep yards (removed 1968), urinals, 41 wagon passing loop. A 60 ft (18 m) x 20 ft (6.1 m) shed was built in 1943 for a State Vegetable project and a Railway House in 1946. In 1982 the siding was extended and a private siding added for G J & R Weck Ltd for fertiliser and timber.
Mauku	8.18 km (5.08 mi)	49 m (161 ft)	25 June 1966	shelter, 150 ft (46 m) platform, loading bank, 33 wagon passing loop.
Glenbrook	10.98 km (6.82 mi)	69 m (226 ft)	17 April 1970 (then wagon loads only) 20 June 1982	station building (sold to GVR 1971 for $20, moved in 1976), with ladies waiting room and lavatory, 220 ft (67 m) platform, 30 ft (9.1 m) x 20 ft (6.1 m) goods shed (sold 1970), loading bank, 35 wagon passing loop (removed 1948), stockyards added in 1937 (removed 1958).
Pukeoware	14.76 km (9.17 mi)	33 m (108 ft)	2 March 1959	shelter, 30 ft (9.1 m) x 20 ft (6.1 m) goods shed, cattle yards.
Fernleigh	16.76 km (10.41 mi)	32 m (105 ft)	1 January 1968	Ake Ake name changed to Fernleigh in 1916. 14 ft (4.3 m) x 9 ft (2.7 m) shelter.
Waiuku	18.76 km (11.66 mi)	16 m (52 ft)	1 January 1968	station building (to NZR plan 8855, class B, altered to make office 18 ft (5.5 m) x 16 ft (4.9 m) and lobby 16ft x 16ft, plus verandah and lamp room), 320 ft (98 m) platform, 60 ft (18 m) x 30 ft (9.1 m) goods shed, latrines, cattle yards, loading bank, engine shed and pit, 6,000 gallon water vat, windmill, hand pump, ash pit, 6 cottages (for stationmaster, guard, driver, fireman, 2 surfacemen).

== Services ==
Services currently consist of 3 returns trains per day from Huntly to the south. As well as 2 outbound trains, one to Auckland and one to Tauranga via Hamilton. Inbound trains include bulk lime and coal trains; outbound trains carry export steel to the Port of Tauranga.

== See also ==
- North Island Main Trunk Line
- North Auckland Line
- Newmarket Line
- Manukau Branch
- Onehunga Branch
- Riverhead Branch
