= Seagrove Aerodrome =

Former airport near Manukau Harbour, New Zealand

Coordinates: 37.091052°S 174.775715°E

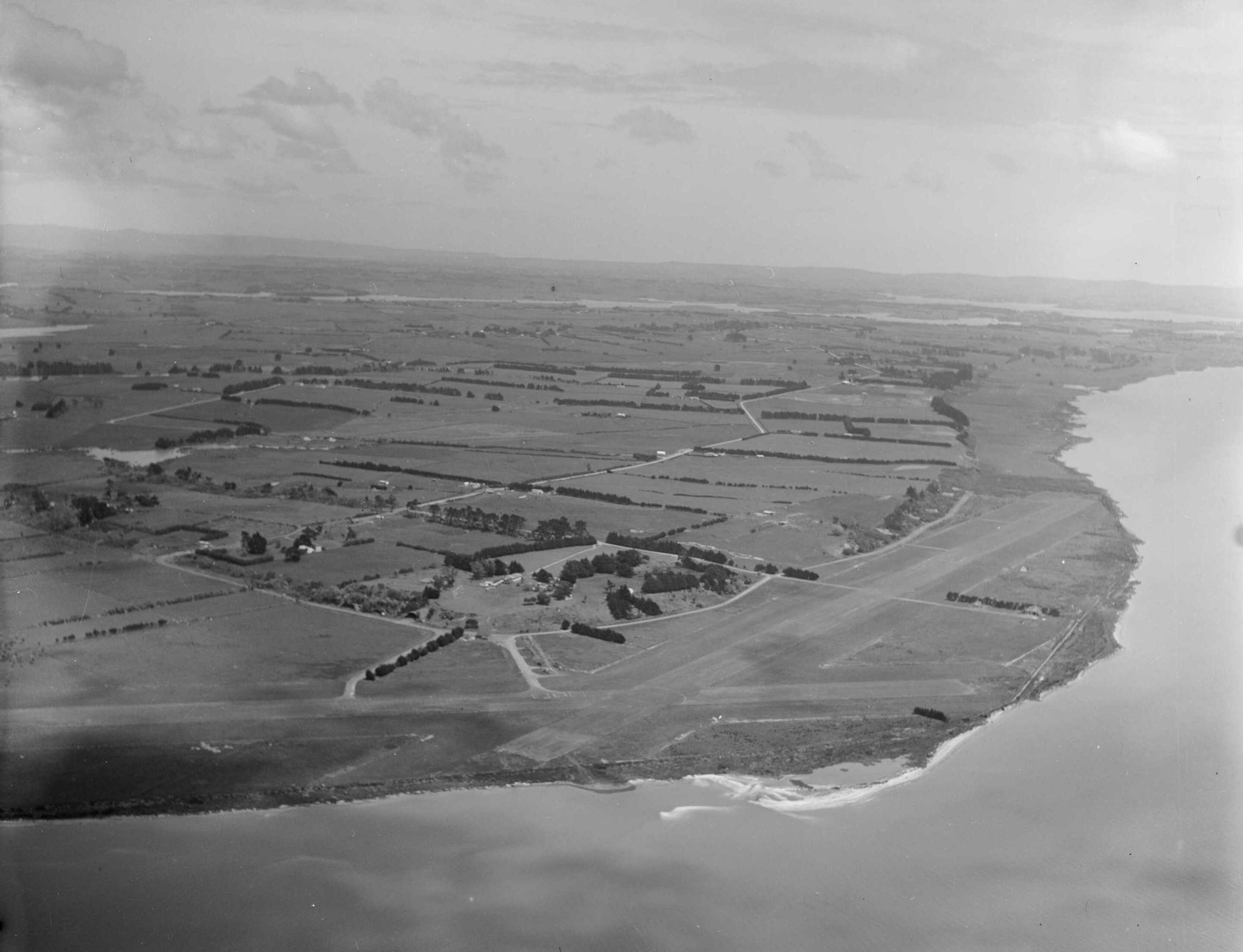
A view of Seagrove Aerodrome in 1946

Seagrove was an airport located by Clarks Beach on the south shoreline of Manukau Harbour, New Zealand, near the small town of Waiuku.

== World War Two ==
Seagrove aerodrome was built, after Japan's entry into World War II (with the sudden threat of invasion), in secret on commandeered private dairy farming land during World War II (1942) for the use of RNZAF and United States Marine Corps aircraft from Marine Aircraft Group 14. It was used initially for the air defence of Auckland. Originally it was to be named RNZAF Base Karaka, but as a good will gesture to the Clark family that gave up their farmland, retained the Homestead's name "Seagrove". Very few people knew of the base or its existence during the war, so well-guarded that airmen based at the nearby RNZAF Ardmore aerodrome would wonder why fighter aircraft would suddenly appear out of nowhere and disappear from view.

By 1943, the air force base was used as an auxiliary to the much larger bases at Mangere aerodrome (now Auckland International Airport) and Ardmore aerodrome. Curtiss P-40 Kittyhawk point defence fighters and Douglas SBD-3 (and SBD-4) dive bombers were both assembled and based there. Two paved cinder top runways, each approximately 5000 ft long and 150 ft wide, were built in a 'Boomerang' layout, one running west to east the other running nor'northeast to sou'southwest, central thresholds meeting at the apex of the Seagrove promontory at the mouth of the Waiau Pa inlet. Temporary barracks, dug in revetments and maintenance facilities were built. At the end of the conflict in 1945 the base was 'revealed' and closed but used for a short time as a surplus aircraft dump.

== Post-war ==
The base was returned to local (Clark family) land owners in the 1950s after being ruled out as a future site of a new Auckland international airport. Speedway enthusiasts used the runways for drag racing and speed time checks until the runway surfaces begin to deteriorate over time. There were plans to make the east–west runway into a certified drag racing strip but costs and the (then) isolated area saw enthusiasts move elsewhere.

Today the site is marked by a small plaque dedicated to those who served there and the runway layout is still discernible to aircraft approaching Auckland International Airport as well as on Google Earth. Access is limited as the site is now productive farmland and private property. Such was the secrecy of this base, to this day most people in the area know very little of its existence.
