= Grahams Beach =

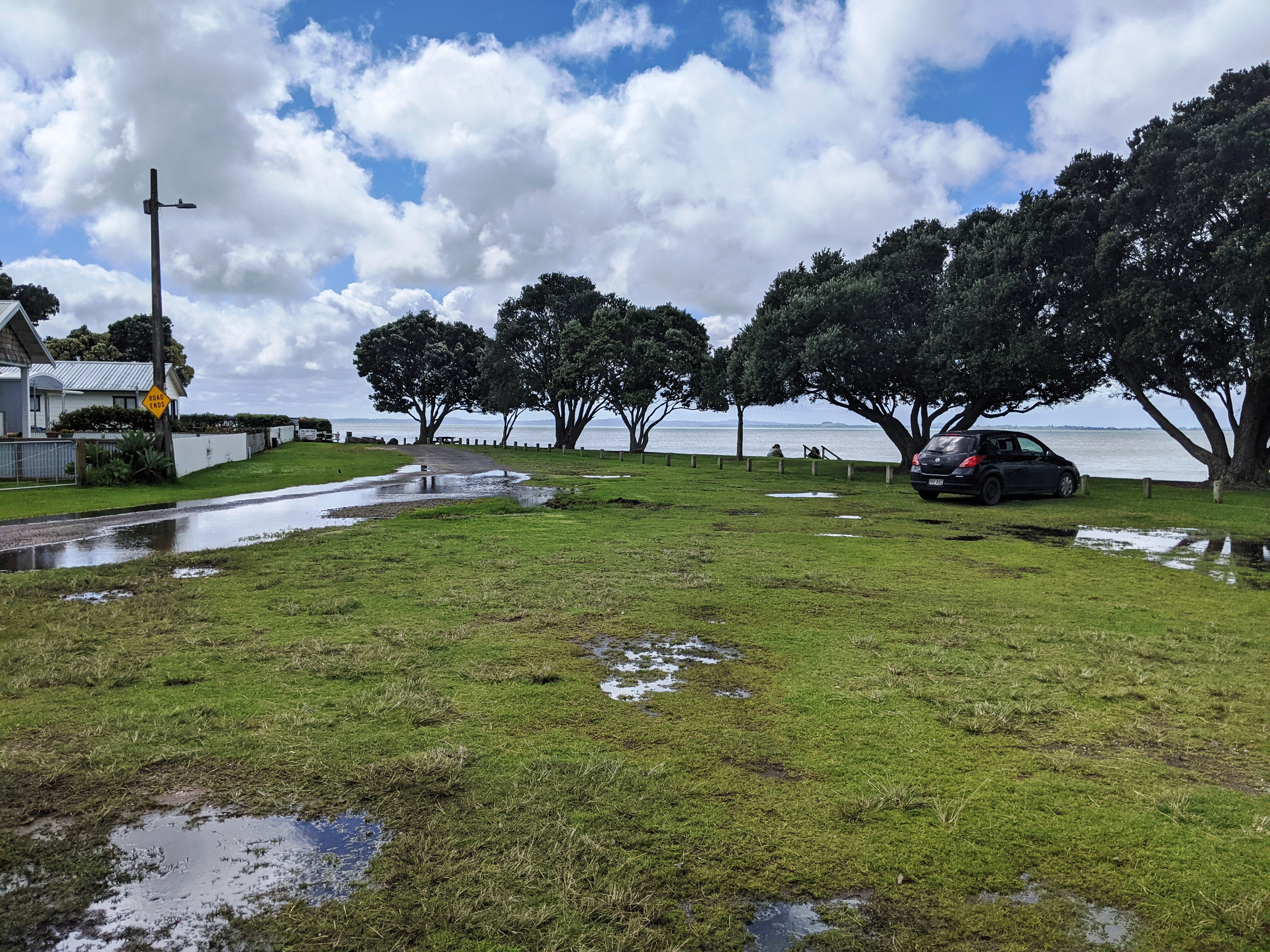
- The reserve at Grahams Beach
- Interactive map of Grahams Beach
- Coordinates: 37.056°S 174.666°E
- Country: New Zealand
- Region: Auckland Region
- Ward: Franklin ward
- Community board: Franklin Local Board
- Electorates: Port Waikato; Hauraki-Waikato

Government
  - Territorial Authority: Auckland Council
  - Mayor of Auckland: Wayne Brown
  - Port Waikato MP: Andrew Bayly
  - Hauraki-Waikato MP: Hana-Rawhiti Maipi-Clarke

Area
  - Total: 4.28 km^{2} (1.65 sq mi)

Population (June 2025)
  - Total: 120
  - Density: 28/km^{2} (73/sq mi)

Grahams Beach is a rural settlement on the northern tip of the Āwhitu Peninsula and south coast of the Manukau Harbour in the Auckland Region of New Zealand. The settlement as described by Statistics New Zealand also includes Big Bay.

Once known as Graham's Beach, it was on a ferry route between Waiuku and Onehunga in 1895. A wharf was built in about 1903. A primary school flourished in Graham's Beach around 1927. It closed in 1949 when rural schools in the area were consolidated to Awhitu District School.

== Demographics ==
Statistics New Zealand describes Big Bay-Grahams Beach as a rural settlement, which covers 4.28 km^{2} (1.65 sq mi) and had an estimated population of 120 as of June 2025, with a population density of 28 people per km^{2}. Grahams Beach is part of the larger Āwhitu statistical area.

Historical population
Year	Pop.	±% p.a.
2006	150	—
2013	90	−7.04%
2018	93	+0.66%
2023	120	+5.23%
The 2006 population is for a larger area of 8.68 km^{2}, including Orua Bay. Source:

Big Bay-Grahams Beach had a population of 120 in the 2023 New Zealand census, an increase of 27 people (29.0%) since the 2018 census, and an increase of 30 people (33.3%) since the 2013 census. There were 57 males and 60 females in 63 dwellings. The median age was 62.3 years (compared with 38.1 years nationally). There were 6 people (5.0%) aged under 15 years, 6 (5.0%) aged 15 to 29, 54 (45.0%) aged 30 to 64, and 51 (42.5%) aged 65 or older.

People could identify as more than one ethnicity. The results were 95.0% European (Pākehā), 15.0% Māori, 2.5% Asian, and 5.0% other, which includes people giving their ethnicity as "New Zealander". English was spoken by 100.0%, and other languages by 2.5%. The percentage of people born overseas was 15.0, compared with 28.8% nationally.

Religious affiliations were 35.0% Christian. People who answered that they had no religion were 55.0%, and 5.0% of people did not answer the census question.

Of those at least 15 years old, 15 (13.2%) people had a bachelor's or higher degree, 69 (60.5%) had a post-high school certificate or diploma, and 33 (28.9%) people exclusively held high school qualifications. The median income was $28,300, compared with $41,500 nationally. 6 people (5.3%) earned over $100,000 compared to 12.1% nationally. The employment status of those at least 15 was that 39 (34.2%) people were employed full-time and 12 (10.5%) were part-time.
