= Glenbrook Power Station =

Power station in Glenbrook, New Zealand

Coordinates: 37°12′27″S 174°43′41″E

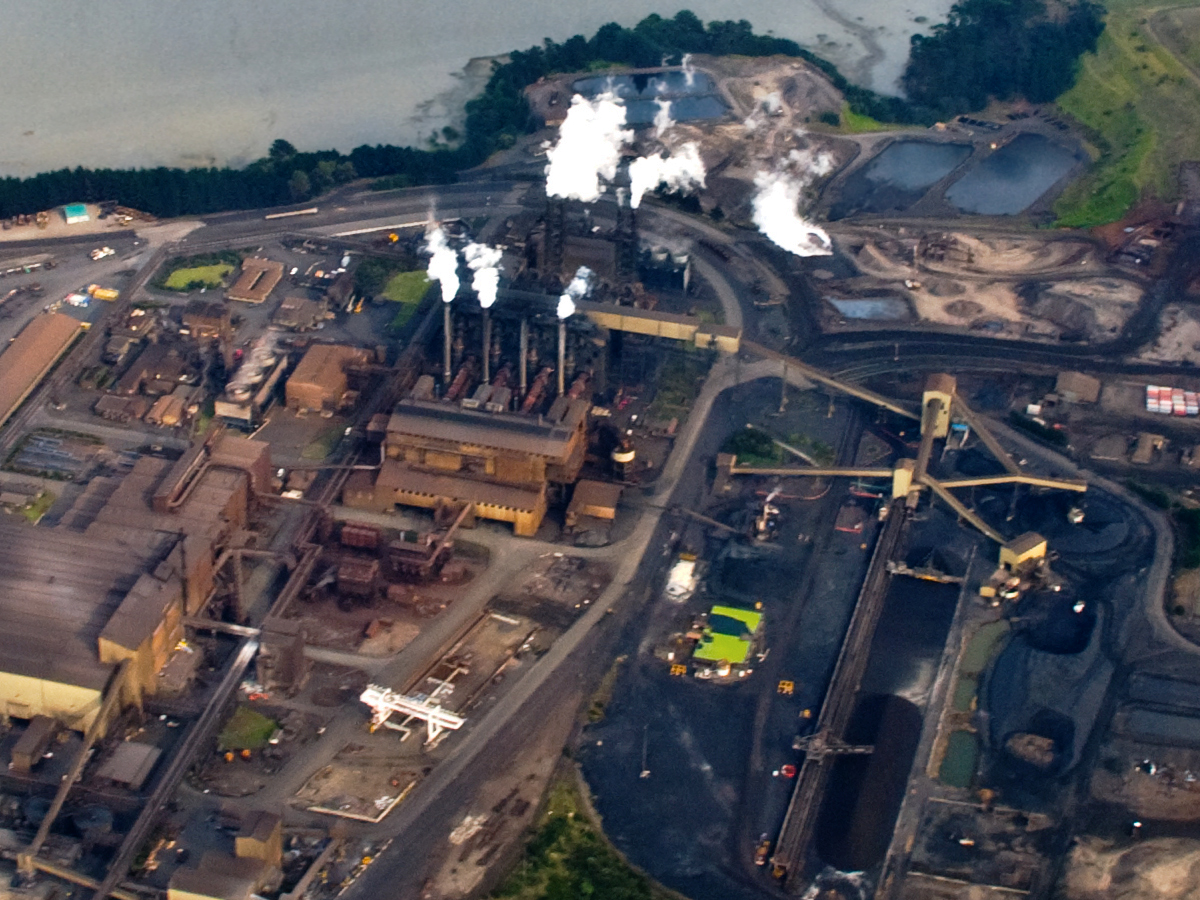
Aerial view of the Glenbrook Steel Mill complex (2008)

Glenbrook Power Station is a 112MW co-generation plant located at Glenbrook, south of Auckland, New Zealand. Fully integrated into the New Zealand Steel plant, and enables New Zealand Steel to optimise its energy costs. Surplus natural gas from the iron-making direct reduction kilns are used to generate electricity. Since this partnership reduces the energy consumed in the New Zealand Energy Market (NZEM) – and potentially generated from fossil-fuel burning power stations – it also reduces carbon emissions.

Two cogeneration plants commissioned in 1987 and 1997.

== See also ==
- Alinta Energy
