= Mangere Aerodrome =

Historic aerodrome previously on the site of Auckland Airport

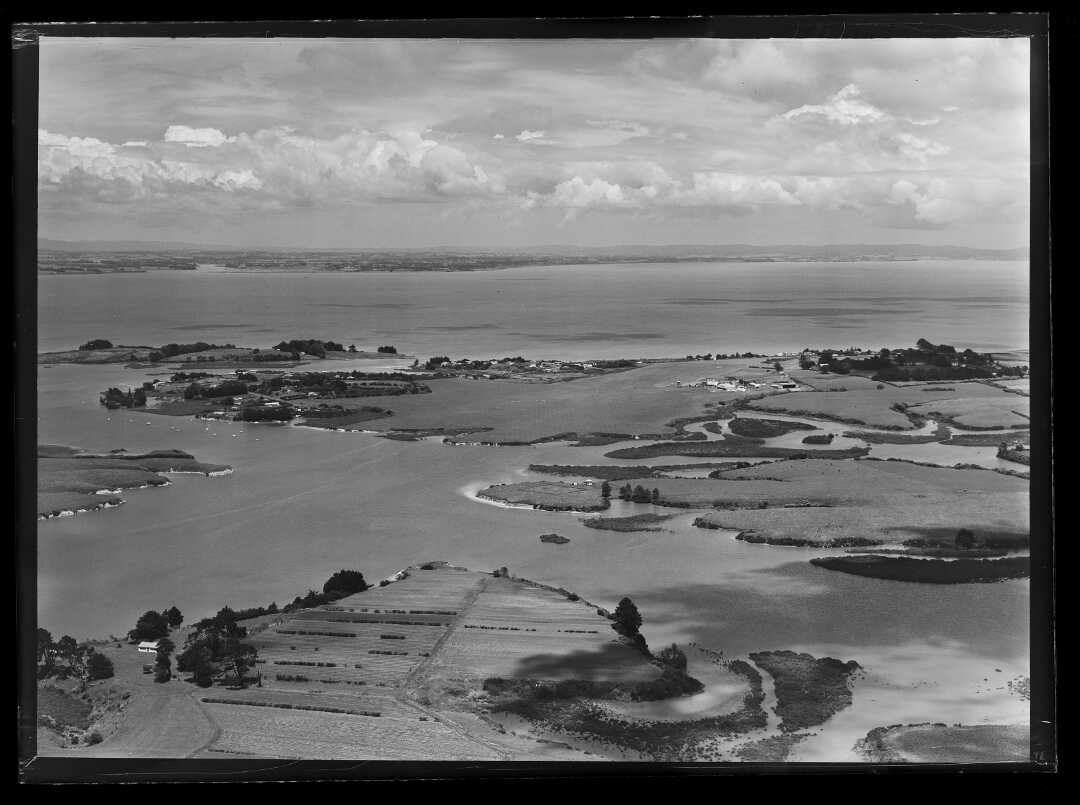
The Mangere Aerodrome, pictured in 1958.

Mangere Aerodrome, named after a nearby suburb, was the original home of the Auckland Aero Club. It is now the site of Auckland Airport. Mangere Aerodrome's claim to fame was as the arrival point for New Zealand aviator, and aeroclub member, Jean Batten's solo flight from the United Kingdom in 1936. The RNZAF requisitioned the aerodrome from 1939 until 1944, renaming it RNZAF Station Mangere. In 1961, the Auckland Aero Club moved to Ardmore aerodrome and Mangere Aerodrome closed. The new Auckland Airport opened in 1965.

== Early years ==
Auckland Aero Club formed in 1928, and began operating from farmland at Māngere near the Manukau Harbour, leased from a farmer named G. Peacock. The aero club allowed aircraft owners a place to enjoy their 'hobby' without offending the residents of Auckland.

Sir Charles Kingsford Smith visited the Mangere Aerodrome on 18 September 1928, after completing his 1928 Trans-Tasman flight to Christchurch. In 1933 a concrete circle was created to guide landings.

In October 1936, Jean Batten was met by a crowd of 6,000 people at the Mangere Aerodrome, after completing her solo flight from England to New Zealand in 11 days and 45 minutes; a record that stood for 45 years.

In 1936 passenger air travel was inaugurated by Union Airways from Mangere as part of the fledgling main trunk air route linking Auckland with Wellington and Christchurch. Union Airways built a large hangar to house its Lockheed Electra and de Havilland Express airliners, also building a comfortable passenger terminal building of the era. The 1936 plan was for 3 runways, the longest being 750 yards (690 m). The Public Works Department laid a scoria runway for the service in 1937.

Mangere Aerodrome's claim to fame was when it was the arrival point for New Zealand aviator, and aeroclub member, Jean Batten's solo flight from the United Kingdom in 1936.

== World War II ==
When war was declared in 1939, the RNZAF requisitioned the aerodrome, renaming it RNZAF Station Mangere. The grass runway was extended to handle large aircraft up to Boeing B-17 Flying Fortress size. The Air Force used the aerodrome for Flight Instructor training until 1940. The No1 Anti-Aircraft Operating Flight was also based there amongst other wartime operational units. Squadrons from surrounding Manukau Harbour bases such as Ardmore and Seagrove were regular visitors along with aircraft from United States Armed Forces.

Severely restricted civilian air services by Union Airways continued to operate throughout the conflict. The RNZAF returned the aerodrome to the Auckland Aero Club in 1944 after Allied forces had gained the upper hand in the Pacific Theater of War.

== Later years ==
The aerodrome carried on with flying post war with flight training and general aeroclub activities. Passenger services from Mangere ended in 1947 when the newly nationalised airline, NAC was forced to move to the joint Air Force and Civilian airport at Whenuapai. At the time international flying operations were located at Mechanics Bay for flying boats and Whenuapai Air Force base for land based aircraft using a civilian terminal.

In 1948 Mangere Aerodrome was short listed along with others as a possible future site of an overseas international landbased airport. In 1956, the aerodrome was chosen as the site of Auckland International Airport, due to its isolation from major built up urban areas with the prospect of jet transport on the horizon. In February 1961, with preliminary construction underway, the Auckland Aero Club moved to Ardmore aerodrome and Mangere Aerodrome closed. The new Auckland Airport opened in 1965.
