= List of regions of New Zealand by GDP =

This is a list of regions of New Zealand by nominal GDP, in New Zealand dollar and US dollars in 2024.

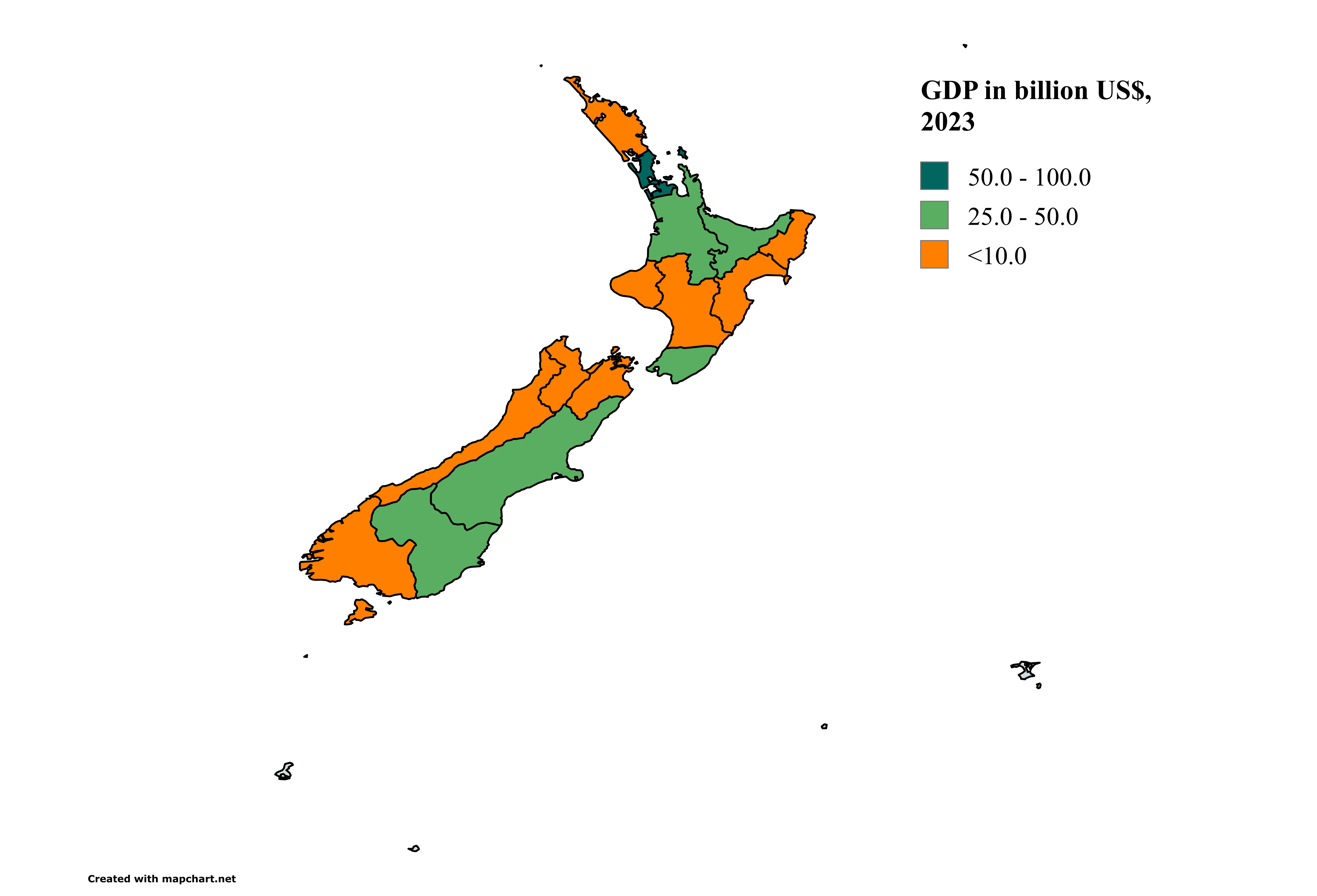
GDP in billion US$, 2023

Region	GDP (NZ$ billion)	GDP (US$ billion)	GDP per capita (NZ$)	GDP per capita (US$)
Northland	11.178	6.707	54,796	32,877
Auckland	157.281	94.369	88,355	53,013
Waikato	36.474	21.884	68,598	41,158
Bay of Plenty	23.901	14.341	67,650	40,590
Gisborne	2.938	1.763	55,326	33,195
Hawke's Bay	11.993	7.196	64,935	38,961
Taranaki	11.140	6.684	85,362	51,217
Manawatū-Whanganui	15.683	9.410	59,834	35,900
Wellington	51.008	30.605	92,776	55,665
North Island	321.596	192.958	79,420	47,652
Tasman / Nelson (Note: Nelson and Tasman are combined by Statistics New Zealand, but are separate regions.)	7.630	4.578	66,293	39,775
Marlborough	4.383	2.630	84,296	50,577
West Coast	2.597	1.558	75,057	45,034
Canterbury (Note: Includes the Chatham Islands.)	51.675	31.005	74,772	44,863
Otago	18.226	10.936	71,113	42,667
Southland	8.839	5.303	83,620	50,172
South Island	93.350	56.010	74,395	44,637
New Zealand	414.946	248.968	78,233	46,939

== Modelled GDP by territorial authority ==
The following table shows the modelled GDP by territorial authority, according to the Ministry of Business, Innovation and Employment (MBIE).

Territorial authority	GDP (NZ$ billion)	GDP per capita (NZ$)
Far North district	3.202	42,783
Whangarei district	6.735	66,022
Kaipara district	1.242	45,715
Auckland	157.281	88,355
Thames-Coromandel district	1.319	40,032
Hauraki district	0.972	43,680
Waikato district	3.792	41,547
Matamata-Piako district	2.764	70,140
Hamilton city	18.054	94,871
Waipa district	3.365	54,249
Otorohanga district	0.557	51,416
South Waikato district	1.476	56,240
Waitomo district	0.708	70,478
Taupo district	3.223	75,704
Western Bay of Plenty district	2.864	47,304
Tauranga city	12.631	77,939
Rotorua district	5.382	69,156
Whakatane district	2.260	58,429
Kawerau district	0.466	60,162
Opotiki district	0.552	53,191
Gisborne district	2.938	55,330
Wairoa district	0.419	45,873
Hastings district	6.606	72,682
Napier city	4.205	61,642
Central Hawke's Bay district	0.755	46,197
New Plymouth district	7.808	86,430
Stratford district	0.463	44,486
South Taranaki district	2.876	96,122
Ruapehu district	0.777	57,072
Whanganui district	2.424	49,196
Rangitikei district	0.750	46,212
Manawatu district	1.394	41,268
Palmerston North city	8.041	87,899
Tararua district	0.876	45,645
Horowhenua district	1.409	36,806
Kapiti Coast district	1.985	33,832
Porirua city	2.903	46,292
Upper Hutt city	1.859	38,602
Lower Hutt city	7.298	63,709
Wellington city	34.586	161,766
Masterton district	1.507	51,887
Carterton district	0.444	42,406
South Wairarapa district	0.426	34,344
Tasman district	3.167	52,665
Nelson city	4.463	81,198
Marlborough district	4.383	84,288
Buller district	0.788	73,352
Grey district	1.228	84,487
Westland district	0.581	62,329
Kaikoura district	0.190	43,277
Hurunui district	0.779	54,658
Waimakariri district	2.425	34,913
Christchurch city	36.893	88,816
Selwyn district	3.617	42,699
Ashburton district	2.823	76,338
Timaru district	3.689	73,826
Mackenzie district	0.417	76,258
Waimate district	0.704	82,736
Waitaki district	1.738	70,224
Central Otago district	1.823	70,296
Queenstown-Lakes district	4.473	83,516
Dunedin city	9.024	66,866
Clutha district	1.306	68,424
Southland district	2.765	81,822
Gore district	0.995	75,156
Invercargill city	5.079	86,571
