= Glenbrook Beach =

Glenbrook Beach Kahawai
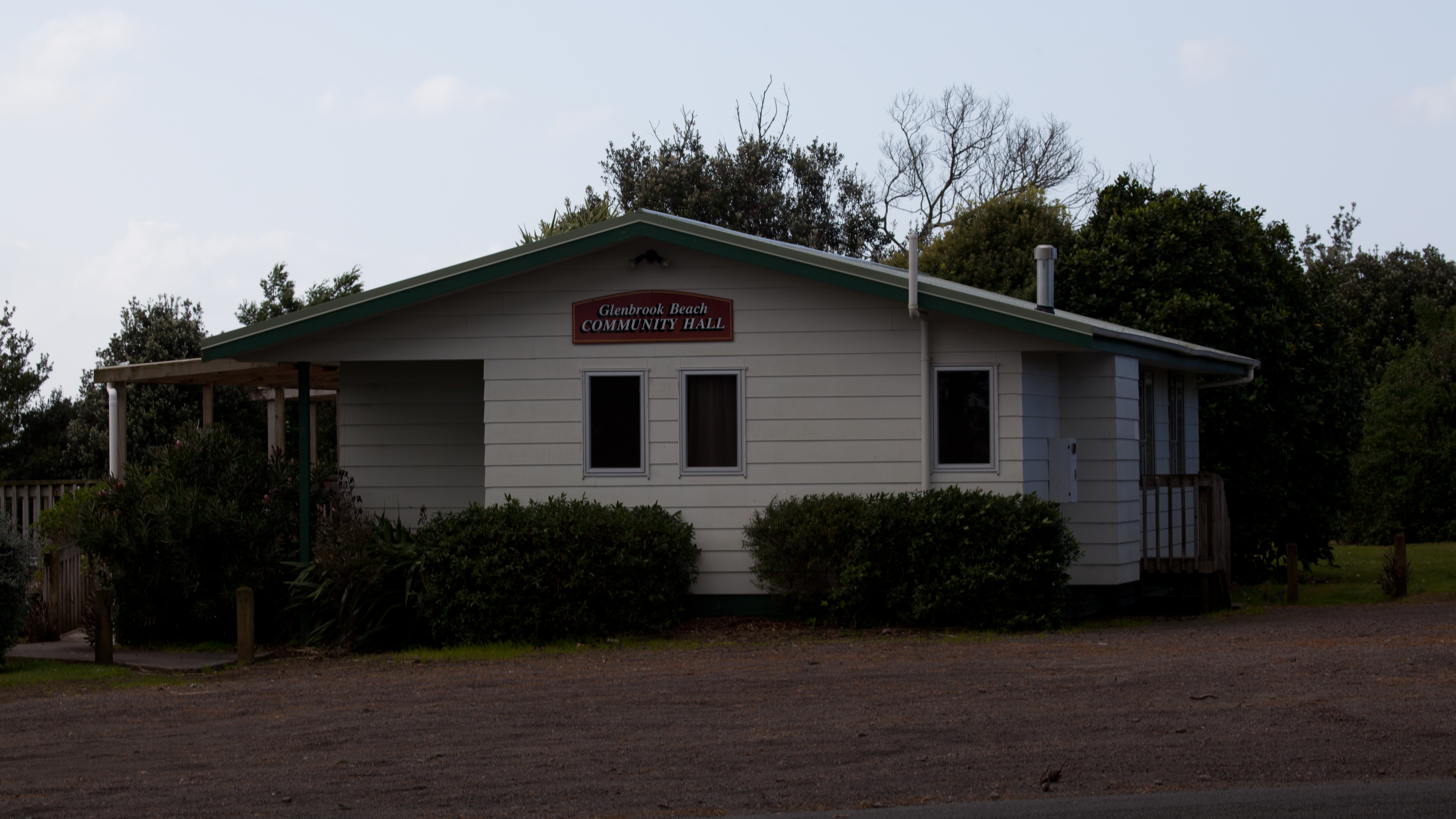
- Glenbrook Beach Community Hall
- Interactive map of Glenbrook Beach
- Coordinates: 37.163°S 174.713°E
- Country: New Zealand
- Region: Auckland Region
- Territorial authority: Auckland Council
- Ward: Franklin ward
- Board: Franklin Local Board
- Electorates: Port Waikato; Hauraki-Waikato

Area
  - Total: 1.17 km^{2} (0.45 sq mi)

Population (June 2025)
  - Total: 1,050
  - Density: 897/km^{2} (2,320/sq mi)
- Postcode: 2681
- Area code: 09

Glenbrook Beach is a rural community at the northern end of a peninsula formed between the Waiuku River and Taihiki River in Auckland, New Zealand. Waiuku is 14 km south by road.

The area is also known as Kahawai, after a species of fish which has been a substantial food source for the local Ngāti Te Ata iwi.

Glenbrook Beach was first subdivided in the mid 1920s. Electric power supply was connected at the end of the decade.

== Demographics ==
Statistics New Zealand describes Glenbrook Beach as a rural settlement, which covers 1.17 km^{2} (0.45 sq mi) and had an estimated population of 1,050 as of June 2025, with a population density of 897 people per km^{2}. Glenbrook Beach is part of the larger Glenbrook statistical area.

Historical population
Year	Pop.	±% p.a.
2006	276	—
2013	300	+1.20%
2018	303	+0.20%
2023	840	+22.62%
The 2006 population is for a smaller area of 0.43 km^{2}. Source:

Glenbrook Beach had a population of 840 in the 2023 New Zealand census, an increase of 537 people (177.2%) since the 2018 census, and an increase of 540 people (180.0%) since the 2013 census. There were 417 males, 417 females and 6 people of other genders in 294 dwellings. 2.5% of people identified as LGBTIQ+. The median age was 36.7 years (compared with 38.1 years nationally). There were 198 people (23.6%) aged under 15 years, 120 (14.3%) aged 15 to 29, 438 (52.1%) aged 30 to 64, and 84 (10.0%) aged 65 or older.

People could identify as more than one ethnicity. The results were 73.6% European (Pākehā); 14.3% Māori; 13.6% Pasifika; 14.3% Asian; 2.9% Middle Eastern, Latin American and African New Zealanders (MELAA); and 2.9% other, which includes people giving their ethnicity as "New Zealander". English was spoken by 96.1%, Māori language by 2.9%, Samoan by 2.5%, and other languages by 18.9%. No language could be spoken by 2.9% (e.g. too young to talk). New Zealand Sign Language was known by 0.4%. The percentage of people born overseas was 32.5, compared with 28.8% nationally.

Religious affiliations were 38.2% Christian, 3.9% Hindu, 1.8% Islam, 0.7% Māori religious beliefs, 0.4% Buddhist, 1.1% New Age, 0.4% Jewish, and 2.1% other religions. People who answered that they had no religion were 45.7%, and 5.4% of people did not answer the census question.

Of those at least 15 years old, 150 (23.4%) people had a bachelor's or higher degree, 375 (58.4%) had a post-high school certificate or diploma, and 126 (19.6%) people exclusively held high school qualifications. The median income was $58,300, compared with $41,500 nationally. 111 people (17.3%) earned over $100,000 compared to 12.1% nationally. The employment status of those at least 15 was that 411 (64.0%) people were employed full-time, 63 (9.8%) were part-time, and 12 (1.9%) were unemployed.
