= Ōrua Bay =

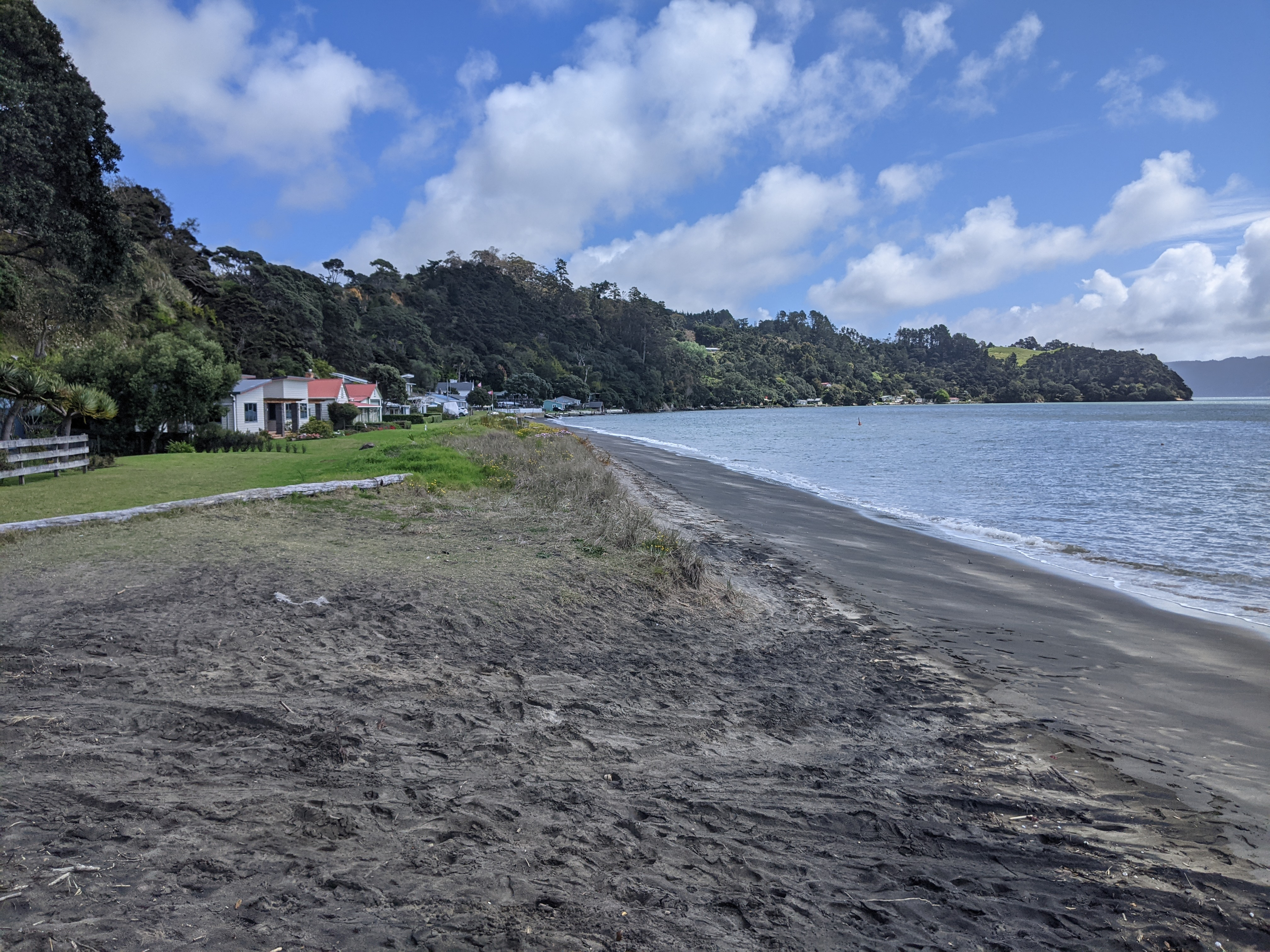
- East end of Ōrua Bay
- Interactive map of Ōrua Bay
- Coordinates: 37.050°S 174.610°E
- Country: New Zealand
- Region: Auckland Region
- Ward: Franklin ward
- Community board: Franklin Local Board
- Electorates: Port Waikato; Hauraki-Waikato (Māori)

Government
  - Territorial Authority: Auckland Council
  - Mayor of Auckland: Wayne Brown
  - Port Waikato MP: Andrew Bayly
  - Hauraki-Waikato MP: Hana-Rawhiti Maipi-Clarke

Area
  - Total: 0.85 km^{2} (0.33 sq mi)

Population (June 2025)
  - Total: 30
  - Density: 35/km^{2} (91/sq mi)

Ōrua Bay is a rural settlement on the northern tip of the Āwhitu Peninsula and south coast of the Manukau Harbour in the Auckland Region of New Zealand.

The name could mean 'place of a pit' in the Māori language, but could be a contraction of 'Oruarua', 'place of two minds' or 'in doubt'. The name became officially 'Ōrua Bay' in 2023.

== History ==
A Wesleyan Mission was opened by Reverend William Woon at Ōrua Bay in 1836, and the Church Missionary Society kept a station there from 1837 to 1844.

The area was called Coulthard's Bay after an early settler until the earlier name of Ōrua Bay was restored in 1886.

A primary school opened at Ōrua Bay in 1896 and closed in 1949 when rural schools in the area were consolidated to Awhitu District School.

During the 2023 Auckland Anniversary Weekend floods, a landslide collapsed a bach and resulted in five other dwellings being evacuated. Three people were injured.

== Demographics ==
Statistics New Zealand describes Orua Bay as a rural settlement, which covers 0.85 km^{2} (0.33 sq mi) and had an estimated population of 30 as of June 2025, with a population density of 7 people per km^{2}. Orua Bay is part of the larger Āwhitu statistical area.

Historical population
Year	Pop.	±% p.a.
2013	45	—
2018	36	−4.36%
2023	33	−1.73%

Orua Bay had a population of 33 in the 2023 New Zealand census, a decrease of 3 people (−8.3%) since the 2018 census, and a decrease of 12 people (−26.7%) since the 2013 census. There were 15 males and 15 females in 15 dwellings. The median age was 67.7 years (compared with 38.1 years nationally). There were 0 people (0.0%) aged under 15 years, 0 (0.0%) aged 15 to 29, 9 (27.3%) aged 30 to 64, and 21 (63.6%) aged 65 or older.

People could identify as more than one ethnicity. The results were 81.8% European (Pākehā), 9.1% Māori, and 18.2% other, which includes people giving their ethnicity as "New Zealander". English was spoken by 100.0%. The percentage of people born overseas was 18.2, compared with 28.8% nationally.

Religious affiliations were 27.3% Christian, and 9.1% Buddhist. People who answered that they had no religion were 54.5%, and 9.1% of people did not answer the census question.

Of those at least 15 years old, 12 (36.4%) people had a bachelor's or higher degree, 12 (36.4%) had a post-high school certificate or diploma, and 12 (36.4%) people exclusively held high school qualifications. The median income was $27,700, compared with $41,500 nationally. 3 people (9.1%) earned over $100,000 compared to 12.1% nationally. The employment status of those at least 15 was that 6 (18.2%) people were employed full-time and 3 (9.1%) were part-time.
