= Waiau Pā =

Waiau Pā Waiau Pā
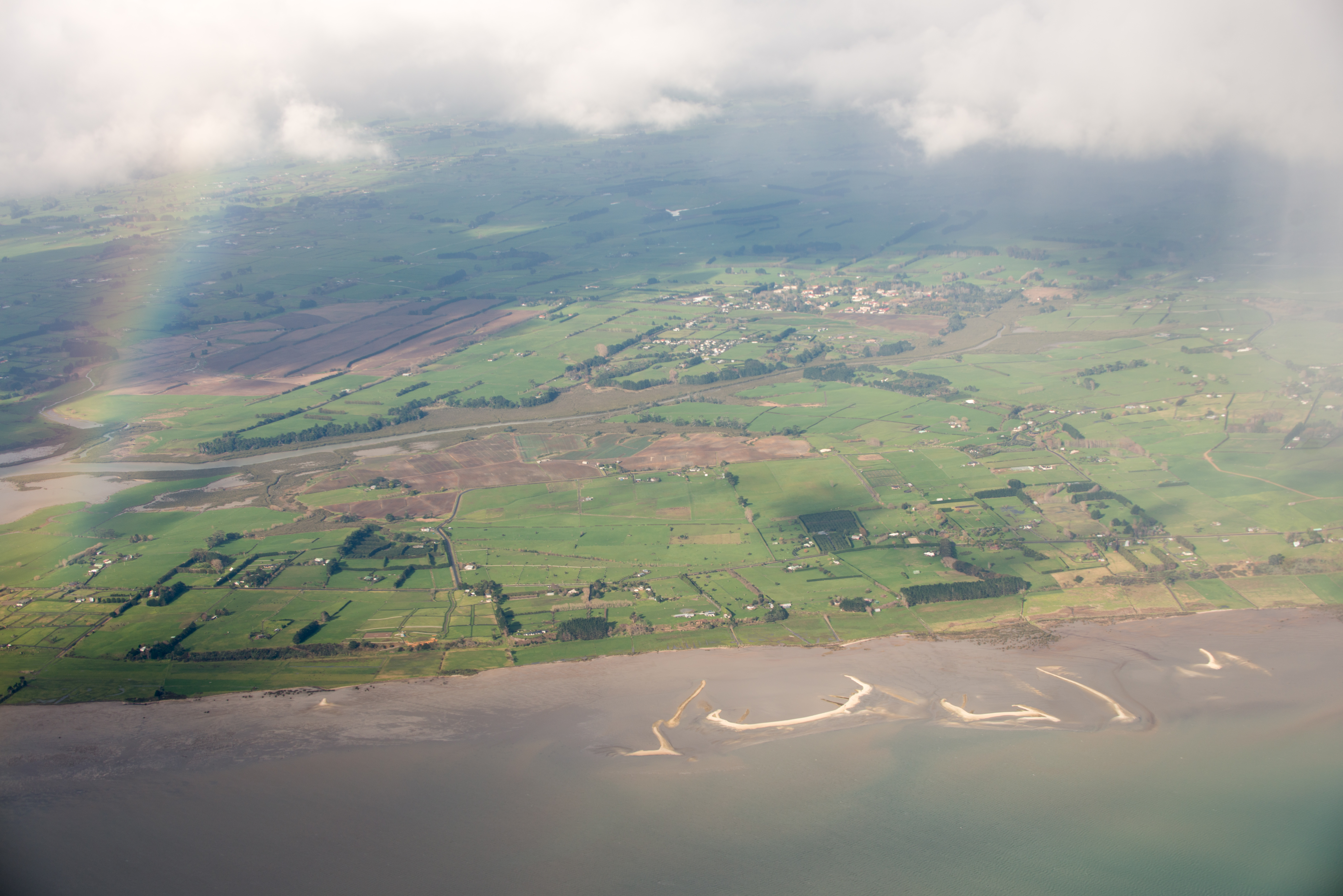
- Looking across Taihiki River to Waiau Pā
- Interactive map of Waiau Pā
- Coordinates: 37.138°S 174.753°E
- Country: New Zealand
- Region: Auckland Region
- Territorial authority: Auckland Council
- Ward: Franklin ward
- Board: Franklin Local Board
- Electorates: Port Waikato; Hauraki-Waikato

Government
  - Territorial Authority: Auckland Council
  - Mayor of Auckland: Wayne Brown
  - Port Waikato MP: Andrew Bayly
  - Hauraki-Waikato MP: Hana-Rawhiti Maipi-Clarke

Area
  - Total: 2.79 km^{2} (1.08 sq mi)

Population (June 2025)
  - Total: 510
  - Density: 180/km^{2} (470/sq mi)

Waiau Pā is a small settlement south of Auckland, New Zealand. It is in the Franklin Ward of Auckland Council. The word Waiau itself means "river of swirling currents" in the Māori language.

== Geography ==
The Taihiki River runs south and southwest of Waiau Pā, and the Manukau Harbour is to the north.

== History ==
The Waiau Pa Presbyterian Church on the corner of McKenzie Road and Seagrove Road was built in 1914.

== Demographics ==
Statistics New Zealand describes Waiau Pā as a rural settlement, which covers 2.79 km^{2} (1.08 sq mi) and had an estimated population of 510 as of June 2025, with a population density of 183 people per km^{2}. Waiau Pā is part of the larger Karaka Creek statistical area

Historical population for Waiau Pā
Year	Pop.	±% p.a.
2006	258	—
2013	327	+3.44%
2018	450	+6.59%
2023	480	+1.30%

Waiau Pā had a population of 480 in the 2023 New Zealand census, an increase of 30 people (6.7%) since the 2018 census, and an increase of 153 people (46.8%) since the 2013 census. There were 237 males and 243 females in 159 dwellings. 1.9% of people identified as LGBTIQ+. The median age was 45.0 years (compared with 38.1 years nationally). There were 90 people (18.8%) aged under 15 years, 66 (13.8%) aged 15 to 29, 249 (51.9%) aged 30 to 64, and 75 (15.6%) aged 65 or older.

People could identify as more than one ethnicity. The results were 85.0% European (Pākehā); 8.8% Māori; 3.8% Pasifika; 11.2% Asian; 1.2% Middle Eastern, Latin American and African New Zealanders (MELAA); and 3.8% other, which includes people giving their ethnicity as "New Zealander". English was spoken by 97.5%, Māori language by 1.9%, and other languages by 11.2%. No language could be spoken by 1.2% (e.g. too young to talk). New Zealand Sign Language was known by 0.6%. The percentage of people born overseas was 20.6, compared with 28.8% nationally.

Religious affiliations were 23.8% Christian, 2.5% Hindu, 0.6% Islam, and 4.4% other religions. People who answered that they had no religion were 61.2%, and 6.9% of people did not answer the census question.

Of those at least 15 years old, 69 (17.7%) people had a bachelor's or higher degree, 252 (64.6%) had a post-high school certificate or diploma, and 66 (16.9%) people exclusively held high school qualifications. The median income was $56,000, compared with $41,500 nationally. 90 people (23.1%) earned over $100,000 compared to 12.1% nationally. The employment status of those at least 15 was that 216 (55.4%) people were employed full-time, 60 (15.4%) were part-time, and 15 (3.8%) were unemployed.

=== Karaka Creek ===
Karaka Creek statistical area covers 35.04 km^{2} (13.53 sq mi) and had an estimated population of 1,710 as of June 2025, with a population density of 49 people per km^{2}.

Historical population for Karaka Creek
Year	Pop.	±% p.a.
2006	1,266	—
2013	1,356	+0.99%
2018	1,575	+3.04%
2023	1,611	+0.45%
The 2006 population is for a smaller area of 34.78 km^{2}. Source:

Karaka Creek had a population of 1,611 in the 2023 New Zealand census, an increase of 36 people (2.3%) since the 2018 census, and an increase of 255 people (18.8%) since the 2013 census. There were 822 males, 783 females and 3 people of other genders in 561 dwellings. 1.9% of people identified as LGBTIQ+. The median age was 46.3 years (compared with 38.1 years nationally). There were 285 people (17.7%) aged under 15 years, 222 (13.8%) aged 15 to 29, 798 (49.5%) aged 30 to 64, and 306 (19.0%) aged 65 or older.

People could identify as more than one ethnicity. The results were 87.2% European (Pākehā); 9.7% Māori; 4.1% Pasifika; 8.8% Asian; 1.1% Middle Eastern, Latin American and African New Zealanders (MELAA); and 1.7% other, which includes people giving their ethnicity as "New Zealander". English was spoken by 97.6%, Māori language by 0.9%, Samoan by 0.2%, and other languages by 10.2%. No language could be spoken by 1.1% (e.g. too young to talk). New Zealand Sign Language was known by 0.4%. The percentage of people born overseas was 19.9, compared with 28.8% nationally.

Religious affiliations were 28.7% Christian, 2.0% Hindu, 0.6% Islam, 0.6% Buddhist, 0.2% New Age, 0.2% Jewish, and 3.0% other religions. People who answered that they had no religion were 57.4%, and 8.0% of people did not answer the census question.

Of those at least 15 years old, 267 (20.1%) people had a bachelor's or higher degree, 780 (58.8%) had a post-high school certificate or diploma, and 282 (21.3%) people exclusively held high school qualifications. The median income was $52,900, compared with $41,500 nationally. 291 people (21.9%) earned over $100,000 compared to 12.1% nationally. The employment status of those at least 15 was that 729 (55.0%) people were employed full-time, 195 (14.7%) were part-time, and 36 (2.7%) were unemployed.

== Education ==
Waiau Pa School is a coeducational full primary school (years 1–8) with a roll of 342 as of July 2026. The school was founded in 1890, and held a reunion in 2015 to celebrate 125 years.

== Notable people ==
Supercars driver Matt Payne and F1 driver Liam Lawson both went to school at Waiau Pā.
