= Clarks Beach =

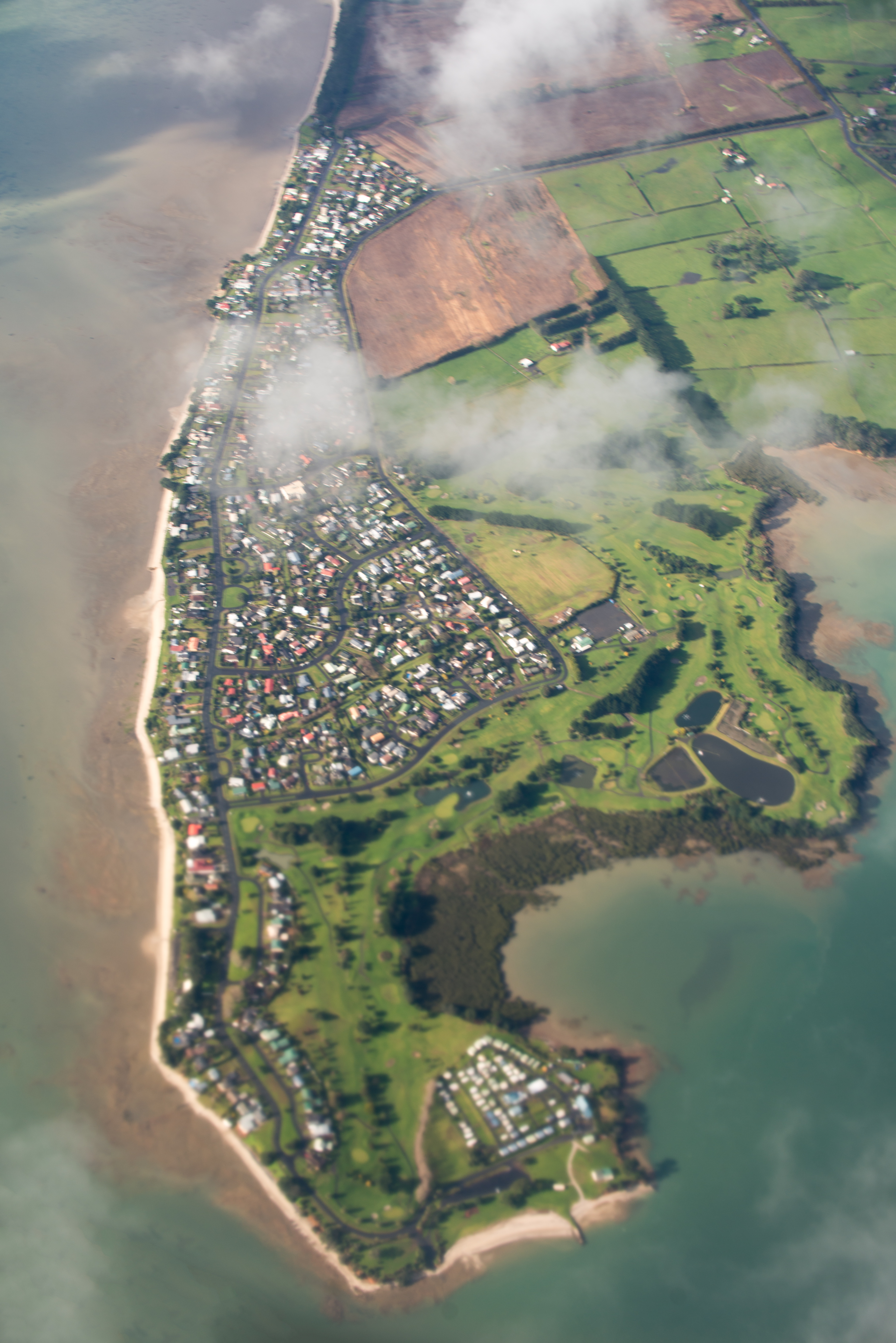
- Aerial view of Clarks Beach
- Interactive map of Clarks Beach
- Coordinates: 37.135°S 174.702°E
- Country: New Zealand
- Region: Auckland Region
- Territorial authority: Auckland Council
- Ward: Franklin ward
- Board: Franklin Local Board
- Electorates: Port Waikato; Hauraki-Waikato

Government
  - Territorial Authority: Auckland Council
  - Mayor of Auckland: Wayne Brown
  - Port Waikato MP: Andrew Bayly
  - Hauraki-Waikato MP: Hana-Rawhiti Maipi-Clarke

Area
  - Total: 2.41 km^{2} (0.93 sq mi)

Population (June 2025)
  - Total: 1,660
  - Density: 689/km^{2} (1,780/sq mi)

Clarks Beach is a small town of Auckland, New Zealand. It is in the former Franklin District local government area.

Primarily a beachside rural town, situated within the Manukau Harbour, at the mouth of the Waiuku River, it fronts the harbour and is north facing. It is known as one of the few beaches where scallops can be collected by hand at low tide.

About 50 ha immediately to the east of the existing town was rezoned to allow mixed housing in 2016. The Clarks Beach Waterfront Estate development started subsequently in 2019.

Seagrove aerodrome operated near Clarks Beach during World War II.

== Demographics ==
Stats NZ describes Clarks Beach as a small urban area. It covers 2.41 km^{2} (0.93 sq mi) and had an estimated population of 1,660 as of June 2025, with a population density of 689 people per km^{2}.

Historical population
Year	Pop.	±% p.a.
2006	1,368	—
2013	1,329	−0.41%
2018	1,392	+0.93%
2023	1,581	+2.58%

Clarks Beach had a population of 1,581 in the 2023 New Zealand census, an increase of 189 people (13.6%) since the 2018 census, and an increase of 252 people (19.0%) since the 2013 census. There were 804 males, 774 females and 3 people of other genders in 576 dwellings. 2.7% of people identified as LGBTIQ+. The median age was 45.0 years (compared with 38.1 years nationally). There were 285 people (18.0%) aged under 15 years, 237 (15.0%) aged 15 to 29, 726 (45.9%) aged 30 to 64, and 336 (21.3%) aged 65 or older.

People could identify as more than one ethnicity. The results were 83.3% European (Pākehā); 19.5% Māori; 7.8% Pasifika; 8.7% Asian; 0.8% Middle Eastern, Latin American and African New Zealanders (MELAA); and 1.9% other, which includes people giving their ethnicity as "New Zealander". English was spoken by 97.5%, Māori language by 3.2%, Samoan by 0.8%, and other languages by 9.5%. No language could be spoken by 1.9% (e.g. too young to talk). New Zealand Sign Language was known by 0.4%. The percentage of people born overseas was 22.6, compared with 28.8% nationally.

Religious affiliations were 30.9% Christian, 1.5% Hindu, 0.2% Islam, 0.2% Māori religious beliefs, 0.6% Buddhist, 0.4% New Age, and 1.7% other religions. People who answered that they had no religion were 56.0%, and 8.7% of people did not answer the census question.

Of those at least 15 years old, 267 (20.6%) people had a bachelor's or higher degree, 750 (57.9%) had a post-high school certificate or diploma, and 282 (21.8%) people exclusively held high school qualifications. The median income was $47,500, compared with $41,500 nationally. 198 people (15.3%) earned over $100,000 compared to 12.1% nationally. The employment status of those at least 15 was that 669 (51.6%) people were employed full-time, 165 (12.7%) were part-time, and 30 (2.3%) were unemployed.
