= Glenbrook, New Zealand =

Glenbrook
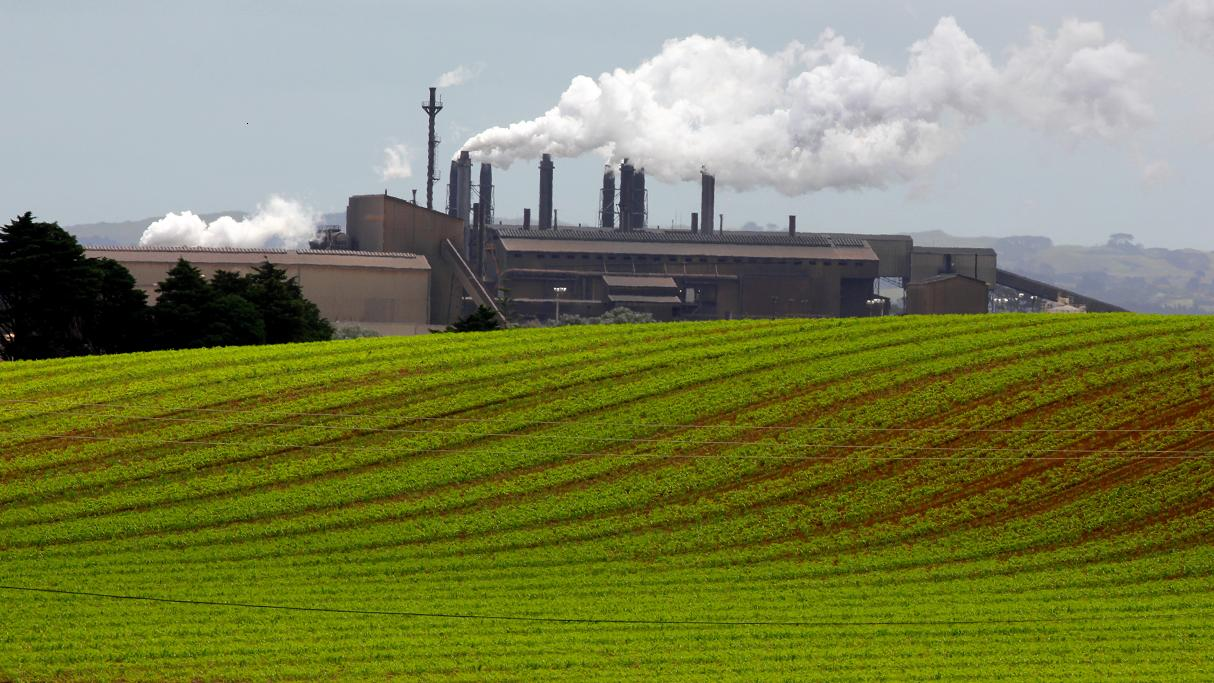
- The Glenbrook Steel Mill and surrounding farms
- Interactive map of Glenbrook
- Coordinates: 37°13′S 174°47′E
- Country: New Zealand
- Region: Auckland Region
- Ward: Franklin ward
- Board: Franklin Local Board
- Electorates: Port Waikato; Hauraki-Waikato

Government
  - Territorial Authority: Auckland Council

Area
  - Total: 53.16 km^{2} (20.53 sq mi)

Population (June 2025)
  - Total: 3,030
  - Density: 57.0/km^{2} (148/sq mi)

Glenbrook is a rural and industrial area in the Auckland region of New Zealand. The industrial area, that of New Zealand's major steel mill, New Zealand Steel, is not located close to any towns - the surrounding countryside is occupied by farms. The nearest towns are Waiuku, five kilometres to the south, and Pukekohe, 15 kilometres to the east.

Glenbrook's other claim to fame is the Glenbrook Vintage Railway.

== History ==
Construction of the Glenbrook Steel Mill began in 1967. Glenbrook was chosen as the site due to the area's proximity to the Waikato North Head ironsand mine and the Huntly Power Station.

== Demographics ==
Glenbrook statistical area, which includes Glenbrook Beach, covers 53.16 km^{2} (20.53 sq mi) and had an estimated population of 3,030 as of June 2025, with a population density of 57 people per km^{2}.

Historical population
Year	Pop.	±% p.a.
2006	1,974	—
2013	2,034	+0.43%
2018	2,193	+1.52%
2023	2,805	+5.05%

Glenbrook had a population of 2,805 in the 2023 New Zealand census, an increase of 612 people (27.9%) since the 2018 census, and an increase of 771 people (37.9%) since the 2013 census. There were 1,404 males, 1,389 females and 15 people of other genders in 951 dwellings. 2.8% of people identified as LGBTIQ+. The median age was 41.5 years (compared with 38.1 years nationally). There were 552 people (19.7%) aged under 15 years, 414 (14.8%) aged 15 to 29, 1,416 (50.5%) aged 30 to 64, and 423 (15.1%) aged 65 or older.

People could identify as more than one ethnicity. The results were 78.6% European (Pākehā); 13.0% Māori; 8.1% Pasifika; 12.4% Asian; 1.7% Middle Eastern, Latin American and African New Zealanders (MELAA); and 2.6% other, which includes people giving their ethnicity as "New Zealander". English was spoken by 96.1%, Māori language by 2.5%, Samoan by 1.4%, and other languages by 13.8%. No language could be spoken by 2.0% (e.g. too young to talk). New Zealand Sign Language was known by 0.3%. The percentage of people born overseas was 25.8, compared with 28.8% nationally.

Religious affiliations were 29.5% Christian, 2.0% Hindu, 1.8% Islam, 0.4% Māori religious beliefs, 0.5% Buddhist, 0.5% New Age, and 1.7% other religions. People who answered that they had no religion were 56.0%, and 7.4% of people did not answer the census question.

Of those at least 15 years old, 420 (18.6%) people had a bachelor's or higher degree, 1,293 (57.4%) had a post-high school certificate or diploma, and 537 (23.8%) people exclusively held high school qualifications. The median income was $49,400, compared with $41,500 nationally. 393 people (17.4%) earned over $100,000 compared to 12.1% nationally. The employment status of those at least 15 was that 1,314 (58.3%) people were employed full-time, 291 (12.9%) were part-time, and 51 (2.3%) were unemployed.

== Education ==
Glenbrook School is a coeducational full primary school (years 1–8) with a roll of 299 as of July 2026. The school opened in 1878.
