= Patumāhoe =

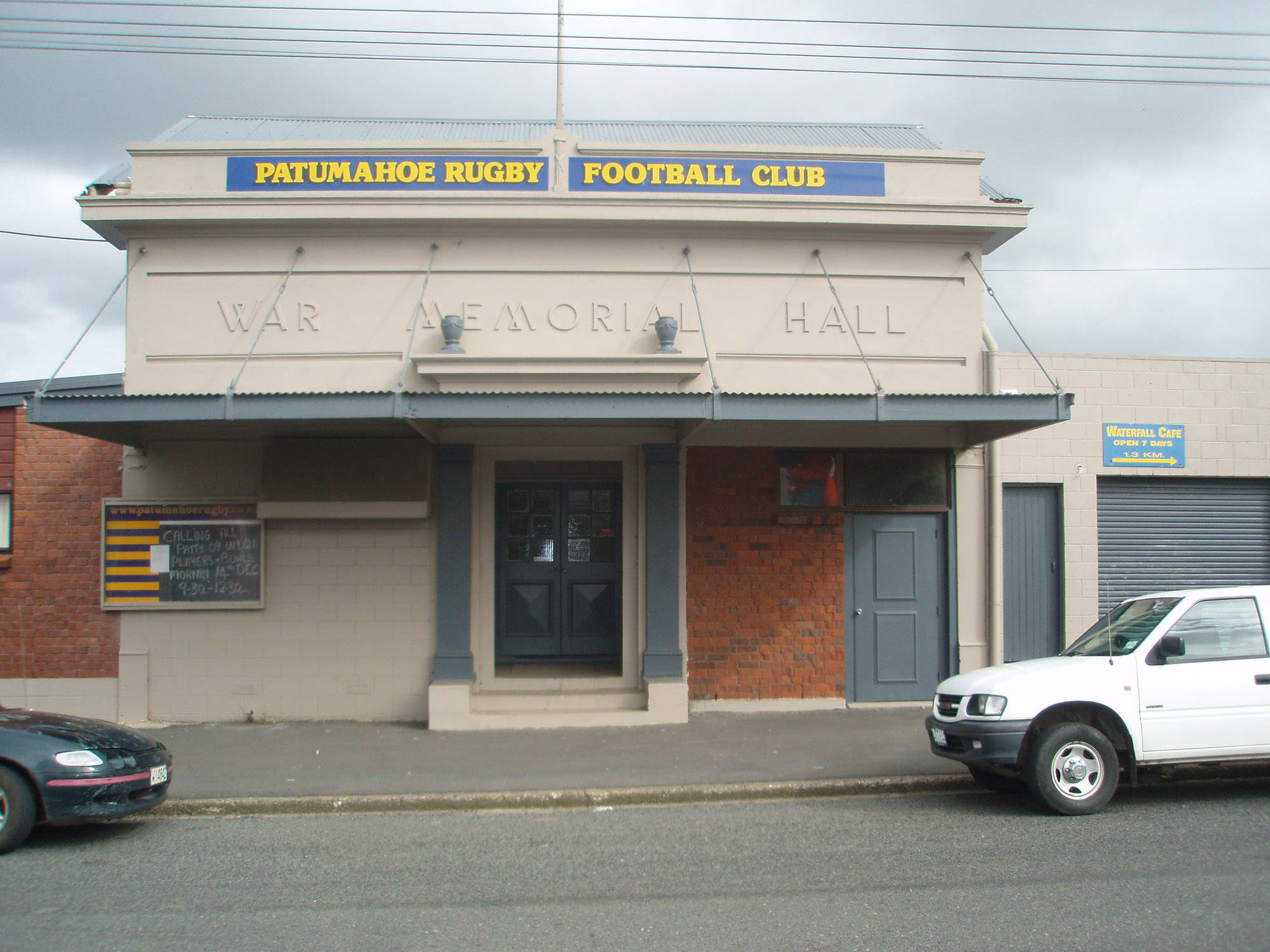
- The Patumahoe War Memorial Hall
- Interactive map of Patumāhoe
- Coordinates: 37.187°S 174.828°E
- Country: New Zealand
- Region: Auckland Region
- Ward: Franklin ward
- Board: Franklin Local Board
- Electorates: Port Waikato; Hauraki-Waikato

Government
  - Territorial authority: Auckland Council

Area
  - Total: 1.82 km^{2} (0.70 sq mi)

Population (June 2025)
  - Total: 1,460
  - Density: 802/km^{2} (2,080/sq mi)
- Postcode(s): 2679
- Area code: 09

Patumāhoe is a small town of Auckland, New Zealand. It is in the Franklin Ward of Auckland Council.

== Etymology ==
The name comes from the Māori patu māhoe, meaning "to strike or kill with a patu (club) made of wood from the māhoe plant".

The name of the town was officially changed to use the macron in 2023.

== History ==
In October, 1860 a Māori by the name of Eriata was found shot dead. Wiremu Tamehana prevented Māori from seeking revenge and the Anglican missionaries George Augustus Selwyn, Arthur Purchas, and Robert Maunsell managed to de-escalate tensions. Eriata's death was accidental and self-inflicted, although this was not known until after tensions had been de-escalated.

== Demographics ==
Patumāhoe is described by Statistics New Zealand as a small urban area and covers 1.82 km^{2} (0.70 sq mi). It had an estimated population of 1,460 as of June 2025, with a population density of 523 people per km^{2}.

Historical population for Patumahoe urban area
Year	Pop.	±% p.a.
2006	555	—
2013	660	+2.51%
2018	1,176	+12.25%
2023	1,365	+3.03%

Patumāhoe urban area had a population of 1,365 in the 2023 New Zealand census, an increase of 189 people (16.1%) since the 2018 census, and an increase of 705 people (106.8%) since the 2013 census. There were 666 males, 696 females and 3 people of other genders in 435 dwellings. 1.8% of people identified as LGBTIQ+. The median age was 38.6 years (compared with 38.1 years nationally). There were 333 people (24.4%) aged under 15 years, 186 (13.6%) aged 15 to 29, 645 (47.3%) aged 30 to 64, and 198 (14.5%) aged 65 or older.

People could identify as more than one ethnicity. The results were 88.6% European (Pākehā); 8.8% Māori; 6.6% Pasifika; 6.8% Asian; 0.4% Middle Eastern, Latin American and African New Zealanders (MELAA); and 2.4% other, which includes people giving their ethnicity as "New Zealander". English was spoken by 97.1%, Māori language by 1.1%, Samoan by 0.7%, and other languages by 7.9%. No language could be spoken by 1.8% (e.g. too young to talk). The percentage of people born overseas was 19.8, compared with 28.8% nationally.

Religious affiliations were 31.4% Christian, 1.1% Hindu, 0.4% Islam, 0.4% Māori religious beliefs, 0.2% Buddhist, 0.2% New Age, and 2.0% other religions. People who answered that they had no religion were 55.8%, and 8.4% of people did not answer the census question.

Of those at least 15 years old, 204 (19.8%) people had a bachelor's or higher degree, 606 (58.7%) had a post-high school certificate or diploma, and 219 (21.2%) people exclusively held high school qualifications. The median income was $53,000, compared with $41,500 nationally. 207 people (20.1%) earned over $100,000 compared to 12.1% nationally. The employment status of those at least 15 was that 585 (56.7%) people were employed full-time, 129 (12.5%) were part-time, and 24 (2.3%) were unemployed.

=== Patumāhoe Rural statistical area ===
Patumāhoe Rural covers 35.00 km^{2} (13.51 sq mi) to the west, north and east of the urban area. It had an estimated population of 1,350 as of June 2025, with a population density of 39 people per km^{2}.

Historical population for Patumāhoe Rural
Year	Pop.	±% p.a.
2013	1,128	—
2018	1,248	+2.04%
2023	1,323	+1.17%

Patumāhoe Rural had a population of 1,323 in the 2023 New Zealand census, an increase of 75 people (6.0%) since the 2018 census, and an increase of 195 people (17.3%) since the 2013 census. There were 657 males, 660 females and 9 people of other genders in 423 dwellings. 2.3% of people identified as LGBTIQ+. The median age was 43.5 years (compared with 38.1 years nationally). There were 252 people (19.0%) aged under 15 years, 204 (15.4%) aged 15 to 29, 645 (48.8%) aged 30 to 64, and 219 (16.6%) aged 65 or older.

People could identify as more than one ethnicity. The results were 83.4% European (Pākehā); 15.2% Māori; 3.6% Pasifika; 11.1% Asian; 0.9% Middle Eastern, Latin American and African New Zealanders (MELAA); and 4.1% other, which includes people giving their ethnicity as "New Zealander". English was spoken by 96.8%, Māori language by 2.3%, Samoan by 0.2%, and other languages by 13.2%. No language could be spoken by 1.4% (e.g. too young to talk). New Zealand Sign Language was known by 0.2%. The percentage of people born overseas was 20.0, compared with 28.8% nationally.

Religious affiliations were 28.8% Christian, 1.6% Hindu, 0.2% Islam, 0.5% Māori religious beliefs, 0.5% Buddhist, 0.7% New Age, 0.2% Jewish, and 2.3% other religions. People who answered that they had no religion were 58.7%, and 6.8% of people did not answer the census question.

Of those at least 15 years old, 240 (22.4%) people had a bachelor's or higher degree, 585 (54.6%) had a post-high school certificate or diploma, and 249 (23.2%) people exclusively held high school qualifications. The median income was $47,900, compared with $41,500 nationally. 186 people (17.4%) earned over $100,000 compared to 12.1% nationally. The employment status of those at least 15 was that 591 (55.2%) people were employed full-time, 171 (16.0%) were part-time, and 15 (1.4%) were unemployed.

== Education ==
Patumahoe School is a contributing state primary school (years 1–6) with a roll of 268 as of July 2026. The school was founded in 1866.

== Notable locations ==
- Wright's Watergardens, 128 Mauku Road, Patumāhoe, a private garden based around Mauku Waterfall and an old quarry, open to the public.
- Patumahoe war memorial domain, 19 Patumahoe Road, sports grounds and a World War II memorial.
