= New Zealand Steel =

Steel mill in Glenbrook, New Zealand

Glenbrook Steel Mill
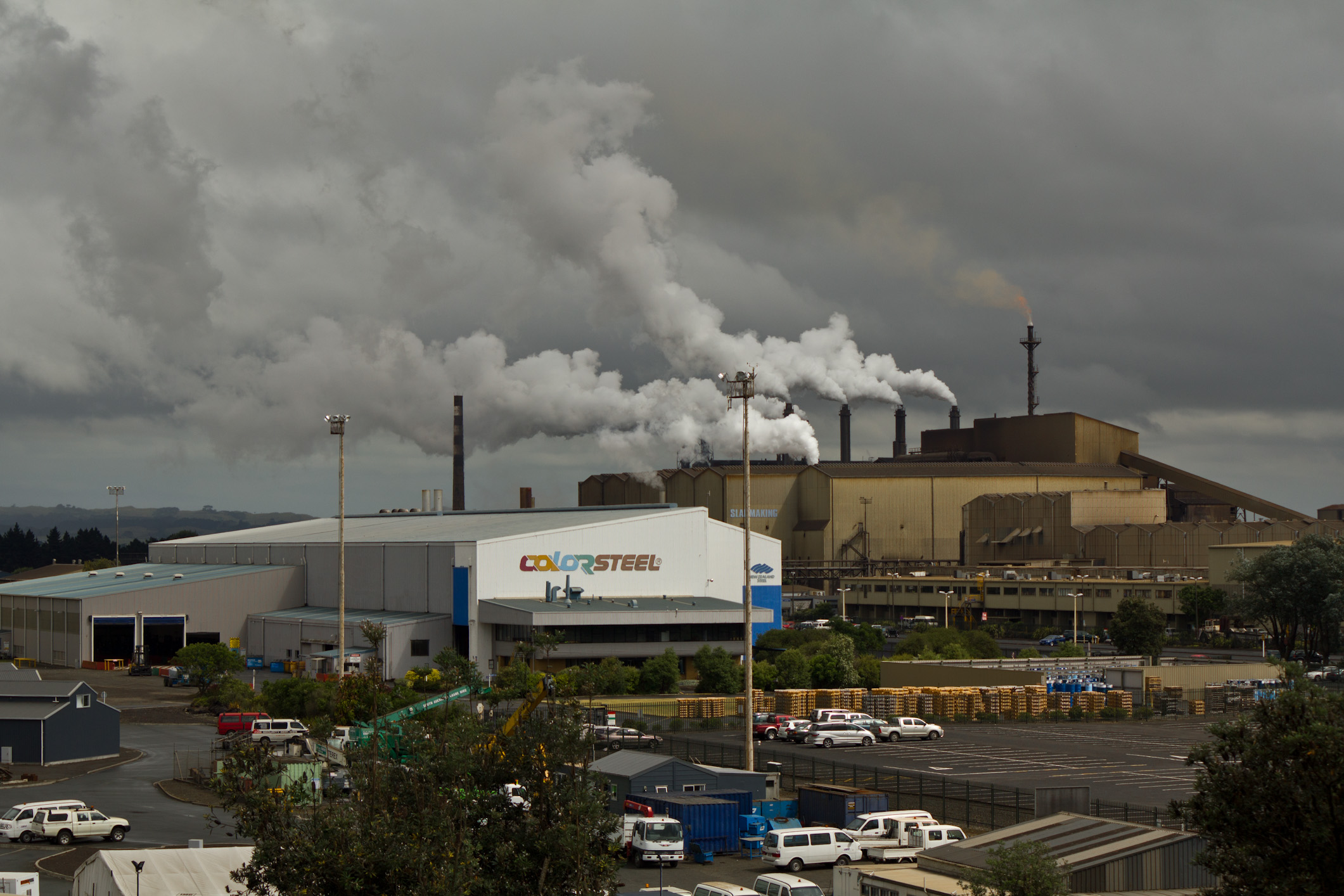
- Glenbrook Steel Mill from the mill's lookout

- Glenbrook Steel Mill location in New Zealand
- Built: 1968
- Location: Auckland, New Zealand
- Coordinates: 37.21°S 174.74°E

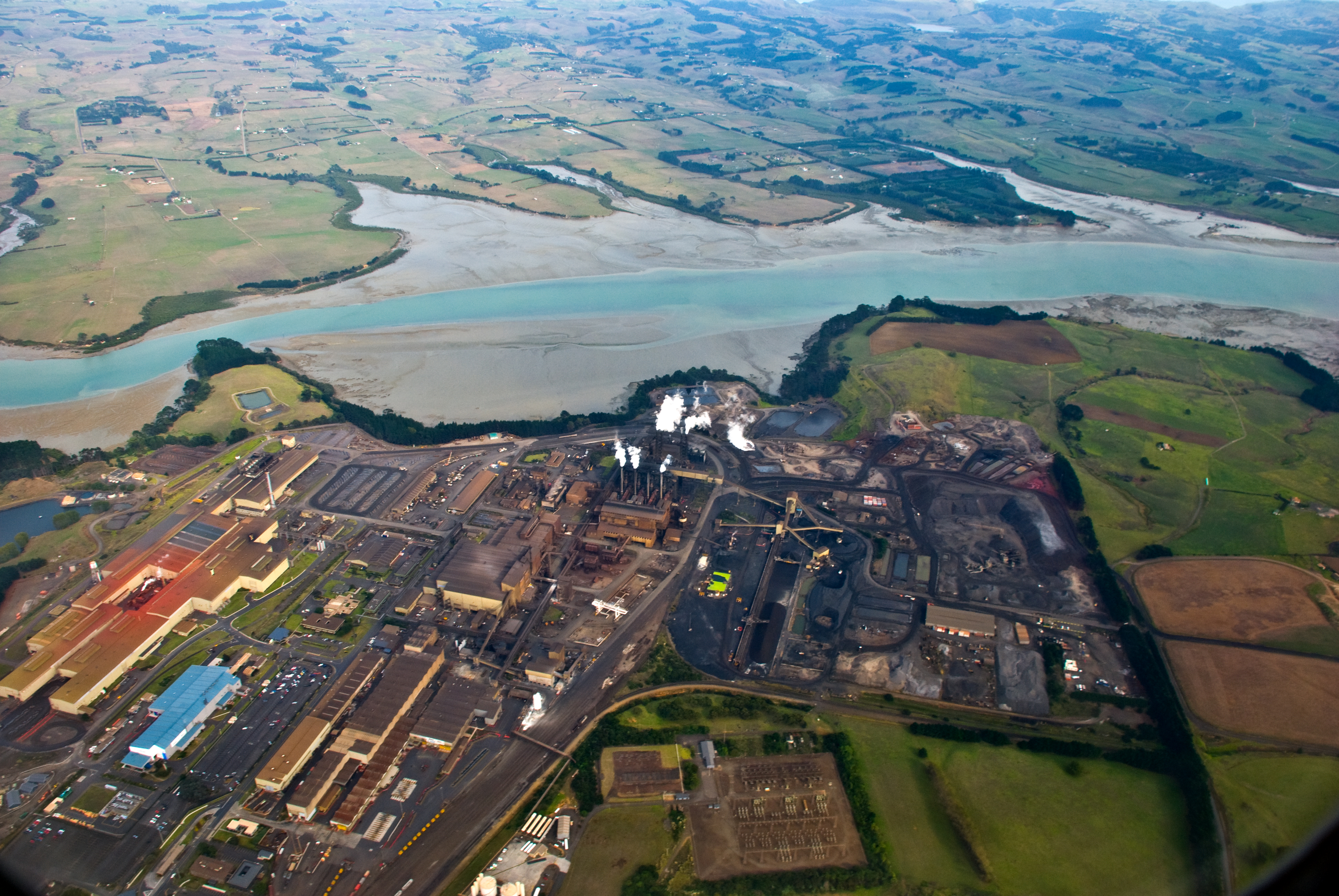
Glenbrook Steel Mill from the air

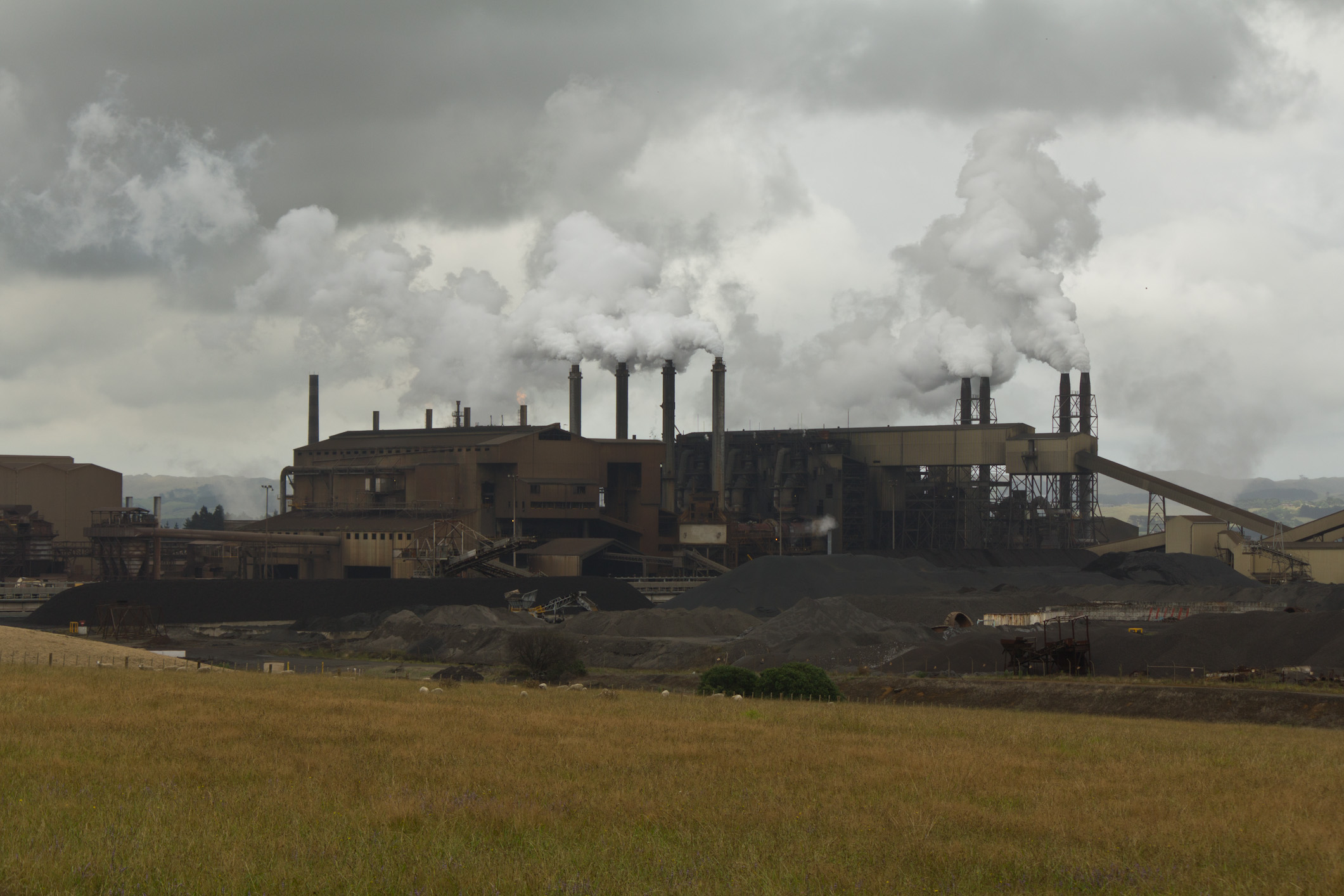
Glenbrook Steel Mill's iron plant

New Zealand Steel Limited is the owner of the Glenbrook Steel Mill, a steel mill located 40 kilometres south of Auckland, in Glenbrook, New Zealand. The mill was constructed in 1968 and began producing steel products in 1969. Currently, the mill produces 650,000 tonnes of steel a year, which is either used domestically or exported. Over 90% of New Zealand's steel requirements are produced at Glenbrook, while the remaining volume is produced by Pacific Steel, a steel recycling facility in Ōtāhuhu, Auckland. The mill is served by the Mission Bush Branch railway line, which was formerly a branch line to Waiuku. Coal and lime trains arrive daily. Steel products are also transported daily. The mill employs 1,150 full-time staff and 200 semi-permanent contractors.

New Zealand Steel is notable due to its unique utilization of ironsand as its ore. Because ironsand is a low grade ore with many contaminants, the mill's primary plants' operations and equipment are unusual.

== History ==
The west coast beaches of the North Island of New Zealand between Kaipara Harbour and Whanganui contain ironsand deposits rich in the mineral titanomagnetite. From the late 19th century to the 1950s, there were many unsuccessful attempts to smelt steel from the ironsands. A prize offered by the Taranaki Provincial Government was never claimed, mostly due to problems encountered by people attempting to process the iron sand, such as a viscous slag of titanium carbides and nitrides that forms and blocks equipment when heat is applied to the sand. In 1954, the Department of Scientific and Industrial Research began investigating smelting from the ironsands. In 1959, The New Zealand Government established the NZ Steel Investigating Company under the Iron and Steel Industry Act 1959 as a vehicle for the investigations.

New Zealand Steel Limited was incorporated by the New Zealand Government in 1965. In 1967, construction started on a mill at Glenbrook. Glenbrook was chosen as the site due to the area's proximity to the Waikato North Head ironsand mine and Huntly Power Station. Commercial operations began in 1968, with imported feed coil being used to produce steel for domestic and Pacific Island markets. The company pioneered the direct reduction process for reducing iron oxide (ironsand) into metallic iron. This culminated in the commissioning in 1970 of iron and steelmaking facilities to produce billets for domestic and export markets. Expansion continued with the commissioning of a pipe plant in 1972 and a prepainting line in 1982. Total output at this time averaged 300,000 tonnes a year.

The steel company ran at a loss during the 1970s, until 1981 when a more optimised, commercially viable method for extracting iron was implemented, leading to an expansion of the Glenbrook facilities.

In the Think Big era of New Zealand industrialisation, the mill was upgraded. In 1987, New Zealand Steel was acquired by Equiticorp. Equiticorp was bankrupted in the New Zealand sharemarket crash of 1987. In 1989 New Zealand Steel was acquired by Helenus Corporation, which consisted of Fisher & Paykel, Steel & Tube, ANZ Bank and BHP. In 1992, BHP took up a controlling interest with an 81% shareholding by acquiring the shares of Fisher & Paykel and Steel & Tube. The company was initially renamed BHP New Zealand Steel Limited, then in 2002 was renamed New Zealand Steel when BHP Steel was listed on the Australian Securities Exchange as BlueScope.

On 21 May 2023, Prime Minister Chris Hipkins announced that the New Zealand Government would provide funding of up to $140 million for an initiative to halve the consumption of coal at the Glenbrook plant and reduce carbon emissions. The project involves installation of an electric arc furnace to replace coal as the heat source for recycling scrap metal.

== The ore ==
The ironsand ore is mined at an opencast mine at Waikato North Head. The ironsand is then mixed to form a slurry and transported to the mill by an 18 kilometre long pipeline. Approximately, 1.2 million tonnes of ironsand ore are delivered to the mill annually. The area is estimated to contain over a billion tonnes.

== The processes ==
Glenbrook's iron plant contains four multiple hearth furnaces, four rotary kilns, and two melters. The kilns directly reduce the ore to metallic iron. This process is unusual as most mills use blast furnaces for the reduction process.

In the steelmaking plant, vanadium recovery and removal is done due to the high vanadium content of the ironsand ore. The sand also contains aluminium, manganese and titanium. Oxidation of the molten metal and contaminants is achieved by a basic oxygen steelmaking facility. The process used in the converter is the second unusual piece of equipment: oxygen is blown on both top and bottom of the converter (Klöckner Oxygen Blown Maxhütte process, or KOBM converter), whereas oxygen is only blasted at the top of the converter in most steelmaking plants.
