= Auckland Region =

Region of New Zealand

Auckland
- Region
- Auckland region within New Zealand
- Coordinates: 36°54′S 174°47′E
- Country: New Zealand
- Island: North Island

Government
  - Type: Unitary authority
  - Body: Auckland Council
  - Mayor: Wayne Brown
  - Deputy Mayor: Desley Simpson

Area
  - Land: 4,941.13 km^{2} (1,907.78 sq mi)

Population (June 2025)
  - Total: 1,816,000
  - Density: 367.5/km^{2} (951.9/sq mi)

GDP
  - Total: NZ$ 136.493 billion (2021) (1st)
  - Per capita: NZ$ 80,328 (2021)
- HDI (2023): 0.967 very high · 2nd
- Website: AucklandCouncil.govt.nz

Auckland (Māori: Tāmaki Makaurau) is one of the 16 regions of New Zealand, which takes its name from the eponymous urban area. The region encompasses the Auckland metropolitan area, smaller towns, rural areas, and the islands of the Hauraki Gulf. Containing 34 percent of the nation's residents, it has by far the largest population and economy of any region of New Zealand, but the second-smallest land area.

On 1 November 2010, the Auckland region became a unitary authority administered by the Auckland Council, replacing the previous regional council and seven local councils. In the process, an area in its southeastern corner was transferred to the neighbouring Waikato region. Since then, the Auckland Council has introduced a system of local boards to divide the region for local government.

== Geography ==
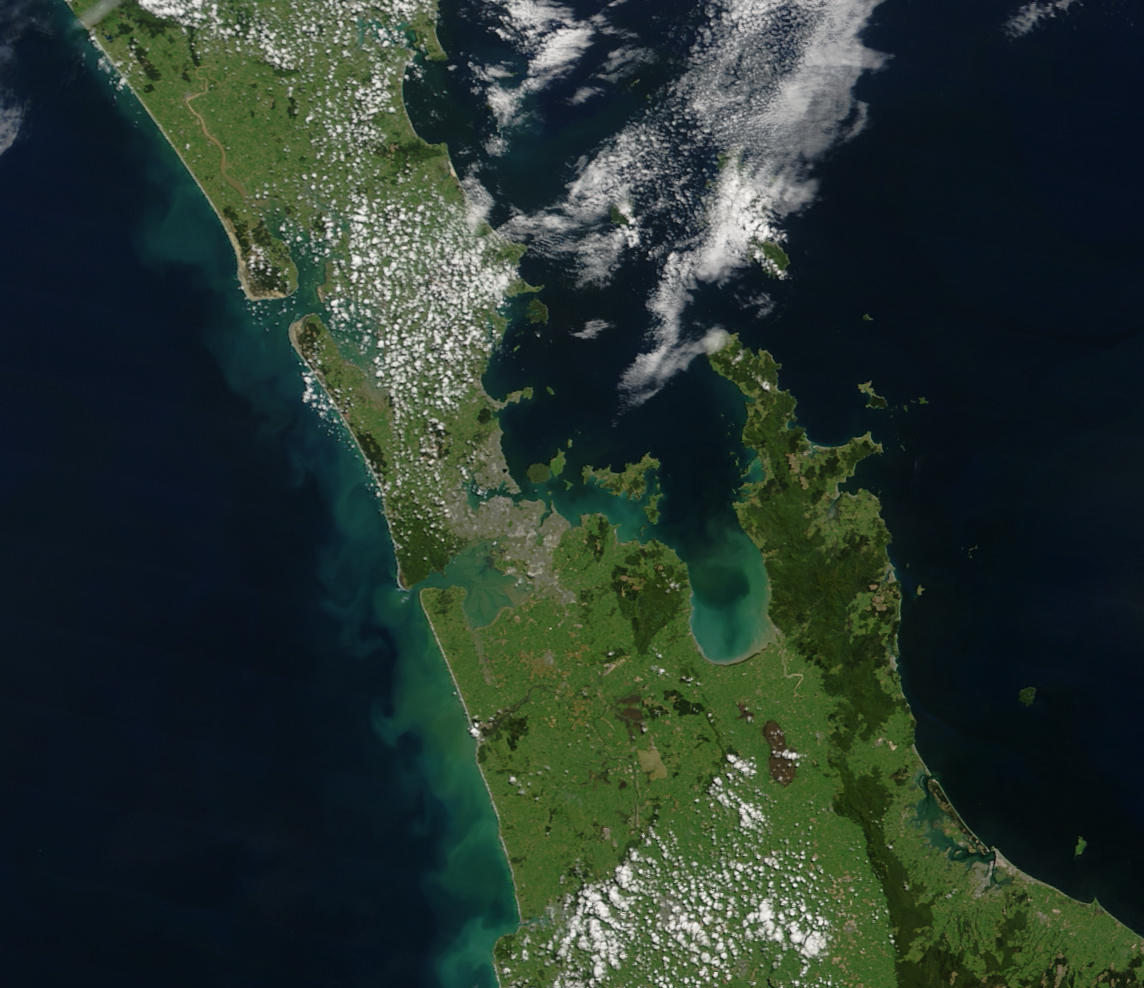
True-colour image of the region showing the Auckland urban area as the brownish area just left of centre, with the Hauraki Gulf to the right

On the mainland, the region extends from the mouth of the Kaipara Harbour in the north across the southern stretches of the Northland Peninsula, through the Waitākere Ranges and the Auckland isthmus and across the low-lying land surrounding the Manukau Harbour, ending within a few kilometres of the mouth of the Waikato River. It also includes the islands of the Hauraki Gulf. It is bordered in the north by the Northland region, and in the south by the Waikato region. The Hunua Ranges and the adjacent coastline along the Firth of Thames were part of the region until the Auckland Council was formed in late 2010, when they were transferred to the Waikato region. In land area the region is smaller than all the other regions and unitary authorities except Nelson.

The region's coastline is 3,702 kilometres (2,300 mi) long. It has about 21,000 kilometres (13,000 mi) of rivers and streams, about 8 percent of these in urban areas. Its highest point is the summit of Little Barrier Island, at 722 metres.

Historically the term 'Auckland region' referred to the area of the former Auckland Province and it was not until the 1950s that the term 'Auckland region' came to encompass an area equivalent to the current legal boundaries.

=== Past administrative divisions ===
Prior to the merger into the Auckland Council on 1 November 2010, the Auckland region consisted of seven territorial local authorities (TLAs); four cities and three districts:

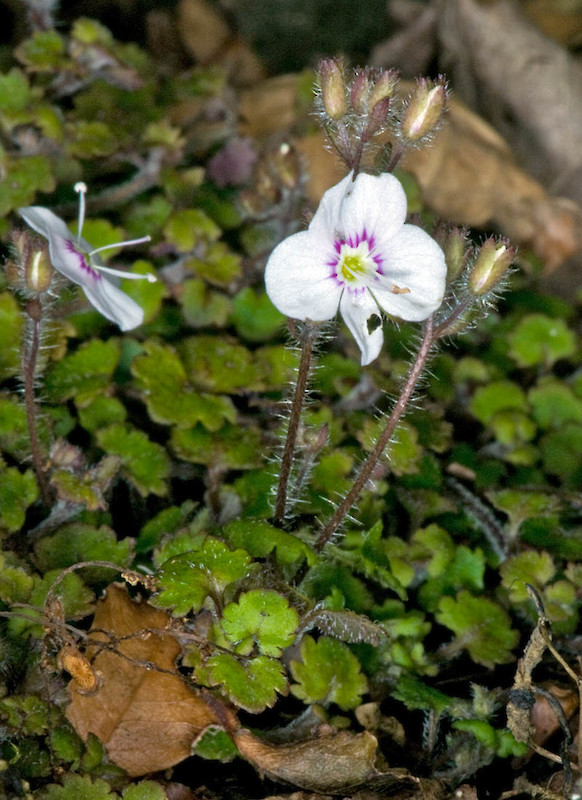
Riverhead speedwell (Veronica jovellanoides), a very rare plant endemic to the region

- Auckland City
- Manukau City
- North Shore City
- Waitakere City
- Franklin District
- Papakura District
- Rodney District

=== Biodiversity ===
The Auckland region is home to at least 23 known species or subspecies exclusively found in the region. This includes plant species such as the Waitākere rock koromiko, the undescribed Mokohinau gecko, insect species such as the Little Barrier giant wētā, and bird species known to roost exclusively in the Auckland region, such as the New Zealand storm petrel. Many endemic species are found exclusively within the Waitākere Ranges, on Great Barrier Island, Little Barrier Island and the Mokohinau Islands.

== Demographics ==
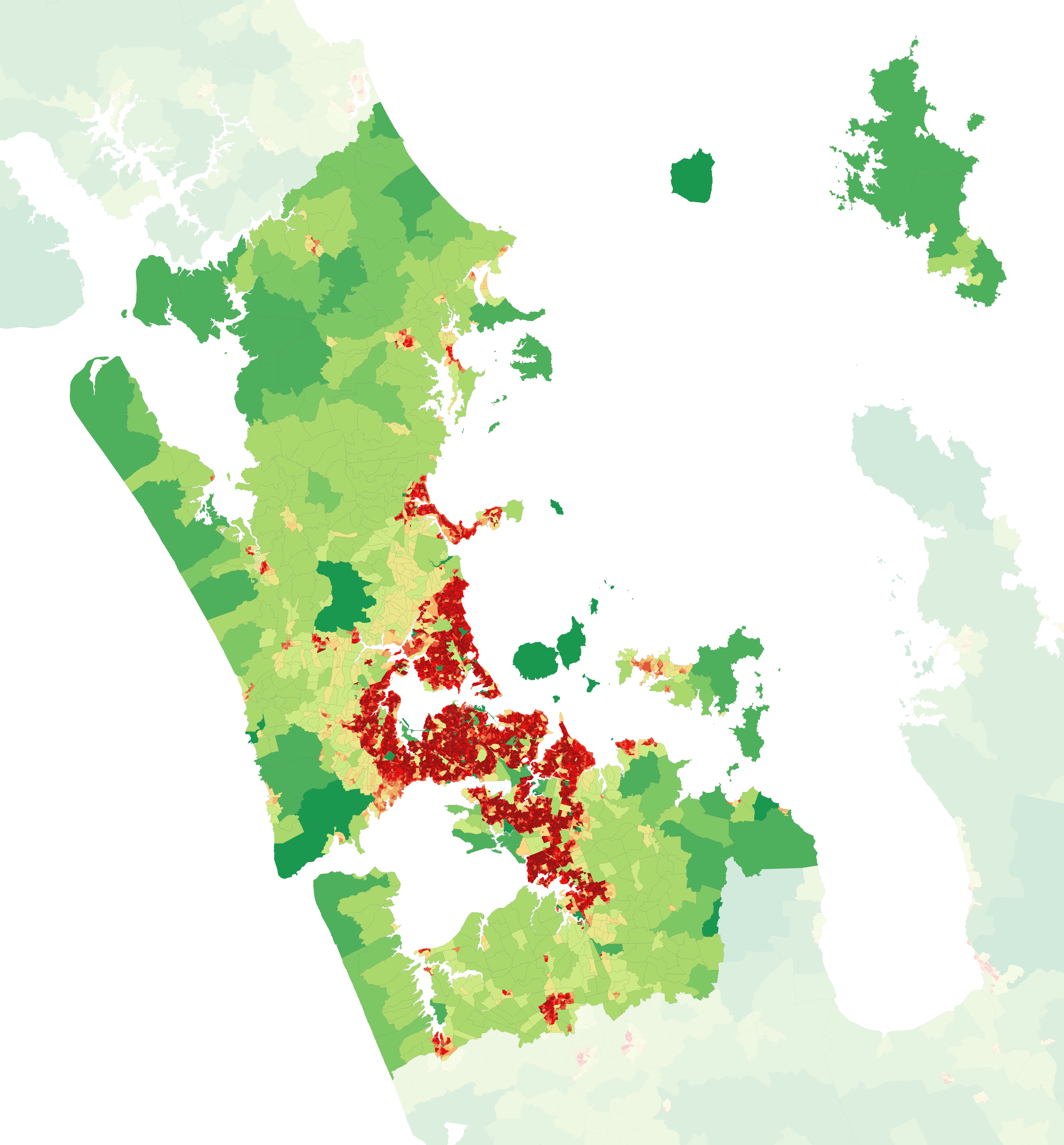
Population density map for Auckland in the 2023 census

The Auckland region covers 4,941.16 km^{2} (1,907.79 sq mi) and had an estimated population of 1,816,000 as of June 2025, with a population density of 368 people per km^{2}.

Historical population
Year	Pop.	±% p.a.
1991	943,773	—
1996	1,068,660	+2.52%
2001	1,158,891	+1.63%
2006	1,304,958	+2.40%
2013	1,415,550	+1.17%
2018	1,571,718	+2.12%
2023	1,656,486	+1.06%

The Auckland region had a population of 1,656,486 in the 2023 New Zealand census, an increase of 84,768 people (5.4%) since the 2018 census, and an increase of 240,936 people (17.0%) since the 2013 census. There were 818,262 males, 832,188 females and 6,036 people of other genders in 544,083 dwellings. 3.5% of people identified as LGBTIQ+. The median age was 35.9 years (compared with 38.1 years nationally). There were 318,843 people (19.2%) aged under 15 years, 346,938 (20.9%) aged 15 to 29, 770,949 (46.5%) aged 30 to 64, and 219,750 (13.3%) aged 65 or older.

People could identify as more than one ethnicity. The results were 49.8% European (Pākehā); 12.3% Māori; 16.6% Pasifika; 31.3% Asian; 2.7% Middle Eastern, Latin American and African New Zealanders (MELAA); and 1.8% other, which includes people giving their ethnicity as "New Zealander". English was spoken by 92.3%, Māori language by 2.6%, Samoan by 4.5% and other languages by 29.4%. No language could be spoken by 2.3% (e.g. too young to talk). New Zealand Sign Language was known by 0.4%. The percentage of people born overseas was 42.5, compared with 28.8% nationally.

Religious affiliations were 34.9% Christian, 5.4% Hindu, 2.9% Islam, 0.9% Māori religious beliefs, 1.9% Buddhist, 0.3% New Age, 0.2% Jewish, and 2.6% other religions. People who answered that they had no religion were 44.8%, and 6.2% of people did not answer the census question.

Of those at least 15 years old, 330,039 (24.7%) people had a bachelor's or higher degree, 571,350 (42.7%) had a post-high school certificate or diploma, and 345,828 (25.9%) people exclusively held high school qualifications. The median income was $44,700, compared with $41,500 nationally. 194,880 people (14.6%) earned over $100,000 compared to 12.1% nationally. The employment status of those at least 15 was that 712,110 (53.2%) people were employed full-time, 161,946 (12.1%) were part-time, and 43,947 (3.3%) were unemployed.

=== Towns and cities ===
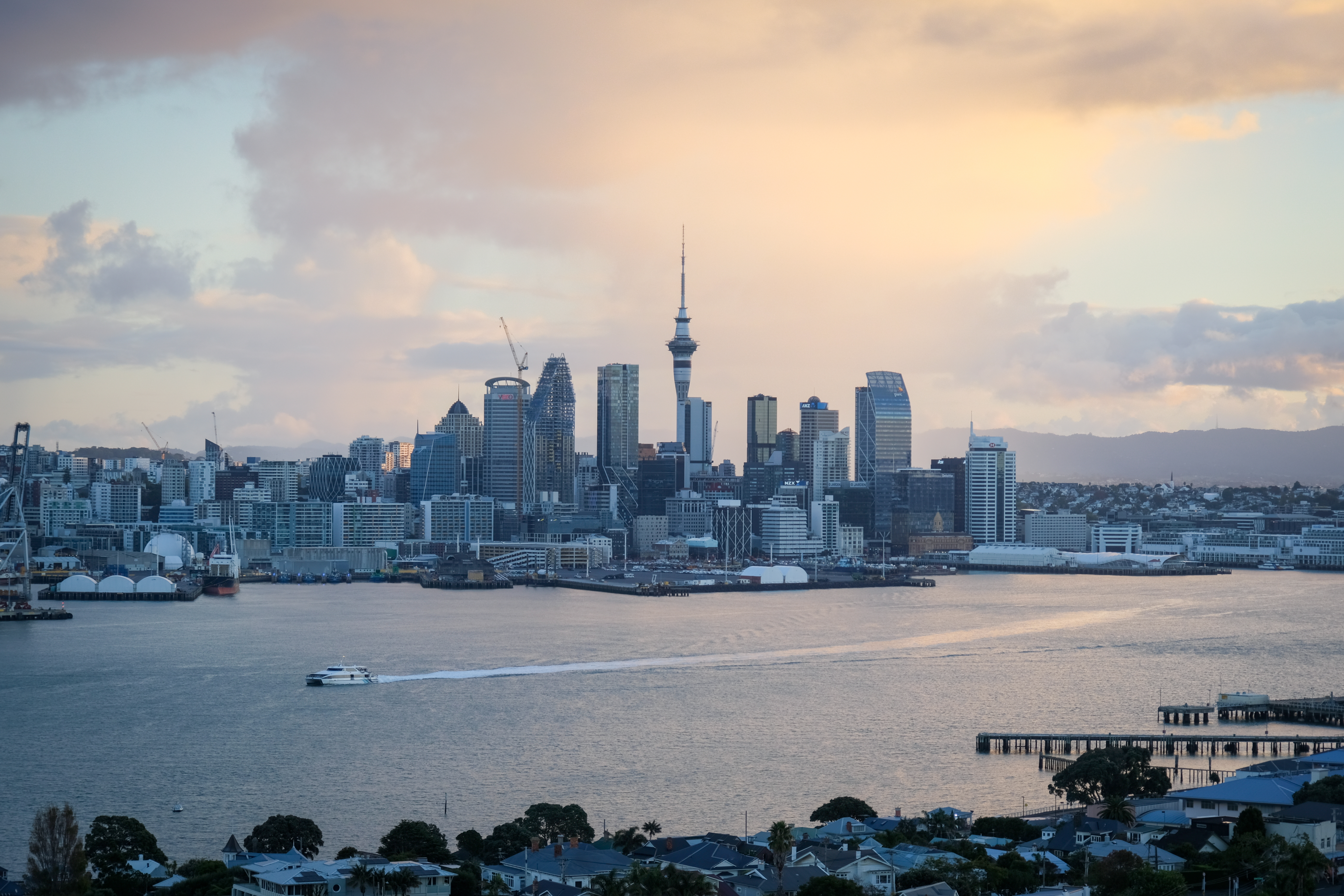
Auckland

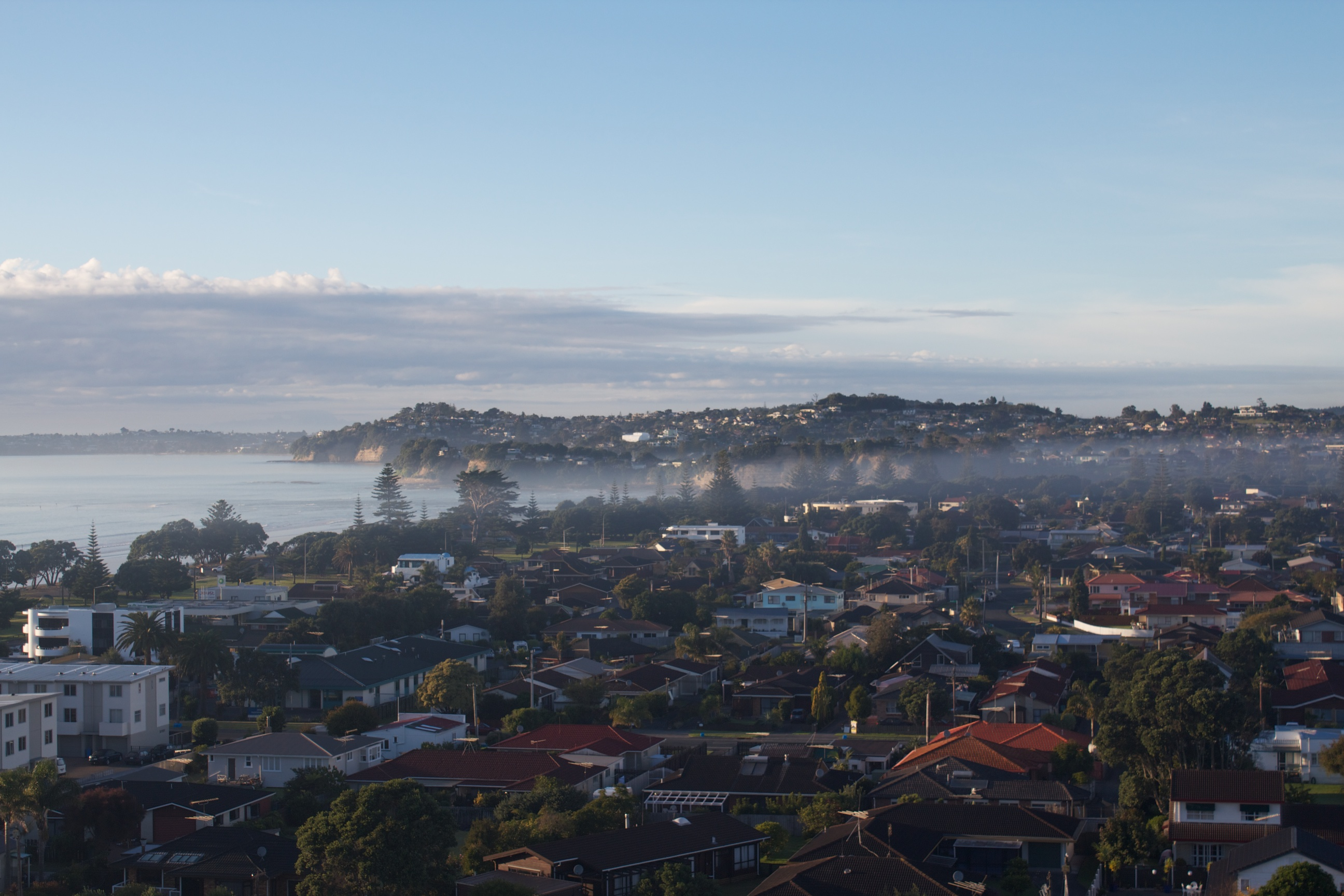
Hibiscus Coast

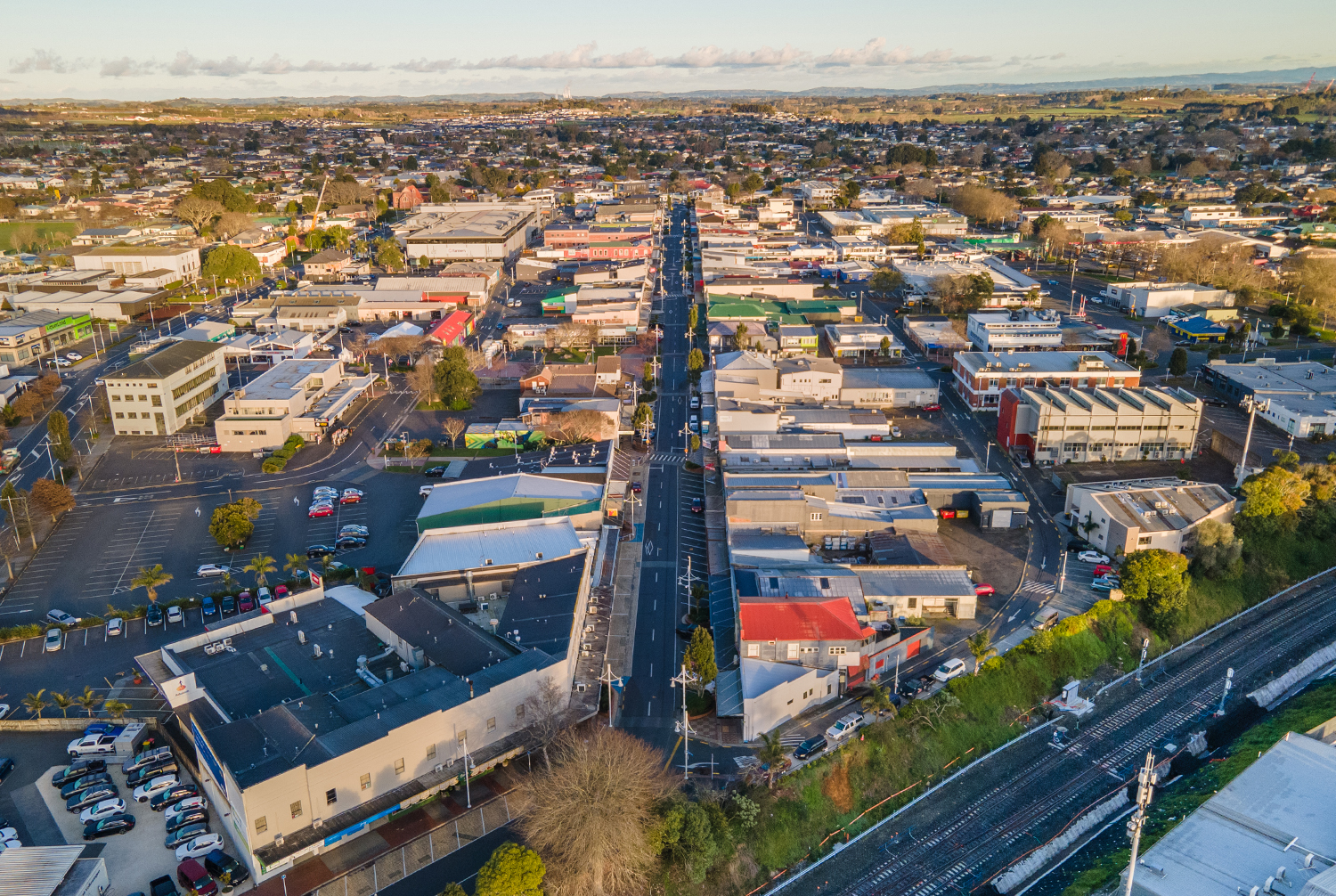
Pukekohe

The eponymous city (urban area) of Auckland has a population of 1,547,200 as of June 2025, making up 85.2% of the region's population.

Other urban areas in the Auckland region include:

- Hibiscus Coast (67,800)
- Pukekohe (28,800)
- Waiuku (9,860)
- Waiheke West (8,160)
- Beachlands-Pine Harbour (8,330)
- Kumeū-Huapai (8,270)
- Warkworth (7,080)
- Snells Beach (3,750)
- Riverhead (3,840)
- Helensville (3,540)
- Maraetai (2,660)
- Wellsford (2,110)
- Clarks Beach (1,660)
- Muriwai (1,110)
- Patumahoe (1,460)
- Waimauku (1,400)
- Parakai (1,090)

== See also ==
- Auckland § Scope
