= Manukau Heads Lighthouse =

Lighthouse in New Zealand

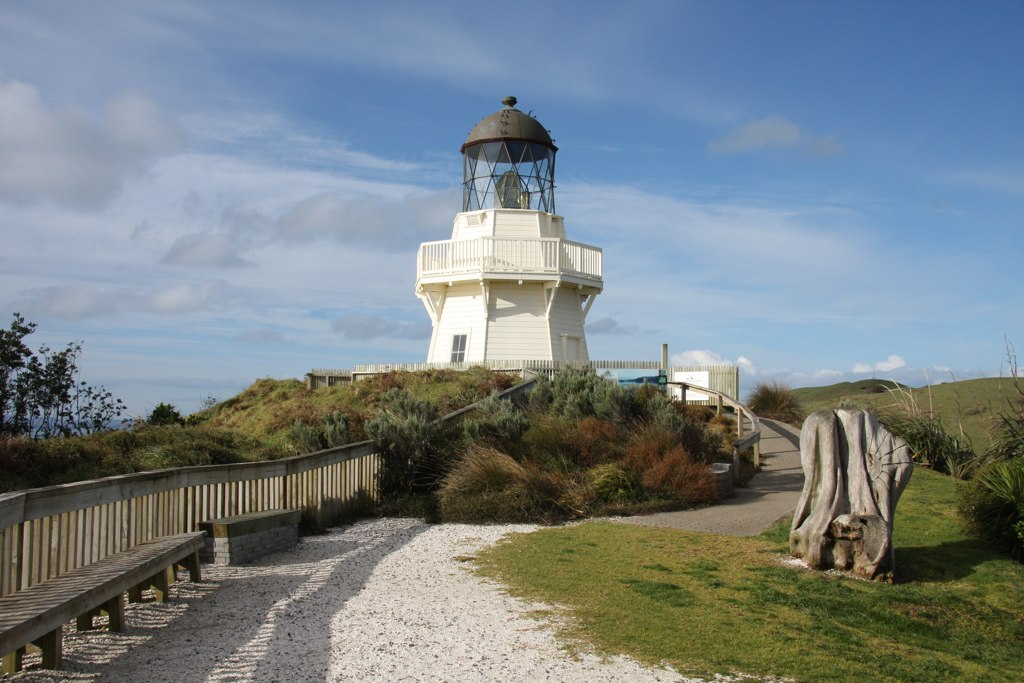
- Location: Manukau Harbour; Auckland; New Zealand
- Coordinates: 37°03′02″S 174°32′45″E

Tower
- Constructed: 1874
- Construction: timber

Light
- First lit: 1874

Manukau Heads Lighthouse is a lighthouse situated on the Āwhitu Peninsula, at the Manukau Heads, the entrance to the Manukau Harbour in Auckland, New Zealand.

== History ==
The lighthouse is close to the location of the HMS Orpheus disaster in February 1863. Around the year 1870, the signal station located on Paratutae Island was moved south, close to the location of the lighthouse.

The Manukau Heads Lighthouse was constructed in 1874. Its wooden design was influential, and replicated across New Zealand. It was also the first lighthouse to burn kerosene in New Zealand.

In the early 21st century, the lighthouse was refurbished to the original design. In February 2023, the lighthouse became inaccessible due to landslips caused by Cyclone Gabrielle.

== See also ==
- List of lighthouses in New Zealand
