= Whatipu Lodge =

Historic accommodation site at Whatipu, West Auckland, New Zealand

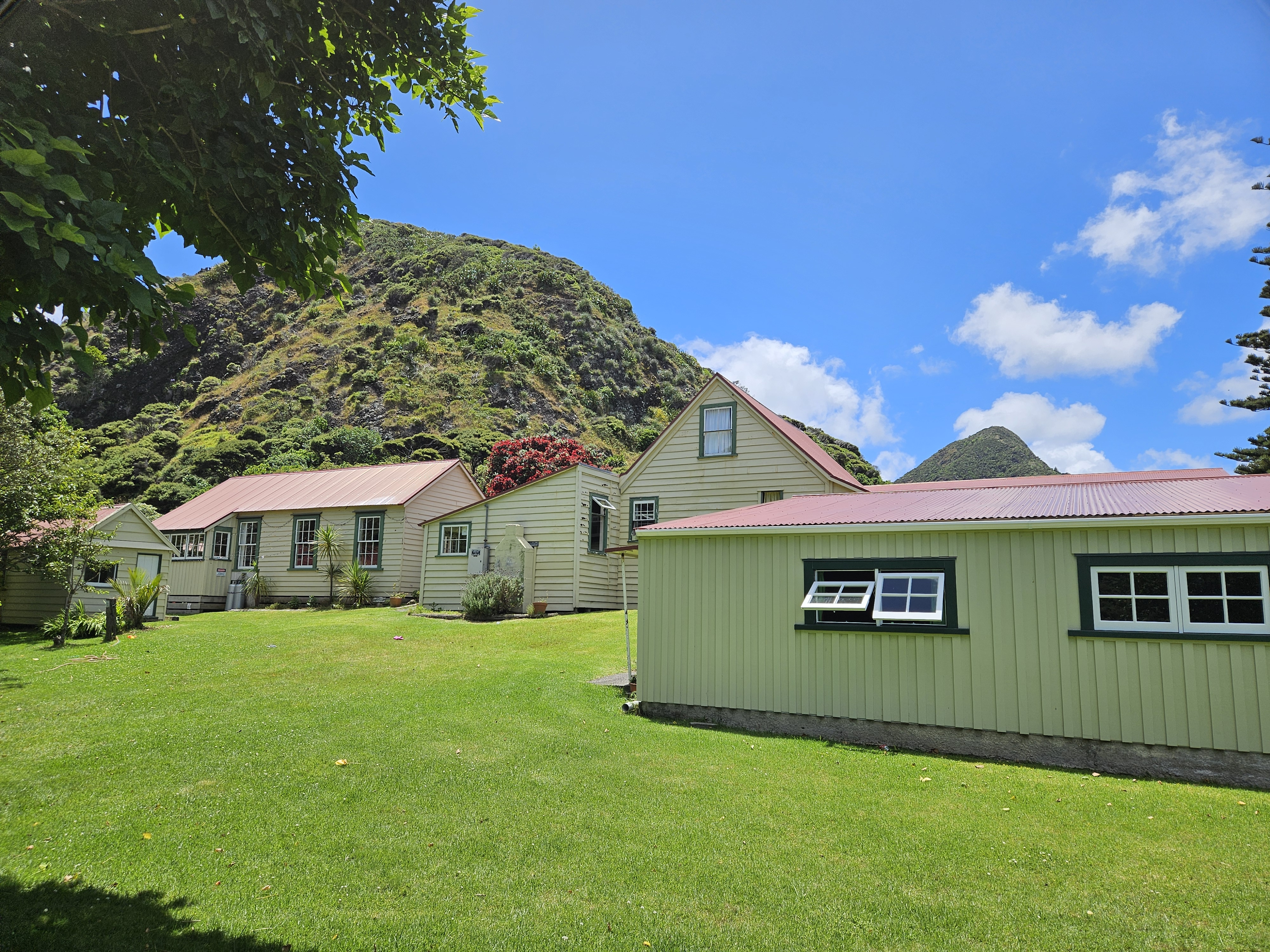
- Whatipu Lodge
- Interactive map of the Whatipu Lodge area
- Former names: Gibbons Homestead

General information
- Status: Still operating as lodge
- Architectural style: Vernacular
- Location: Whatipu, Whatipu Road, Huia, Auckland
- Coordinates: 37°02′18″S 174°30′27″E
- Named for: Nicholas Gibbons (original name)
- Year built: 1870 (original homestead)

Website
- https://whatipulodge.co.nz

Whatipu Lodge is a historic lodge located in Whatipu, a historic remote settlement to the west of Auckland. The lodge was originally a 19th-century homestead alongside a timber mill before being converted to accommodation.

== Description ==
The lodge is constructed from local kauri timber. The buildings making up the lodge include the Gibbons Homestead, cabins, a kitchen and dining hall, a former post office, and a dairy shed.

Gibbons Homestead is a one and half a storey home with a steep gable roof. There are two bedrooms in the attic. The first floor has four rooms with a central hall. The roof is corrugated iron but was originally cladded using shingles.

The dining room is a single storey building with a lean-to and a gabled roof. Inside the lean-to is a shop, office, and verandah.

The cabin blocks are rectangular with gabled rooves with entrances off the verandah.

The post office is a small shed with a gabled roof. The dairy is similar, although it is a square shed.

== History ==
=== Timber mill ===
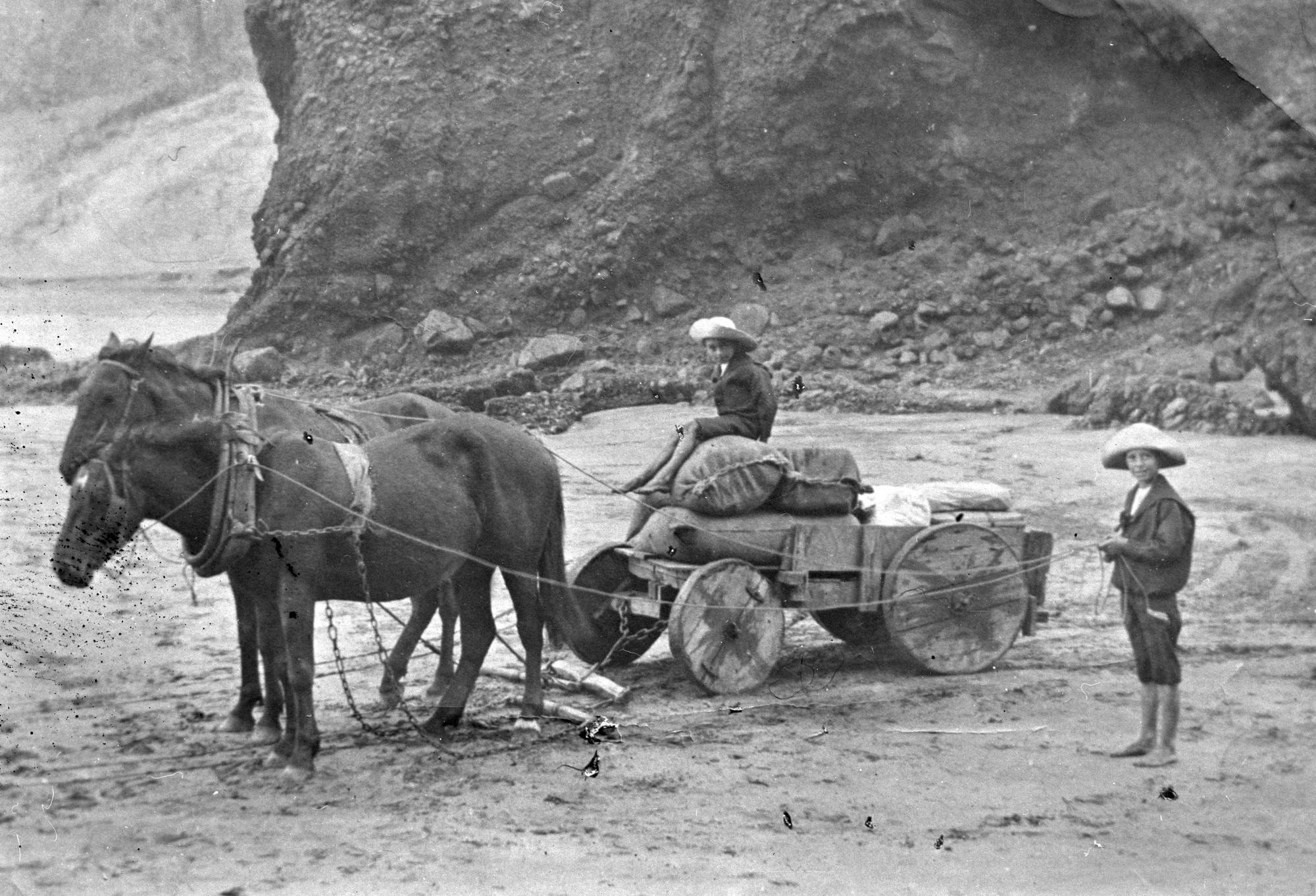
Gibbons family on the beach outside Whatipu

In 1867 a mill was constructed in Whatipu by Nicholas Gibbons, an early settler from Newfoundland. (Note: One source states Gibbons came from Nova Scotia but three other sources state he came from Newfoundland) Timber was taken from Whatipu via boat to Onehunga. In the 1870s the area surrounding the mill had grown to close to a hundred people. In 1876 the mill, alongside another in the Pararaha Gorge was leased to Waller and Garlick. In August 1877 the two men had given up and the mill was placed on the market. In November 1878 both mills and the bush—which covered 3,000 acres—was purchased by Guthrie and Lanark for £24,000. The mills would be run until 1881 when a fire would destroy the mill at Pararaha. The milling was moved to Karekare and the Whatipu mill was closed.

=== Gibbons family ===
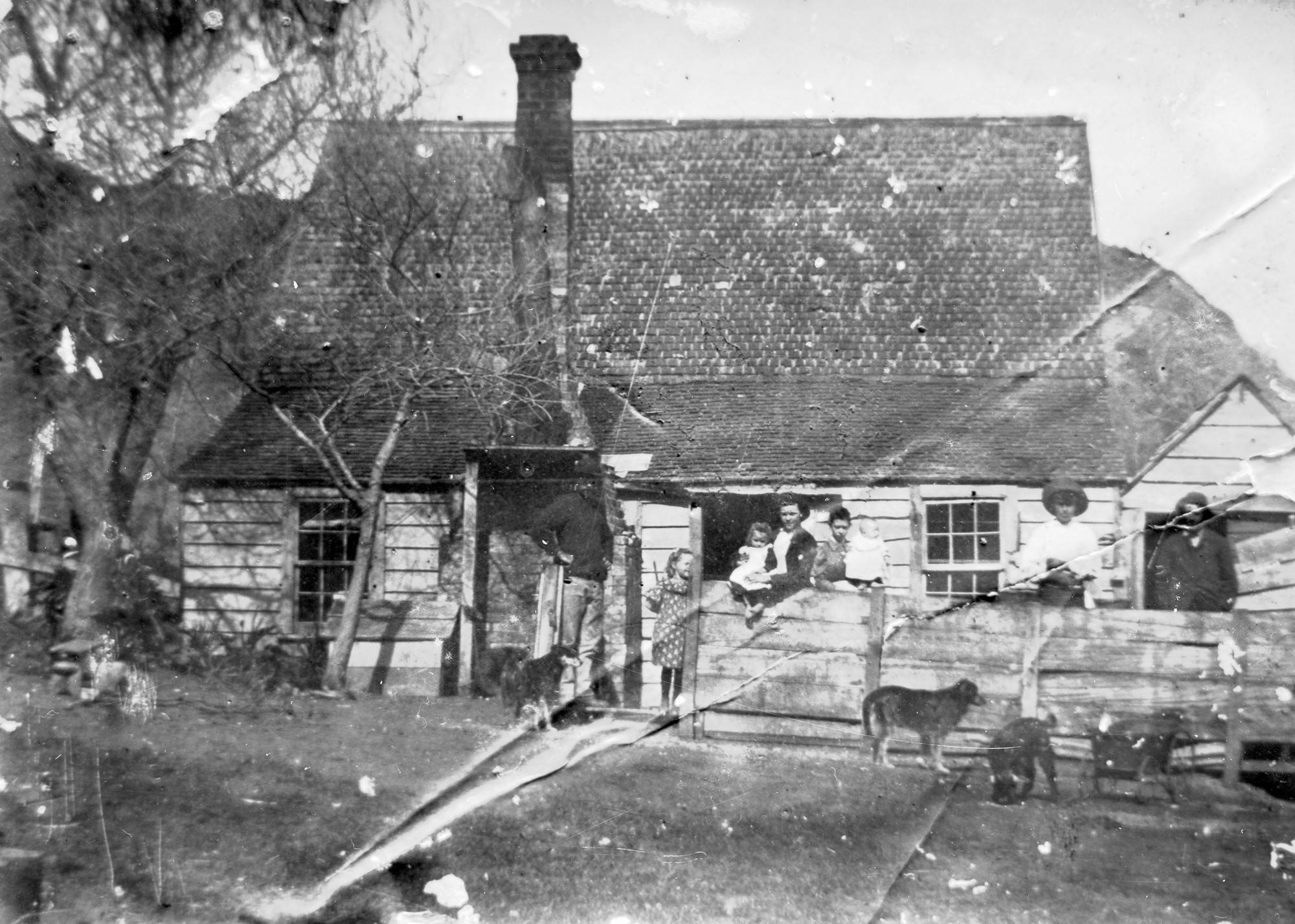
Gibbons family and their homestead, before 1900

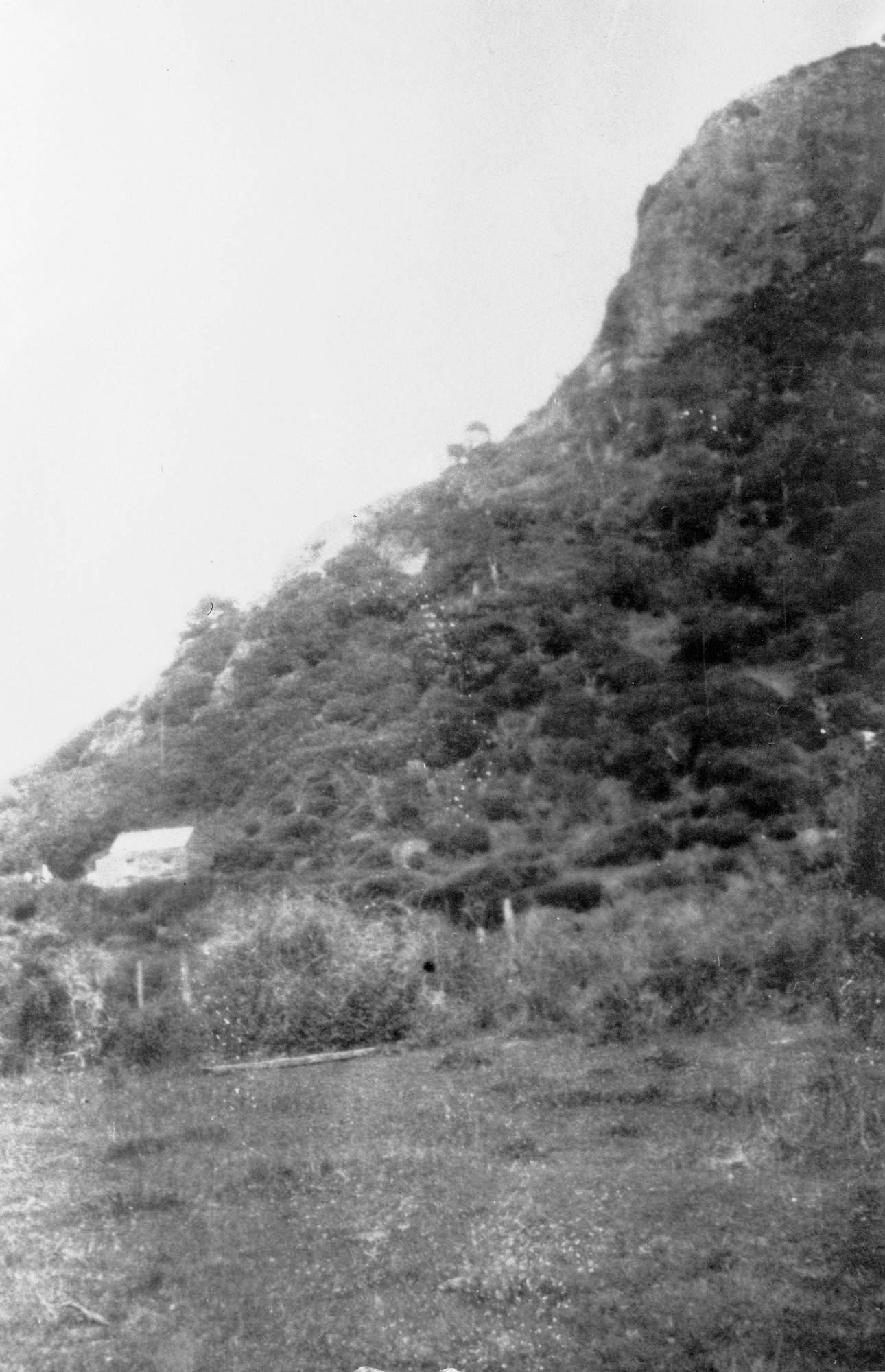
Gibbons homestead in Whatipu

In 1870 Gibbons constructed (Note: One source gives the constructor as an Ebenzer Gibbons) a homestead that later became the lodge. Gibbons and his family lived at the homestead even after the mill was sold. Nicholas and his wife retired and move to Weymouth in the 1890s. One of Nicholas' sons, Fred Gibbons continued to live at the property alongside his wife. Due to the lack of a road connecting Whatipu to Auckland and the only boat contact being fortnightly they largely survived off what they grew and took from the ocean. In the early 1900s all eight of Fred's children contracted diphtheria. He had to row a dinghy to nearby Cornwallis for the children to be transported to Auckland. It took over 14 hours to reach the hospital and two of his children died.

=== Lodge ===
Since the 1890s the Gibbons homestead had served as accommodation for travellers following the construction of extra buildings around the homestead. Following the recreation of a tramway along the west Auckland coast in 1910 the number of travellers to Whatipu had increased. Later that same year Fred built a new homestead behind the original, which was serving as accommodation for paying guests.

During the 1910s he built a dining hall and kitchen along with bunk houses. These buildings housed tourists and single men. Married men working on the tramway and at timber mills in Paratutai would live down in the valley in old mill cottages.

The complex of houses surrounding the old homestead gained the name Whatipu Lodge.

Following the First World War the Whatipu Lodge became quite a busy place as the nearby caves had been used as a ballroom for dances since 1899. The ferry from Onehunga would take them to the caves and they would sleep at the lodge before returning for Auckland the next day.

In 1915 a whale washed up on the shore. The blubber from the whale was combined with red ochre to coat the buildings.

In 1921 the timber milling industry closed down the mill cottages were no longer being rented out. The only income for the Gibbons family were from holiday makers at the lodge. Thankfully for Gibbons the post-war boom resulted in the lodge being a very busy place. People came from all over the Auckland region to partake in the dances in the Whatipu cave, fishing, and pig hunting. Bob Harvey described this period during the 1920s as a 'time of gaiety and young people's frolic'. This led to the Gibbons setting up the Whatipu Lodge as a proper holiday accommodation.

In 1929 Gibbons and his wife sold the property and retired to Weymouth, like his parents before him. The lodge was purchased by John and Winnie Douglas.

The Douglases had decided to leave the City of Auckland for a more sylvan life at Whatipu with their children. During that time they installed a septic tank and moved the former post office from Paratutai to the lodge grounds. During their ownership of the property they also farmed sheep and cattle.

In 1932 the Douglas family sold the lodge to Wally and Florence Farley. The Farleys had run a guesthouse at Karekare since 1900. During their time as owners of the lodge they advertised it as Whatipu House and built a tennis court. As the Great Depression ended the lodge became a popular spot for holiday making once again.

In 1947 the Farleys retired and they sold the property to Austin Gibson. He built new accommodation for the manager and installed a billiard table. Gibson wanted to create a high end service complete with catering staff; however, his changes proved unpopular with holiday makers and he was unable to cover his costs and the lodge became neglected. In 1949 the laundry and two bathrooms were destroyed in a fire. Guests of the lodge attempted to put out the blaze but could not control it until a group of almost two dozen came from Swanson for unrelated reasons and helped put out the fire. The historic homestead was not damaged by this. Under Gibson the lodge became desuetude.

Phil Sharp took up management of the lodge in 1950. Phil was a returned soldier who was injured in the North African campaign. Phil had visited the lodge in the 1940s and wanted to restore it. When he had purchased it fowl had been nesting inside the buildings. Phil would restore the lodge by repairing buildings, removing gorse, upgrading the water supply, and installed a stove from an old Huia property. Phil also grazed cattle in the greater Whatipu area. During Phil's tenure the amount of land was reduced following interest by the Auckland Regional Authority in managing the wider area as a park. The council upgraded the road to Whatipu after Phil had cleared out overgrown gorse manually. Phil had to manually install the telephone poles and wiring himself with funding provided by the local government.

In 1971 the Auckland Harbour Board leased 1,100 acres of land at Whatipu to the Auckland Reginal Authority for the Auckland Centennial Memorial Park. The cottages were leased for another 10 years following this but that lease was not renewed. At one point Sharp had suggested all buildings in the area besides the Gibbons Homestead be demolished and a motel be built. This never occurred.

In 1984 the lodge was purchased and ran by Neal and Mary Roberts. During their first year the old mill cottages that were leased from the Auckland Regional Authority were removed bar the Liebergreen Cottage. They renovated the buildings and upgraded the facilities. During the renovations the buildings were painted in dark colours. The lodge saw a new boom in popularity following appearances in Shortland Street and in two different movies starring Cybill Shepherd and Ian Mune respectively. The Roberts continued to manage the lodge until 2000. Marnie Hunter and Alison Anderson took over in 2001. As of 2010 they were still managing the lodge.

In 2002 Whatipu was declared a scientific reserve by the Crown with the Auckland Regional Council having authority. The council decided on keeping both the lodge and Liebergreen Cottage and the lodge continued operation under new management.

As of 2024 the lodge is still operating as accommodation.

== Liebergreen cottage ==
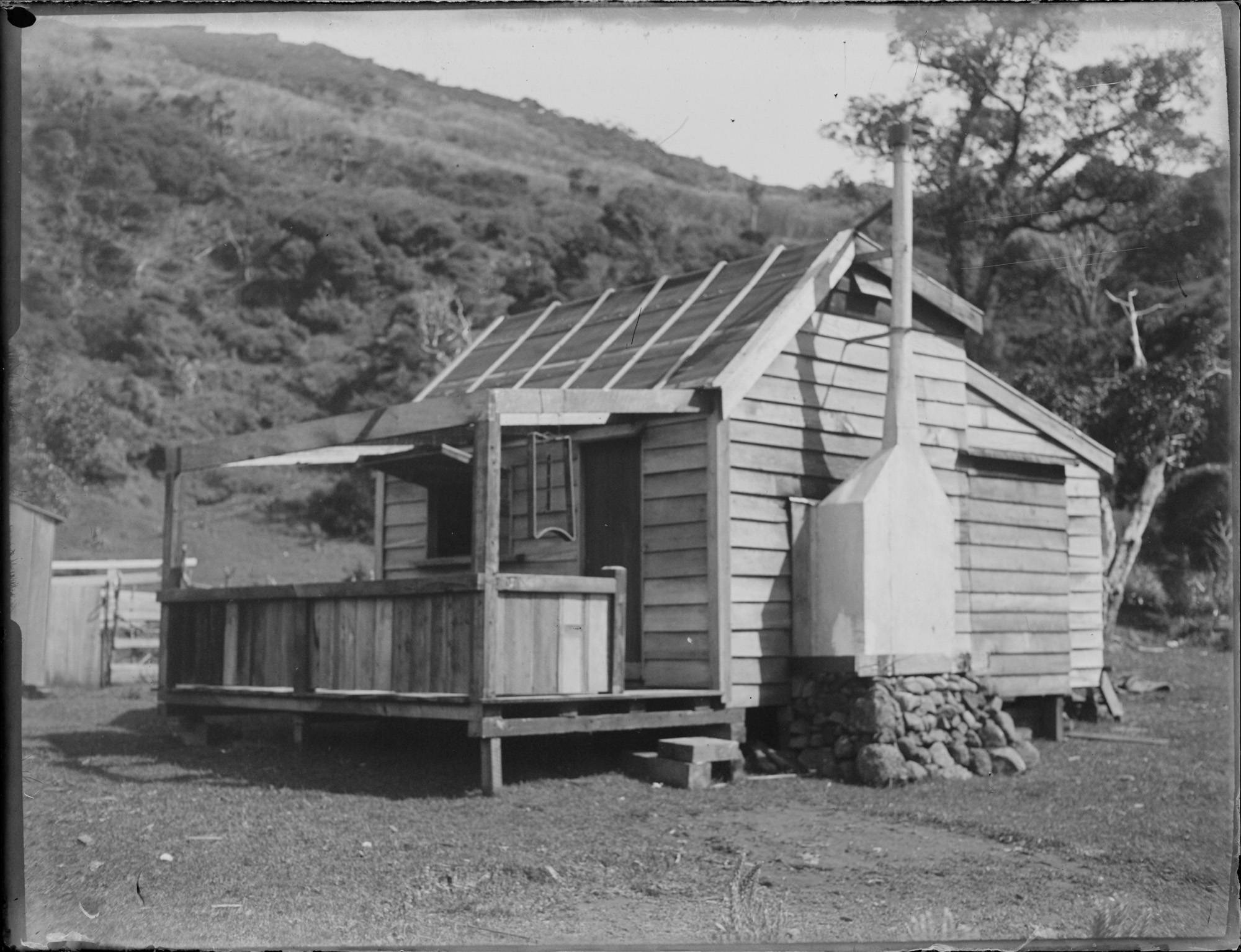
Liebergreen cottage in the 1920s.

Fred Gibbons sold two of the old mill worker cottages to Bert and Anne Jones in c.1922. The cottages were moved by horse west of the lodge and joined to form a bach. One back wall was dismantled to make way for this and its boards were used to construct a verandah. The kauri chimneys were also demolished for the verandah. Jones built an iron chimney with a fireplace constructed from local stones. In the 1930s the verandah was enclosed with a new window, allegedly from the wreck of HMS Orpheus. The cottage made up a group of 4 cottages. Electricity was installed in the 1950s. A Briggs & Stratton engine with a Chrysler dynamo were used to power the building.

The Joneses kept the property until 1964 when it was sold to either Yvette or Christian Liebergreen. (Note: Auckland Regional Council reports the purchaser as Yvette Liebergreen but Dave Pearson Architects reports it as Christian Liebergreen. Dave Pearson Architects states that Christian and Yvette were husband and wife respectively.) The Auckland Regional Authority took ownership of the property in 1984 and it has been used as accommodation for park rangers and contractors. An early draft plan for the Auckland Centennial Park involved the removal of the cottages. The Waitemata City Council lobbied for the protection of the cottage with a statement from Liebergreen about the historicity of the cottage.

The Roberts took over the cottages' leases in 1984. In 1984, during the ownership of the Roberts, the three other cottages were demolished. In 1984 the ARA took control of Liebergreen Cottage. Shortly after they repaired the cottage, demolished the sleep out, and constructed an outhouse. Following these works the cottage was used by rangers, employees, contractors, and researchers.

In 2003 the regional council carried out a heritage evaluation survey on the cottage.

Liebergreen Cottage has a saltbox roof, built-in furniture, a step where the two huts were merged, and a fireplace. On the outside is an enclosed porch with Union Jack style balustrades. The boards of the cottage are all constructed from kauri.
