= Manukau Heads =

Geological landmarks in New Zealand

Coordinates: 37.0486695°S 174.5247746°E

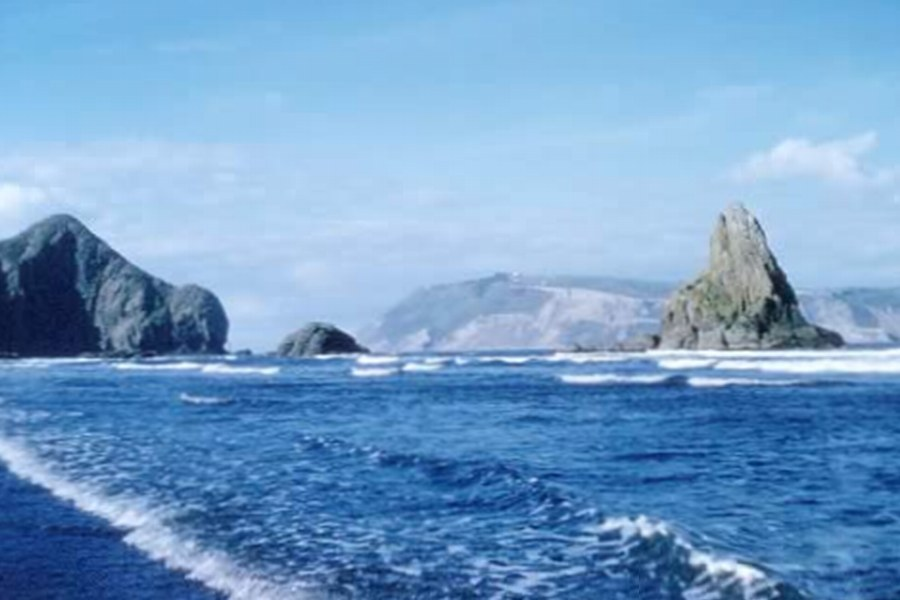
The Manukau Harbour Heads in 1960.

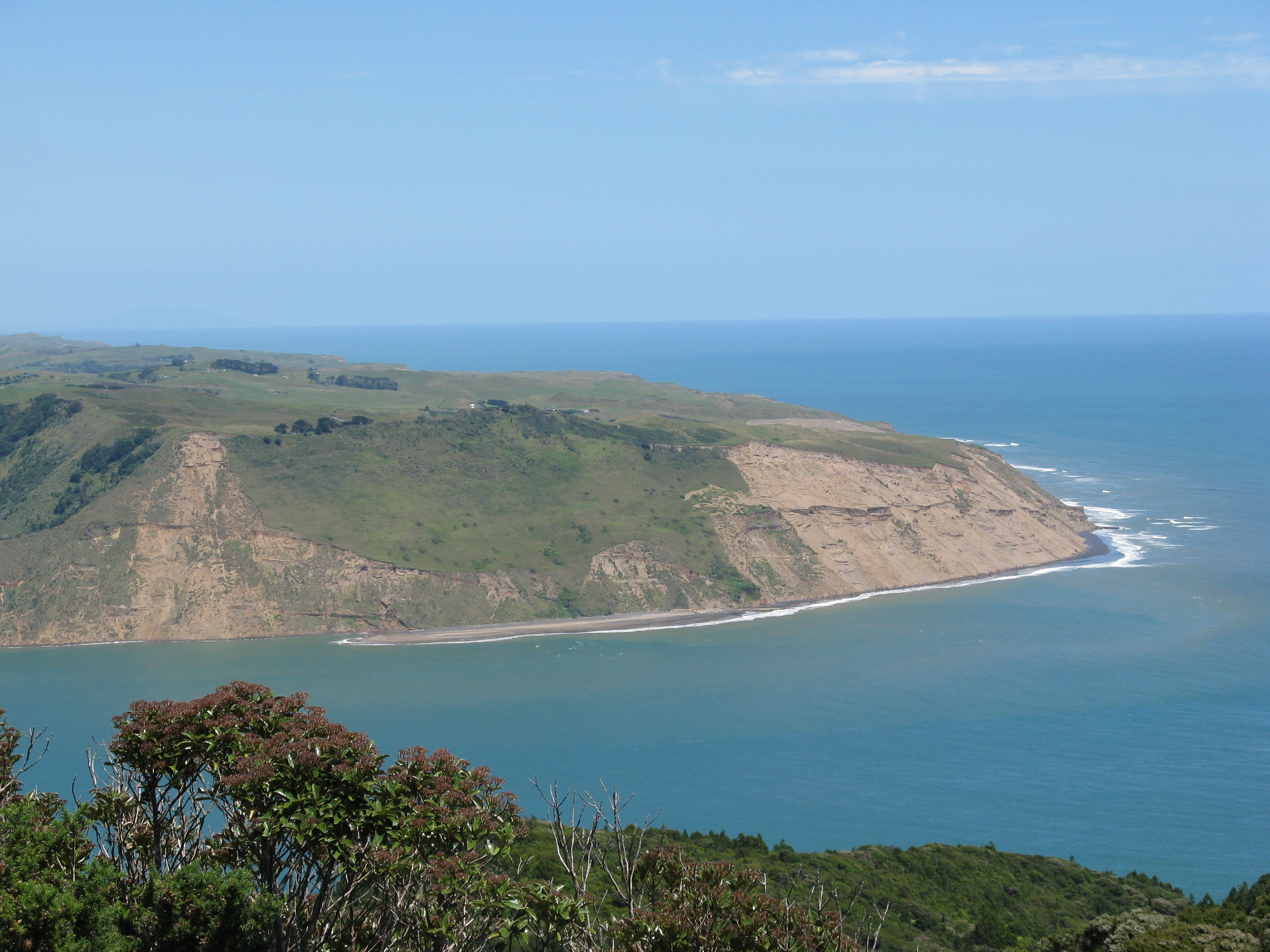
The South Head Viewed from above Burnett Head.

The Manukau Heads or the Manukau Harbour Heads is the name given to the two promontories that form the entrance to the Manukau Harbour – one of the two harbours of Auckland in New Zealand. The southern head, at the northern tip of Āwhitu Peninsula, is simply termed "The South Head", whereas the northern head is named "Burnett Head" (the term North Head is used to indicate a promontory in the nearby Waitematā Harbour). Both heads are hilly areas of land that rise steeply from the water to over 240m within less than 400m of the shoreline.

== History ==
In Pre-European times, the west coast of the Āwhitu Peninsula was the site of Paorae, a flat sand dune land which was a major kūmara (sweet potato) cultivation site for Tāmaki Māori iwi. The land eroded during the 18th century, however the sand from the dune feature continued to move northwards, creating vast sand banks in the Manukau Heads and at Whatipu. The foot of the South Head cliffs is the location of the Matatuahu archaeological site, one of the earliest archaeological sites in the Auckland Region.

The pronounced sand bar across the harbour mouth has limited shipping into the harbour since large European vessels arrived in the area. This limitation (which ensured an effective maximum ship size of about 1,000 tons in pre-modern times), was no barrier to early success of shipping to local ports in the harbour – but eventually meant that the Waitematā Harbour overtook the Manukau Harbour in prominence as a port location.

New Zealand's worst maritime disaster occurred just offshore in 1863 when HMS Orpheus ran aground on the Manukau Bar and sank with the loss of 189 lives. The area remains dangerous for watercraft, with one death each in 2005 and 2010 when pleasure craft capsized or were swamped near the bar.

The Manukau Harbour Bar was first crossed in a surf boat by a crew from Piha Surf Life Saving Club who rowed from Onehunga to Piha in over five hours in high swells and stiff winds in 1992. A crew from Piha had attempted this row in 1971 but was caught out by rising swells closing out the northern channel and after attempting to catch a "smaller" wave into the beach lost their boat when it was smashed on to the beach by a dumping wave.

== Climate ==
Climate data for Manukau Heads Lighthouse (1991–2020 normals, extremes 1984–2005, 2022–present)
Month	Jan	Feb	Mar	Apr	May	Jun	Jul	Aug	Sep	Oct	Nov	Dec	Year
Record high °C (°F)	29.1 (84.4)	29.2 (84.6)	28.2 (82.8)	24.5 (76.1)	22.7 (72.9)	19.6 (67.3)	19.2 (66.6)	20.7 (69.3)	20.7 (69.3)	23.6 (74.5)	24.0 (75.2)	25.9 (78.6)	29.2 (84.6)
Mean daily maximum °C (°F)	22.5 (72.5)	22.8 (73.0)	21.5 (70.7)	19.0 (66.2)	16.4 (61.5)	14.2 (57.6)	13.4 (56.1)	14.0 (57.2)	15.3 (59.5)	16.6 (61.9)	18.3 (64.9)	20.6 (69.1)	17.9 (64.2)
Daily mean °C (°F)	18.9 (66.0)	19.2 (66.6)	18.1 (64.6)	16.0 (60.8)	13.7 (56.7)	11.7 (53.1)	10.8 (51.4)	11.2 (52.2)	12.3 (54.1)	13.5 (56.3)	15.0 (59.0)	17.2 (63.0)	14.8 (58.7)
Mean daily minimum °C (°F)	15.2 (59.4)	15.6 (60.1)	14.6 (58.3)	13.1 (55.6)	11.0 (51.8)	9.2 (48.6)	8.1 (46.6)	8.4 (47.1)	9.3 (48.7)	10.4 (50.7)	11.7 (53.1)	13.8 (56.8)	11.7 (53.1)
Record low °C (°F)	8.2 (46.8)	7.1 (44.8)	8.1 (46.6)	6.4 (43.5)	4.2 (39.6)	3.1 (37.6)	1.7 (35.1)	−0.8 (30.6)	3.1 (37.6)	4.4 (39.9)	5.5 (41.9)	6.4 (43.5)	−0.8 (30.6)
Average rainfall mm (inches)	57.9 (2.28)	80.7 (3.18)	77.6 (3.06)	84.6 (3.33)	94.6 (3.72)	125.8 (4.95)	144.4 (5.69)	106.3 (4.19)	115.2 (4.54)	73.1 (2.88)	90.8 (3.57)	86.3 (3.40)	1,137.3 (44.79)
Source: NIWA
