= Whatipu =

Beach in New Zealand

- Beach
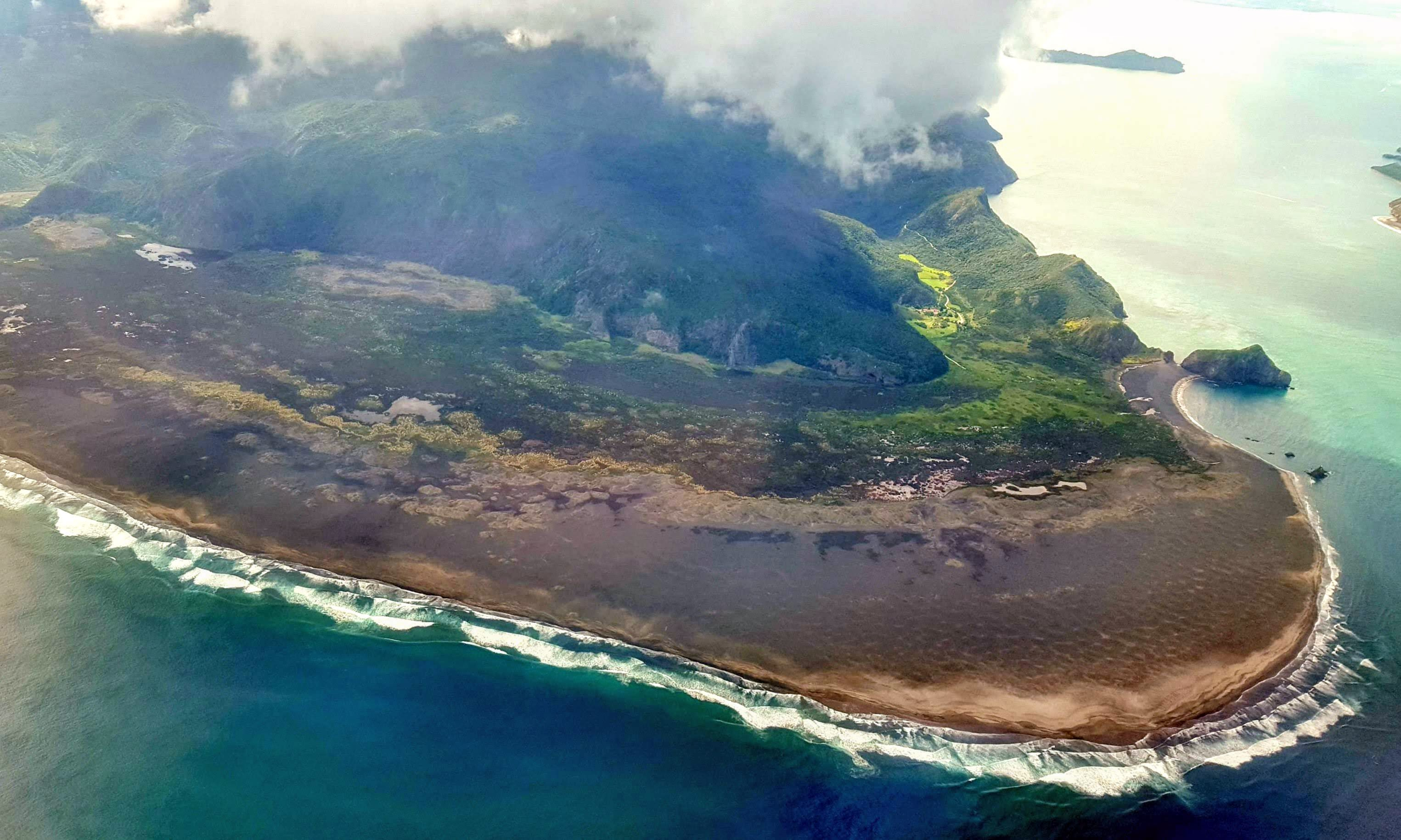
- North Manukau Head, the entry point to the Manukau Harbour and the southern terminus of Whatipu Beach
- Interactive map of Whatipu
- Coordinates: 37°01′48″S 174°28′48″E
- Location: Auckland Region, New Zealand

Whatipu is a remote beach on the west coast of the Auckland Region in the North Island of New Zealand. The Whatipu area has been managed as a scientific reserve by the Auckland Regional Council since 2002. The road to it is unsealed. To the south of Whatipu is Manukau Harbour. To the north is Karekare. Whatipu is located at the southern end of the Waitākere Ranges. Shifting sands have substantially changed the beach since the 1940s. Over 6 square kilometres has been added to the beach since then.

== Geography ==
Between 3 and 5 million years ago, tectonic forces between the Pacific Plate and Australian Plate uplifted the Waitākere Ranges and subsided the Manukau Harbour. Major features of Whatipu include Te Toka-Tapu-a-Kupe / Ninepin Rock and Paratutae Island, which are remnants of the Miocene era Waitākere Volcano. From the 1930s to the 1960s, sandy material began accumulating at Whatipu, creating a 1.5 km strip of sand, where plants and fresh water swamps developed. Much of the sandy material was formed from Paorae, a former flat sand dune that eroded in the 18th century.

The Whatipu area is predominantly an Exposed Coastal Ecosystem, dominated by sand dunes and pōhutukawa trees, as well as saltspray tolerant species such as Urostemon kirkii, taupata, Veronica obtusata and horokaka. The hilly Waitākere Ranges areas further from the beaches are dominated by a warm lowlands pūriri forest, with a narrow band of mānuka-dominated band of Stormy Coastal Hill Ecosystem.

== Pre-European history ==
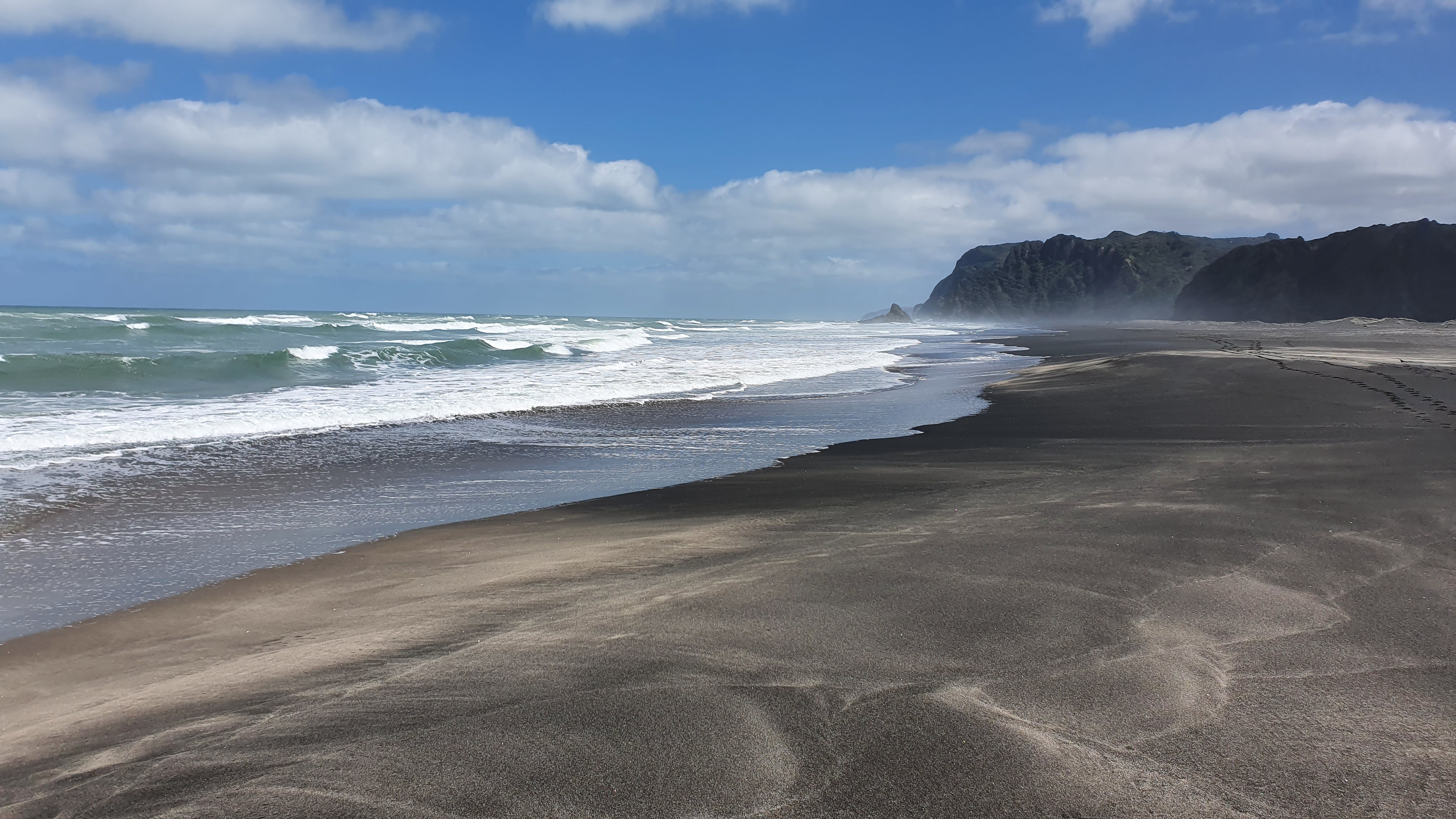
Looking northwards to Karekare Beach

The legendary voyager Kupe is said to have visited Whatipu when exploring New Zealand. Te Toka-Tapu-a-Kupe / Ninepin Rock at the southern end of Whatipu are named after his visit. In pre-European times the area was actively used by Māori, living along the coastline and river valleys. There are caves about 20 minutes walk from the carpark, but there is no access from the caves to the beach. These caves and rock shelters were used as refuges during times of war between the 16th and 18th centuries. Textile remains such as fishing nets, baskets, cloak fragments were collected from four archeological sites in the area in the early 1900s: one at Whatipu and three on Paratutae Island to the south east.

== European history ==
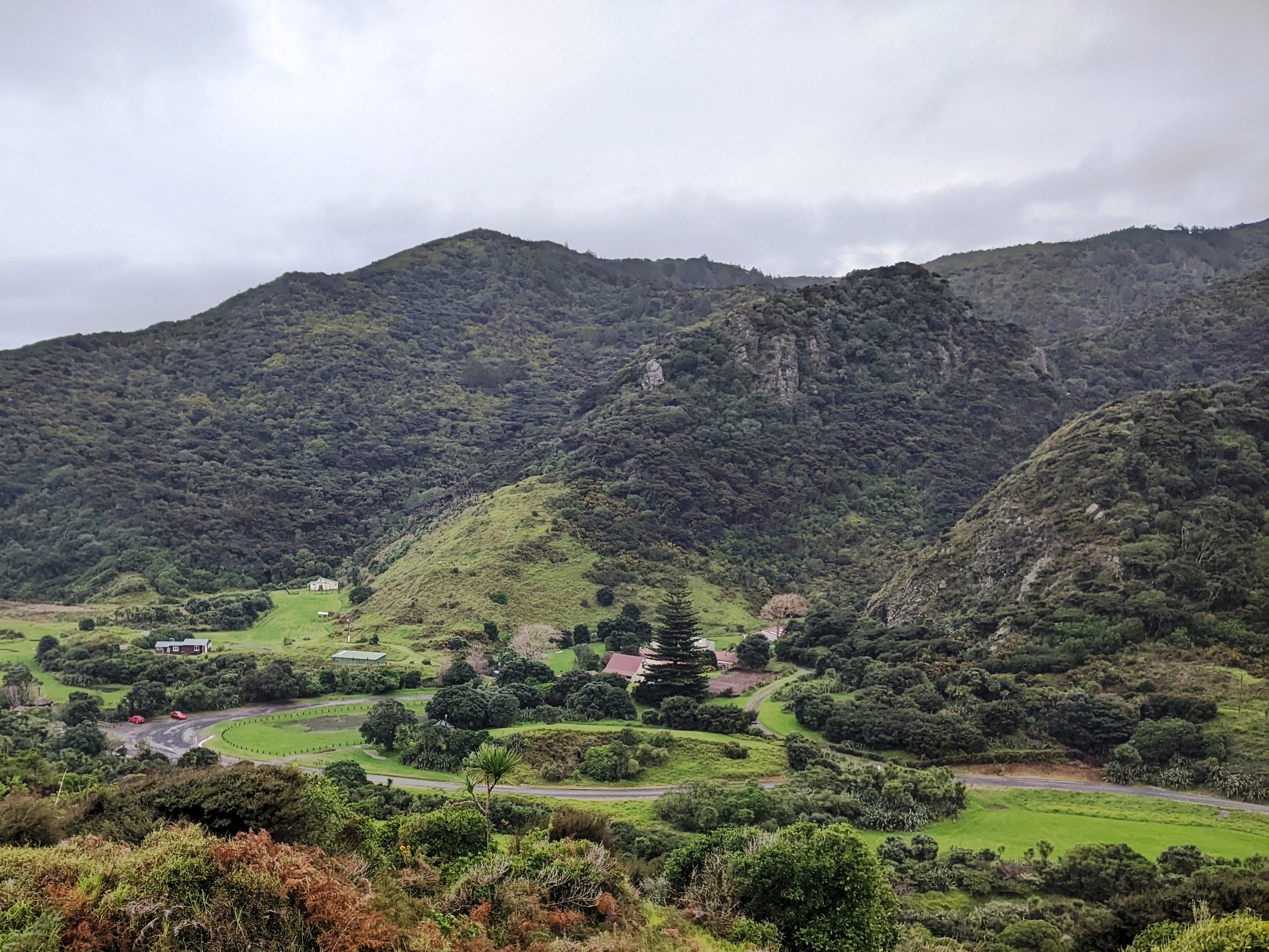
The settlement and carpark at Whatipu

Whatipu was part of the Hikurangi purchase by the Crown in 1853. The Te Kawerau tribe had reserves set aside at Bethells Beach and Piha.

HMS Orpheus ran aground just inside the Manukau Harbour entrance south of Whatipu in 1863 with the loss of 189 lives. It was the biggest shipping disaster in New Zealand history.

Nicholas Gibbons, a sawmill operator in St Johns, Newfoundland, came to New Zealand in 1853. In March 1854 they purchased land in the Waitakeres and started a large timber milling operation in Whatipu and the wider area that would last until the 1870s. The timber mill was built at Whatipu in 1867 to service the kauri trade. The Whatipu Stream was dammed during the establishment of the mill. A tramline was built to a second timber mill three kilometers north in 1870, and eventually extended up to Piha and Anawhata. The mills closed in 1886 when the kauri ran out. While the timbermill was open, mill workers used the larger caves in the area were as a popular venue for meetings, and in the early 20th century the largest cave was used for dances, but sand has since drifted into the cave and the dance floor is now covered by five metres of sand.

In the latter 19th century, Whatipu was used as black market port, where perfume, spirits and tobacco were smuggled into New Zealand. A road connecting Whatipu to Auckland was constructed in the 1920s.

=== Modern history and in the media ===
In 2005, the remains of a man who had been missing for four years were found by police at Whatipu's Destruction Gully. It was speculated that the man was the victim of an accident during fishing on the Manukau Harbour. In 2006, the location was featured on Ghost Hunt, a New Zealand paranormal television show. In the 21st century, Whatipu has been used for the Wild Turkey Off-Road Half Marathon/15 km. The Whatipu Beach Beacon is a lighthouse of the area.

== Notable buildings ==
Whatipu has four category II Auckland Council heritage listings. These are: Whatipu Lodge, an unnamed dwelling, Whatipu Wharf, and a commemorative plaque at Paratutai.

== Recreation ==
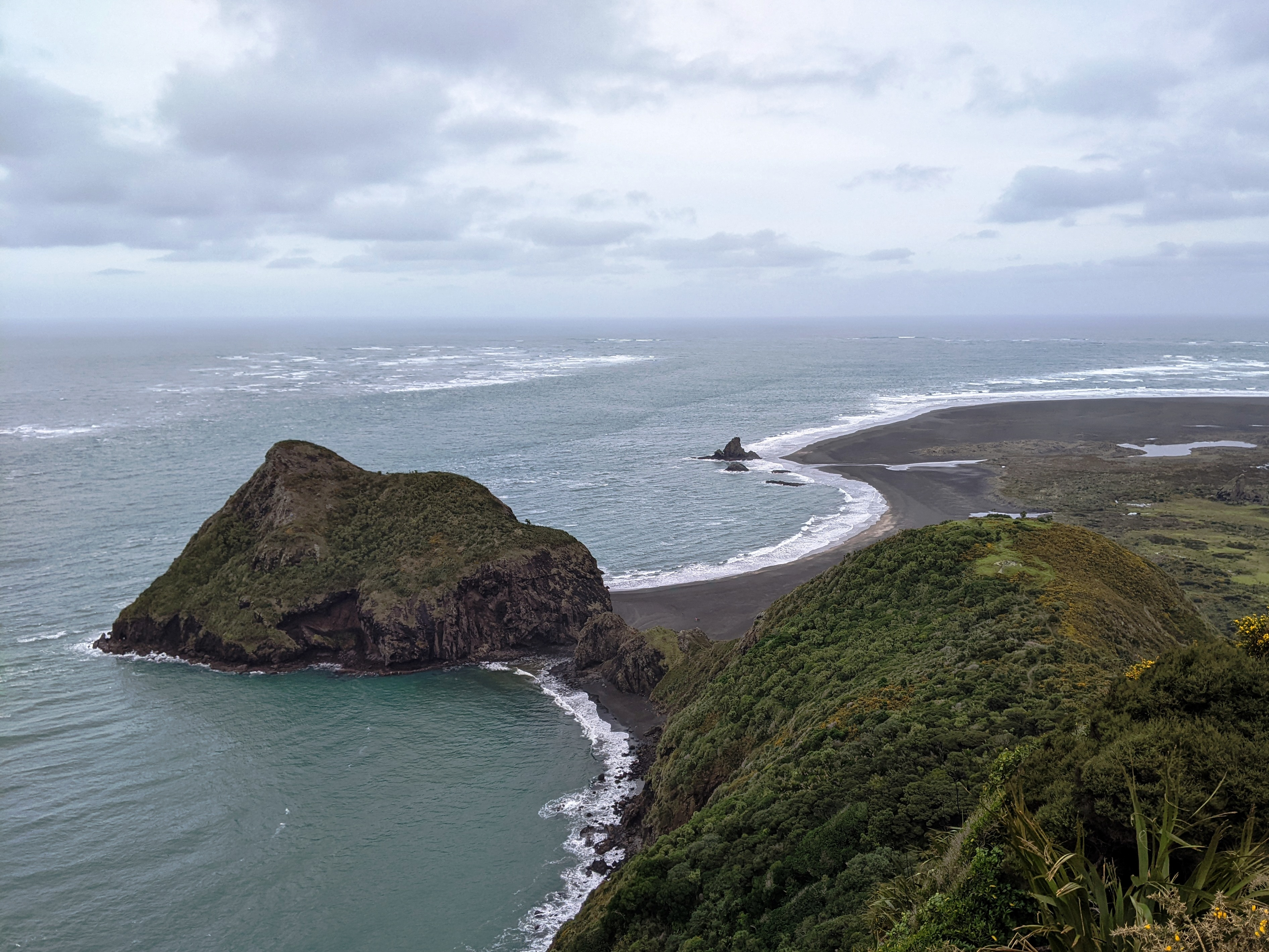
Paratutae Rock on the left with Whatipu beach behind it

The Whatipu beach does not have a surf patrol. Swimming may not be safe due to rips, in common with all beaches west of Auckland.

Whatipu is the starting point for the Whatipu-Gibbons Track & Kura-Omanawanui Tracks, a six-hour return walking track. It leads up the hill to the right of the carpark and is clearly marked. It follows the top of the cliffs to the Pararaha Valley where it descends to the beach at Pararaha point. It then follows the beach back to Whatipu. Paratutae Rock at the harbour entrance is difficult and particularly dangerous to climb down. The Kura-Omanawanui Tracks are the other notable walk out of Whatipu. Follows Kura Track eastwards alongside the stream through bush, then climbs steeply to Puriri Ridge and the Whatipu Road. Back via Omanawanui Track, a switchback ridge in open bush with views across the Manukau Harbour and the Whatipu valley to the west coast. Time 4 hours.
