= Paorae =

Coastal dune in the Auckland Region

Coordinates: 37.08°S 174.52°E

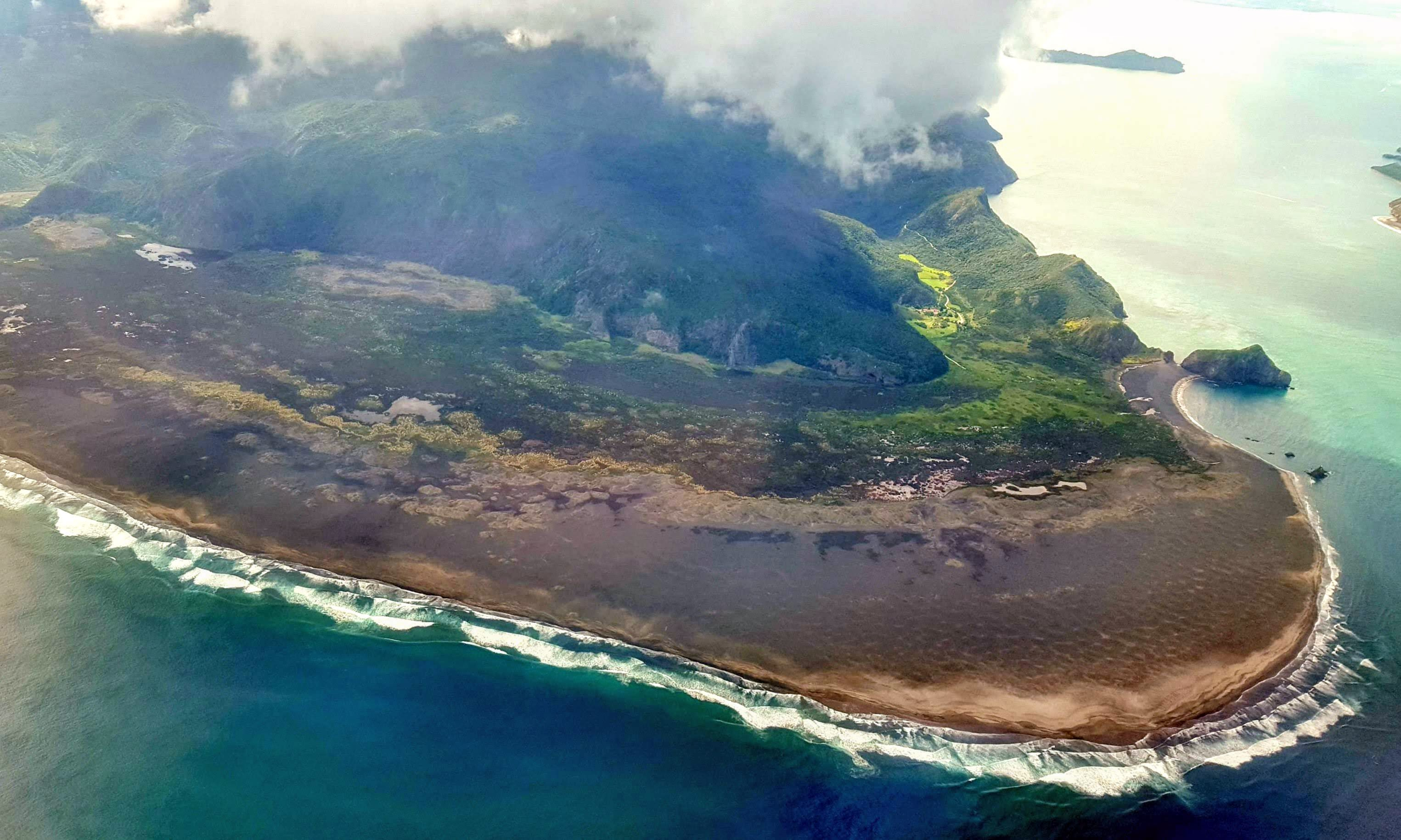
The sandbanks at Whatipu, which formed in the 1930s from sandy material from Paorae

Paorae was a migrating coastal dune, formerly located west of the Āwhitu Peninsula in the Auckland Region of New Zealand. Paorae was an important area for cultivating kūmara (sweet potato) and taro for Tāmaki Māori tribes Ngāiwi and Ngāoho, and later Waikato Tainui. The land eroded in the 18th century, becoming known as a legendary "Māori Atlantis" to European New Zealanders. Material from Paorae forms the Manukau Heads sandbars and the modern day beach at Whatipu, which began forming in the 1930s.

== Geology ==
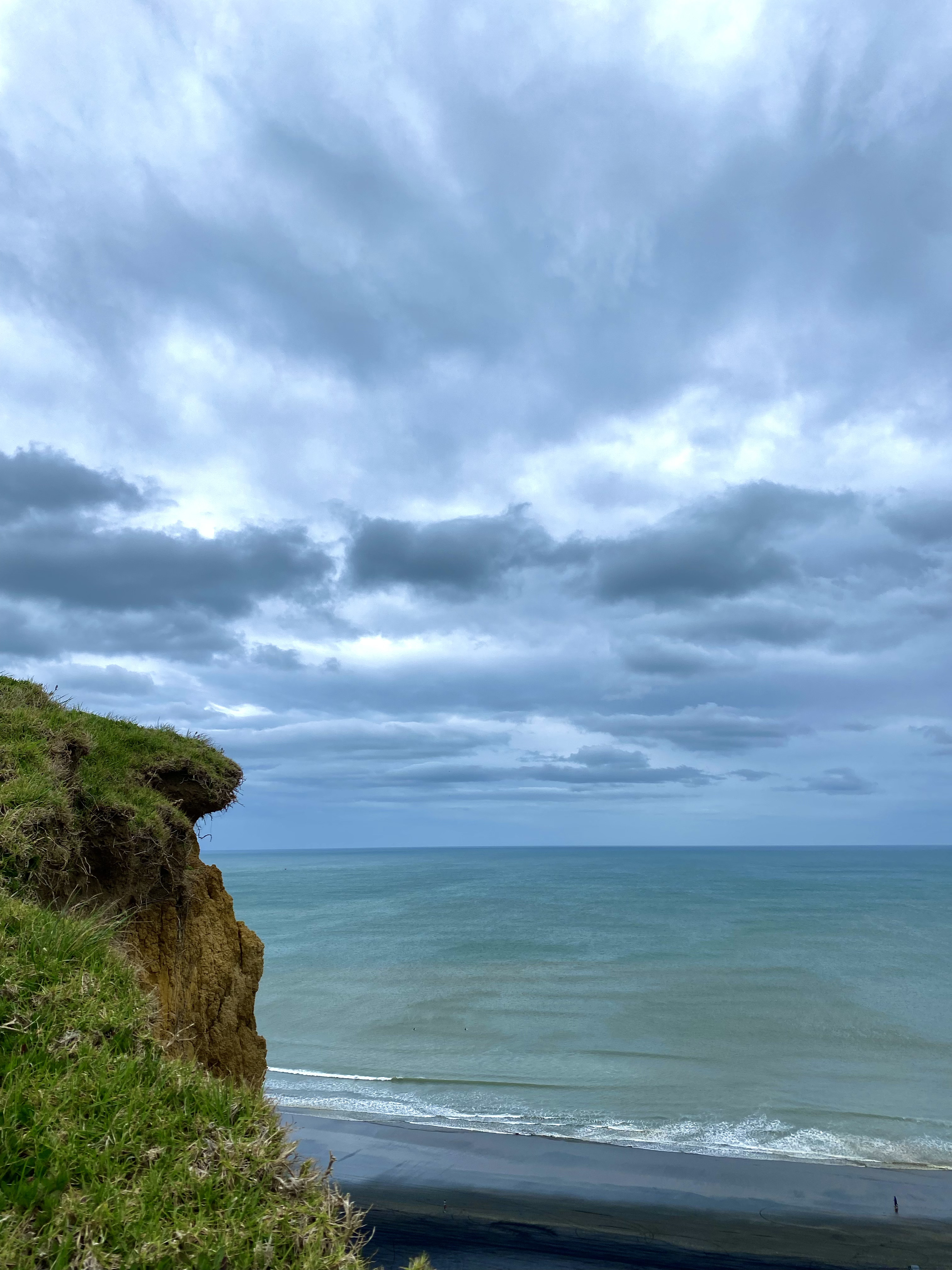
The Tasman Sea coast along the Āwhitu Peninsula, where Paorae was located

New Zealand geologist Bruce Hayward theorised that Paorae formed from accumulated volcanic material from the Hatepe eruption of the Taupō Volcano, which occurred 1,800 years ago. Sediment from the eruption washed down the Waikato River, forming a large sand bank north of the Waikato River mouth, along the Āwhitu Peninsula. The land eroded in the 18th century, but material from Paorae continues to move northwards up the west coast.

== History ==
=== Māori history ===
Much of what is known of traditional accounts of Paorae comes from historian James Cowan's discussions with Ngāti Mahuta rangatira Pātara Te Tuhi and Honana Maioha in 1898. Paorae was an important area for Tāmaki Māori tribes Ngāiwi and Ngāoho, and later Waikato Tainui. The area's loose soil made it ideal for the cultivation of kūmara (sweet potato) and taro, and was flourishing by 1400AD. The island was a source of fresh water, and was known as a source of eels. While temporary kāinga were found on the land, no lasting settlements were built. Most people who used the resources of the land primarily lived at pā on the Āwhitu Peninsula, including those at the Waitara Stream (Cochrane's Gap), Tipitai and an Āwhitu pā known as Te Pā o Kōkako. Archaeological evidence of Māori occupation of Tipitai, on the south head of the Manukau Heads, shows occupation of the area during the archaic period (c. 1300–c. 1500). Paorae may have only been the name used for the northern part of the sand dunes. Another recorded name for the feature is the Te Kawerau ā Maki name Papakiekie.

Over time, Paorae eroded into the Tasman Sea. This process was sped up during storms, which would remove much of the vegetation on Paorae. As the vegetation died, exposed sands would be blown away from the dunes. By the 18th century, Paorae had almost entirely eroded, except for a small remnant island known as Ngā Toku Rau o Puakirangi, found off the southern coast of the Manukau Heads. The last remnants of this island were submerged after a storm in 1936. By the late 19th and early 20th centuries, Paorae had become known to Europeans as the "Māori Atlantis".

=== Modern day ===
Between the 1930s and late 1960s, sandy material began accumulating at the North Manukau Head at Whatipu. Since the 1970s, a 1.5 km strip of sand was added to the coast at Whatipu, with vegetation and freshwater swamps forming inland from the shore. While the sand at Whatipu has not significantly changed much since the 1970s, the sand continues to move northwards towards Karekare, and will likely establish a beach at The Blowhole south of Piha, and an easily walkable passage between the beaches at Karekare and Piha.
