= Āwhitu Peninsula =

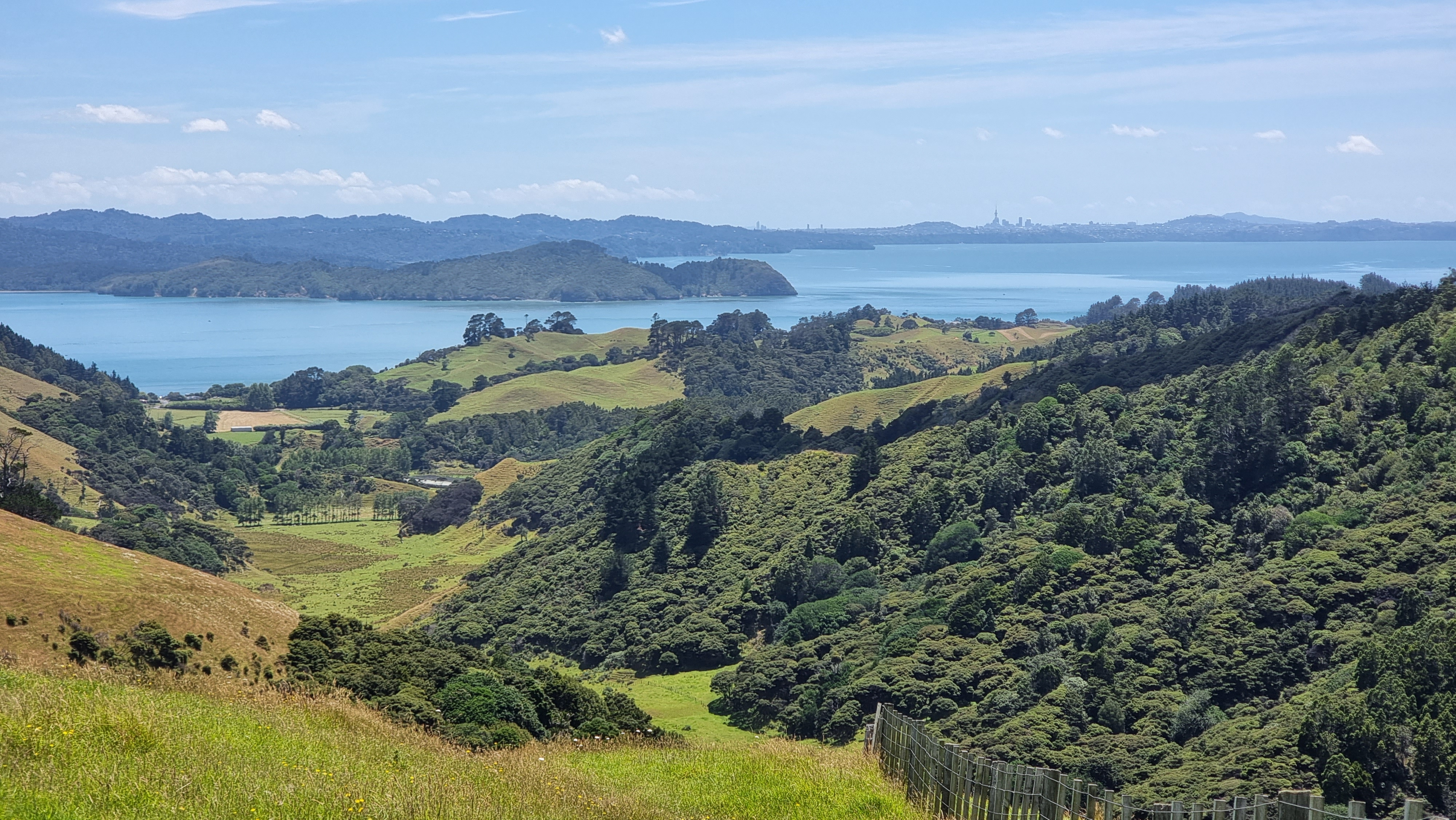
- Looking north from Āwhitu Peninsula bush and farmland to the Manukau Harbour and the Auckland CBD
- Interactive map of Āwhitu Peninsula
- Coordinates: 37.166°S 174.633°E
- Country: New Zealand
- Region: Auckland
- Ward: Franklin ward
- Local board: Franklin Local Board
- Electorates: Port Waikato; Hauraki-Waikato

Government
  - Territorial Authority: Auckland Council
  - Mayor of Auckland: Wayne Brown
  - Port Waikato MP: Andrew Bayly
  - Hauraki-Waikato MP: Hana-Rawhiti Maipi-Clarke

Area
  - Total: 221.40 km^{2} (85.48 sq mi)

Population (June 2025)
  - Total: 3,170
  - Density: 14.3/km^{2} (37.1/sq mi)

The Āwhitu Peninsula is a long peninsula in the North Island of New Zealand, extending north from the mouth of the Waikato River to the entrance to Manukau Harbour.

The Peninsula is bounded in the west by rugged cliffs over the Tasman Sea, but it slopes gently to the east, with low-lying pastoral and swamp land along the edge of the Waiuku River and Manukau Harbour. At the northern tip, the Manukau Heads rises to a 285-metre (935 ft) prominence above the entrance to the similarly named harbour. The nearby historic Manukau Heads Lighthouse is one of the few in the country open to the public.

The peninsula is relatively sparsely populated, despite its proximity to the centre of Auckland city (which lies 30 kilometres (19 miles) to the northeast). The largest settlement on or near the peninsula is Waiuku, which lies at the peninsula's isthmus. There are rural settlements at Grahams Beach and Matakawau Point.

== Geology ==
The Āwhitu Peninsula was formed geologically recently, from black volcanic sand from eruptions of Mount Taranaki mixed with white quartz and pumice sand, carried from the Waikato River. Prior to this, the Manukau Harbour was an extensive bay. The peninsula is a sand dune which developed over the last two million years.

Historically much of the peninsula was native forest dominated by taraire, with significant numbers of kauri, pūriri, tawa, karaka, kohekohe, tītoki, tōtara and kahikatea. Hamiltons Gap is a small gap in the western coast of the Āwhitu Peninsula, where the path of a stream has cut through the terrain.

== History ==
The peninsula is named after the traditional settlement of Āwhitu, located to the west of Ōrua Bay. The name refers to the regret Hoturoa, captain of the Tainui migratory canoe, felt as he left the area. The area has strong significance for Ngāti Te Ata Waiohua, and is the location of Tāhuna Marae.

The west coast of the Āwhitu Peninsula is the former site of Paorae, a flat sand dune land which was a major kūmara (sweet potato) cultivation area for Tāmaki Māori iwi. The land eroded during the 18th century. The northern shore of the Āwhitu Peninsula around the Manukau Heads is one of the earliest archaeological sites in the Auckland region.

In 1834, a Wesleyan mission was established at Ōrua Bay on the peninsula by William Woon. On 20 March 1840, Ōrua Bay became one of the locations where the Treaty of Waitangi was signed, by Manukau and Waikato chiefs. During the event, Apihai Te Kawau of Ngāti Whātua signed, but several Waikato Tainui chiefs refused.

From 1835, the kauri forest on the peninsula was logged. During the early colonial period, the native bush of the peninsula was converted to farmland. Between 1870 and 1900, the peninsula, alongside neighbouring Waiuku and Karaka were major centres for the kauri gum industry.

== Demographics ==
Āwhitu covers 221.40 km^{2} (85.48 sq mi) and had an estimated population of 3,170 as of June 2025, with a population density of 14 people per km^{2}.

Historical population
Year	Pop.	±% p.a.
2006	2,538	—
2013	2,424	−0.65%
2018	2,814	+3.03%
2023	3,081	+1.83%
The 2006 population is for a larger area of 221.56 km^{2}. Source:

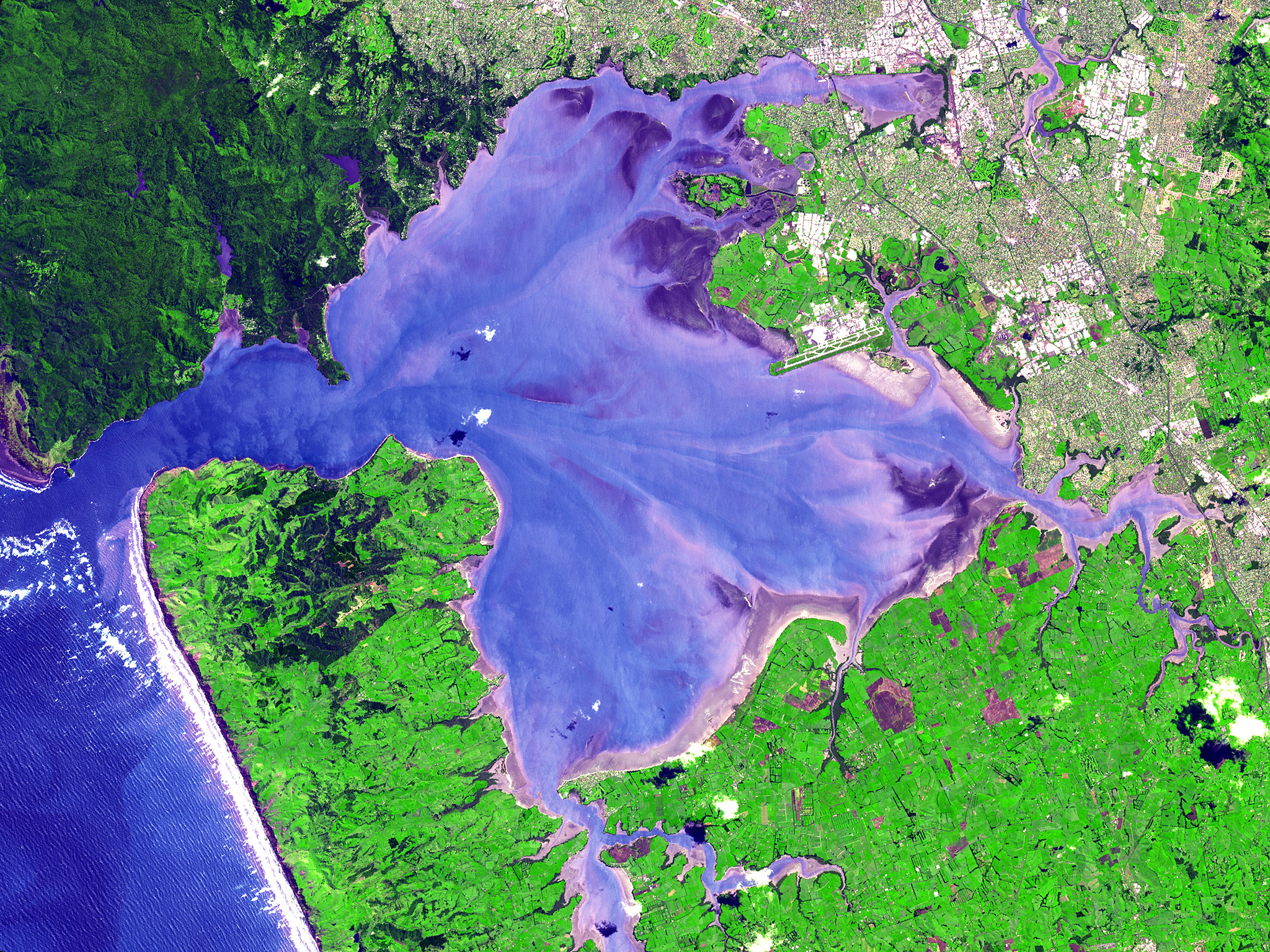
Satellite image of Manukau Harbour - the northern end of the Āwhitu Peninsula is shown lower left.

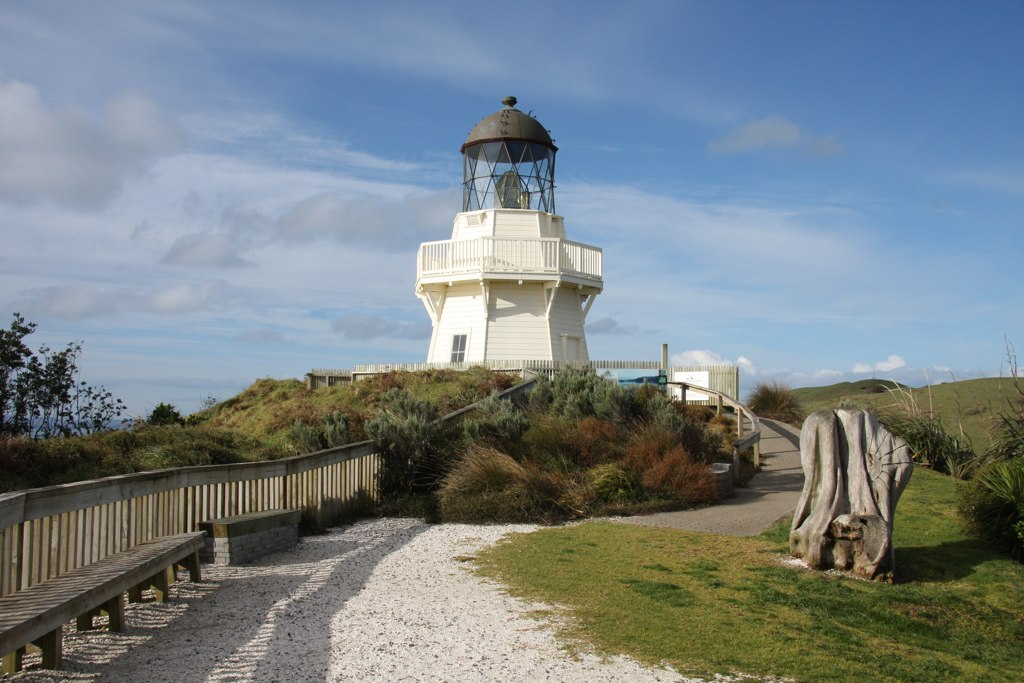
Manukau Heads lighthouse

Āwhitu had a population of 3,081 in the 2023 New Zealand census, an increase of 267 people (9.5%) since the 2018 census, and an increase of 657 people (27.1%) since the 2013 census. There were 1,578 males, 1,497 females and 6 people of other genders in 1,152 dwellings. 2.1% of people identified as LGBTIQ+. The median age was 49.8 years (compared with 38.1 years nationally). There were 498 people (16.2%) aged under 15 years, 384 (12.5%) aged 15 to 29, 1,527 (49.6%) aged 30 to 64, and 672 (21.8%) aged 65 or older.

People could identify as more than one ethnicity. The results were 87.0% European (Pākehā); 16.2% Māori; 3.9% Pasifika; 5.3% Asian; 0.6% Middle Eastern, Latin American and African New Zealanders (MELAA); and 2.2% other, which includes people giving their ethnicity as "New Zealander". English was spoken by 98.4%, Māori language by 2.7%, Samoan by 0.4%, and other languages by 6.7%. No language could be spoken by 1.0% (e.g. too young to talk). New Zealand Sign Language was known by 0.4%. The percentage of people born overseas was 17.9, compared with 28.8% nationally.

Religious affiliations were 24.3% Christian, 1.2% Hindu, 0.4% Islam, 0.6% Māori religious beliefs, 0.5% Buddhist, 0.5% New Age, 0.1% Jewish, and 1.7% other religions. People who answered that they had no religion were 61.9%, and 9.0% of people did not answer the census question.

Of those at least 15 years old, 387 (15.0%) people had a bachelor's or higher degree, 1,476 (57.1%) had a post-high school certificate or diploma, and 714 (27.6%) people exclusively held high school qualifications. The median income was $37,000, compared with $41,500 nationally. 315 people (12.2%) earned over $100,000 compared to 12.1% nationally. The employment status of those at least 15 was that 1,242 (48.1%) people were employed full-time, 339 (13.1%) were part-time, and 78 (3.0%) were unemployed.

== Education ==
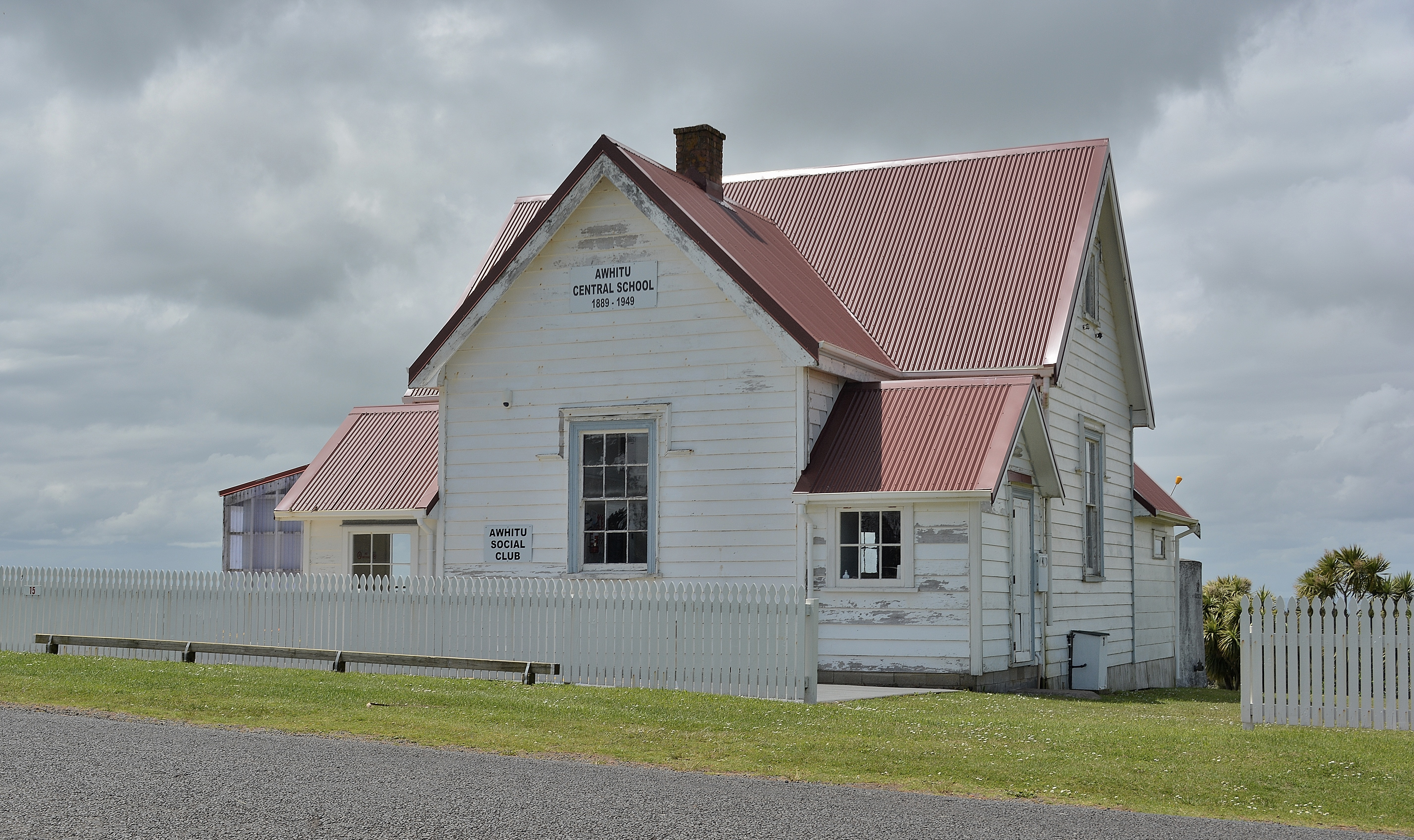
The former Awhitu Central School

Awhitu District School and Waipipi School are coeducational full primary schools (years 1–8) with rolls of 108 and 109 students respectively as of July 2026.

== Biodiversity ==
The Peninsula has a high sympatric diversity of native New Zealand land snails. Communities of >70 native species in a 4 ha patch of bush can be found here, whereas in other parts of the world, 15 sympatric land snail species would be considered high. Grazing and other habitat disturbances can negatively impact this diversity.

== Climate ==
Climate data for Manukau Heads Lighthouse (1991–2020 normals, extremes 1984–2005, 2022–present)
Month	Jan	Feb	Mar	Apr	May	Jun	Jul	Aug	Sep	Oct	Nov	Dec	Year
Record high °C (°F)	29.1 (84.4)	29.2 (84.6)	28.2 (82.8)	24.5 (76.1)	22.7 (72.9)	19.6 (67.3)	19.2 (66.6)	20.7 (69.3)	20.7 (69.3)	23.6 (74.5)	24.0 (75.2)	25.9 (78.6)	29.2 (84.6)
Mean daily maximum °C (°F)	22.5 (72.5)	22.8 (73.0)	21.5 (70.7)	19.0 (66.2)	16.4 (61.5)	14.2 (57.6)	13.4 (56.1)	14.0 (57.2)	15.3 (59.5)	16.6 (61.9)	18.3 (64.9)	20.6 (69.1)	17.9 (64.2)
Daily mean °C (°F)	18.9 (66.0)	19.2 (66.6)	18.1 (64.6)	16.0 (60.8)	13.7 (56.7)	11.7 (53.1)	10.8 (51.4)	11.2 (52.2)	12.3 (54.1)	13.5 (56.3)	15.0 (59.0)	17.2 (63.0)	14.8 (58.7)
Mean daily minimum °C (°F)	15.2 (59.4)	15.6 (60.1)	14.6 (58.3)	13.1 (55.6)	11.0 (51.8)	9.2 (48.6)	8.1 (46.6)	8.4 (47.1)	9.3 (48.7)	10.4 (50.7)	11.7 (53.1)	13.8 (56.8)	11.7 (53.1)
Record low °C (°F)	8.2 (46.8)	7.1 (44.8)	8.1 (46.6)	6.4 (43.5)	4.2 (39.6)	3.1 (37.6)	1.7 (35.1)	−0.8 (30.6)	3.1 (37.6)	4.4 (39.9)	5.5 (41.9)	6.4 (43.5)	−0.8 (30.6)
Average rainfall mm (inches)	57.9 (2.28)	80.7 (3.18)	77.6 (3.06)	84.6 (3.33)	94.6 (3.72)	125.8 (4.95)	144.4 (5.69)	106.3 (4.19)	115.2 (4.54)	73.1 (2.88)	90.8 (3.57)	86.3 (3.40)	1,137.3 (44.79)
Source: NIWA
