= Tied island =

Island that is connected to land only by a tombolo

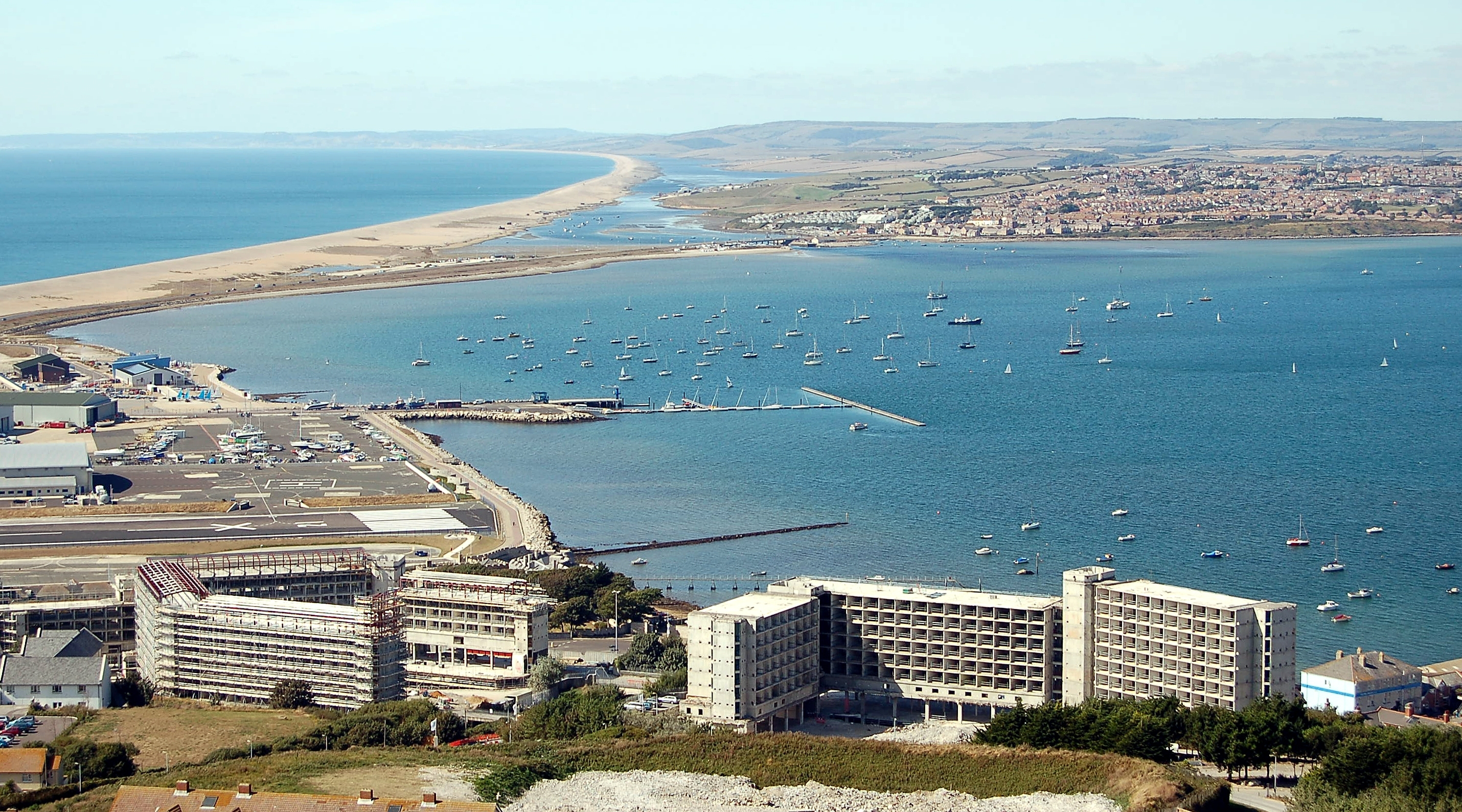
View from the Isle of Portland looking towards the mainland of Great Britain. Chesil Beach on the left connects the tied island to the mainland

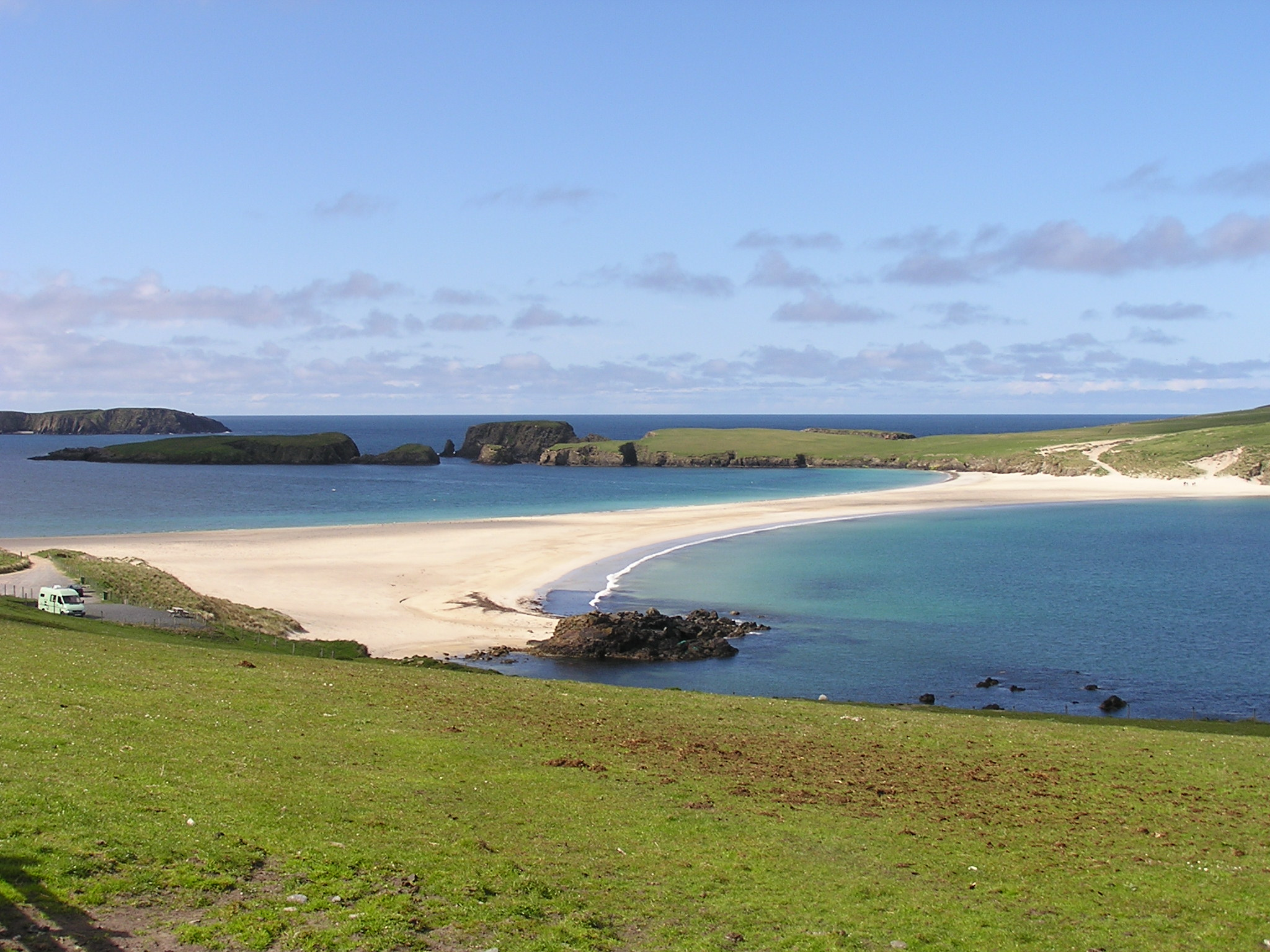
St Ninian's Isle, a tied island during all but the very highest of tides

A tied island or land-tied island is a landform consisting of an island that is connected to the mainland or another island only by a tombolo, which is an isthmus of beach materials connected to land at both ends. St Ninian's Isle in the Shetland Islands off the north coast of Scotland is an example: it was once an island but is now linked to the mainland.

Other examples include Maury Island, Washington in Puget Sound, Coronado, California, and Nahant, Massachusetts in the United States; Paraguana Peninsula in Venezuela; Barrenjoey, New South Wales and Wedge Island, Western Australia; Paratutae Island in New Zealand; the Argentario and Sestri Levante in Italy, Mount Hakodate in Japan, Howth Head in Ireland; Davaar Island, Campbeltown, Scotland; Chefoo island in Yantai, China; and Cheung Chau in Hong Kong.

The Isle of Portland, in England, is also described as a tied island, but geographers now believe that Chesil Beach, which connects the island to the mainland, is a barrier beach that has moved eastwards, rather than a tombolo, which would have been formed by the effect of the island on waves.

Paniquian Island, also known as Isla Boquete, is a small tied island in Puerto Galera, a popular tourist destination in the Philippines. The island is connected to the main island of Mindoro by a small tombolo, which is submerged only a few times per year.

== See also ==
- Presque-isle – Peninsula with narrow connection to mainland (name from French for "almost island")
- Peninsula – Land feature
- Tidal island – Island accessible by foot at low tide
