= Makarau River =

River in the Auckland Region, New Zealand

- Mouth of the Makarau River Makarau River (New Zealand)
- Route of the Makarau River

Location
- Country: New Zealand
- Region: Auckland Region

Physical characteristics
- Source
  - location: Confluence of the Tahekeroa River and Haruru Stream
  - coordinates: 36.55713°S 174.52118°E
- Mouth: Kaipara Harbour
  - coordinates: 36.5557°S 174.4409°E
- Length: 13 km (8 mi)

Basin features
- Progression: Makarau River → Kaipara Harbour → Tasman Sea
- Tributaries
  - left: Waitangi Stream, Wheraroa Creek
  - right: Rauhori Stream, Kakanui Creek

The Makarau River is a river of the Auckland Region of New Zealand's North Island. The river rises some 10 kilometres (6 mi) north of Kaukapakapa, flowing west before entering the south of the Kaipara Harbour. The river flows from the confluence of the Tahekeroa River and Haruru Stream.

The Makarau River served as the boundary between Waitemata and Rodney Counties.

== See also ==
- List of rivers of New Zealand
