= Manukau Harbour =

Harbour in Auckland, New Zealand

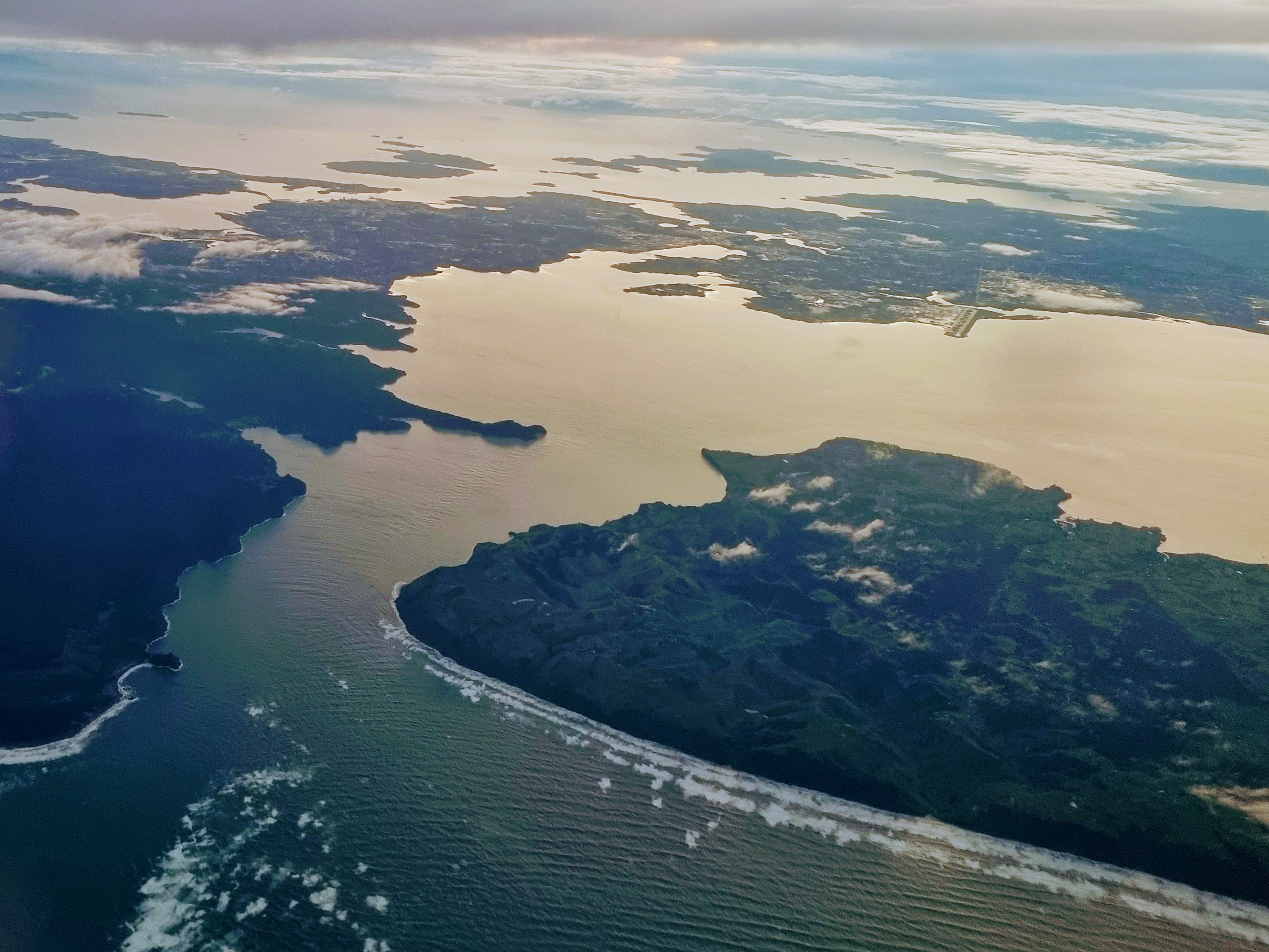
- Aerial view of the Manukau Harbour
- Interactive map of Manukau Harbour
- Location: Auckland Region, New Zealand
- Coordinates: 37°00′S 174°40′E
- River sources: Big Muddy Creek, Harania Creek, Little Muddy Creek, Pukaki Creek, Tahekeroa River, Taihiki River, Waiuku River
- Ocean/sea sources: Tasman Sea
- Basin countries: New Zealand
- Islands: Ngarango Otainui Island, Pararekau Island, Paratutae Island, Puketutu Island, Te Toka-Tapu-a-Kupe / Ninepin Rock, Wiroa Island
- Sections/sub-basins: Māngere Inlet, Pahurehure Inet, Waiuku Inlet
- Settlements: Little Huia, Huia, Cornwallis, Parau, Auckland, Kingseat, Clarks Beach, Glenbrook, Waiuku, Āwhitu

The Manukau Harbour is the second largest natural harbour in New Zealand by area. It is located to the southwest of the Auckland isthmus, and opens out into the Tasman Sea.

== Geography ==
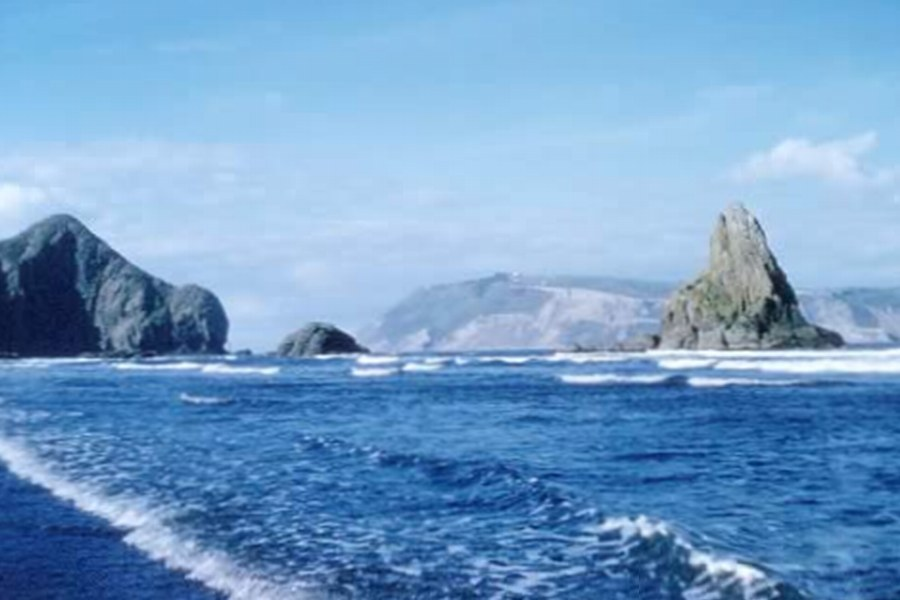
The Manukau Harbour Heads in 1960. The area in the foreground has since naturally filled with sand past the rock to the right of the photo.

The harbour mouth is between the northern head ("Burnett Head" / "Ohaka Head") located at the southern end of the Waitākere Ranges and South Head at the end of the Āwhitu Peninsula reaching up from close to the mouth of the Waikato River. The mouth is only 1800 metres wide, but after a nine kilometre channel it opens up into a roughly square basin 20 kilometres in width. The harbour has a water surface area of 394 square kilometres. There is a tidal variation of up to 4 metres, a very substantial change, especially since the harbour, being silted up with almost 10 million years of sedimentation, is rather shallow itself.

Because of the large harbour area and narrow mouth between the Manukau Heads, tidal flow is rapid and a bar at the mouth makes navigating in or out of the harbour dangerous. New Zealand's most tragic shipwreck occurred on the bar in 1863 when HMS Orpheus ran aground in clear weather with a loss of 189 lives. For this reason, along with the harbour's shallowness, it is not Auckland's favoured port, and, with only one short wharf, the facilities at Onehunga are tiny compared to the other Ports of Auckland facilities on the Waitematā Harbour along the northeast of the isthmus.

The harbour has three main arms. The Māngere Inlet at the northeast lies close to Auckland's central city area, with the inner suburbs of Onehunga and Te Papapa situated close to its northern shore. The Ōtāhuhu and Māngere urban areas lie south of this arm, which is crossed by the Māngere Bridge. In the southeast is the Papakura Channel, which extends into the urban area of Papakura. In the southwest a further inlet known as the Waiuku River reaches south to the town of Waiuku. The harbour reaches into Māngere Lagoon, which occupies a volcanic crater. Auckland Airport is located close to the harbour's eastern shore.

== Geology ==
The Manukau Harbour is a drowned river valley system, which formed between 3 and 5 million years ago when tectonic forces between the Pacific Plate and Australian Plate uplifted the Waitākere Ranges and subsided the Manukau Harbour. It began as an open bay, eventually forming as a sheltered harbour as elongated sand dune barriers formed at the harbour's mouth. Over the last two million years, the harbour has cycled between periods of being a forested river valley and a flooded harbour, depending on changes in the global sea level. The present harbour formed approximately 8,000 years ago, after the Last Glacial Maximum.

== Names and etymology ==
There are various traditions associated with the naming of the harbour. A Tainui tradition involves the crew of the Tainui. As they crossed Te Tō Waka (the portage at Ōtāhuhu between the Manukau Harbour and the Tāmaki River), the crew believed they heard voices of people on the other side. When they reached the harbour, they found that this was only birds ("Manu kau").

Another Tainui tradition involves Hoturoa, the captain of the Tainui waka. This tradition involves the naming of the Manukau Heads opening and sandbars, which is known as Te Manuka-o-Hotunui or Te Manukanuka-o-Hotunui, describing the anxiety Hoturoa felt when attempting to navigate this passage. The name, originally used for just the mouth of the harbour, became used for the entire harbour over time.

Other traditions hold that it is a corruption of mānuka, being a descriptive name for the number of mānuka shrubs growing around the harbour, while another asserts that Manukau is the name of a chief who died in the waters of the harbour.

Another traditional name for the harbour is Nga-tai-o-Rakataura, referring to Rakatāura / Hape, the tohunga of the Tainui. During the early colonial era of Auckland, an attempt was made to rename the harbour Symonds Harbour, after the late William Cornwallis Symonds, who died in 1841, battling a storm in the harbour.

== History ==
The harbour was an important historical waterway for Māori. It had several portages to the Pacific Ocean and to the Waikato River, and various villages and pā (hill forts) clustered around it. Snapper, flounder, mullet, scallops, cockles and pipi provided food in plentiful amounts. In Te Kawerau ā Maki tradition, the taniwha Paikea guards the Manukau Harbour and Waitākere Ranges coastline.

Cornwallis, on the Karangahape Peninsula, was the first site for the future city of Auckland. However, because of fraudulent land sales and rugged conditions, the settlement was mostly abandoned in the 1840s. The surrounding bush clad hills had vast amounts of kauri removed for milling and shipped from a wharf on Paratutai to either the other end of the harbour at Onehunga for use in house building in the new city of Auckland, or along the coast to other New Zealand settlements. The last mills were abandoned in the early 1920s.

European settlement of the area was thus almost often an outgrowth of the Waitematā Harbour-centred settlement, as these settlers spread south and west through the isthmus and reached the Manukau Harbour. One of the few separate earlier European settlements was Onehunga, from where some raiding of enemy settlements occurred during the New Zealand wars, and which later became a landing point for kauri and other products landed by ship and canoe from the south, the shipping route being shorter than the one along the east coast to the Waitematā Harbour. However, the combination of the difficult entry into the harbour, which limited ships to about 1,000 tons maximum, and the extension of the railway to Onehunga in 1873 made naval traffic on the harbour less important again, though the Port of Onehunga can trace its origins to this time.

Construction of a canal between the Manukau and the Waitemata was considered in the early 1900s, and the Auckland and Manukau Canal Act 1908 was passed to allow authorities to take privately owned land for this purpose. However, no serious work (or land take) was undertaken. The act was reported as technically still being in force as of 2008, but was repealed on 1 November 2010. A 2,700 ft (0.82 km) canal reserve, 2 ch (40 m) wide, remains in place.

== Recreation ==
The harbour is popular for fishing, though entry to the water is difficult with few all-tide boat ramps; often local beaches are used. The harbour also houses five active sailing clubs, three on the southern side, one near Māngere Bridge, and one on the northern side. Since 1988, there has been an annual interclub competition, hosted by each club in rotation.

== Ecological threats ==
Despite all that is precious about the Manukau, it is under ongoing threat from constant development and growth, with the pollution and damage that brings. Currently, according to the State of Auckland Marine Report Card, the harbour has a D-rating overall, based on water quality, contaminants and sediment, and ecology.

Careful development through best-practice land use and integrated management is required to reverse this situation and secure a healthy, productive and sustainable resource for future generations.

In response to concern about the deteriorating state of the Manukau Harbour and the urgent need for a collaborative response to improve its condition, the Manukau Harbour Forum was created in November 2010 to advocate for the restoration of Manukau Harbour.
