= Edward Lofley =

Soldier, spa proprietor, tourist guide, journalist, character

Edward Lofley (c. 1839–1889) was a New Zealand soldier, spa proprietor, tourist guide, and journalist. He was born in Headingley, a suburb of Leeds, in 1839. He fought in the Waikato War and at some point, married a Maori wife.
