= Te Toka-Tapu-a-Kupe / Ninepin Rock =

Volcanic rock at the mouth of the Manukau harbour

Native name: Te Toka-Tapu-a-Kupe
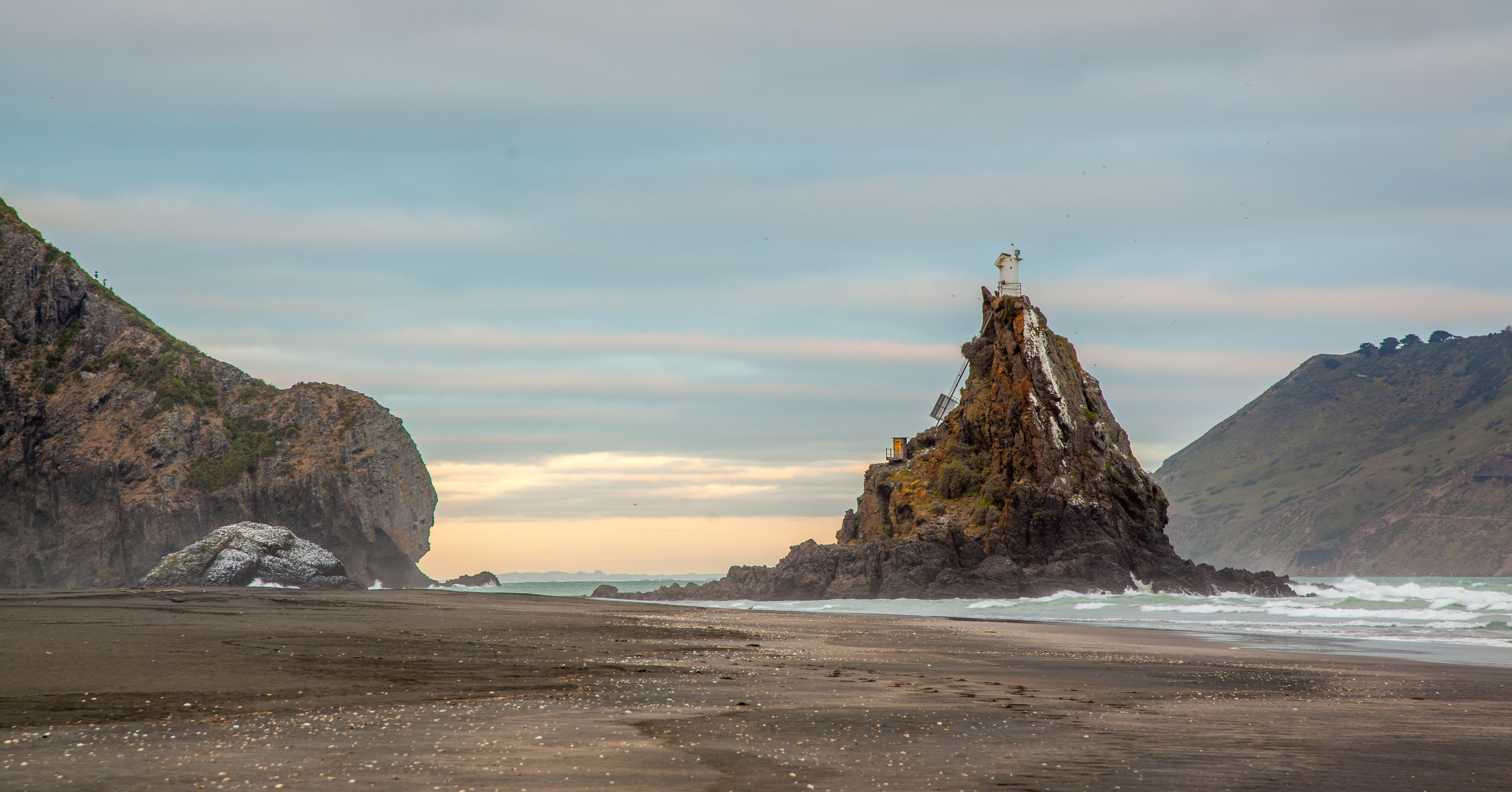
- Interactive map of Te Toka-Tapu-a-Kupe / Ninepin Rock

Geography
- Location: Auckland
- Coordinates: 37°03′02″S 174°30′13″E
- Adjacent to: Manukau Harbour, Tasman Sea
- Highest elevation: 29 m (95 ft)

Administration
- New Zealand

Te Toka-Tapu-a-Kupe / Ninepin Rock is an island at the mouth of the Manukau Harbour, at Whatipu in the Waitākere Ranges area.

== Geology ==
The island is a volcanic plug of the Miocene era Waitākere Volcano, composed of stratified rudite and intrusive andesite. The rock is what remains of one of the volcano's funnel-shaped vents on the eastern side of the mountain, which was uplifted from the sea between 3 and 5 million years ago. The island is a volcanic plug of the Miocene era Waitākere Volcano, composed of stratified rudite and intrusive andesite. The rock is what remains of one of the volcano's funnel-shaped vents on the eastern side of the mountain, which was uplifted from the sea 17 million years ago. As the volcano aged and eroded, the vent filled with collapsed lava, scoria and volcanic bombs, until it formed into its modern-day shape.

== History ==
The traditional name for the rock, Te Toka-Tapu-a-Kupe, refers to the Polynesian navigator Kupe. According to Te Kawerau ā Maki oral history, Kupe chanted a karakia (ritual song) and cast his marowhara (traditional clothing) into the sea, causing the Tasman Sea to become too rough for his pursuers to catch up to him.

The island was referred to by various variations of the name Ninepin Rock by European settlers, including Ninepins Rock and The Nine Pins. In the mid-19th century, Te Toka-Tapu-a-Kupe / Ninepin Rock was an island at high tide, however over time joined the mainland, due to the changing sand dunes of Whatipu.

In the 1860s, a signal mast was constructed on Te Toka-Tapu-a-Kupe / Ninepin Rock, to aid the logging communities of the area, and ships that navigated the mouth of the Manukau Harbour. The island is now the location of a trig station.
