= Tāhekeroa River =

River in the Auckland Region, New Zealand

- Mouth of the Tāhekeroa River Tāhekeroa River (New Zealand)
- Route of the Tāhekeroa River

Location
- Country: New Zealand
- Region: Auckland Region

Physical characteristics
- Source
  - coordinates: 36.5371°S 174.6083°E
- Mouth: Makarau River
  - coordinates: 36.55733°S 174.52174°E
- Length: 8 km (5.0 mi)

Basin features
- Progression: Tāhekeroa River → Makarau River → Kaipara Harbour → Tasman Sea

The Tāhekeroa River is a river of the Auckland Region of New Zealand's North Island. It flows generally southwest to reach the Makarau River eight kilometres north of Kaukapakapa.

== See also ==
- List of rivers of New Zealand
