= HMS Orpheus (1860) =

British naval corvette (sank 1863)

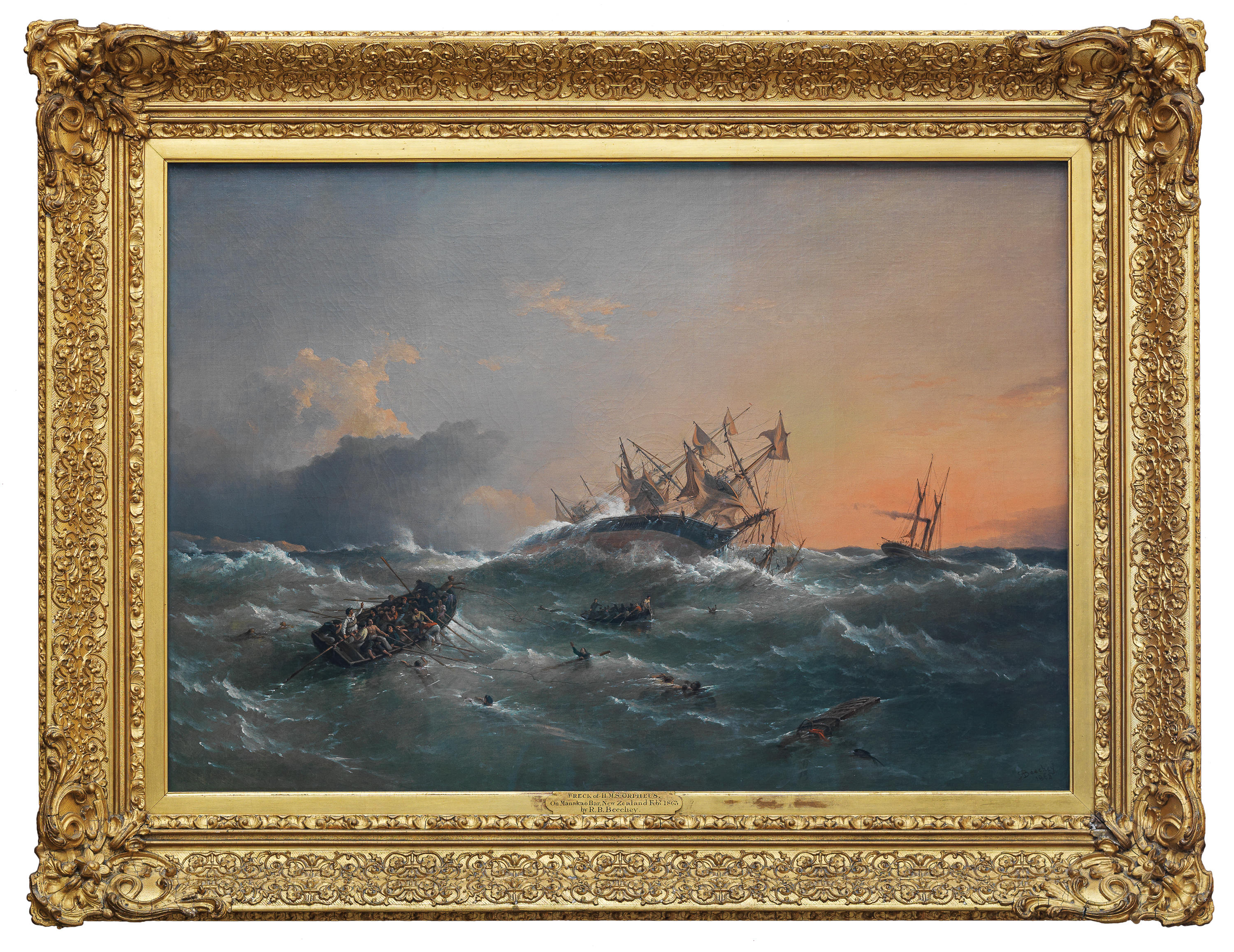
- Richard Brydges Beechey's 1863 painting of the disaster.

History

United Kingdom
- Name: HMS Orpheus
- Namesake: Orpheus, a figure from Greek mythology, king of the Thracian tribe Cicones.
- Ordered: 1 April 1857
- Builder: Chatham Dockyard
- Laid down: 12 May 1858
- Launched: 23 June 1860
- Commissioned: Portsmouth 24 October 1861
- Fate: Wrecked 7 February 1863

General characteristics
- Class & type: Jason-class corvette
- Displacement: 2,365 tons
- Tons burthen: 1,702 bm
- Length: 225 ft (69 m)
- Beam: 40 ft (12 m)
- Draught: 18 ft 0 in (5.5 m) (forward); 19 ft 9 in (6.0 m) (aft)
- Installed power: 400 nominal horsepower; 1,333 indicated horsepower (994 kW)
- Propulsion: 2-cylinder horizontal single-expansion engine; 4 × boilers; 4 × furnaces; Single screw
- Sail plan: Full-rigged ship
- Speed: 11.1 knots (20.6 km/h)
- Complement: 258
- Armament: 20 × 8-inch (68 pdr/65 cwt) muzzle-loading smoothbore broadside guns; 1 × pivot-mounted 7-inch (110 pdr/82 cwt) Armstrong breech loader

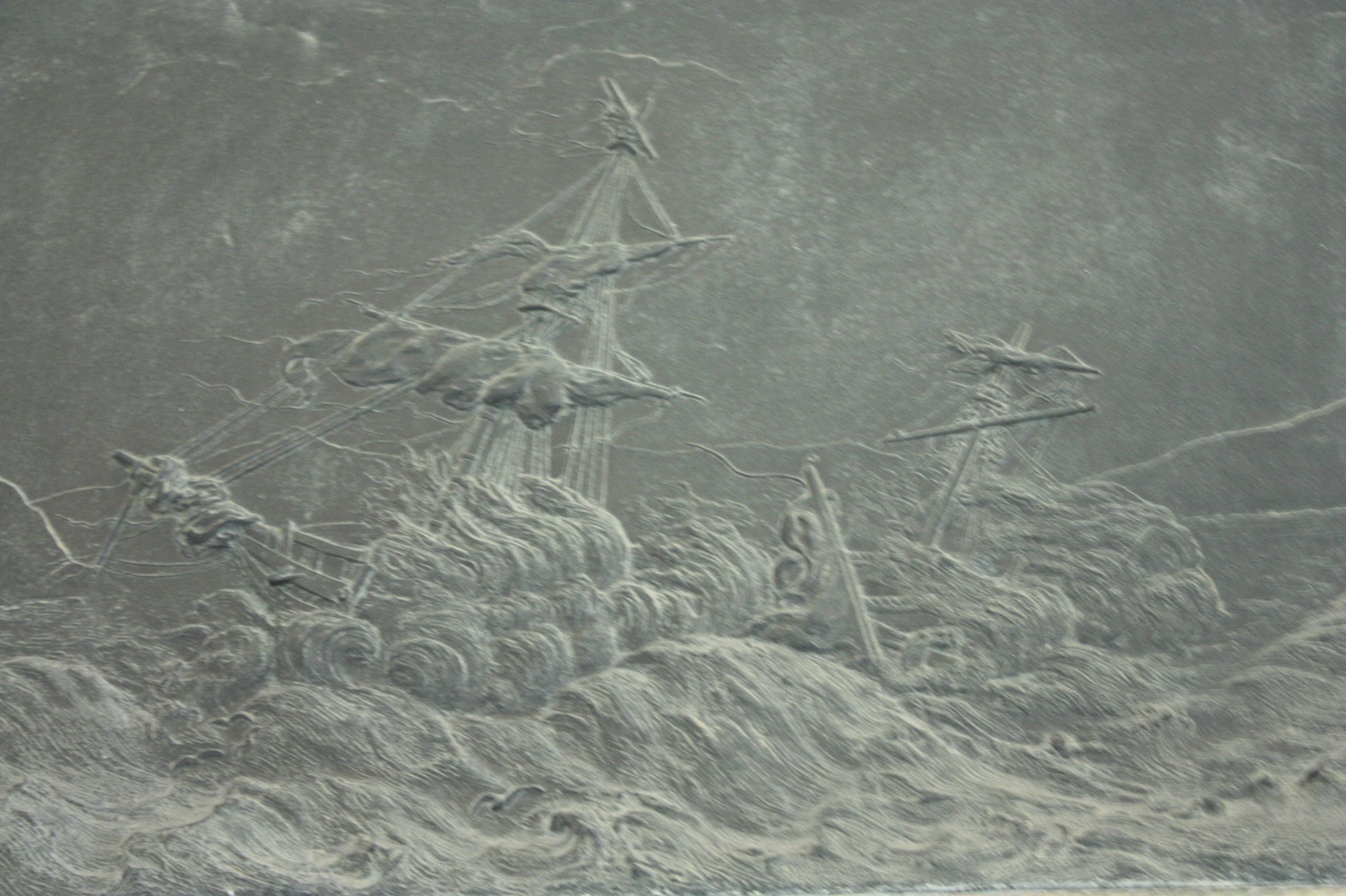
The wreck of HMS Orpheus, Orpheus Memorial, Lobby of the Chapel at the Old Naval College, Greenwich

HMS Orpheus was a Jason-class Royal Navy corvette that served as the flagship of the Australian squadron. Orpheus sank off the west coast of Auckland, New Zealand, on 7 February 1863: 189 crew out of the ship's complement of 259 died in the disaster, making it the worst maritime tragedy to occur in New Zealand waters.

== The ship ==
HMS Orpheus (named after the Greek hero) was a Jason-class corvette, a screw-driven vessel built in Chatham Dockyard in Kent, England, in 1861. She was owned by the Royal Navy and was 69 metres long with a crew of 259.

Orpheus was commanded by Captain Robert Heron Burton. She displayed a broad pennant to indicate that Commodore William Farquharson Burnett, senior officer of HM ships and vessels on the Australian and New Zealand Stations, was also on board.

She was wrecked when delivering naval supplies and troop reinforcements to Auckland for the New Zealand Wars.

== Background ==
Orpheus' first journey was in December 1861 flying the pennant of Commodore W Farquharson Burnett. She sailed from Plymouth Sound, initially for convoy duty off Canada, which delayed her voyage to Sydney. On 31 January 1863, Burnett set out on a mission to New Zealand. The mission was not to reinforce the British ships already taking part in the New Zealand Wars, but to arrange for the withdrawal of two Royal Navy sloops: Miranda, stationed in Manukau harbour, and Harrier. They were to rendezvous in the Waitematā Harbour. Orpheus was behind schedule, and Burnett decided to save some time by cutting through Manukau Harbour rather than going by the intended course of rounding North Cape and sailing down the East Coast of Northland.

== The wreck ==
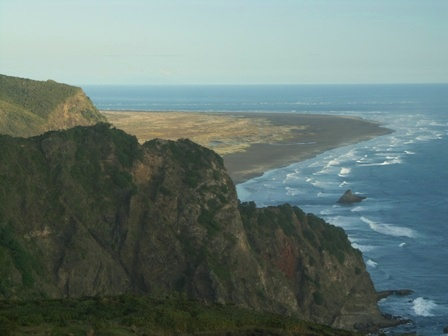
Whatipu beach: area of the wreck

Orpheus left Sydney, Australia, on 31 January 1863. Her approach to Manukau Harbour on 7 February ran near Whatipu beach, through a series of dangerous sand bars. The weather was clear and sunny. Although the bars had been charted twice, in 1836 and 1856, a revised pilotage guide from 1861 was available that indicated that the middle sand bar had moved northwards and grown considerably in the intervening time. Orpheus carried both the out-of-date chart and the updated guide, and the sailing master William Strong originally used the updated instructions for entering the harbour, but he was over-ruled by the commodore and the ship proceeded according to the 1856 chart.

As the ship approached the submerged bar, a navigational signal from nearby Paratutae Island was received instructing her to turn north to avoid a grounding. Soon after, Quartermaster Frederick Butler (a convicted deserter, and one of only two men on board to have previously entered Manukau Harbour) alerted the senior officers to the improper course they were taking. Despite finally attempting to correct their course, a few minutes later, at approximately 1:30 in the afternoon, Orpheus hit the bar in an approximate position of 37°04.1′S 174°28.3′E.

The force of the surf soon caused Orpheus to swing around, exposing its port side to the waves. Considerable damage was sustained: the hatches burst open, cabin windows were shattered, and Orpheus began to take on water. The crew attempted to abandon ship, but the power of the sea's surge made escape extremely difficult, and many sailors were swept away.

== The Wonga Wonga ==
Meanwhile, the harbour pilot and signalman of Manukau Harbour on duty was Edward Wing (son of Captain Thomas Wing, pilot and harbourmaster of the Port of Manukau who also created the original 1836 chart) who was, at that time guiding the steamship Wonga Wonga out of the harbour. When it became apparent that Orpheus was in trouble, Wonga Wonga approached the beached ship and attempted to pick up survivors, many of whom had climbed into the rigging as the deck became submerged. At approximately 8:00pm, the masts began to break, killing most of the crew who remained on board. Wonga Wonga remained in the area overnight looking for survivors, and then buried what dead could be recovered in the sand-dunes on shore. An information board located at Kakamatua Inlet on the Waitākere Ranges, near Titirangi to the west of Auckland, indicates the approximate area, now heavily overgrown, where some of the victims were buried. Later, the survivors were transferred from Wonga Wonga to HMS Avon and taken to Onehunga.

== Aftermath ==
Three inquiries were held after the shipwreck, but due to the unwillingness of the Royal Navy to admit an officer's culpability much of the blame was laid on Edward Wing for not guiding the ship into the harbour and for failing to maintain the signalling station on Paratutai Island. In all, 189 people died in the wreck of HMS Orpheus, including Commodore Burnett and Captain Burton, giving it the highest ever casualty rate for a shipwreck in New Zealand waters. (Note: The emigrant ship Cospatrick involved a greater loss of New Zealand life, but occurred in international waters)

Later, the survivors (8 officers and 62 men, including Edward Lofley) were taken to HMS Miranda and split into three groups. All the officers and 10 hands were sent to Portsmouth to appear before a court martial (in this case not a criminal trial, but a formal inquiry); 25 sailors were drafted to HMS Harrier; and the remaining 27 sailors stayed with Miranda.

Most of the sailors who drowned were very young, some being boys aged 12 to 18 who were still "learning the ropes" to become able seamen. The average age of the crew (including marines) was only 25. Many of the deceased were buried in unmarked graves, although three unknown people were buried in marked graves near Cornwallis Beach. By August 1863, £4,310 had been raised for the widows and orphans of the crewmen. Some £1,520 of the amount was raised among the colonists in Australia and New Zealand and sent to the Royal Naval College in Portsmouth for distribution to the families.

The cause of this disaster is disputed, even after the Admiralty laid the blame on Edward Wing. The local Māori interpreted it differently. In Manukau Harbour some distance from the scene of the disaster lies Puketutu Island. On the extreme western point of the island there grew a puriri tree, the tree was considered sacred and "tapu" to the Māori people. The day before Orpheus was wrecked a Pākehā settler felled the tree and used the wood for fence posts. Hence, Māori linked the disaster with a violation of tapu.

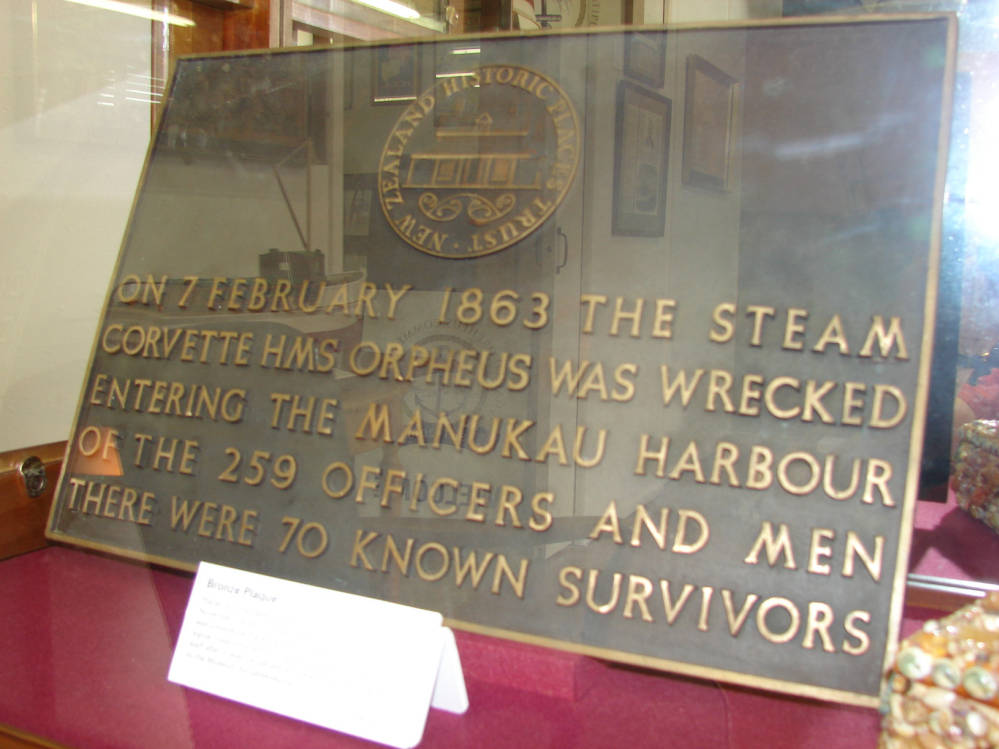
The HMS Orpheus Memorial Plaque is now located in the Huia Settlers' Museum

Orpheus Island off the coast of Queensland was named after the corvette by Lieutenant G. E. Richards in 1887 in memory of the loss of life. Memorial tablets were made and displayed in Hobart and London shortly after the disaster. On 20 November 1976, a bronze memorial plaque was placed on Paratutai Rock, near the location of the sinking, by the New Zealand Historic Places Trust. The plaque was vandalised and has since been relocated to the Huia Settlers' Museum.

A memorial service was held at Paratutai on the 150th anniversary of the sinking.

== Protection ==
The wreck of Orpheus is scheduled for preservation in the Auckland Regional Plan: Coastal and is also protected under the archaeological provisions of the Historic Places Act 1993.

== See also ==
- List of disasters in New Zealand by death toll
- Lists of shipwrecks
