= Paratutae Island =

Island in the Manukau Harbour, New Zealand

Native name: Motu Paratūtai
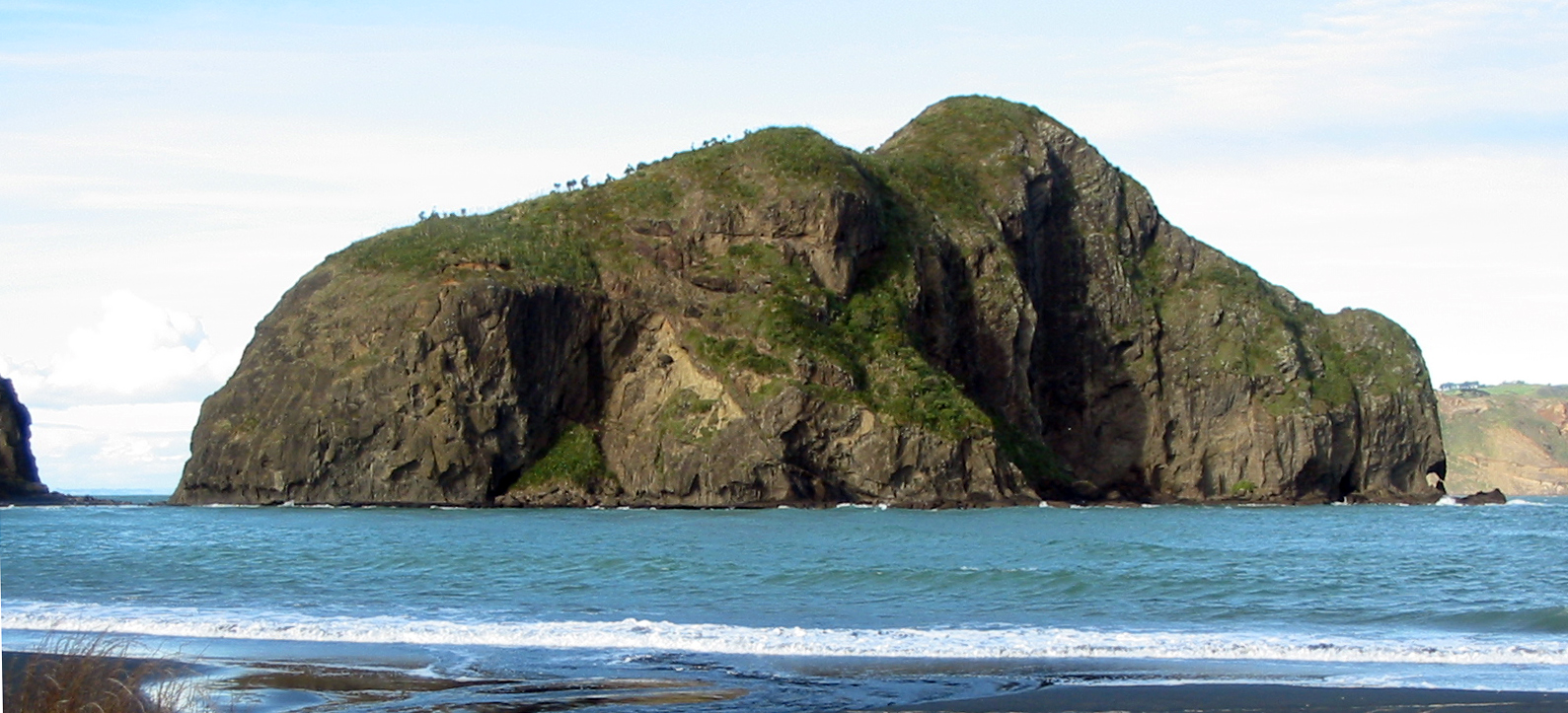
- Interactive map of Paratutae Island

Geography
- Location: Auckland
- Coordinates: 37°02′46″S 174°30′29″E
- Adjacent to: Manukau Harbour, Tasman Sea
- Highest elevation: 13 m (43 ft)

Administration
- New Zealand

Paratutae Island, also known as Paratūtai Island, is an island off New Zealand at the mouth of the Manukau Harbour, at Whatipu in the Waitākere Ranges area.

== Geology ==
The island is a portion of a Miocene era volcanic dyke swarm.

== History ==
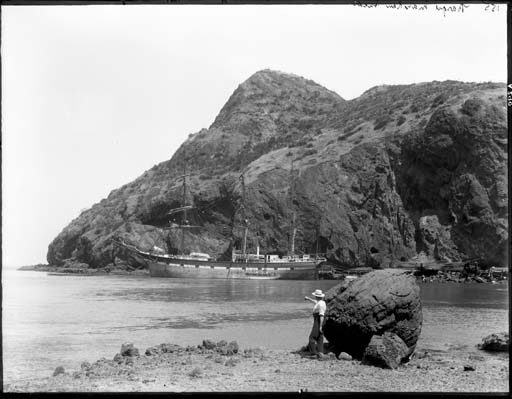
The barque 'Njord' docked at Paratutae Island in 1909

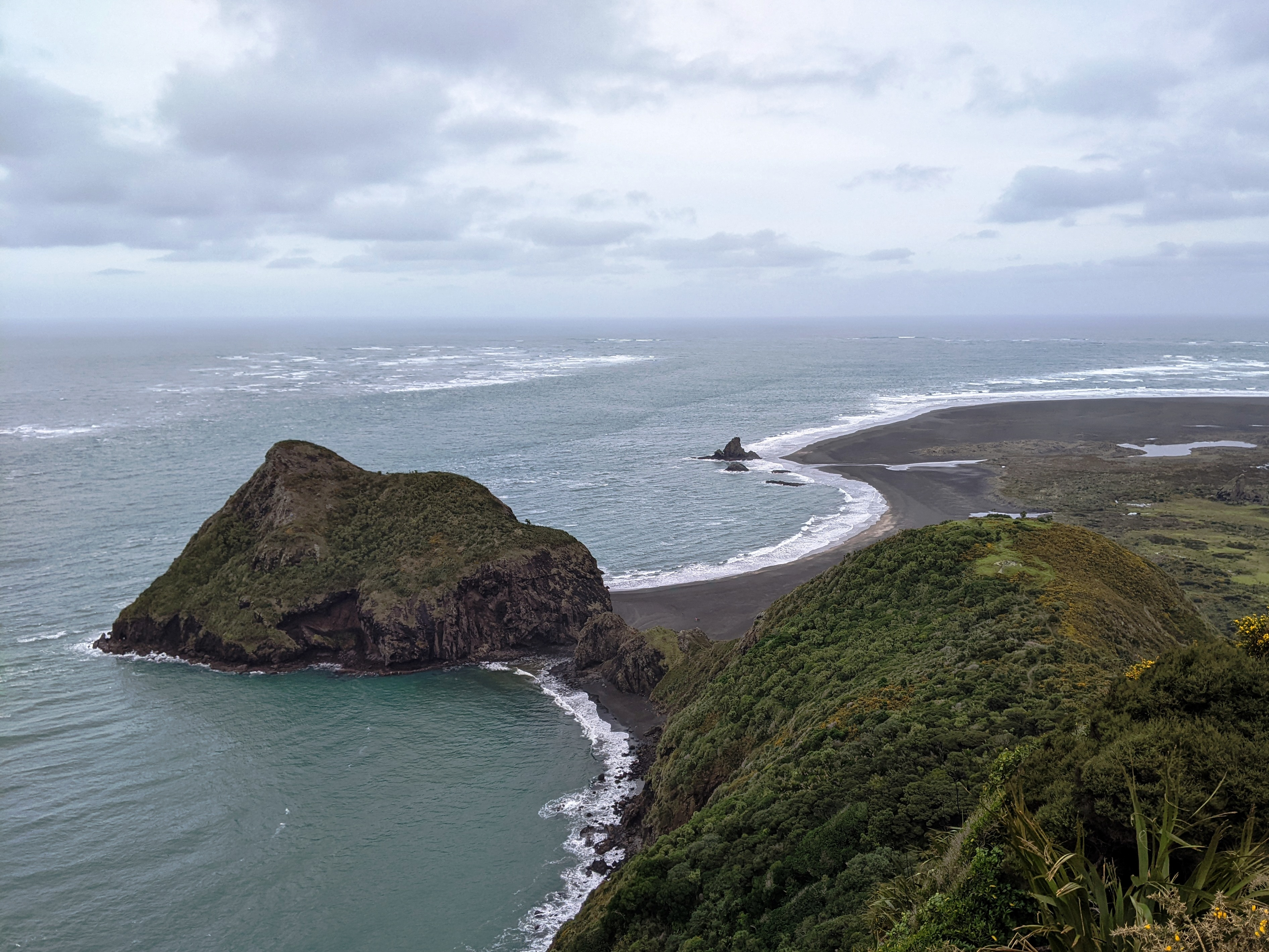
Paratutae Island on the left with Whatipu beach behind it

In Te Kawerau ā Maki oral histories, the island was visited by the Polynesian navigator Kupe. A section of the island is known by the name Te Hoe-a-Kupe ("The Paddle of Kupe"), referring to the location where Kupe struck his paddle against the island, to commemorate his visit. The island was the location of a Te Kawerau ā Maki defensive pā, guarding the entrance to the Manukau Harbour. Around the year 1700, the pā was captured by Kawharu, the famed Tainui warrior who led Ngāti Whātua warriors to take the Waitākere Ranges area. The island is one of the few locations where pre-European Māori textiles have been found, during an archaeological survey in the early 1900s.

The etymology of the island's name is contested. Many attest that the word is a corruption of Paratūtai, referring to the rise and fall of the tides at the Manukau Bar, while a separate traditional story involves a chief visiting the island and developing diarrhoea after eating too much para fern root (Ptisana salicina), The rocky sections of Whatipu, Motu Paratūtai, Te Toka Tapu ā Kupe / Ninepin Rock and Te Marotiri ō Takamiro (Cutter Rock) were collectively known as Te Kupenga ā Taramainuku, or "The Fishing Net of Taramainuku".

A signal mast was installed on the island in the 1850s, in order to improve safety for ships entering the Manukau Harbour. In November 1863 during the Invasion of the Waikato, a Waikato raiding party climbed the island and cut down the signal mast. In the latter 19th century, a wharf was constructed on the north-east side of the island. Waitākere Ranges kauri timber would transported to the Whatipu sawmill and the wharf by tramway. The wharf was used until 1921, and was demolished in 1950.

While originally an island separated from the mainland, the sandbank at Whatipu gradually accumulated during the late 20th century to form a tombolo, so that by 1989 Paratutae had become a tied island.
