= Urban areas of New Zealand =

Statistical areas in New Zealand

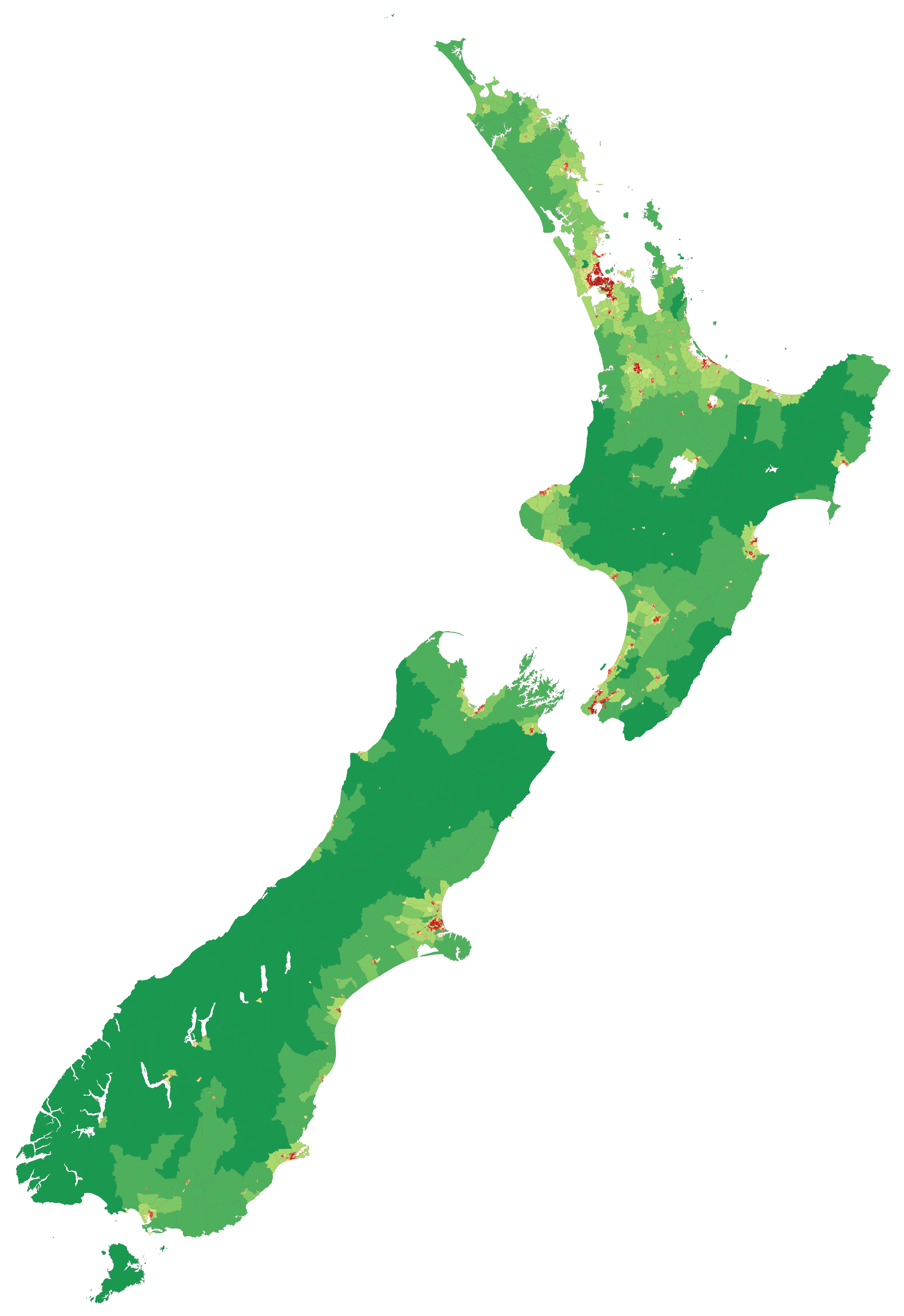
Urban areas correspond to the more densely populated areas of New Zealand: 100 people per square km and above 250 people per square km and above 500 people per square km and above 750 people per square km and above 1000 people per square km and above 2000 people per square km and above 3000 people per square km and above 4000 people per square km and above

Statistics New Zealand defines urban areas of New Zealand for statistical purposes (they have no administrative or legal basis). The urban areas comprise cities, towns and other conurbations (an aggregation of urban settlements) of a thousand people or more. In combination they constitute New Zealand's urban population, which makes up 84.5% of New Zealand's total population, as of June 2025.

The current standard for urban areas is the Statistical Standard for Geographic Areas 2023 (SSGA23), an update of SSGA18, which had replaced the New Zealand Standard Areas Classification 1992 (NZSAC92) in 2018. There are four classes of urban area under SSGA23 and SSGA18 – major, large, medium and small. Each urban area consists of one or more level-2 statistical areas (SA2s). Urban areas under SSGA18 do not cross territorial authority boundaries, with one exception (Richmond, which lies in the Tasman District but includes the Daelyn SA2 area from neighbouring Nelson City).

Under SSGA18, details of the four classes were:

- Major urban areas have a population of 100,000 or more. There are seven of them, with a combined population of 2,734,900 (51.4% of the total population).
- Large urban areas have a population of 30,000 to 99,999. There are 13 of them, with a combined population of 727,300 (13.7% of the total population).
- Medium urban areas have a population of 10,000 to 29,999. There are 23 of them, with a combined population of 482,500 (9.1% of the total population).
- Small urban areas have a population of 1,000 to 9,999. There are 152 of them, with a combined population of 556,900 (10.5% of the total population).

Statistics New Zealand also defines rural settlements with a population of 200 to 999 people or at least 40 dwellings. While these do not fit the standard international definition of an urban population, they serve to distinguish between true rural dwellers and those in rural settlements or towns. There are 402 rural settlements which combined have a population of 157,800 (3.0% of the total population).

While SSGA23 is similar to SSGA18, it added a new geographical area (SA3), upgraded Wānaka to a medium urban area, upgraded seven rural settlements to small urban areas, and created thirteen new rural settlements.

== Statistical Standard for Geographic Areas 2018 ==
The following shows the urban areas as classified under SSGA18 (adjusted according to SSGA23 update).

=== Major urban areas ===
- Auckland (1,547,200)
- Hamilton (192,100)
- Tauranga (160,900)
- Lower Hutt (113,200)
- Wellington (209,800)
- Christchurch (407,800)
- Dunedin (104,000)

=== Large urban areas ===
- Whangārei (56,100)
- Hibiscus Coast (67,800)
- Rotorua (58,500)
- Gisborne (38,100)
- Hastings (49,800)
- Napier (66,400)
- New Plymouth (60,200)
- Whanganui (42,800)
- Palmerston North (81,200)
- Porirua (60,100)
- Upper Hutt (44,500)
- Nelson (50,800)
- Invercargill (51,200)

=== Medium urban areas ===
- Pukekohe (28,800)
- Cambridge (22,700)
- Te Awamutu (13,950)
- Tokoroa (14,500)
- Taupō (27,000)
- Whakatāne (16,950)
- Havelock North (15,000)
- Feilding (17,650)
- Levin (20,500)
- Waikanae (13,600)
- Paraparaumu (29,900)
- Masterton (22,600)
- Richmond (19,950)
- Blenheim (29,800)
- Rangiora (19,300)
- Kaiapoi (13,700)
- Rolleston (34,100)
- Ashburton (21,600)
- Timaru (29,300)
- Oamaru (14,300)
- Wānaka (13,200)
- Queenstown (29,000)
- Mosgiel (15,100)

=== Small urban areas ===
- Ahipara (1,280)
- Kaitaia (6,170)
- Kerikeri (8,380)
- Kaikohe (4,720)
- Haruru (1,210)
- Paihia (1,640)
- Opua (1,250)
- Moerewa (1,930)
- Kawakawa (1,500)
- Hikurangi (1,640)
- Ngunguru (1,180)
- One Tree Point (3,350)
- Ruakākā (2,890)
- Waipu (1,450)
- Dargaville (5,170)
- Mangawhai Heads (2,760)
- Mangawhai (1,290)
- Wellsford (2,110)
- Warkworth (7,080)
- Parakai (1,090)
- Snells Beach (3,750)
- Helensville (3,540)
- Waimauku (1,400)
- Muriwai (1,110)
- Kumeū-Huapai (8,270)
- Riverhead (3,840)
- Waiheke West (8,160)
- Clarks Beach (1,660)
- Beachlands-Pine Harbour (8,330)
- Maraetai (2,660)
- Waiuku (9,860)
- Patumāhoe (1,460)
- Coromandel (1,780)
- Whitianga (6,140)
- Thames (7,230)
- Tairua (1,640)
- Pauanui (1,070)
- Whangamatā (4,230)
- Ngatea (1,600)
- Paeroa (4,600)
- Waihi (5,850)
- Tuakau (6,090)
- Pōkeno (7,380)
- Te Kauwhata (3,780)
- Huntly (8,550)
- Raglan (3,910)
- Ngāruawāhia (8,570)
- Morrinsville (9,770)
- Te Aroha (4,730)
- Matamata (9,540)
- Pirongia (1,360)
- Kihikihi (3,820)
- Ōtorohanga (3,240)
- Putāruru (4,560)
- Te Kūiti (4,850)
- Kinloch (1,270)
- Tūrangi (3,960)
- Waihi Beach-Bowentown (2,620)
- Katikati (6,030)
- Ōmokoroa (5,800)
- Te Puke (10,400)
- Maketu (1,410)
- Ngongotahā (5,280)
- Edgecumbe (1,890)
- Ōhope (3,070)
- Murupara (1,910)
- Kawerau (7,680)
- Ōpōtiki (4,900)
- Wairoa (4,720)
- Clive (2,040)
- Haumoana (1,150)
- Waipawa (2,430)
- Waipukurau (4,750)
- Ōakura (1,780)
- Waitara (7,720)
- Inglewood (3,970)
- Stratford (6,430)
- Ōpunake (1,470)
- Eltham (2,120)
- Normanby (1,080)
- Hāwera (10,700)
- Pātea (1,290)
- Taumarunui (4,940)
- Raetihi (1,140)
- Ohakune (1,360)
- Taihape (1,720)
- Marton (5,730)
- Bulls (2,110)
- Ashhurst (3,350)
- Woodville (1,680)
- Dannevirke (5,640)
- Pahiatua (2,830)
- Foxton Beach (2,190)
- Foxton (3,520)
- Shannon (1,650)
- Ōtaki Beach (2,230)
- Ōtaki (5,260)
- Paekākāriki (1,740)
- Carterton (5,930)
- Featherston (2,870)
- Greytown (2,840)
- Martinborough (1,900)
- Tākaka (1,440)
- Motueka (8,290)
- Māpua (1,680)
- Wakefield (2,730)
- Brightwater (2,330)
- Hope (840)
- Picton (4,850)
- Renwick (2,470)
- Kaikōura (2,350)
- Westport (4,600)
- Reefton (1,050)
- Runanga (1,200)
- Greymouth (8,610)
- Hokitika (3,420)
- Hanmer Springs (1,090)
- Amberley (2,870)
- Oxford (2,250)
- Waikuku Beach (1,090)
- Woodend (5,470)
- Pegasus (4,260)
- Lyttelton (3,220)
- Diamond Harbour (1,610)
- Darfield (3,590)
- West Melton (2,700)
- Burnham Camp (900)
- Prebbleton (5,750)
- Leeston (2,470)
- Lincoln (12,100)
- Methven (2,170)
- Rakaia (1,680)
- Geraldine (3,070)
- Pleasant Point (1,470)
- Temuka (4,760)
- Twizel (1,790)
- Waimate (3,610)
- Cromwell (7,470)
- Clyde (1,200)
- Alexandra (5,860)
- Lake Hāwea (2,500)
- Arrowtown (2,860)
- Waikouaiti (1,310)
- Brighton (1,470)
- Balclutha (4,460)
- Milton (2,120)
- Te Anau (2,920)
- Winton (2,560)
- Riverton / Aparima (1,700)
- Gore (8,310)
- Mataura (1,670)
- Bluff (1,840)

=== Rural settlements ===
==== North Island ====
- Pukenui (810)
- Kaimaumau (200)
- Tokerau Beach (330)
- Karikari (740)
- Awanui (420)
- Taipā (160)
- Cable Bay (1,190)
- Coopers Beach (670)
- Hihi (240)
- Mangōnui (670)
- Whangaroa (140)
- Kaeo (260)
- Kohukohu (180)
- Rawene (470)
- Opononi (270)
- Ōmāpere (450)
- Ōkaihau (380)
- Waipapa (150)
- Rangitane (360)
- Kerikeri Inlet (460)
- Ōhaeawai (450)
- Ngawha Springs (210)
- Waitangi, Northland (60)
- Russell (820)
- Okiato (200)
- Oakura-Whangaruru South (180)
- Maungatapere (330)
- Matapouri (210)
- Tutukaka (830)
- Pataua (180)
- Parua Bay (640)
- Whangārei Heads (940)
- Waipu Cove-Langs Beach (340)
- Baylys Beach (390)
- Te Kōpuru (550)
- Ruawai (480)
- Paparoa (430)
- Pahi (290)
- Maungaturoto (950)
- Kaiwaka (820)
- Port Albert (120)
- Te Hana (130)
- Kaipara Flats (160)
- Shelly Beach (290)
- Matakana (650)
- Whangateau (140)
- Point Wells (650)
- Leigh (610)
- Ti Point (150)
- Rainbows End (90)
- Ōmaha (740)
- Sandspit (510)
- Baddeleys Beach-Campbells Beach (90)
- Kaukapakapa (1,140)
- Puhoi (400)
- Scotts Landing-Mahurangi East (210)
- Algies Bay (720)
- Mahurangi West (120)
- Waiwera (240)
- Kawau Island (100)
- Stillwater (940)
- Te Henga / Bethells Beach (260)
- Ōkura (380)
- Pāremoremo (510)
- Piha (1,030)
- Karekare (300)
- Huia (670)
- Parau (500)
- Medlands Beach (100)
- Tryphena (200)
- Big Bay-Grahams Beach (120)
- Matakawau Point (120)
- Ōmiha (550)
- Glenbrook Beach (1,050)
- Waiau Pa (510)
- Kingseat (500)
- Clevedon, New Zealand (840)
- Paerata (1,380)
- Kawakawa Bay (610)
- Ōrere Point (390)
- Bombay (520)
- Whangapoua (100)
- Matarangi (710)
- Rings Beach (140)
- Kūaotunu (250)
- Tapu (290)
- Cooks Beach-Ferry Landing (580)
- Waiomu (350)
- Te Puru (490)
- Thornton Bay-Ngarimu Bay (280)
- Hahei (320)
- Puriri (250)
- Onemana (200)
- Kaiaua (510)
- Turua (400)
- Kerepehi (590)
- Karangahake (390)
- Whiritoa (280)
- Waikino (320)
- Port Waikato (590)
- Meremere (610)
- Taupiri (720)
- Horotiu (810)
- Te Kowhai (700)
- Whatawhata (300)
- Waitoa (300)
- Waihou (340)
- Waharoa (710)
- Ngāhinapōuri (350)
- Rukuhia (160)
- Ōhaupō (790)
- Karapiro Village (320)
- Kawhia (370)
- Tīrau (950)
- Arapuni (330)
- Taharoa (170)
- Mōkau (110)
- Piopio (460)
- Maniaiti/Benneydale (250)
- Mangakino (860)
- Whakamaru (200)
- Ātiamuri (80)
- Kuratau (110)
- Wairakei Village (490)
- Ōmori (150)
- Motuoapa (520)
- Oruatua-Te Rangiita-Waitetoko (190)
- Five Mile Bay-Waitahanui (600)
- Athenree (900)
- Tanners Point (210)
- Ongare Point-Kauri Point (290)
- Fairview (410)
- Plummers Point (190)
- Te Puna West (300)
- Paengaroa (940)
- Pukehina Beach (940)
- Mamaku (830)
- Hamurana (1,180)
- Okere Falls (370)
- Mourea (430)
- Tikitere (660)
- Rotoiti (520)
- Lake Ōkareka (480)
- Lake Tarawera (240)
- Rotoma (260)
- Kaingaroa (420)
- Matatā (720)
- Te Teko (420)
- Tāneatua (940)
- Ōhiwa (180)
- Te Kaha (390)
- Hicks Bay (190)
- Te Araroa (150)
- Ruatoria (910)
- Te Karaka (600)
- Tokomaru Bay (490)
- Pātūtahi (350)
- Manutūkē (460)
- Tolaga Bay (980)
- Tuai (230)
- Frasertown (250)
- Nūhaka (220)
- Mahia Beach (250)
- Whirinaki (440)
- Whakatu (680)
- Te Awanga (690)
- Waimārama (210)
- Tikokino (240)
- Ongaonga (150)
- Takapau (690)
- Ōtāne (780)
- Pōrangahau (150)
- Ōkato (720)
- Lepperton (410)
- Egmont Village (350)
- Onaero Beach (70)
- Urenui (460)
- Midhirst (280)
- Kaponga (360)
- Manaia (1,120)
- Ohawe (240)
- Waverley (820)
- Waitōtara (70)
- Waiinu Beach (90)
- Ōhura (160)
- Ōwhango (200)
- Raurimu (90)
- National Park (270)
- Rangataua (190)
- Waiouru (850)
- Kai Iwi (200)
- Rātana Pā (370)
- Koitiata (140)
- Hunterville (390)
- Mangaweka (110)
- Tangimoana (380)
- Ohakea (170)
- Halcombe (670)
- Sanson (680)
- Himatangi Beach (590)
- Rongotea (690)
- Kimbolton (240)
- Pohangina (230)
- Hiwinui (410)
- Bunnythorpe (740)
- Longburn (330)
- Norsewood (150)
- Ormondville (90)
- Eketāhuna (580)
- Pongaroa (90)
- Waitarere Beach (1,020)
- Hokio Beach (220)
- Waikawa Beach (190)
- Ōhau (810)
- Tokomaru (620)
- Manakau (490)
- Mangaore (90)
- Te Horo Beach (390)
- Castlepoint (60)
- Matauri Bay (310)
- Maungakaramea (310)
- Buckleton Beach (20)
- Okupu (120)
- Weiti Village (100)
- Waitakere Village (810)
- Orua Bay (30)
- Orapiu (70)
- Whitford (170)
- Hunua (190)
- Tahuna (140)
- Marokopa (40)
- Pukawa (60)
- Whareroa Village (50)
- Hatepe (40)
- Minginui (180)
- Waiotahe (260)
- Omahu (290)
- Waiohiki (310)
- Riversdale Beach (180)

==== South Island ====
- Collingwood (310)
- Parapara (100)
- Ligar Bay (150)
- Pōhara (630)
- Mārahau (260)
- Kaiteretere (490)
- Riwaka (740)
- Tasman (700)
- Tapawera (350)
- Ruby Bay (810)
- Murchison (540)
- St Arnaud (130)
- Ōkiwi Bay (80)
- Rai Valley (170)
- Havelock (640)
- Anakiwa (170)
- Wairau Valley (240)
- Ngākuta Bay (70)
- Tuamarina (240)
- Woodbourne (520)
- Spring Creek (540)
- Marlborough Ridge (340)
- Rārangi (680)
- Grovetown (390)
- Seddon (570)
- Ward (80)
- Karamea (460)
- Carters Beach (340)
- Ngakawau (220)
- Granity (190)
- Waimangaroa (210)
- Blackball (310)
- Dobson (610)
- Ahaura (120)
- Moana (110)
- Gloriavale (480)
- Haast (100)
- Kaniere (570)
- Ross (330)
- Kumara (320)
- Fox Glacier (220)
- Franz Josef (440)
- Harihari (250)
- Rotherham (150)
- Culverden (360)
- Hawarden (240)
- Waiau (270)
- Waikari (290)
- Waipara (340)
- Leithfield (650)
- Amberley Beach (170)
- Cheviot (410)
- Leithfield Beach (410)
- Cust (250)
- Ashley (410)
- Sefton (270)
- Waikuku (160)
- Woodend Beach (230)
- The Pines Beach (330)
- Spencerville (600)
- Governors Bay (900)
- Birdlings Flat (240)
- Little River (300)
- Duvauchelle (210)
- Takamatua (110)
- Akaroa (640)
- Arthur's Pass (30)
- Castle Hill (80)
- Springfield (330)
- Malvern Hills-Whitecliffs (220)
- Sheffield and Waddington (350)
- Glentunnel (170)
- Coalgate (390)
- Hororata (230)
- Kirwee (1,200)
- Dunsandel (490)
- Springston (540)
- Doyleston (360)
- Southbridge (1,090)
- Selwyn Huts (90)
- Tai Tapu (630)
- Mount Somers (250)
- Hinds (350)
- Lake Hood (520)
- Woodbury (120)
- Cave (100)
- Orari (200)
- Winchester (260)
- Waipopo (70)
- Milford Huts (60)
- Pareora (480)
- Mount Cook Village (160)
- Tekapo (620)
- Fairlie (970)
- St Andrews (190)
- Makikihi (90)
- Glenavy (270)
- Omarama (370)
- Otematata (190)
- Kurow (360)
- Duntroon (100)
- Maheno (120)
- Herbert (110)
- Kakanui (440)
- Hampden (410)
- Moeraki (160)
- Palmerston (1,080)
- Pisa Moorings (980)
- Bannockburn (580)
- Omakau (410)
- Lake Roxburgh Village (90)
- Roxburgh (640)
- Naseby (140)
- Ranfurly (770)
- Ettrick (170)
- Millers Flat (90)
- Glenorchy (360)
- Millbrook (170)
- Hāwea Flat (600)
- Luggate (680)
- Kingston (420)
- Middlemarch (150)
- Outram (960)
- Karitane (430)
- Allanton (370)
- Warrington (560)
- Waitati-Doctors Point (590)
- Pūrākaunui (210)
- Aramoana (130)
- Harwood (240)
- Ōtākou-Harington Point (190)
- Tapanui (800)
- Lawrence (510)
- Clinton (280)
- Waihola (550)
- Benhar (100)
- Stirling (320)
- Kaitangata (860)
- Taieri Mouth (350)
- Owaka (340)
- Kaka Point (230)
- Pounawea (120)
- Manapouri (270)
- Mossburn (180)
- Ohai (290)
- Tuatapere (560)
- Nightcaps (310)
- Lumsden (530)
- Otautau (800)
- Balfour (140)
- Waikaia (110)
- Riversdale (490)
- Wallacetown (750)
- Woodlands (350)
- Edendale (640)
- Wyndham (620)
- Kennington (120)
- Gore Bay (10)
- Motunau Beach (30)
- Fernside (250)
- Kainga (480)

==== Offshore islands ====
- Oban, Stewart Island (320)
- Waitangi, Chatham Islands (210)

== New Zealand Standard Areas Classification 1992 ==
Under the New Zealand Standard Areas Classification 1992 (NZSAC92), there are three classes of urban area:

- Main urban areas, with a population of 30,000 or more. These 17 areas mostly correspond to the places known by New Zealanders as cities.
- Secondary urban areas are the 14 urban areas with a population of 10,000 to 29,999.
- Minor urban areas make up the remainder of the urban population of the country, towns with 1,000 to 9,999 people. There are 103 minor urban areas.

=== Main urban areas ===
The population figures shown are Statistics New Zealand's resident population estimates at June 2018. For rankings in various criteria see the ranked list of New Zealand urban areas by population. Four main urban areas are subdivided into urban zones. The following cities are listed by location from north to south.

==== North Island ====
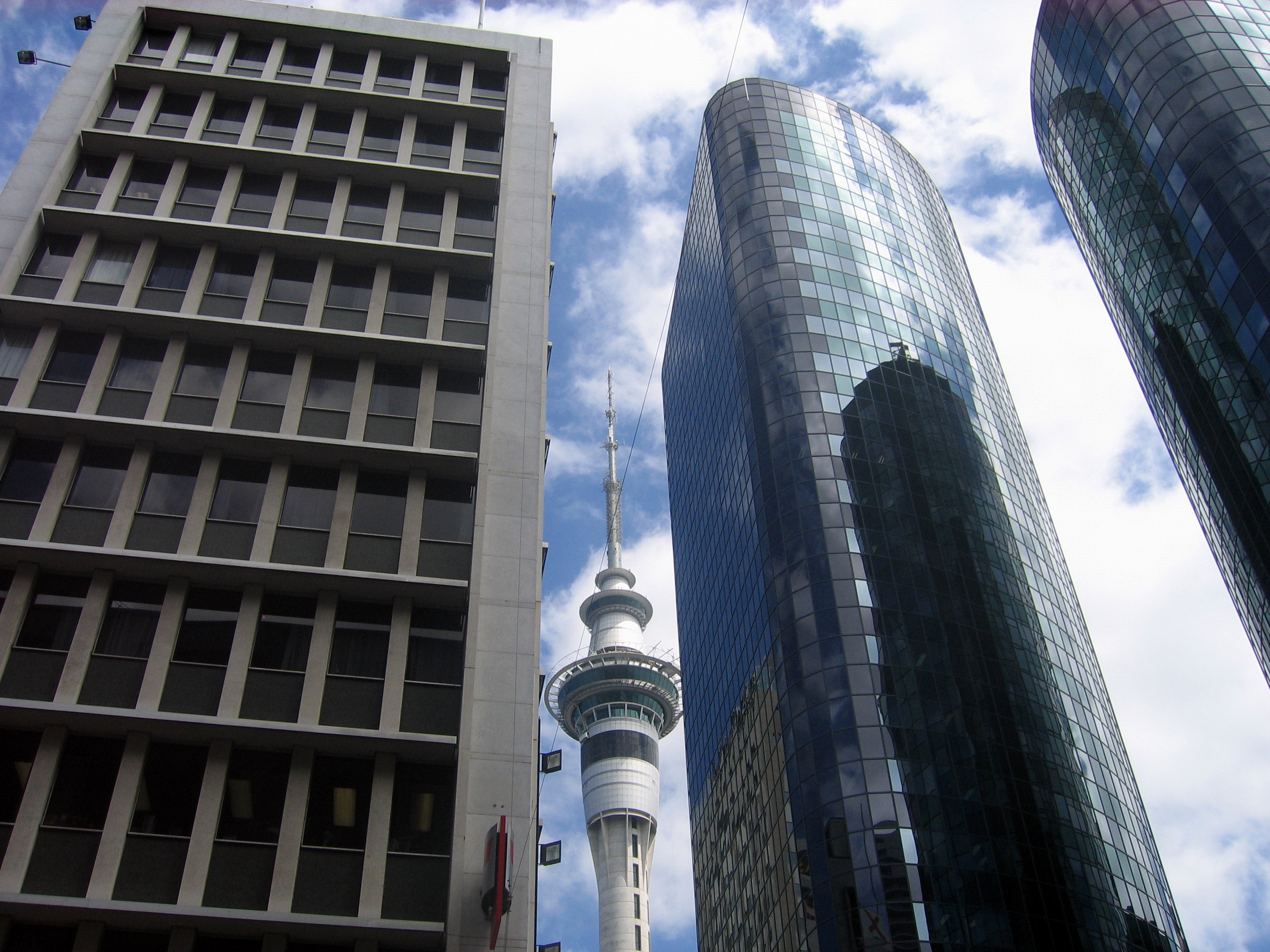
Skyscrapers in Auckland's central business district

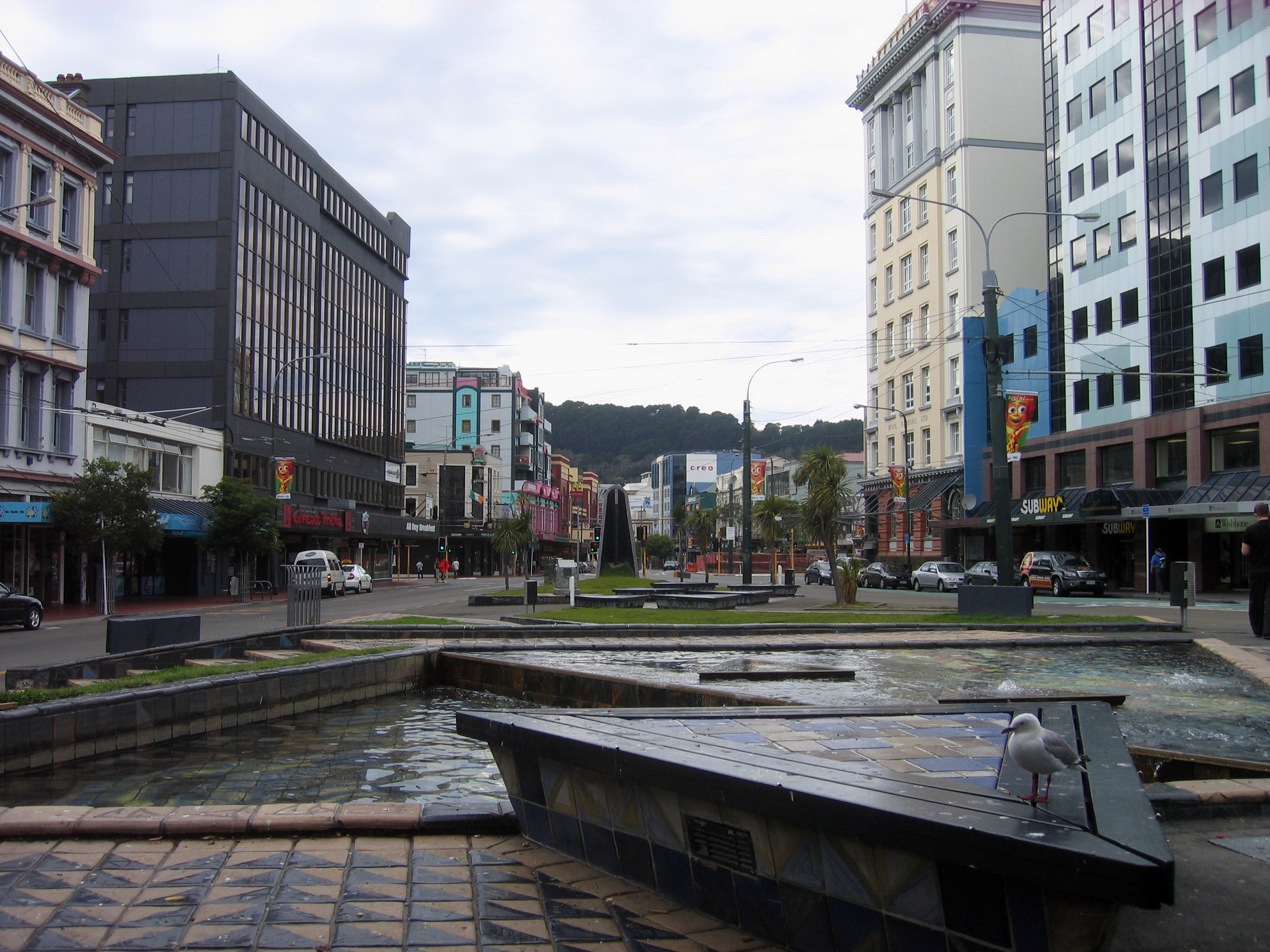
Wellington city centre

- Whangārei (58,700): from Hikurangi to Portland.
- Auckland (1,570,100) is divided into four urban zones:
  - Northern Auckland Urban Zone (323,500):
    - the part of Rodney District known as the Hibiscus Coast, from Waiwera south, including Orewa and the Whangaparaoa Peninsula
    - all of North Shore City
  - Western Auckland Urban Zone (242,300):
    - the part of Rodney District around Kumeū
    - the urban part of West Auckland
  - Central Auckland Urban Zone (525,900): Auckland isthmus, including the Auckland CBD and inner suburbs
  - Southern Auckland Urban Zone (478,400):
    - the urban part of Manukau City
    - Papakura District
    - Whangapouri Creek and Runciman in Franklin District
- Hamilton (241,200) is divided into three urban zones:
  - Hamilton Urban Zone (203,100): all of Hamilton City and neighbouring parts of Waikato and Waipa districts including Ngāruawāhia, Taupiri and Ōhaupō
  - Cambridge Urban Zone (20,600): includes Leamington
  - Te Awamutu Urban Zone (17,500): includes Kihikihi
- Tauranga (141,600): Omokoroa to Papamoa Beach; and Mount Maunganui to Tauriko and Pyes Pa
- Rotorua (59,500): Ngongotahā to Owhata
- Gisborne (37,200): Makaraka to Okitu
- Napier-Hastings (134,500) is a conurbation of two urban zones:
  - Napier (63,900): Includes Napier City, Taradale, Eskdale, Waiohiki, Meeanee and Bay View. From Bay View to Awatoto
  - Hastings (70,600): From Havelock North to Flaxmere, includes Te Awanga, Haumoana, Pakowhai and Pakipaki
- New Plymouth (58,300): Oakura to Bell Block
- Wanganui (40,900): Westmere to Marybank
- Palmerston North (86,600): Including Longburn, Kairanga and Stony Creek, but excluding Ashhurst and rural areas in the Tararua foothills
- Kāpiti (42,700): Pekapeka to Paekākāriki
- Wellington (418,500) is divided into four urban zones:
  - Upper Hutt (41,200): Te Marua to Pinehaven
  - Lower Hutt (105,200): includes Wainuiomata, Petone and the eastern bays, excludes farmland adjacent to Wainuiomata
  - Porirua (56,700): all of Porirua City except Paekākāriki Hill and Mana Island; includes Pukerua Bay and Pauatahanui
  - Wellington City (215,400): from Linden south, includes Horokiwi but excludes Mākara and Ohariu

==== South Island ====
- Nelson (67,500): from Glenduan to the Wairoa River, includes Richmond but excludes Whangamoa
- Blenheim (31,600): From Renwick to Riverlands and south to Wither Hills
- Christchurch (404,500): Christchurch City, Kaiapoi, and up to the Waimakariri River, Prebbleton, Tai Tapu and Lyttelton Harbour including Diamond Harbour
- Dunedin (122,000): from Mosgiel and Brighton to Pine Hill, Ravensbourne to Aramoana
- Invercargill (51,200): Makarewa to Woodend and west to Otatara

=== Secondary urban areas ===
The population figures shown are Statistics New Zealand's resident population estimates at the June 2018. The following towns are listed by location from north to south.

==== North Island ====
- Pukekohe (31,400): From Paerata to Tuakau. Excludes Bombay.
- Whakatāne (19,750): From Coastlands to Ōhope and south to Poroporo.
- Tokoroa (14,050): From Tokoroa to Kinleith.
- Taupō (24,700): From Wairakei to Taupō Airport.
- Hāwera (12,150): From Normanby to Mokoia.
- Feilding (16,850): From Halcombe to Aorangi.
- Levin (21,200): From Waitarere Beach to Ohau.
- Masterton (22,200): From Opaki to Waingawa.

==== South Island ====
- Greymouth (9,700): From Runanga to Southbeach and Camerons.
- Rangiora (18,300): From the Ashley River to Flaxton
- Ashburton (20,200): From Fairton to Winslow and Argyle Park.
- Timaru (29,100): From Washdyke to Scarborough and west to Gleniti.
- Queenstown (15,850): From Fernhill and Kelvin Heights to Frankton
- Oamaru (13,950): From Pukeuri to Weston and Holmes Hill.

=== Minor urban areas ===
==== North Island ====
- Taipā Bay–Mangōnui (2,050)
- Kaitaia (5,860)
- Kerikeri (7,520)
- Paihia (2,010)
- Kawakawa (1,520)
- Moerewa (1,680)
- Kaikohe (4,560)
- Dargaville (5,180)
- Ngunguru (1,810)
- Mangawhai Heads (1,530)
- Wellsford (2,100)
- Warkworth (4,890)
- Snells Beach (5,040)
- Helensville (3,150)
- Waiheke Island (9,770)
- Waiuku (9,780)
- Coromandel (1,750)
- Whitianga (5,080)
- Tairua (1,430)
- Thames (7,350)
- Whangamatā (3,960)
- Ngatea (1,420)
- Paeroa (4,410)
- Waihi (5,150)
- Te Kauwhata (1,820)
- Huntly (8,150)
- Raglan (3,310)
- Ōtorohanga (2,750)
- Te Kūiti (4,640)
- Te Aroha (4,350)
- Morrinsville (7,870)
- Matamata (7,920)
- Putāruru (4,100)
- Tūrangi (3,320)
- Waihi Beach (2,220)
- Katikati Community (4,710)
- Te Puke Community (8,350)
- Edgecumbe (1,780)
- Kawerau (7,080)
- Murupara (1,780)
- Ōpōtiki (4,320)
- Wairoa (4,290)
- Waipawa (2,160)
- Waipukurau (4,220)
- Waitara (7,040)
- Inglewood (3,630)
- Stratford (5,740)
- Eltham (2,070)
- Ōpunake (1,360)
- Pātea (1,160)
- Taumarunui (4,720)
- Ohakune (1,160)
- Raetihi (1,140)
- Waiouru (930)
- Taihape (1,730)
- Marton (4,950)
- Bulls (1,770)
- Dannevirke (5,360)
- Woodville (1,500)
- Pahiatua (2,570)
- Foxton Community (4,720)
- Shannon (1,390)
- Ōtaki (6,410)
- Carterton (5,320)
- Greytown (2,380)
- Featherston (2,480)
- Martinborough (1,680)

==== South Island ====
- Tākaka (1,330)
- Motueka (8,450)
- Māpua (2,270)
- Brightwater (2,040)
- Wakefield (2,360)
- Picton (4,350)
- Westport (3,960)
- Reefton (990)
- Hokitika (3,590)
- Kaikōura (2,150)
- Amberley (1,790)
- Oxford (2,170)
- Woodend (3,110)
- Darfield (2,230)
- Rolleston (16,250)
- Lincoln (6,100)
- Leeston (1,870)
- Methven (1,880)
- Rakaia (1,240)
- Geraldine (2,500)
- Temuka (4,370)
- Pleasant Point (1,390)
- Twizel Community (1,280)
- Waimate (2,890)
- Wānaka (8,890)
- Arrowtown (2,950)
- Cromwell (5,160)
- Alexandra (5,510)
- Waikouaiti (1,170)
- Milton (1,950)
- Balclutha (3,990)
- Te Anau (2,140)
- Gore (9,910)
- Winton (2,370)
- Riverton / Aparima (1,490)
- Bluff (1,870)

=== Changes to classification ===
1992

Original classification

1996

No change

2001

- Kapiti promoted from secondary to main urban area
- Rolleston added as minor urban area
- Pauanui Beach dropped to rural centre

2006

- Edgecumbe Community renamed Edgecumbe

2013

- Blenheim promoted from secondary to main urban area
- Rangiora and Queenstown promoted from minor to secondary urban areas
- Gore demoted from secondary to minor urban area
- Ngunguru, Mangawhai Heads, Te Kauwhata, Ngatea, Mapua, Amberley, Methven, Rakaia and Waikouaiti added as minor urban areas
- Russell, Mangakino, Manaia and Hanmer Springs dropped to rural centres

== Related lists ==
- Cities in New Zealand
- List of functional urban areas in New Zealand – Stats NZ has defined 53 functional urban areas
- List of populated places in New Zealand – includes a simplified ranked list
