= May 2025 New Zealand storm =

Severe weather affected many areas of New Zealand from 30 April to 2 May. By 30 April, MetService had issued multiple severe weather warnings for parts of South and North Islands, with forecasts of heavy rain, damaging winds and high seas. The Canterbury Region experienced heavy rainfall and flooding, leading to states of emergency being declared in the Selwyn District, Christchurch and Banks Peninsula on 1 May. The Wellington Region also experienced strong winds, large tides and wet weather that same day. 8,000 properties in Wellington lost power. In response to strong wind gusts that reached 150 km/h (93 mph), most flights to and from Wellington International Airport as well as all Cook Strait ferry crossings were cancelled.

While the state of emergency in the Selwyn District was lifted on 2 May, Banks Peninsula remained under a state of emergency until 12 May due to a landslip in Akaroa.

== Meteorology ==
An area of low pressure developed in the Tasman Sea to the west of New Zealand and deepened, moving slowly eastwards and gathering moisture from the warm ocean. The centre of the low pressure area moved across the North Island creating very strong winds, particularly through Cook Strait between the South and North Islands. The winds were from a south-easterly to southerly direction and strengthened as they passed through the strait, creating waves of up to 12 m (39 ft) height off Baring Head. Wellington recorded gusts exceeding 140 km/h (90 mph). The weather system bought heavy rain in some areas, leading to flooding, particularly in the South Island. In some eastern areas, more than 100 mm (3.9 in) of rain fell in less than 12 hours. A local state of emergency was declared in Christchurch. Snow warnings were issued for mountain areas, and some areas received 50 cm (20 in) of snowfall in 24 hours. By the midday of 2 May, over 160 lightning strikes were recorded in the Auckland Region for that day.

== Wellington ==
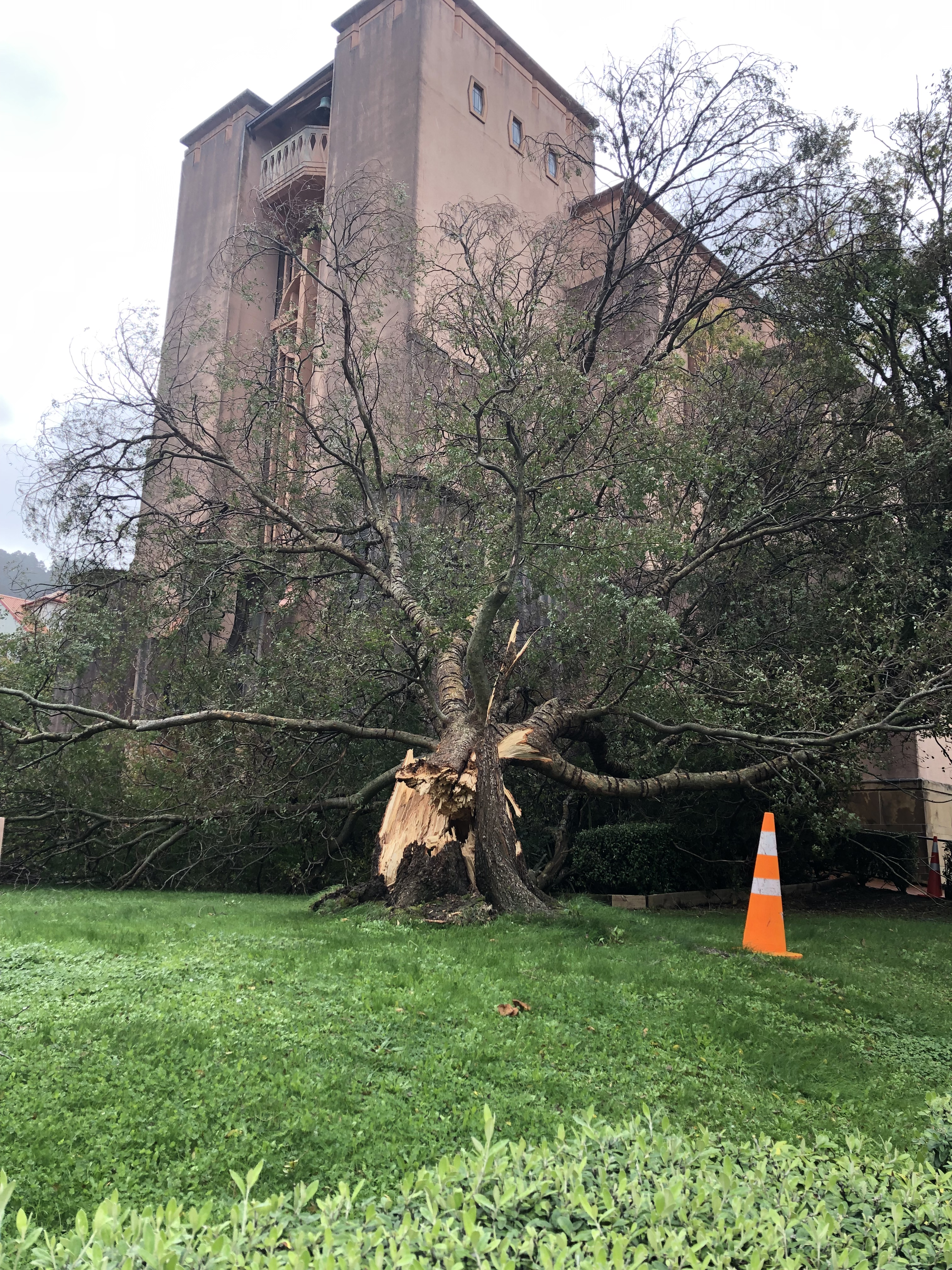
Ash tree in grounds of Wellington Cathedral, toppled in 1 May storm

On 30 April MetService issued heavy swell warnings for the Wellington and Wairarapa coasts, forecasting waves of up to 6 metres (20 ft). On 1 May MetService announced a 'red' weather warning, the highest level wind warning, indicative of the possibility of widespread damage and the threat to life. This was the first time that a red warning had been given since the category was created in 2019. With this warning in place, the service encouraged residents to stay indoors and avoid unnecessary travel. After wind gusts surpassing 150 km/h (93 mph) occurred at Mount Kaukau, MetService's weather station there stopped working. Rainfall in Wellington between Wednesday and Friday morning was 120–150 mm (4.7–5.9 in).

Wellington City Council recommended that residents on Wellington's south coast, including Ōwhiro Bay should consider staying elsewhere overnight because of the extreme winds, large waves and high tide occurring during the evening. The council closed all its public facilities during the afternoon, including pools, recreation centres, libraries and sports fields. The red wind warning for the Wellington Region was downgraded to an orange warning on Thursday evening at 8:45pm.

On 1 May, most flights to and from Wellington Airport were cancelled, about 200, affecting about 22,000 people. Of those cancellations, 157 were by Air New Zealand. The airline rebooked international customers and allowed domestic customers to rebook on their own using Air New Zealand's app. Flights came back to the airport the next day, but two flights were diverted that day due to strong winds. Cook Strait ferry crossing were also cancelled by Interislander and Bluebridge on Thursday and Friday. Ferry sailings resumed on Saturday 3 May. On 1 May several bus and train and services were cancelled, including on the Wairarapa and Hutt Valley Lines. That day several schools in Wellington and Victoria University closed.

The wind caused roofing to fly off homes in Petone, Wellington CBD and Brooklyn, a suburb of the city. The winds also caused trees to fall on power lines. Surface flooding occurred in Lower Hutt or Upper Hutt and there was a slip on Wainuiomata Hill. There was extensive damage to the Wellington electricity network, leading to 8,000 outages. Power outages also occurred in the Wellington Region, including the Wairarapa, Lower Hutt, Upper Hutt, Judgeford and the Kāpiti Coast. Power outages also occurred in Horowhenua. By 5 May, there were still 300 homes without power in Wellington, and Wellington Electricity was criticised for inadequate communications about the restoration work. Power outages occurred in Wellington, Manawatū and the Wairarapa. As of 7 May, a small number of houses in Wellington were still without power.

A large ash tree in the grounds of the Wellington Cathedral of St Paul was blown over. The wood from the tree would be used to make stays for the church bells. Six injured and exhausted albatross were rescued during the storm and transferred to Wellington Zoo. Two of them were euthanised. A few empty shipping containers at CentrePort Wellington fell over. On 2 May a red panda escaped from Wellington Zoo after a tree fell over, but it was found a short distance away and brought back to the zoo.

== Canterbury ==
On 1 May a state of emergency was issued in Selwyn District, and later on the same day states of emergency were issued in Christchurch and Banks Peninsula. Mayor of Christchurch Phil Mauger described the decision to declare a state of emergency in Christchurch as a precautionary measure to keep people informed and to assist emergency services. MetService also issued heavy rain warnings and watches for parts of Canterbury including Christchurch and the Banks Peninsula. According to The Press, Christchurch experienced 80.2 mm of rain in the 24-hour period between 9 am on 30 April and 9 am on 1 May, making this the wettest day in April since 1943 when MetService records began. Meanwhile, meteorologist Mmathapelo Makgabutlane reported that Banks Peninsula experienced 300 mm of rain between 12 am on 30 April and 7 am on 2 May. During that 48-hour period, Lincoln in the Selwyn District recorded 131 mm of rain while Christchurch had 116 mm. By nightfall on 1 May, Radio New Zealand reported that the Banks Peninsula town of Akaroa had received over 200 mm of rainfall in the previous 48 hours.

That same day, Mayor of Selwyn Sam Broughton reported there was significant flooding in the Selwyn District and urged Upper Selywn Huts residents to evacuate due to the Selwyn River bursting its banks. The Selwyn District Council had closed the Coes Ford and several other fords on 30 April due to flooding. The Selwyn Council also distributed sandbags to residents in West Melton, Doyleston, Leeston, Sheffield and Glentunnel. By the evening of 1 May, heavy rainfall had filled Christchurch's stormwater basins, increasing the flood risk for properties near the Ōpāwaho / Heathcote River. Flooding also cut road access to parts of the Banks Peninsula including Akaroa and Little River. A landslide in Akaroa's Lighthouse Road prompted local residents to evacuate.

On 1 May, several schools across mid-Canterbury, particularly in the Selwyn District, were closed due to flooding and adverse weather conditions. In the Ashburton District, several roads near Methven were closed due to flooding from the nearby Dry Creek. The Ashburton District Council and NZ Transport Agency Waka Kotahi dispatched personnel to monitor the state of the road network in the district. The Transport Agency dispatched five crews to deal with potholes along the South Canterbury – Mid Canterbury network. By 7:30 pm on 1 May, Fire and Emergency New Zealand had received 61 calls for help across Canterbury, including a woman and two children trapped in their vehicle on a bridge surrounded by floodwaters at 11:35 am.

The state of emergency in Selwyn was lifted on 2 May. That day, the Christchurch City Council (CCC) announced that all grass sports grounds would be closed for the weekend. According to Stuff, Banks Peninsula received about 300mm of rain during a two-day rain deluge, resulting in landslips, cracks in roads and severe flooding. Flooding was reported in Doyleston, State Highway 75 through Little River, Springston, Beckenham, Leeston, Southbridge, Doyleston and the Lower Selwyn Huts. By 7 am on 2 May, Makgabutlane reported that rainfall in the Canterbury region had begun to ease over the past 12 hours, with most places recording less than 10 mm during that period. Makgabutlane forecast that rain would continue easing throughout, with most of the wet front in the Canterbury region passing by the end of the day.

Following the flooding, local residents, farmers and business owners in the Banks peninsula settlements of Kinloch and Little River criticised Environment Canterbury and the Christchurch City Council for not opening the coastal lakes of Lake Forsyth and Lake Ellesmere to the sea prior to the flooding, contending that they could have minimised flood damage to local homes, farms and businesses. In response to criticism, Environment Canterbury said that Lake Ellesmere could only be opened in a joint decision with the local Māori iwi (tribe) Ngāi Tahu. Ultimately the two parties decided not to open Ellesmere on 29 April due to rough and stormy sea conditions. On 2 May, Emergency Management Minister Mark Mitchell defended local authorities' decision not to open the lakes' flood gates. He also visited Environment Canterbury staff and local mana whenua. Similarly, the Christchurch City Council and Three Waters head Gavin Hutchison declined to open Lake Forsyth on the grounds that rough sea conditions would have pushed the water back into the lake and surrounding area.

On 4 May, Mayor Mauger reported there was land instability and closed roads in the Banks Peninsula. During that weekend, National MP Vanessa Weenink visited the area and reported there was a lot of cleanup due to land slips. A land slip in Akaroa's Lighthouse Road damaged the road. By 5 May, the Banks Peninsula still remained under a state of emergency.

On 11 May the state of emergency in Banks Peninsula was extended due to a land slip in Akaroa's Lighthouse Road, which had caused significant land movement. On 12 May, Mayor Mauger lifted the Bank Peninsula state of emergency after monitoring equipment indicated that the land had stopped moving in the slip above Lighthouse Road.

== Rest of the South Island ==
On Tuesday 6 May, MetService issued heavy rain warnings for Fiordland from Wednesday 10pm to 8pm Thursday and Westland from midnight Wednesday to 3am Friday. The service also issued strong wind watches for Fiordland, Southland, as well as parts of Canterbury and Otago.
