= Rings Beach =

Rural settlement in New Zealand

- Interactive map of Rings Beach
- Coordinates: 36.729°S 175.689°E
- Country: New Zealand
- Region: Waikato
- District: Thames-Coromandel District
- Ward: Mercury Bay ward
- Community Board: Mercury Bay Community
- Electorates: Coromandel; Hauraki-Waikato (Māori)

Government
  - Council: Thames-Coromandel District Council
  - Regional council: Waikato Regional Council
  - Mayor of Thames-Coromandel: Peter Revell
  - Coromandel MP: Scott Simpson
  - Hauraki-Waikato MP: Hana-Rawhiti Maipi-Clarke

Area
  - Total: 1.41 km^{2} (0.54 sq mi)

Population (June 2025)
  - Total: 140
  - Density: 99/km^{2} (260/sq mi)

Rings Beach is a beach settlement on the Coromandel Peninsula of New Zealand, between Matarangi on the west and Kūaotunu on the east. The eastern end of the settlement is known as Kūaotunu West.

The beach was named after Frank Ring, a local sheep farmer. He was the son of Charles Ring who discovered gold in the Coromandel in 1852.

Rings Beach loop track is a walking track through forest and wetlands inland from the beach.

== Demographics ==
Rings Beach is described by Statistics New Zealand as a rural settlement. It covers 1.41 km^{2} (0.54 sq mi) and had an estimated population of 140 as of June 2025, with a population density of 99 people per km^{2}. Rings Beach is part of the larger Mercury Bay North statistical area.

Historical population
| Year | Pop. | ±% p.a. |
|---|---|---|
| 2006 | 120 | — |
| 2013 | 99 | −2.71% |
| 2018 | 120 | +3.92% |
| 2023 | 141 | +3.28% |

Rings Beach had a population of 141 in the 2023 New Zealand census, an increase of 21 people (17.5%) since the 2018 census, and an increase of 42 people (42.4%) since the 2013 census. There were 78 males and 66 females in 69 dwellings. 2.1% of people identified as LGBTIQ+. The median age was 63.2 years (compared with 38.1 years nationally). There were 12 people (8.5%) aged under 15 years, 9 (6.4%) aged 15 to 29, 57 (40.4%) aged 30 to 64, and 66 (46.8%) aged 65 or older.

People could identify as more than one ethnicity. The results were 95.7% European (Pākehā), 6.4% Māori, 2.1% Pasifika, and 2.1% Asian. English was spoken by 97.9%, Māori language by 2.1%, and other languages by 8.5%. No language could be spoken by 2.1% (e.g. too young to talk). The percentage of people born overseas was 21.3, compared with 28.8% nationally.

Religious affiliations were 29.8% Christian, and 2.1% Buddhist. People who answered that they had no religion were 61.7%, and 4.3% of people did not answer the census question.

Of those at least 15 years old, 30 (23.3%) people had a bachelor's or higher degree, 78 (60.5%) had a post-high school certificate or diploma, and 24 (18.6%) people exclusively held high school qualifications. The median income was $25,900, compared with $41,500 nationally. 6 people (4.7%) earned over $100,000 compared to 12.1% nationally. The employment status of those at least 15 was that 30 (23.3%) people were employed full-time, 30 (23.3%) were part-time, and 3 (2.3%) were unemployed.
