= Wellington Electricity =

New Zealand electricity distribution company

- Industry: Electricity distribution
- Predecessor: Vector Limited; United Networks; TransAlta
- Headquarters: Wellington, New Zealand
- Key people: Greg Skelton (CEO)
- Revenue: NZ$151,918,000
- Operating income: NZ$52,518,000
- Total assets: NZ$527,446,000
- Parent: CK Hutchison
- Website: www.welectricity.co.nz

Wellington Electricity, registered as Wellington Electricity Lines Limited, is an electricity distribution company, based in Wellington, New Zealand.

Wellington Electricity supplies electricity to approximately 400,000 consumers through over 176,000 installation connection points (ICPs) in its network that covers the Wellington city, Porirua and the Hutt Valley regions. The network is owned by a multinational conglomerate corporation CK Hutchison Holdings.

== Distribution network ==
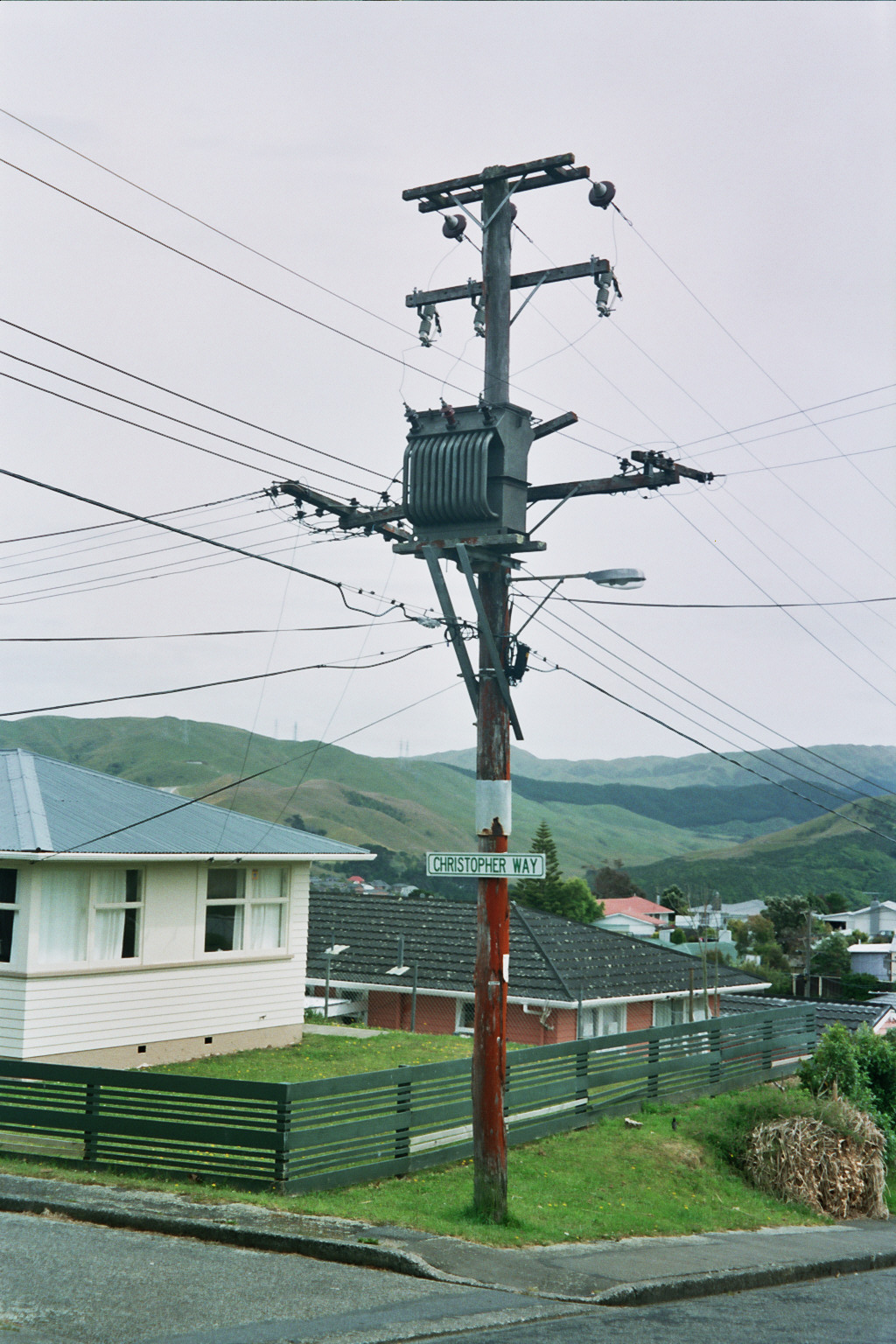
An older Wellington Electricity power pole with an 11/0.4 kV pole-mounted distribution transformer in Paparangi, 2006.

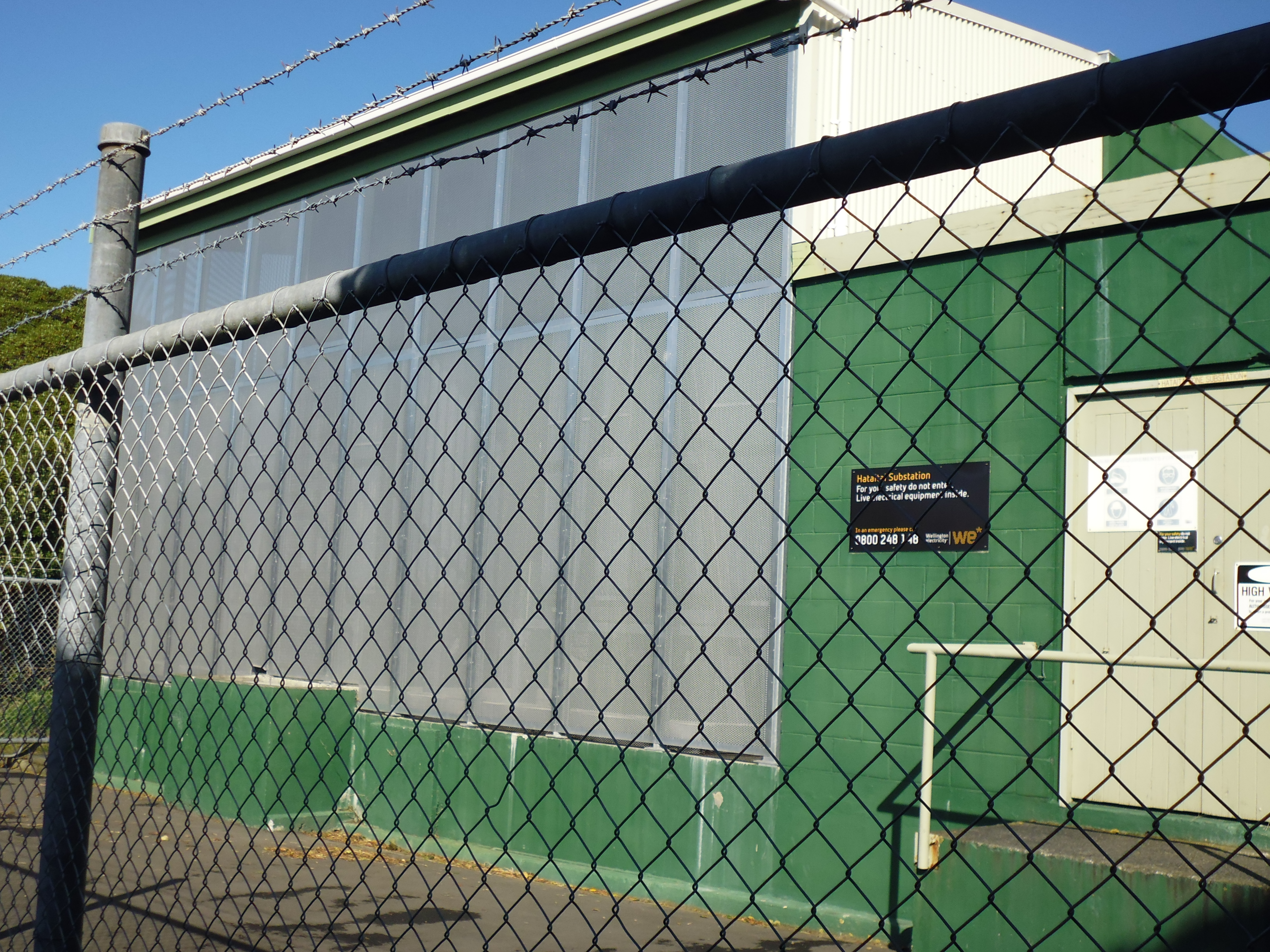
The Hataitai zone substation

Wellington Electricity uses a 33 kV sub-transmission network, with 11 kV high-voltage distribution and 230/400 V low-voltage distribution. The network comprises a high percentage of underground cabling, with 66% of the sub-transmission circuits being cabled. Wellington Electricity also owned and operated several rectifier stations and a 53 km network of DC cables in central Wellington to supply the trolleybus system, which was closed down and removed in 2017.

The majority of electricity used in Wellington is taken from the national grid at Transpower substations located at Upper Hutt (Birchville), Haywards, Melling, Gracefield, Pāuatahanui, Takapu Road (to the east of Linden), Kaiwharawhara, Wilton and Central Park (Mount Cook). The network also receives up to 12 MW of electricity from power generating facilities connected to the distribution network, including two landfill gas stations at Silverstream and Happy Valley, a gas fired cogeneration facility at Wellington Hospital, and a single wind turbine in Brooklyn.

A major project was completed in 2012 to replace 33 kV underground cables that supply part of the Wellington Central Business district. New cables were installed from Wilton to Moore Street in Thorndon.

=== Network statistics ===
Wellington Electricity Lines Limited network statistics for the year ending 31 March 2024
Parameter	Value
Regulatory asset base	$847 million
Line charge revenue	$145.0 million
Capital expenditure	$70.3 million
Operating expenditure	$38.6 million
Customer connections	175,249
Energy delivered	2,314 GWh
Peak demand	563 MW
Total line length	4,864 km
Distribution and low-voltage overhead lines	1,656 km
Distribution and low-voltage underground cables	3,013 km
Subtransmission lines and cables	194 km
Poles	40,017
Distribution transformers	4,564
Zone substation transformers	52
Average interruption duration (SAIDI)	60 minutes
Average interruption frequency (SAIFI)	0.70

== Major incidents ==
On 1 May 2025 a severe storm with the strongest winds in Wellington in over a decade caused extensive damage to the network, leading to 8,000 outages. By 5 May, there were still 300 homes without power, and Wellington Electricity was criticised for inadequate communications about the restoration work. As of 7 May, a small number of houses in Wellington were still without power.

== History of ownership ==
The ownership of Wellington Electricity has changed significantly since the early 1990s. At the start of the 90s, the Wellington City Council Municipal Electricity Department (MED) and the Hutt Valley Electric Power Board (HVEPB) merged their electricity assets. In 1992, the passing of the Energy Companies Act required that the various franchised electricity distribution and retailing organisations then operating in New Zealand become commercial power companies with a responsibility to operate as a successful business. Two new companies were formed, Capital Power and Energy Direct respectively.

In 1996, the Canadian owned power company TransAlta acquired both companies to form a consolidated Wellington electricity distribution network business. The Electricity Industry Reform Act was passed in 1998, and this required that all electricity companies be split into either the lines (network) business or the supply business (generating and/or selling electricity) by 1 April 1999. Ownership of the lines network was passed to United Networks in 1998, which Vector acquired in 2003.

In July 2008, the network was purchased by Cheung Kong Infrastructure Holdings Limited and Hong Kong Electric Holdings Limited to create Wellington Electricity. Hong Kong Electric Holdings Limited changed its name on 16 February 2011 to Power Assets Holdings Limited. In 2015, Cheung Kong Holdings merged with its main associate company Hutchison Whampoa to form CK Hutchison Holdings.

== See also ==
- Electricity sector in New Zealand
