= Laurel Amy Eva Campbell =

New Zealand racehorse trainer

Laurel Amy Eva Campbell (15 March 1902 –3 January 1971) was a New Zealand racehorse trainer. She was born in Doyleston, North Canterbury, New Zealand on 15 March 1902.
