= Pataua River =

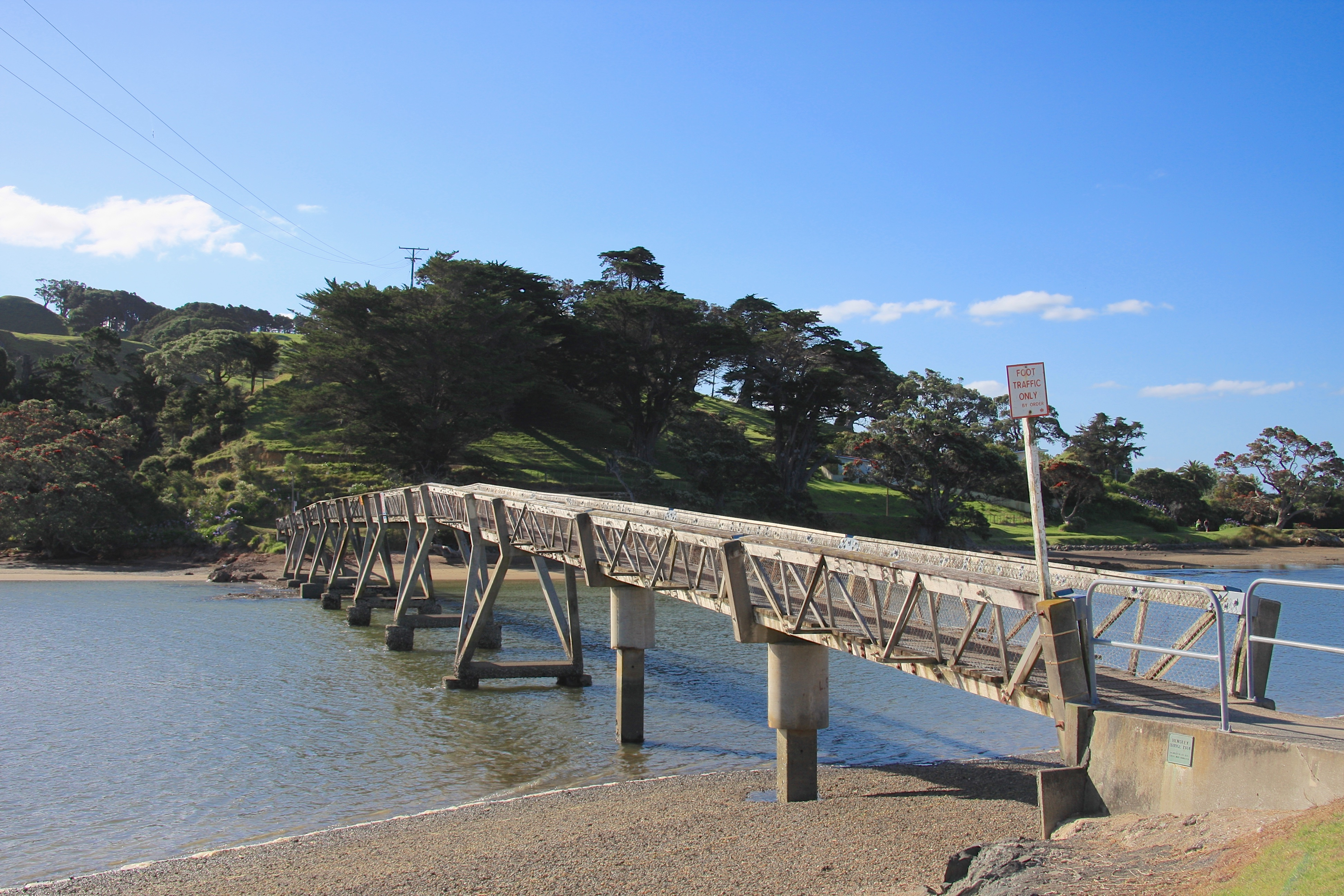
- Footbridge over the Pataua River
- Native name: Pataua (Māori)

Location
- Country: New Zealand
- Region: Northland Region
- District: Whangarei District

Physical characteristics
- Mouth
  - location: Ngunguru Bay
  - coordinates: 35°42′50″S 174°31′35″E
- Length: 10 km (6.2 mi)

The Pataua River is a tidal river of the Northland Region of New Zealand's North Island. It flows northeast from its origins east of Whangārei, reaching the Pacific Ocean at the southern end of Ngunguru Bay. At its mouth, the river is flanked by the settlements of Pataua North and Pataua South, which are connected by a footbridge.

== See also ==
- List of rivers of New Zealand
