= Kūaotunu River =

River in New Zealand

Coordinates: 36°45′S 175°43′E

Location
- Country: New Zealand

Physical characteristics
- Mouth
  - location: Kūaotunu Beach
  - elevation: sea level

The Kūaotunu River is a short river on the eastern Coromandel Peninsula on the North Island of New Zealand. It flows north towards the coast at Kūaotunu.

== See also ==
- List of rivers of New Zealand
