= Matakawau Creek =

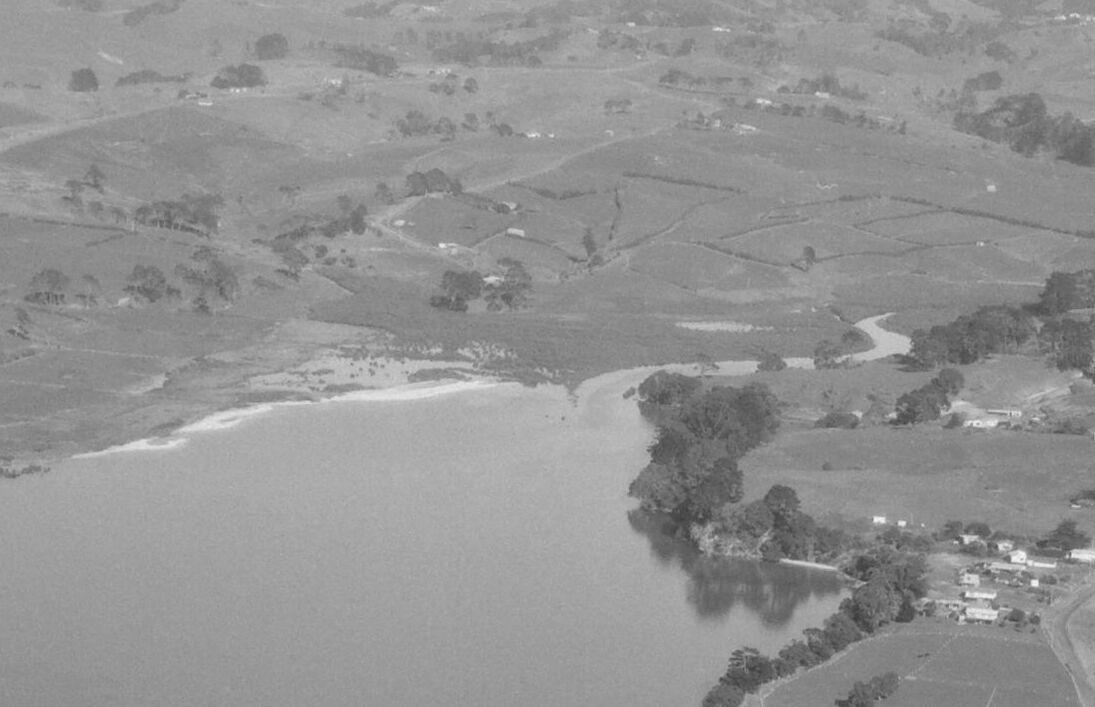
- 1989 aerial view
- Route of the Matakawau Creek
- Mouth of the Matakawau Creek Matakawau Creek (North Island)
- Native name: Matakawau (Māori)

Location
- Country: New Zealand
- Island: North Island
- Region: Auckland
- Local Board Area: Franklin

Physical characteristics
- Source
  - coordinates: 37.1412°S 174.60305°E
- Mouth: Manukau Harbour
  - coordinates: 37°06′57″S 174°39′31″E

Basin features
- Progression: Matakawau Creek → Waiuku Channel → Manukau Harbour → Tasman Sea

The Matakawau Creek is a stream located on the Āwhitu Peninsula of the Auckland Region of New Zealand. It flows eastwards towards the Waiuku Channel of the Manukau Harbour.

== Geography ==
The settlement of Pollok is located to the south of the upper sections of the stream, while Matakawau Point is located at the estuarine mouth of the Matakawau Creek.The Matakawau Creek Esplanade Reserve is found along the left bank of the estuarine section of the creek.

Areas of the upper catchment are forested with Broafleaf forest can be found in the upper catchment of the Matakawau Creek, and a salt marsh environment is found at the creek mouth.

== See also ==
- List of rivers of New Zealand
