= Irwell, New Zealand =

Rural township in New Zealand

Irwell
- Rural locality
- Interactive map of Irwell
- Coordinates: 43°42′15″S 172°21′41″E
- Country: New Zealand
- Region: Canterbury
- Territorial authority: Selwyn District
- Ward: Ellesmere
- Electorates: Selwyn; Te Tai Tonga (Māori)

Government
  - Territorial authority: Selwyn District Council
  - Regional council: Environment Canterbury
  - Mayor of Selwyn: Lydia Gliddon
  - Selwyn MP: Nicola Grigg
  - Te Tai Tonga MP: Tākuta Ferris
- Time zone: UTC+12 (New Zealand Standard Time)
  - Summer (DST): UTC+13 (New Zealand Daylight Time)

Irwell was a small rural township in Canterbury, New Zealand on the intersection of Leeston and Selwyn Lake Roads. All that remains are the former school hall, a church, and a small number of houses.

== History ==
In the 1870s it consisted of a two stores, two bake houses, a flour mill, a hotel, and a blacksmiths. In 1879 a small school was established with 32 pupils. By the 1920s it had 50 pupils. The school was closed at the end of 1937 and merged with Leeston School. In 1944 the Ellesmere Guardian reported that the old mills at Irwell were one of the few early buildings still standing in the area.

== Heritage buildings ==
Two buildings at Irwell are listed as heritage sites in the Selwyn District Plan. They are the former Irwell school hall from 1879 and St Mary's Anglican Church on Selwyn Lake Road from 1895.

== Demographics ==
Irwell statistical area, which also includes Doyleston and Selwyn Huts, covers 128.15 km^{2} (49.48 sq mi). It had an estimated population of 1,400 as of June 2025, with a population density of 11 people per km^{2}.

Historical population
Year	Pop.	±% p.a.
2006	1,182	—
2013	1,275	+1.09%
2018	1,278	+0.05%
2023	1,347	+1.06%

Irwell had a population of 1,347 in the 2023 New Zealand census, an increase of 69 people (5.4%) since the 2018 census, and an increase of 72 people (5.6%) since the 2013 census. There were 699 males, 642 females, and 6 people of other genders in 540 dwellings. 2.4% of people identified as LGBTIQ+. The median age was 45.4 years (compared with 38.1 years nationally). There were 234 people (17.4%) aged under 15 years, 183 (13.6%) aged 15 to 29, 705 (52.3%) aged 30 to 64, and 225 (16.7%) aged 65 or older.

People could identify as more than one ethnicity. The results were 91.5% European (Pākehā); 9.6% Māori; 2.0% Pasifika; 3.8% Asian; 0.9% Middle Eastern, Latin American and African New Zealanders (MELAA); and 3.8% other, which includes people giving their ethnicity as "New Zealander". English was spoken by 98.4%, Māori by 1.8%, Samoan by 0.4%, and other languages by 5.8%. No language could be spoken by 1.1% (e.g. too young to talk). New Zealand Sign Language was known by 0.2%. The percentage of people born overseas was 16.0, compared with 28.8% nationally.

Religious affiliations were 29.0% Christian, 0.9% Hindu, 0.2% Māori religious beliefs, 0.2% Buddhist, and 0.9% other religions. People who answered that they had no religion were 61.5%, and 7.1% of people did not answer the census question.

Of those at least 15 years old, 210 (18.9%) people had a bachelor's or higher degree, 621 (55.8%) had a post-high school certificate or diploma, and 279 (25.1%) people exclusively held high school qualifications. The median income was $45,100, compared with $41,500 nationally. 114 people (10.2%) earned over $100,000 compared to 12.1% nationally. The employment status of those at least 15 was 621 (55.8%) full-time, 165 (14.8%) part-time, and 30 (2.7%) unemployed.
