= Milford Huts =

- Rural settlement
- Interactive map of Milford Huts
- Coordinates: 44.275°S 171.348°E
- Country: New Zealand
- Region: Canterbury
- Territorial authority: Timaru District
- Ward: Pleasant Point-Temuka
- Community: Temuka
- Electorates: Rangitata; Te Tai Tonga (Māori)

Government
  - Territorial authority: Timaru District Council
  - Regional council: Environment Canterbury
  - Mayor of Timaru: Nigel Bowen
  - Rangitata MP: James Meager
  - Te Tai Tonga MP: Tākuta Ferris

Area
  - Total: 0.26 km^{2} (0.10 sq mi)

Population (June 2025)
  - Total: 60
  - Density: 230/km^{2} (600/sq mi)
- Time zone: UTC+12 (New Zealand Standard Time)
  - Summer (DST): UTC+13 (New Zealand Daylight Time)
- Postcode: 7986
- Local iwi: Ngāi Tahu

Milford Huts is a bach community in the Timaru district and Canterbury region of New Zealand's South Island. Milford Huts is on the northern side of the Ōpihi River mouth, 7.5 kilometres southeast of Temuka by road.

The area is at risk of flooding from the river. The Milford lagoon which protects the settlement is shrinking due to coastal erosion.

== Demographics ==
Milford Huts is described as a rural settlement by Statistics New Zealand, and covers 0.26 km^{2} (0.10 sq mi). It had an estimated population of 60 as of June 2025, with a population density of 231 people per km^{2}. The settlement is part of the larger Waitohi statistical area.

Historical population
Year	Pop.	±% p.a.
2006	60	—
2013	57	−0.73%
2018	75	+5.64%
2023	63	−3.43%
The 2006 population is for a larger area of 1.27 km^{2}. Source:

Milford Huts had a population of 63 in the 2023 New Zealand census, a decrease of 12 people (−16.0%) since the 2018 census, and an increase of 6 people (10.5%) since the 2013 census. There were 30 males and 30 females in 30 dwellings. The median age was 54.8 years (compared with 38.1 years nationally). There were 3 people (4.8%) aged under 15 years, 9 (14.3%) aged 15 to 29, 33 (52.4%) aged 30 to 64, and 15 (23.8%) aged 65 or older.

People could identify as more than one ethnicity. The results were 76.2% European (Pākehā), 28.6% Māori, 4.8% Asian, and 9.5% other, which includes people giving their ethnicity as "New Zealander". English was spoken by 100.0%. The percentage of people born overseas was 9.5, compared with 28.8% nationally.

The sole religious affiliation given was 19.0% Christian. People who answered that they had no religion were 66.7%.

Of those at least 15 years old, 3 (5.0%) people had a bachelor's or higher degree, 33 (55.0%) had a post-high school certificate or diploma, and 21 (35.0%) people exclusively held high school qualifications. The median income was $24,200, compared with $41,500 nationally. The employment status of those at least 15 was 15 (25.0%) full-time, 6 (10.0%) part-time, and 6 (10.0%) unemployed.

== See also ==
- Selwyn Huts
- Waipopo
