= Matakawau Point =

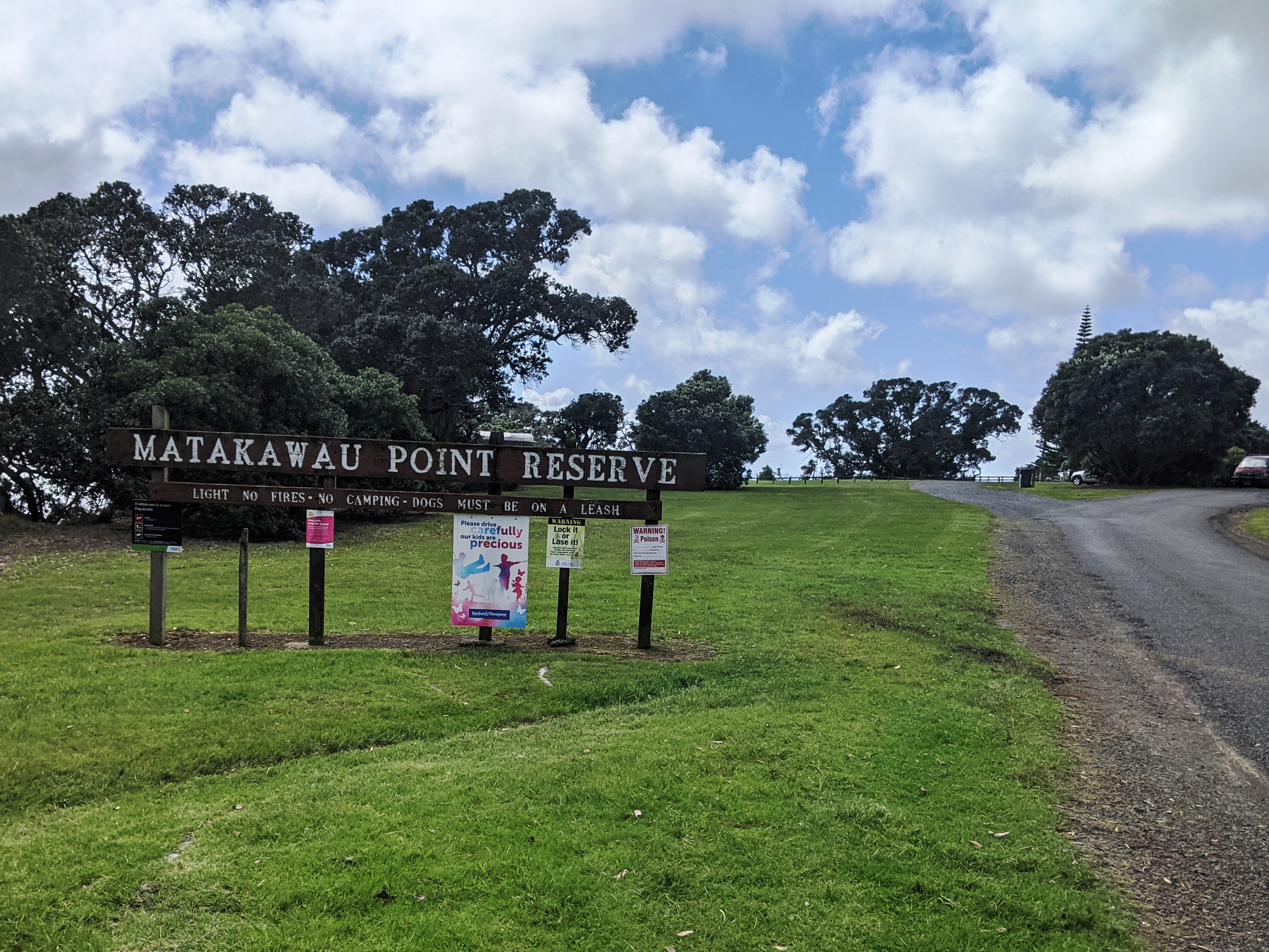
- Matakawau Point Reserve
- Interactive map of Matakawau Point
- Coordinates: 37.106°S 174.668°E
- Country: New Zealand
- Region: Auckland Region
- Ward: Franklin ward
- Community board: Franklin Local Board
- Electorates: Port Waikato; Hauraki-Waikato

Government
  - Territorial Authority: Auckland Council

Area
  - Total: 0.66 km^{2} (0.25 sq mi)

Population (June 2025)
  - Total: 120
  - Density: 180/km^{2} (470/sq mi)

Matakawau Point is a rural settlement on the east side of the Āwhitu Peninsula and west side of the Manukau Harbour in the Auckland Region of New Zealand. The mouth of Matakawau Creek is south of Matakawau Point.

The sandstone cliffs of the coast are prone to erosion, which has resulted in some areas of the Matakawau Point Reserve been fenced off. The local beaches are Sargeants Beach and Matakawau Beach. The latter beach and other low-lying areas are at risk of flooding.

== Demographics ==
Statistics New Zealand describes Matakawau Point as a rural settlement, which covers 0.66 km^{2} (0.25 sq mi) and had an estimated population of 120 as of June 2025, with a population density of 182 people per km^{2}. Matakawau Point is part of the larger Āwhitu statistical area.

Historical population
Year	Pop.	±% p.a.
2006	84	—
2013	69	−2.77%
2018	102	+8.13%
2023	120	+3.30%

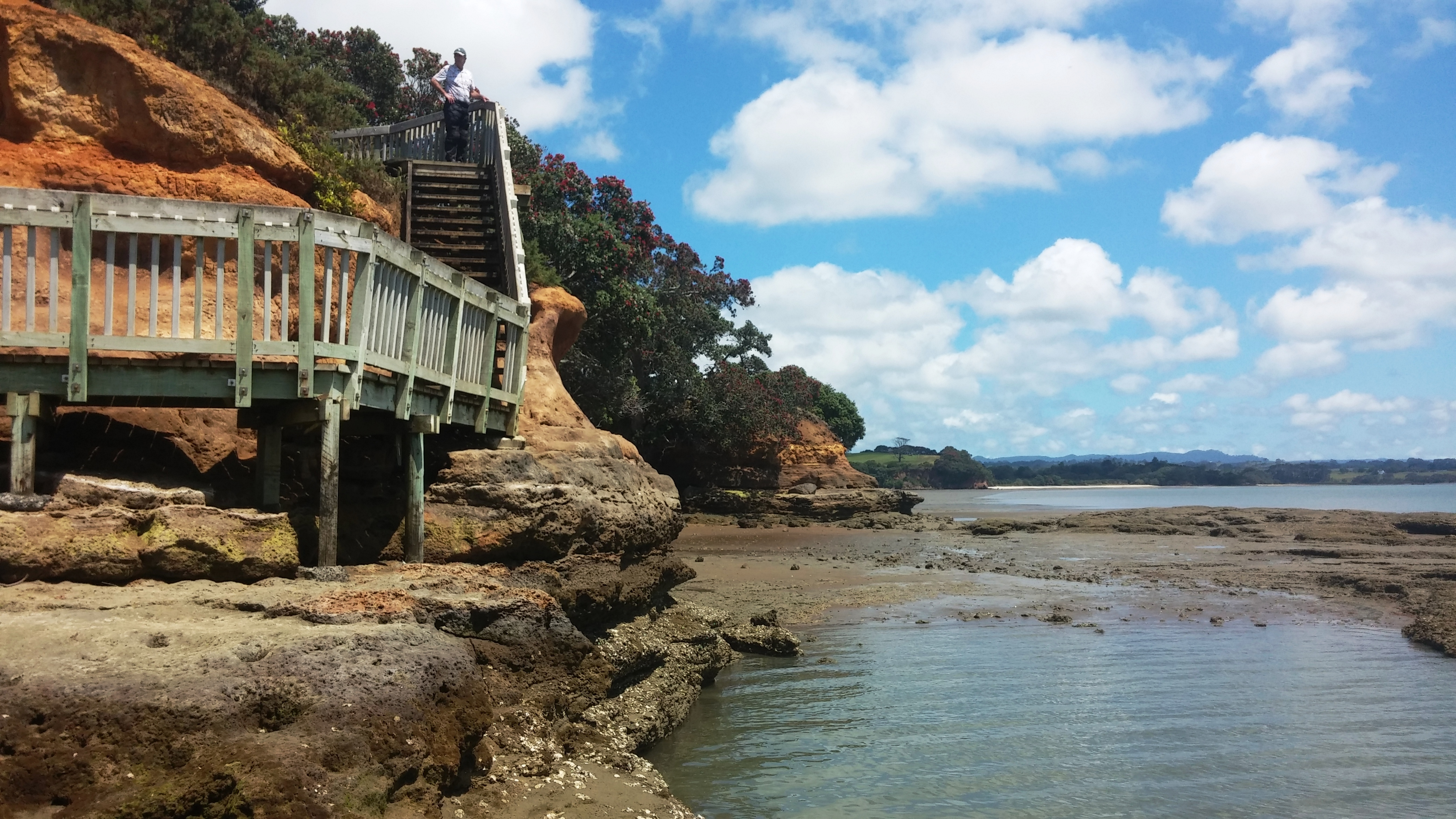
View from the wharf at Matakawau Point Reserve

Matakawau Point had a population of 120 in the 2023 New Zealand census, an increase of 18 people (17.6%) since the 2018 census, and an increase of 51 people (73.9%) since the 2013 census. There were 57 males and 63 females in 63 dwellings. 2.5% of people identified as LGBTIQ+. The median age was 61.9 years (compared with 38.1 years nationally). There were 9 people (7.5%) aged under 15 years, 12 (10.0%) aged 15 to 29, 63 (52.5%) aged 30 to 64, and 39 (32.5%) aged 65 or older.

People could identify as more than one ethnicity. The results were 92.5% European (Pākehā), 15.0% Māori, and 2.5% Pasifika. English was spoken by 100.0%, Māori language by 2.5%, and other languages by 5.0%. New Zealand Sign Language was known by 2.5%. The percentage of people born overseas was 17.5, compared with 28.8% nationally.

Religious affiliations were 32.5% Christian, and 2.5% Buddhist. People who answered that they had no religion were 65.0%, and 2.5% of people did not answer the census question.

Of those at least 15 years old, 21 (18.9%) people had a bachelor's or higher degree, 69 (62.2%) had a post-high school certificate or diploma, and 24 (21.6%) people exclusively held high school qualifications. The median income was $36,600, compared with $41,500 nationally. 9 people (8.1%) earned over $100,000 compared to 12.1% nationally. The employment status of those at least 15 was that 45 (40.5%) people were employed full-time, 9 (8.1%) were part-time, and 3 (2.7%) were unemployed.
