= Waipopo =

Waipopo Waipōpō
- Rural settlement
- Interactive map of Waipopo
- Coordinates: 44.273°S 171.332°E
- Country: New Zealand
- Region: Canterbury
- Territorial authority: Timaru District
- Ward: Pleasant Point-Temuka

Area
  - Total: 0.25 km^{2} (0.097 sq mi)

Population (2018 Census)
  - Total: 87
  - Density: 350/km^{2} (900/sq mi)

Waipopo or Waipopo Huts is a bach community in the Timaru district and Canterbury region of New Zealand's South Island. Waipopo is on the southern side of the Ōpihi River mouth, 11.5 kilometres southeast of Temuka and 17.3 northeast of Timaru by road.

The huts are on land owned by the Waipopo Huts Māori Reserve Trust, who provided a 100-year lease of the land which expired in 2003. Twenty-seven leaseholders declined to sign a new lease. The Trust subsequently charged rent for the land at higher prices.

== Demographics ==
Waipopo is described as a rural settlement by Statistics New Zealand, and covers 0.25 km^{2} (0.097 sq mi). The settlement is part of the larger Levels statistical area.

Historical population
Year	Pop.	±% p.a.
2006	93	—
2013	78	−2.48%
2018	87	+2.21%

Waipopo had a population of 87 at the 2018 New Zealand census, an increase of 9 people (11.5%) since the 2013 census, and a decrease of 6 people (-6.5%) since the 2006 census. There were 48 households. There were 54 males and 36 females, giving a sex ratio of 1.5 males per female. The median age was 54.5 years (compared with 37.4 years nationally), with 3 people (3.4%) aged under 15 years, 18 (20.7%) aged 15 to 29, 39 (44.8%) aged 30 to 64, and 30 (34.5%) aged 65 or older.

Ethnicities were 86.2% European/Pākehā, 27.6% Māori, 3.4% Pacific peoples, and 3.4% Asian (totals add to more than 100% since people could identify with multiple ethnicities).

Although some people objected to giving their religion, 51.7% had no religion, 44.8% were Christian and 3.4% had other religions.

Of those at least 15 years old, 6 (7.1%) people had a bachelor or higher degree, and 33 (39.3%) people had no formal qualifications. The median income was $28,200, compared with $31,800 nationally. The employment status of those at least 15 was that 42 (50.0%) people were employed full-time, 12 (14.3%) were part-time, and 3 (3.6%) were unemployed.

== See also ==
- Milford Huts
