= Pataua =

Pataua Pātaua
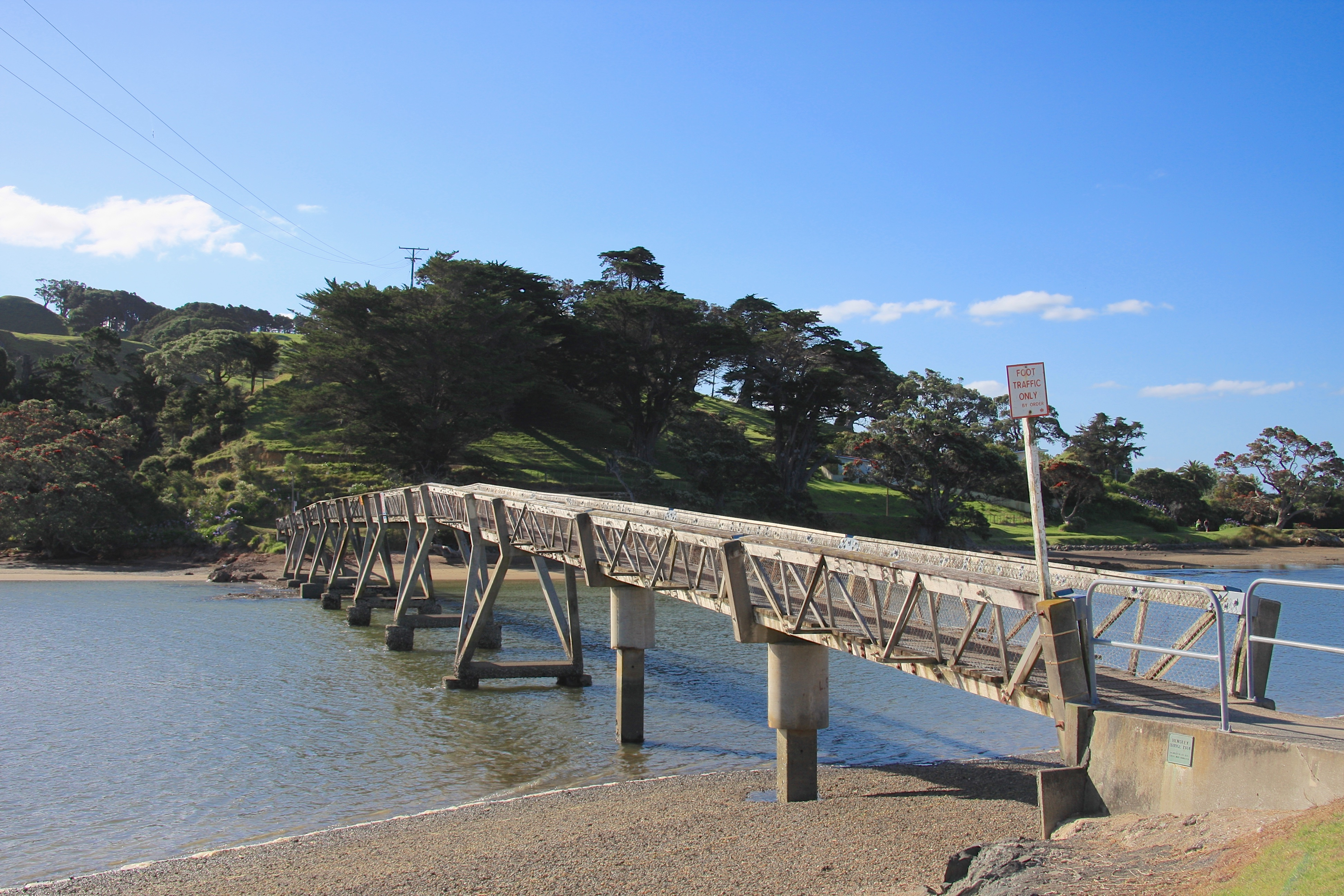
- Footbridge across the Pataua River joining Pataua North and Pataua South
- Interactive map of Pataua
- Coordinates: 35.718847°S 174.524033°E
- Country: New Zealand
- Region: Northland Region
- District: Whangarei District
- Ward: Whangarei Heads Ward

Government
  - Territorial authority: Whangarei District Council
  - Regional council: Northland Regional Council
  - Mayor of Whangārei: Ken Couper
  - Whangārei MP: Lloyd Budd
  - Te Tai Tokerau MP: TBD

Area
  - Total: 0.33 km^{2} (0.13 sq mi)

Population (June 2025)
  - Total: 180
  - Density: 550/km^{2} (1,400/sq mi)

Pataua (Māori: Pātaua) is a settlement in the Whangarei District of Northland, New Zealand. It sits on both sides of the Pataua River, at its mouth on the Pacific Ocean. Pataua North and Pataua South are connected by a footbridge over the estuary that was built in 1958.

Pataua South sits on an estuary plain at the base of a peninsula that runs eastward, with the Pataua River estuary and the ocean to its north and the Taiharuru River estuary to its south. The peninsula was an island, being surrounded by water and swampland, until the swamp was drained for agricultural land. The peninsula is still known as Pataua Island. The swamp was nicknamed Frog Town because of its many frogs. The Pataua Island Track, managed by the Department of Conservation, runs to a small ocean beach known as Frog Town Beach.

Pataua North is mostly built on coastal dunelands. The Pataua Outdoor Education and Recreation Trust runs a community hall there that is now used mostly for school camps by primary and secondary schools from the Whangarei District. The site was the location of Pataua School until it closed in 1972.

In recent years a number of the surrounding beef farms have moved towards permaculture, sustainability, and ecotourism. The river mouth bar and Parauwanui Beach at Pataua North are suitable for surfing, though care must be taken for rip currents, especially near the river mouth.

Pātaua Marae at Pataua South belongs to the Ngāti Kororā hapū, part of Ngātiwai. The marae has no meeting house.

== Demographics ==
Statistics New Zealand describes Pataua as a rural settlement. The settlement covers 0.33 km^{2} (0.13 sq mi) and had an estimated population of 180 as of June 2025, with a population density of 87 people per km^{2}. The settlement is part of the larger Pataua statistical area.

Historical population for the settlement
Year	Pop.	±% p.a.
2006	165	—
2013	126	−3.78%
2018	177	+7.03%
2023	165	−1.39%
The 2006 population is for a larger area of 2.08 km^{2} Source:

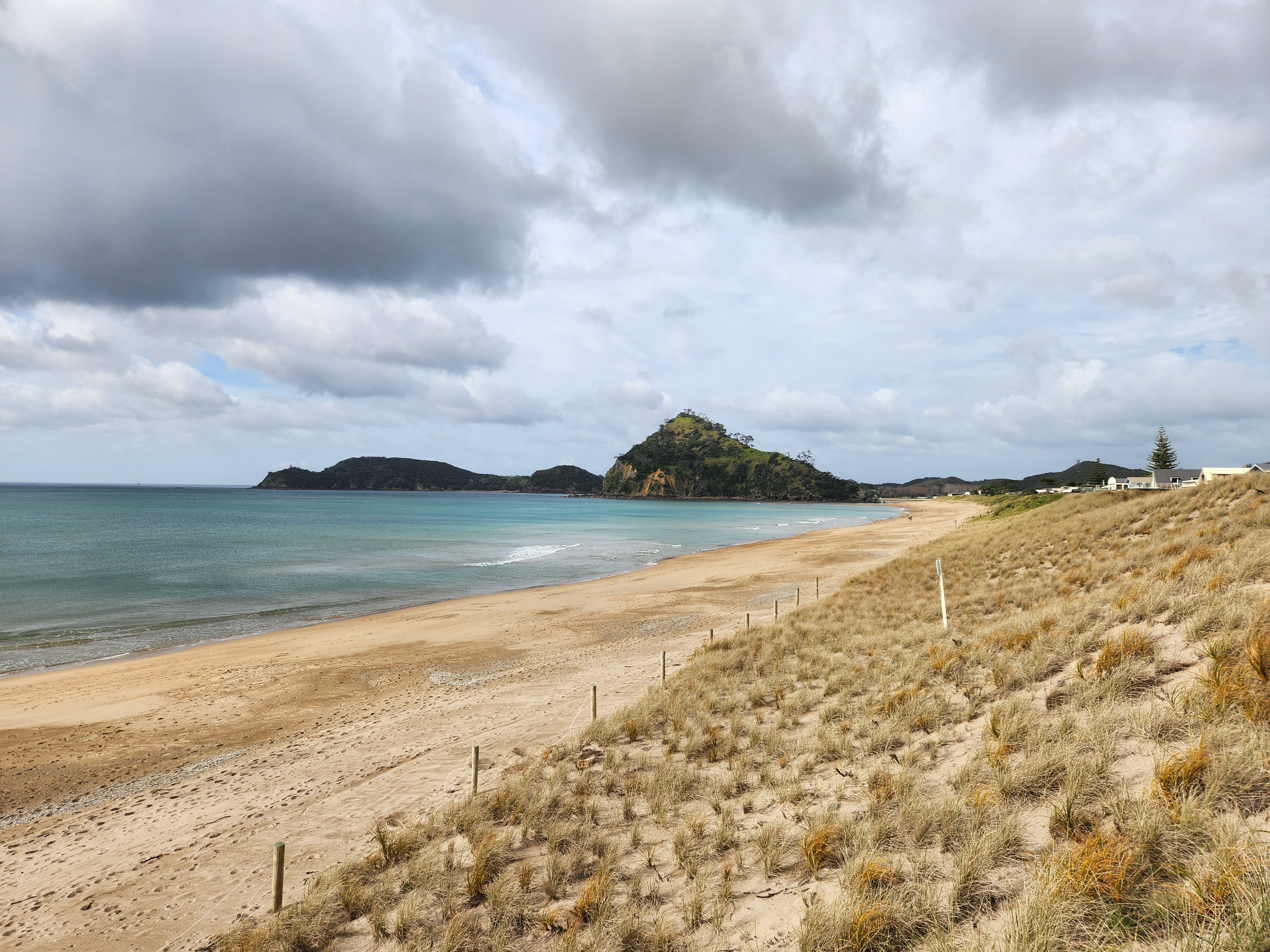
Parauwanui Beach looking south to Te Whangai Head, with houses of Pataua North at right, 2023

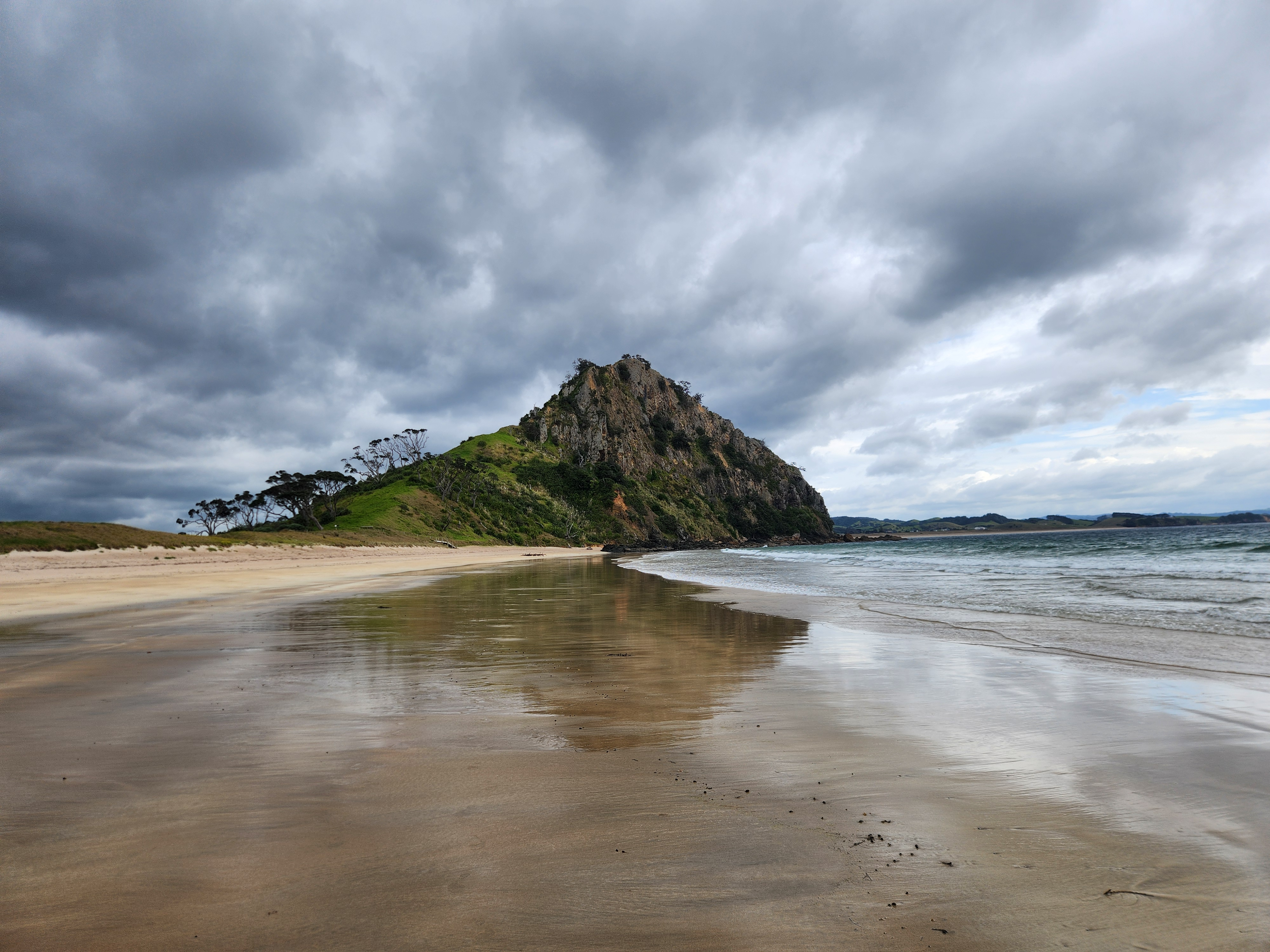
Frog Town Beach looking north to Te Whangai Head, 2023

Pātaua had a population of 165 in the 2023 New Zealand census, a decrease of 12 people (−6.8%) since the 2018 census, and an increase of 39 people (31.0%) since the 2013 census. There were 81 males and 84 females in 66 dwellings. The median age was 53.4 years (compared with 38.1 years nationally). There were 33 people (20.0%) aged under 15 years, 21 (12.7%) aged 15 to 29, 72 (43.6%) aged 30 to 64, and 39 (23.6%) aged 65 or older.

People could identify as more than one ethnicity. The results were 87.3% European (Pākehā), 21.8% Māori, 3.6% Pasifika, 1.8% Asian, and 3.6% other, which includes people giving their ethnicity as "New Zealander". English was spoken by 98.2%, Māori language by 5.5%, and other languages by 5.5%. No language could be spoken by 1.8% (e.g. too young to talk). The percentage of people born overseas was 9.1, compared with 28.8% nationally.

Religious affiliations were 21.8% Christian, 1.8% Māori religious beliefs, and 1.8% New Age. People who answered that they had no religion were 74.5%, and 1.8% of people did not answer the census question.

Of those at least 15 years old, 21 (15.9%) people had a bachelor's or higher degree, 90 (68.2%) had a post-high school certificate or diploma, and 12 (9.1%) people exclusively held high school qualifications. The median income was $41,500, compared with $41,500 nationally. 27 people (20.5%) earned over $100,000 compared to 12.1% nationally. The employment status of those at least 15 was that 63 (47.7%) people were employed full-time and 15 (11.4%) were part-time.

=== Pataua statistical area ===
Pataua statistical area covers 128.71 km^{2} (49.70 sq mi) and had an estimated population of 1,820 as of June 2025, with a population density of 14 people per km^{2}.

Historical population for the statistical area
Year	Pop.	±% p.a.
2006	1,131	—
2013	1,278	+1.76%
2018	1,584	+4.39%
2023	1,788	+2.45%

Pātaua had a population of 1,788 in the 2023 New Zealand census, an increase of 204 people (12.9%) since the 2018 census, and an increase of 510 people (39.9%) since the 2013 census. There were 894 males, 885 females and 9 people of other genders in 636 dwellings. 1.8% of people identified as LGBTIQ+. The median age was 45.4 years (compared with 38.1 years nationally). There were 351 people (19.6%) aged under 15 years, 252 (14.1%) aged 15 to 29, 894 (50.0%) aged 30 to 64, and 294 (16.4%) aged 65 or older.

People could identify as more than one ethnicity. The results were 87.1% European (Pākehā); 20.0% Māori; 1.3% Pasifika; 2.3% Asian; 0.8% Middle Eastern, Latin American and African New Zealanders (MELAA); and 2.9% other, which includes people giving their ethnicity as "New Zealander". English was spoken by 97.1%, Māori language by 4.5%, Samoan by 0.2%, and other languages by 8.6%. No language could be spoken by 1.8% (e.g. too young to talk). New Zealand Sign Language was known by 0.5%. The percentage of people born overseas was 20.8, compared with 28.8% nationally.

Religious affiliations were 20.1% Christian, 0.7% Hindu, 1.7% Māori religious beliefs, 0.3% Buddhist, 0.8% New Age, 0.5% Jewish, and 0.8% other religions. People who answered that they had no religion were 67.1%, and 7.9% of people did not answer the census question.

Of those at least 15 years old, 231 (16.1%) people had a bachelor's or higher degree, 804 (55.9%) had a post-high school certificate or diploma, and 300 (20.9%) people exclusively held high school qualifications. The median income was $37,400, compared with $41,500 nationally. 174 people (12.1%) earned over $100,000 compared to 12.1% nationally. The employment status of those at least 15 was that 681 (47.4%) people were employed full-time, 246 (17.1%) were part-time, and 45 (3.1%) were unemployed.
