= Kūaotunu =

- Interactive map of Kūaotunu
- Coordinates: 36°43′19″S 175°43′49″E
- Country: New Zealand
- Region: Waikato
- District: Thames-Coromandel District
- Ward: Mercury Bay ward
- Community Board: Mercury Bay Community
- Electorates: Coromandel; Hauraki-Waikato (Māori)

Government
  - Council: Thames-Coromandel District Council
  - Regional council: Waikato Regional Council
  - Mayor of Thames-Coromandel: Peter Revell
  - Coromandel MP: Scott Simpson
  - Hauraki-Waikato MP: Hana-Rawhiti Maipi-Clarke

Area
  - Total: 2.51 km^{2} (0.97 sq mi)

Population (June 2025)
  - Total: 250
  - Density: 100/km^{2} (260/sq mi)
- Postcode(s): 3592

Kūaotunu is a small coastal township at the east coast of the Coromandel Peninsula on the mouth of the Kuaotunu River on the North Island of New Zealand.

== Name ==
The name of the settlement is of Māori origin, meaning ‘to inspire fear in young animals’ or ‘roasted young’, probably relating to the good hunting and fishing grounds in the area. In 2019, the name of the locality was officially gazetted as Kūaotunu.

== Demographics ==
Kūaotunu is described by Statistics New Zealand as a rural settlement. It covers 2.51 km^{2} (0.97 sq mi) and had an estimated population of 250 as of June 2025, with a population density of 100 people per km^{2}. Kūaotunu is part of the larger Mercury Bay North statistical area.

Historical population
Year	Pop.	±% p.a.
2006	225	—
2013	189	−2.46%
2018	201	+1.24%
2023	267	+5.84%
The 2006 population is for a larger area of 3.63 km^{2}. Source:

Kūaotunu had a population of 267 in the 2023 New Zealand census, an increase of 66 people (32.8%) since the 2018 census, and an increase of 78 people (41.3%) since the 2013 census. There were 132 males and 132 females in 99 dwellings. The median age was 54.0 years (compared with 38.1 years nationally). There were 36 people (13.5%) aged under 15 years, 27 (10.1%) aged 15 to 29, 138 (51.7%) aged 30 to 64, and 63 (23.6%) aged 65 or older.

People could identify as more than one ethnicity. The results were 92.1% European (Pākehā); 12.4% Māori; 2.2% Pasifika; 3.4% Asian; 2.2% Middle Eastern, Latin American and African New Zealanders (MELAA); and 5.6% other, which includes people giving their ethnicity as "New Zealander". English was spoken by 97.8%, Māori language by 1.1%, and other languages by 10.1%. The percentage of people born overseas was 21.3, compared with 28.8% nationally.

Religious affiliations were 15.7% Christian, 1.1% Islam, 1.1% Buddhist, and 1.1% other religions. People who answered that they had no religion were 69.7%, and 10.1% of people did not answer the census question.

Of those at least 15 years old, 42 (18.2%) people had a bachelor's or higher degree, 138 (59.7%) had a post-high school certificate or diploma, and 48 (20.8%) people exclusively held high school qualifications. The median income was $28,400, compared with $41,500 nationally. 18 people (7.8%) earned over $100,000 compared to 12.1% nationally. The employment status of those at least 15 was that 84 (36.4%) people were employed full-time, 48 (20.8%) were part-time, and 6 (2.6%) were unemployed.

== Tourism ==
Kūaotunu is a popular destination for summer holidays for tourists on the Coromandel tourist circuit. It is one of the most northern beaches on the east coast of the Coromandel Peninsula and is popular with campers, surfers and beach lovers.

== Mining ==
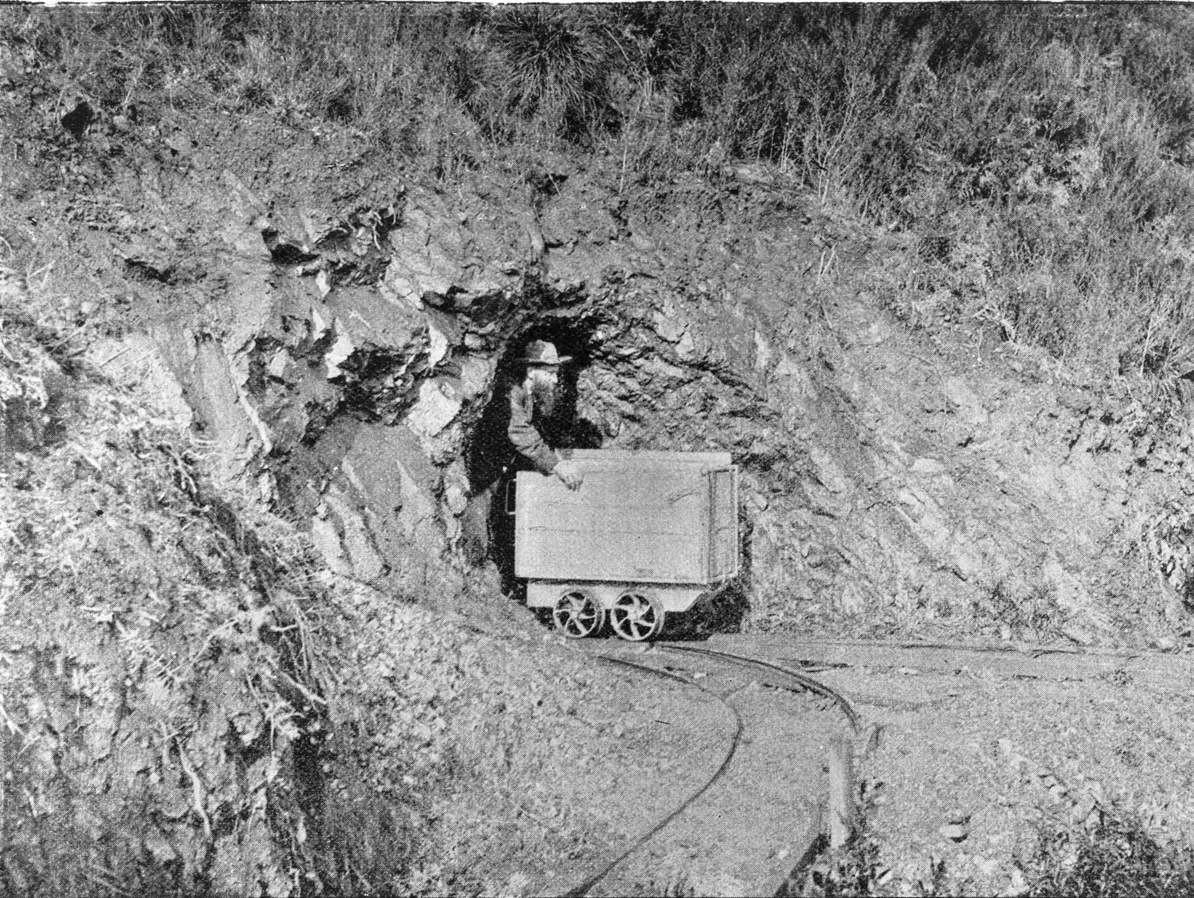
Mr Goldsworthy emerging from the Irene Tunnel at the Try Fluke Mine, Kuaotunu, 1890s

The local mines and their stamping batteries, which were installed in the late 19th century, had hopeful names: Try Fluke, Carbine, Mariposa, John Bull, Great Mercury, Red Mercury, Irene, Waiawa, Otama and Kapai-Vermont.

The Try Fluke Mine was a substantial gold mine close to Kūaotunu. Its name goes back to its discovery in 1889, when prospectors asked the Maori Charles Kawhine, known locally as Coffin, what he was doing, and he replied: "Oh, try fluke." At least this was understood instead of "Tryin’ luck", and the name stuck to the mine, which was established there.

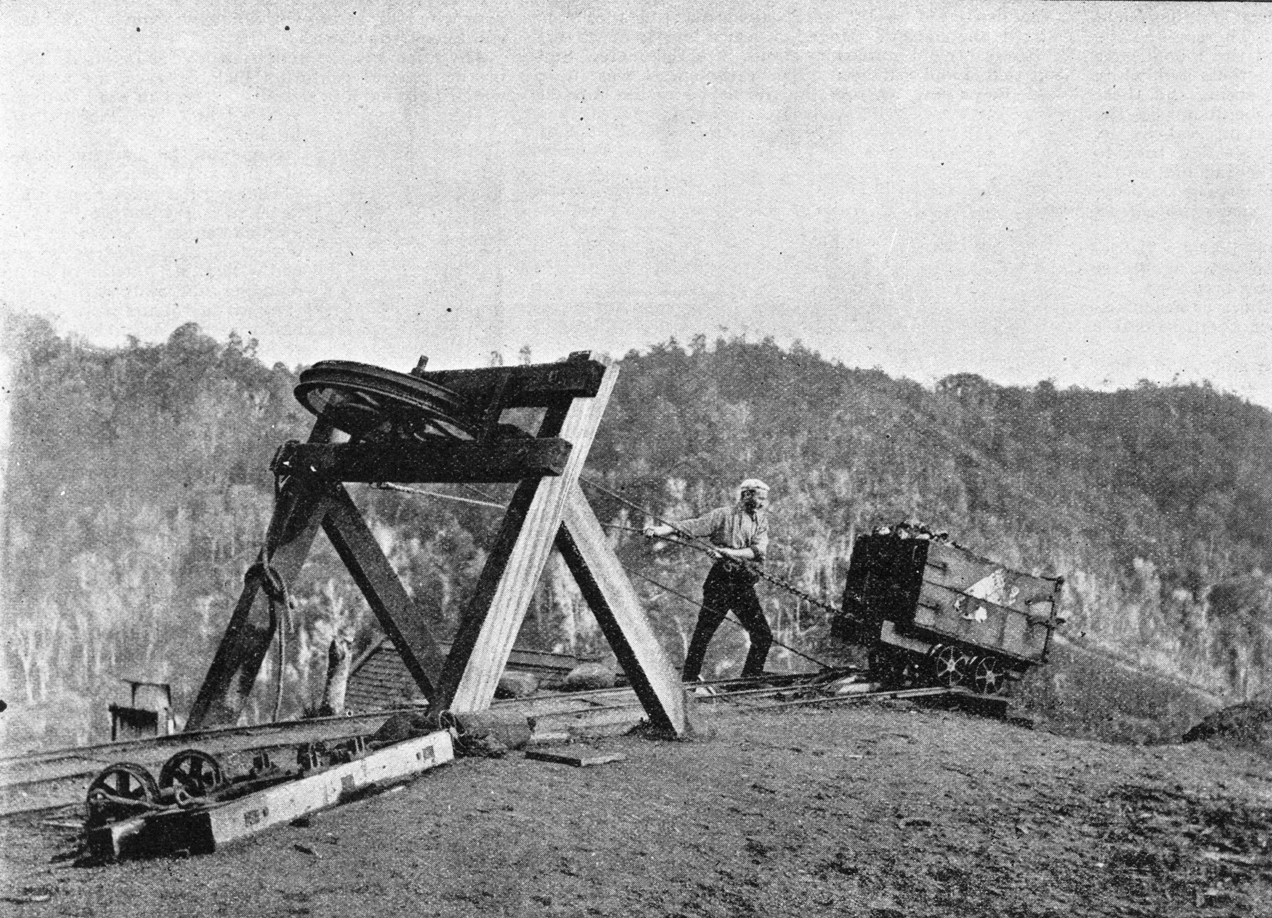
Brake frame for lowering quartz trucks at the Try Fluke Mine

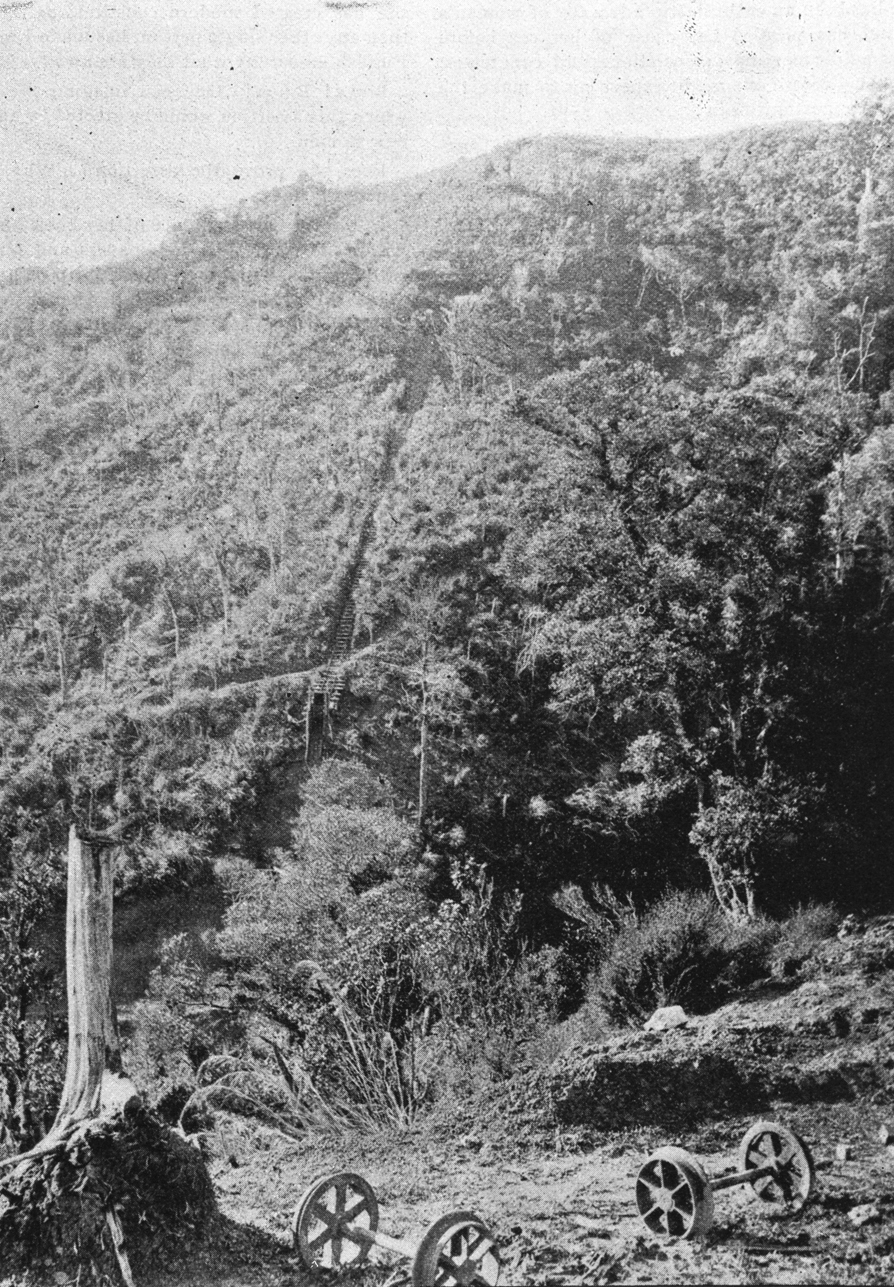
Mariposa section of the Try Fluke Mine

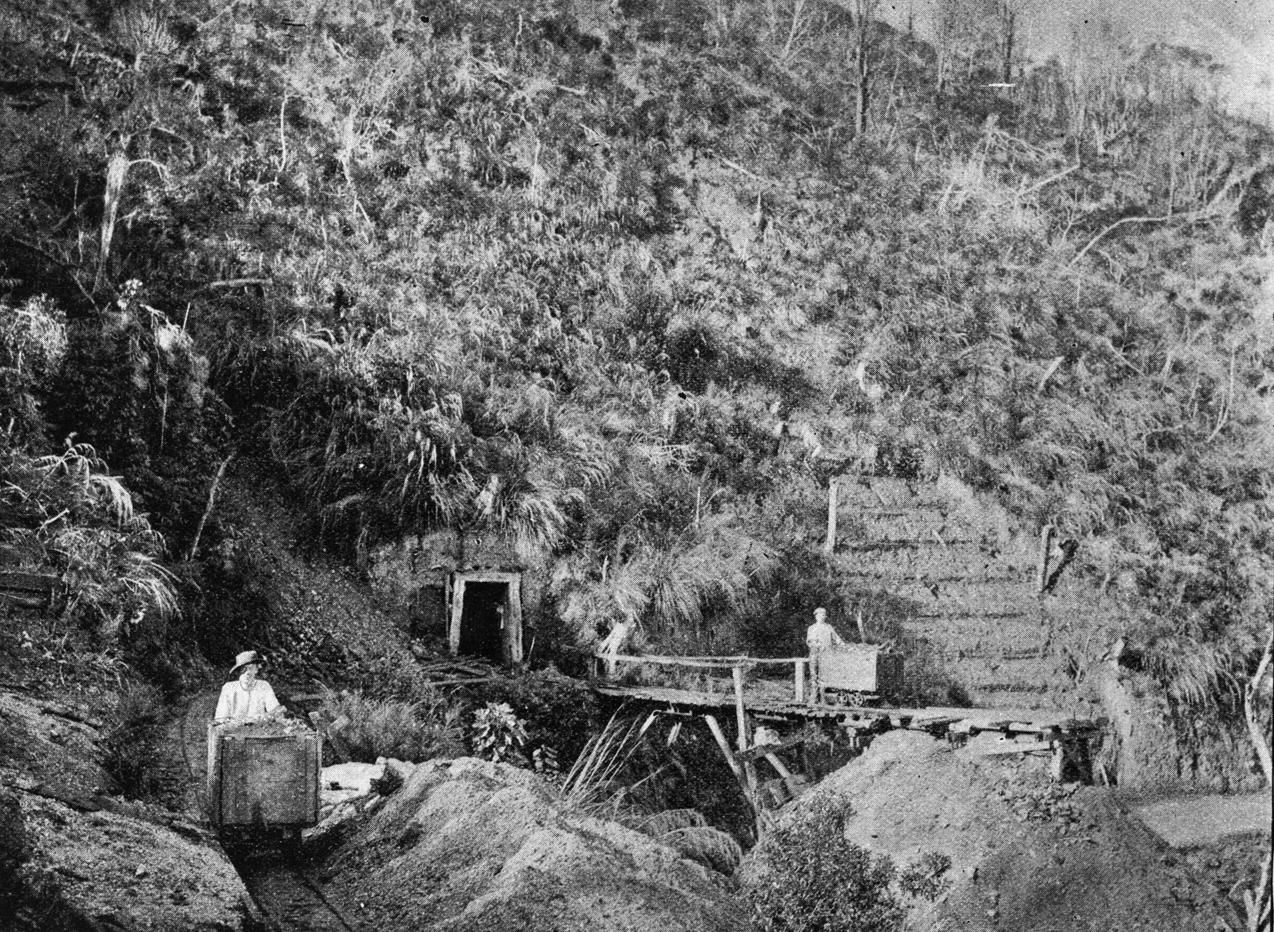
No, 2 drive at the Try Fluke Mine near Kuaotunu in the 1890s

The mine consisted of several vertical shafts and horizontal tunnels, also known as adits or drives, down the hill side. It is still possible to explore some of these drives. One of them runs 50 m into the mountain, ending at a filled-in shaft. In front of the mine is a flat strip of ground, where mining railway used to run. More than 2760 ounces of gold have been extracted by January 1893, after implementing the Cassel cyanide process, by which the level of gold recoverable was increased from 55% to 95%. Official production data by the Thames Mines show a yield of 2,327,619 oz bullion with a value of NZ$845 mio.

== Logging ==
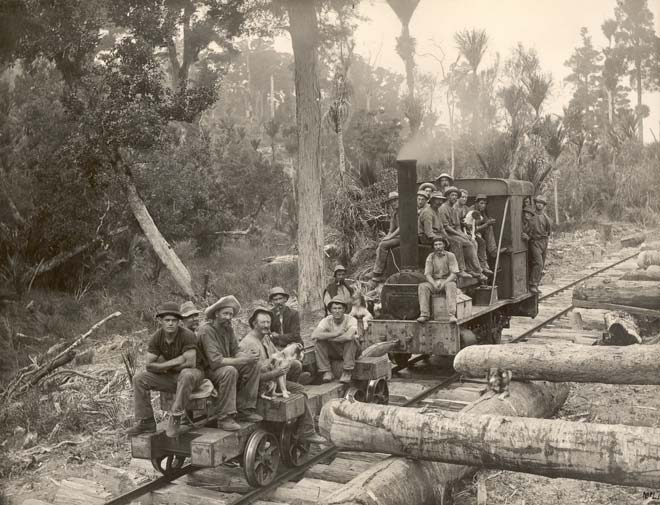
Bushmen and their dogs travel by a logging train to the work site near Kuaotunu

Logging played only a secondary role in the area, but mines needed kauri timber both for construction and for heating the ore ovens. Local loggers thus operated a narrow gauge logging railway including a small steam engine.

The locomotive with a gauge of probably 2 ft 6 in (762 mm) had been imported from Manning, Wardle & Co in Hunslet, England with works number 859 from 1883. As the 6 kilometres (3.7 mi) long line was flat and had no or little sidings, the empty log bogies were normally pushed out into the bush and pulled back after loading them with logs. This procedure reduced the risk of derailments of the loaded bogies, because pulling caused less derailments than pushing.

The Kūaotunu bush contained approximately 6 mio super feet of timber. E.H. Irving worked it from 1907 to 1909 as a contractor to the Kauri Timber Company (KTC). He and his bushmen felled and transported the logs to the Whangapoua Harbour estuary, where they were dumped, made up into rafts, and towed by powerful steamer to a KTC sawmill.

== Church ==
A church, St Columcille's, was built in 1893, when the town had approximately 2,000 inhabitants. The church cost 100 pounds to build, and was inaugurated free of debt. The material for the Roman Catholic Church at Kūaotunu arrived in January 1893 by ship, and was carted from the beach to the site near to the public school is. The building was disassembled in 1954 and re-erected at Tairua.
