= Selwyn Huts =

- Rural settlement
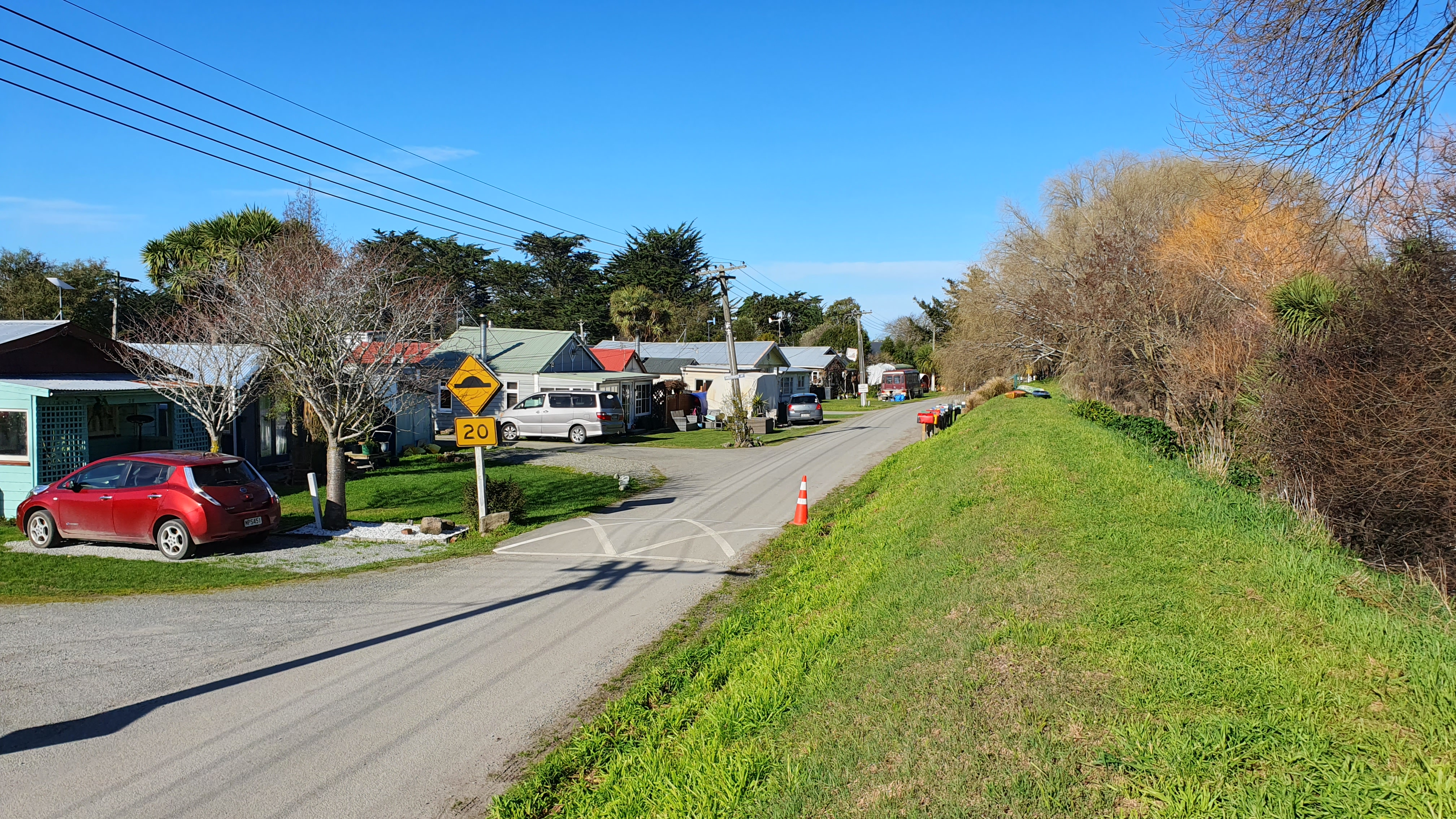
- Selwyn Huts in August 2023
- Interactive map of Selwyn Huts
- Coordinates: 43.716°S 172.441°E
- Country: New Zealand
- Region: Canterbury
- Territorial authority: Selwyn District
- Ward: Ellesmere
- Electorates: Selwyn; Te Tai Tonga (Māori)

Government
  - Territorial authority: Selwyn District Council
  - Regional council: Environment Canterbury
  - Mayor of Selwyn: Lydia Gliddon
  - Selwyn MP: Nicola Grigg
  - Te Tai Tonga MP: Tākuta Ferris

Area
  - Total: 0.13 km^{2} (0.050 sq mi)
- Elevation: 15 m (49 ft)

Population (June 2025)
  - Total: 90
  - Density: 690/km^{2} (1,800/sq mi)
- Time zone: UTC+12 (New Zealand Standard Time)
  - Summer (DST): UTC+13 (New Zealand Daylight Time)
- Area code: 03

Selwyn Huts, also called Upper Selwyn Huts, is a rural settlement close to the northern shore of Lake Ellesmere / Te Waihora in the Selwyn District of New Zealand. Lower Selwyn Huts is a smaller settlement 2.8 km further south.

The settlement consists of private dwellings on public land, and has existed since 1895. Residents pay an annual licensing fee for use of the land.

Selwyn District Council warned in 2019 that it intended to evict the residents within the next 20 years, partly due to threats from climate change. Hut owners were also expected to pay 30 percent of the $4 million wastewater upgrade. In 2024, the council put the eviction process on hold while further discussion was held with the residents. In 2026, the council gave the residents a 30-year Deed of Licence. It also agreed that the water upgrade would be included in the district rates. Lower Selwyn Huts have a 10-year notice to leave.

Lower Selwyn Huts was affected by flooding in 2021. Upper Selwyn Huts was affected by flooding in 2025.

== Demographics ==
Selwyn Huts is described as a rural settlement by Stats NZ. It covers 0.13 km^{2} (0.050 sq mi) and had an estimated population of 90 as of June 2025, with a population density of 692 people per km^{2}. Selwyn Huts is part of the Irwell statistical area.

Historical population
Year	Pop.	±% p.a.
2006	81	—
2013	60	−4.20%
2018	90	+8.45%
2023	93	+0.66%

Selwyn Huts had a population of 93 in the 2023 New Zealand census, an increase of 3 people (3.3%) since the 2018 census, and an increase of 33 people (55.0%) since the 2013 census. There were 51 males, 45 females, and 3 people of other genders in 60 dwellings. 3.2% of people identified as LGBTIQ+. The median age was 59.3 years (compared with 38.1 years nationally). There were 9 people (9.7%) aged under 15 years, 6 (6.5%) aged 15 to 29, 48 (51.6%) aged 30 to 64, and 33 (35.5%) aged 65 or older.

People could identify as more than one ethnicity. The results were 96.8% European (Pākehā), 9.7% Māori, and 6.5% other, which includes people giving their ethnicity as "New Zealander". English was spoken by 100.0%, Māori by 3.2%, and other languages by 6.5%. The percentage of people born overseas was 16.1, compared with 28.8% nationally.

The sole religious affiliation given was 32.3% Christian. People who answered that they had no religion were 61.3%, and 6.5% of people did not answer the census question.

Of those at least 15 years old, 12 (14.3%) people had a bachelor's or higher degree, 42 (50.0%) had a post-high school certificate or diploma, and 33 (39.3%) people exclusively held high school qualifications. The median income was $25,600, compared with $41,500 nationally. The employment status of those at least 15 was 24 (28.6%) full-time, 6 (7.1%) part-time, and 6 (7.1%) unemployed.

== See also ==
- Milford Huts
