= Doyleston =

- Rural settlement
- Interactive map of Doyleston
- Coordinates: 43°45′S 172°18′E
- Country: New Zealand
- Region: Canterbury
- Territorial authority: Selwyn District
- Ward: Ellesmere
- Electorates: Selwyn; Te Tai Tonga (Māori)

Government
  - Territorial authority: Selwyn District Council
  - Regional council: Environment Canterbury
  - Mayor of Selwyn: Lydia Gliddon
  - Selwyn MP: Nicola Grigg
  - Te Tai Tonga MP: Tākuta Ferris

Area
  - Total: 0.60 km^{2} (0.23 sq mi)
- Elevation: 15 m (49 ft)

Population (June 2025)
  - Total: 360
  - Density: 600/km^{2} (1,600/sq mi)
- Time zone: UTC+12 (New Zealand Standard Time)
  - Summer (DST): UTC+13 (New Zealand Daylight Time)
- Area code: 03

Doyleston is a minor Canterbury town in the South Island of New Zealand. It was named after Joseph Hastings Doyle, a publican from Christchurch who moved to the locality. Doyleston promised to be one of the main townships in the Ellesmere area, but before long Leeston overtook it and some businesses moved there. Doyleston had a school for many years, but it consolidated with Leeston School in the late 1930s.

Doyleston featured a hall on the main street (the second on the site), but partly due to a car crash it was pulled down, making way for new housing. Doyleston's main attraction now is Osborne Park, which has been the centre for junior football in Ellesmere for a number of years.

== Demographics ==
Doyleston is described as a rural settlement by Stats NZ. It covers 0.60 km^{2} (0.23 sq mi) and had an estimated population of 360 as of June 2025, with a population density of 600 people per km^{2}. Doyleston is part of the Irwell statistical area.

Historical population
Year	Pop.	±% p.a.
2006	249	—
2013	309	+3.13%
2018	321	+0.76%
2023	348	+1.63%

Doyleston had a population of 348 in the 2023 New Zealand census, an increase of 27 people (8.4%) since the 2018 census, and an increase of 39 people (12.6%) since the 2013 census. There were 177 males and 171 females in 129 dwellings. 2.6% of people identified as LGBTIQ+. The median age was 40.6 years (compared with 38.1 years nationally). There were 75 people (21.6%) aged under 15 years, 45 (12.9%) aged 15 to 29, 180 (51.7%) aged 30 to 64, and 45 (12.9%) aged 65 or older.

People could identify as more than one ethnicity. The results were 94.0% European (Pākehā); 14.7% Māori; 3.4% Pasifika; 3.4% Asian; 0.9% Middle Eastern, Latin American and African New Zealanders (MELAA); and 1.7% other, which includes people giving their ethnicity as "New Zealander". English was spoken by 98.3%, Māori by 2.6%, Samoan by 0.9%, and other languages by 4.3%. No language could be spoken by 1.7% (e.g. too young to talk). New Zealand Sign Language was known by 0.9%. The percentage of people born overseas was 16.4, compared with 28.8% nationally.

Religious affiliations were 24.1% Christian, 0.9% Hindu, and 0.9% Buddhist. People who answered that they had no religion were 67.2%, and 6.9% of people did not answer the census question.

Of those at least 15 years old, 51 (18.7%) people had a bachelor's or higher degree, 144 (52.7%) had a post-high school certificate or diploma, and 75 (27.5%) people exclusively held high school qualifications. The median income was $51,100, compared with $41,500 nationally. 21 people (7.7%) earned over $100,000 compared to 12.1% nationally. The employment status of those at least 15 was 165 (60.4%) full-time, 30 (11.0%) part-time, and 9 (3.3%) unemployed.

== Notable people ==
- Laurel Amy Eva Campbell (1902–1971), racehorse trainer
