= Te Rau-o-te-Huia / Mount Donald McLean =

Hill in the Waitākere Ranges, New Zealand

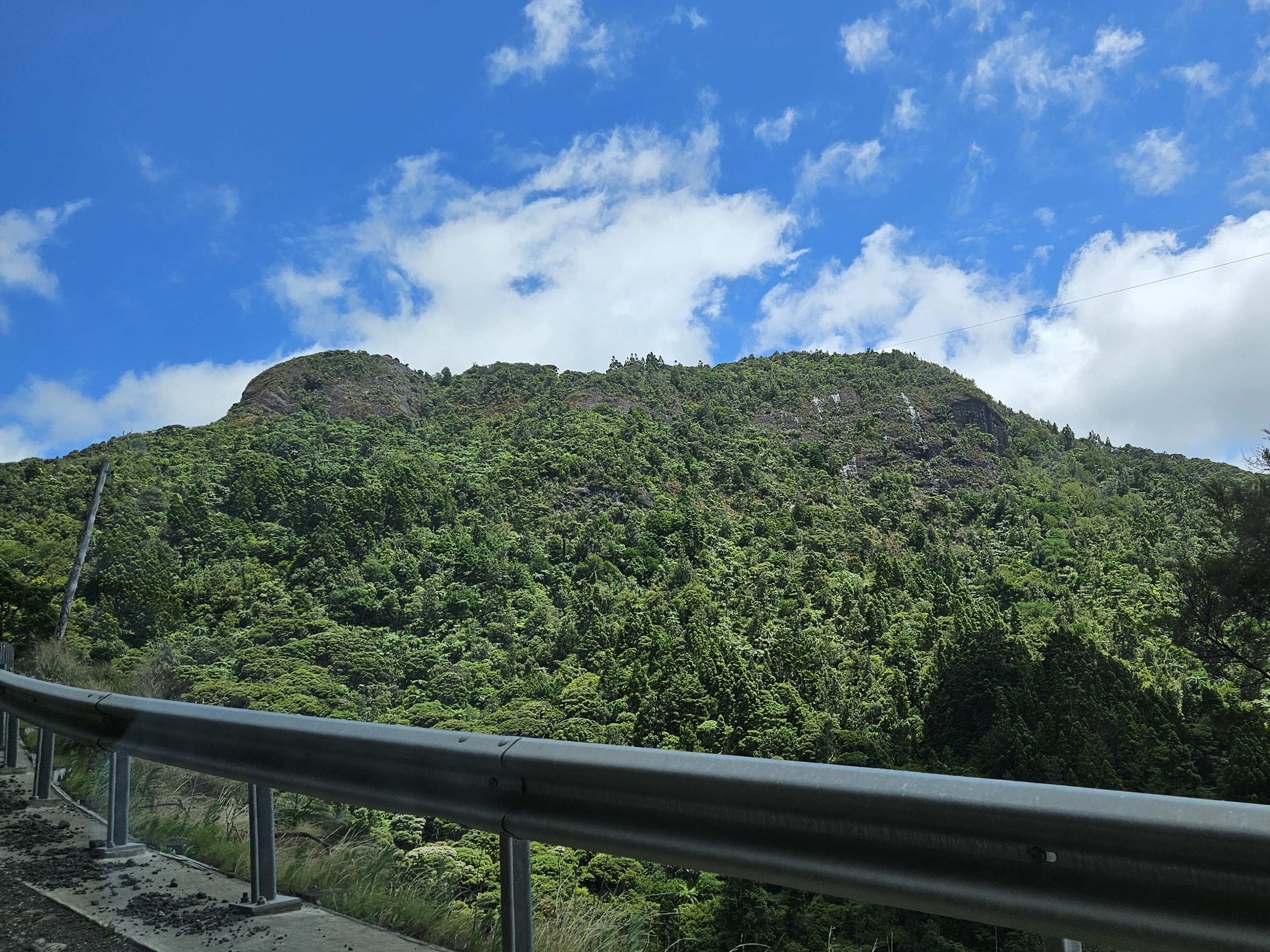
- View of Te Rau-o-te-Huia / Mount Donald McLean from Huia Road

Highest point
- Elevation: 389 m (1,276 ft)
- Coordinates: 37.01563°S 174.53980°E

Geography
- Location: North Island, New Zealand
- Parent range: Waitākere Ranges

Geology
- Rock age: Miocene

Te Rau-o-te-Huia / Mount Donald McLean is a hill in the Waitākere Ranges of the Auckland Region of New Zealand's North Island. It is located to the south of the ranges, near the township of Huia. It is the highest peak of the Waitākere Ranges that borders the Manukau Harbour.

== Geography and geology ==
The hill is a 389 m (1,276 ft) peak in the Waitākere Ranges, approximately 2 km (1.2 mi) northwest from Little Huia. The hill is the source for the south-flowing Baker Stream, and some of the tributaries of the east-flowing Marama Stream. The hill is accessible by Mt Donald McLean Road along Whatipu Road, or by two walking tracks: the Puriri Ridge Track and the Donald McLean Track. A prominent viewing platform can be found at the summit, from which Mount Taranaki can be seen on a clear day.

Te Rau-o-te-Huia / Mount Donald McLean is a part of the Waitākere volcano, which first began erupting 23 million years ago, during the Miocene era. Most of the volcano had eroded by five million years ago, except for the eastern slopes of the volcano, which were uplifted from the ocean floor and form the modern Waitākere Ranges.

== Biodiversity ==
The hill is vegetated with native bush, including kauri, rimu, nīkau, tōtara, tānekaha, lancewood and rewarewa. The hill is also a habitat for the rare Waitākere rock koromiko Veronica bishopiana and Hall's tōtara, Podocarpus laetus.

== History ==
Te Rau-o-te-Huia / Mount Donald McLean is within the traditional rohe of the Te Kawerau ā Maki iwi, and overlooked a number of kāinga around Huia Bay. The literal translation of Te Rau-o-te-Huia is "The Plumes of the Huia", and the name was used to describe both the mountain and the surrounding bay. The plumes were a metaphor for expressing his pride in the area.

In English, the hill was named after Donald McLean, a government administrator and major figure in Māori-Pākehā relations in the mid-19th Century. During the 1850s, the Gibbons family milled the kauri forest on the north side of Te Rau-o-te-Huia / Mount Donald McLean. Unintentional fires in the early 20th century led to large areas of the hill being deforested, with mānuka scrub propagating in the areas affected by fire.

The hill became popular with trampers by the 1930s, known as a place where Mount Taranaki could be seen on a clear day. In the late 1980s, the walking track to the summit was upgraded.

== Gallery ==
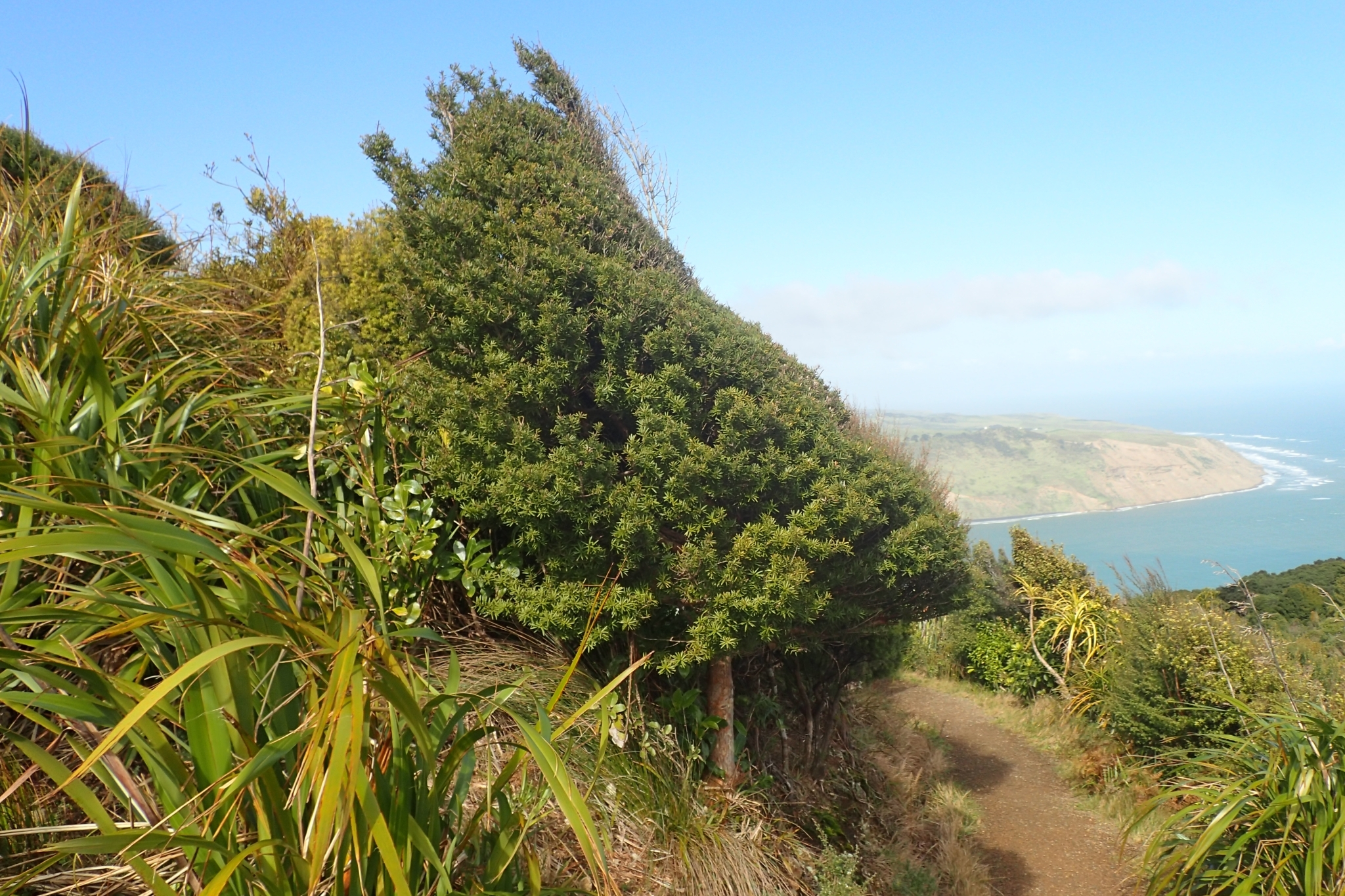
A windswept Hall's tōtara (Podocarpus laetus) on the slopes of Te Rau-o-te-Huia / Mount Donald McLean

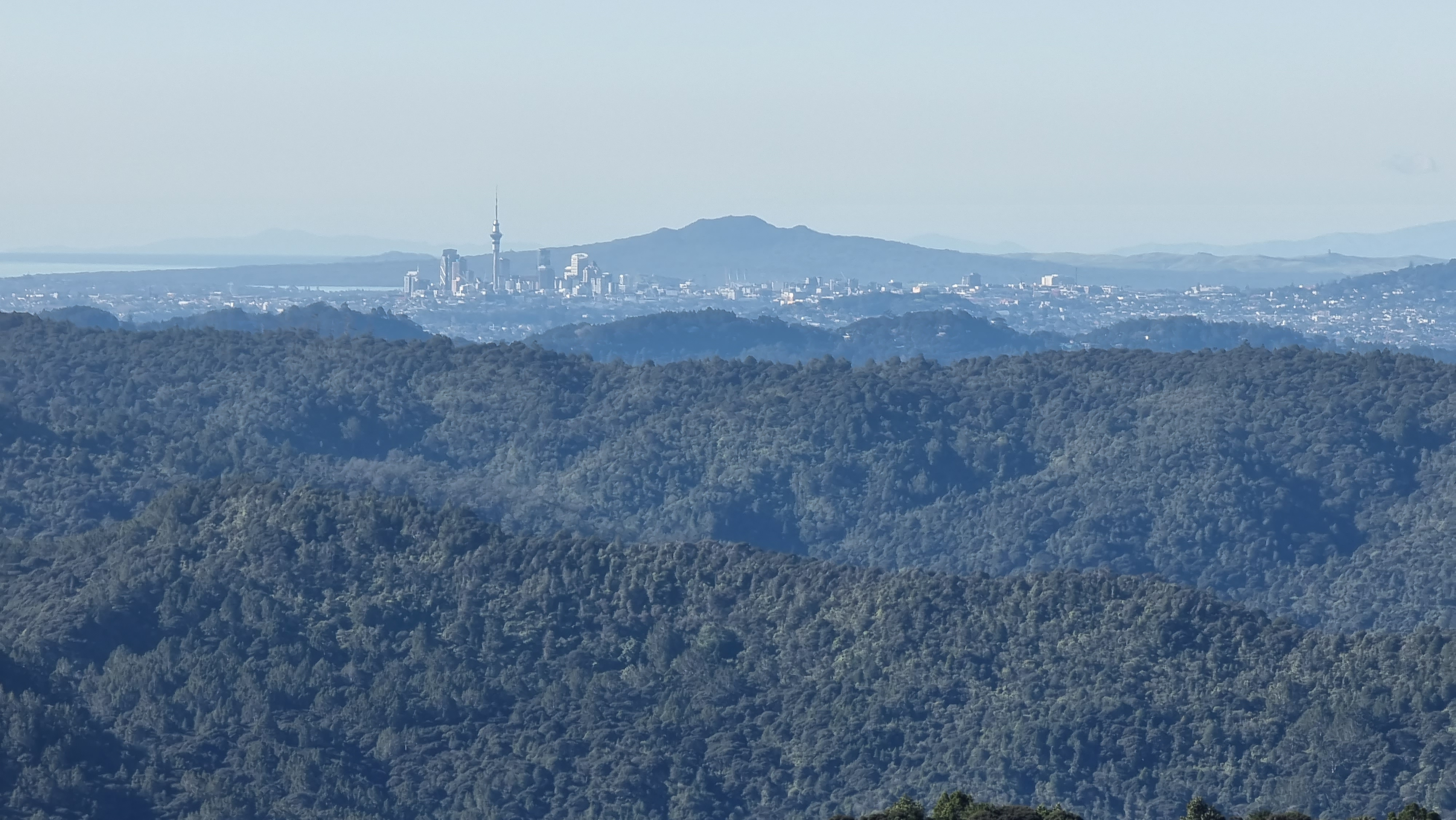
View from Te Rau-o-te-Huia / Mount Donald McLean towards the Auckland City Centre and Rangitoto

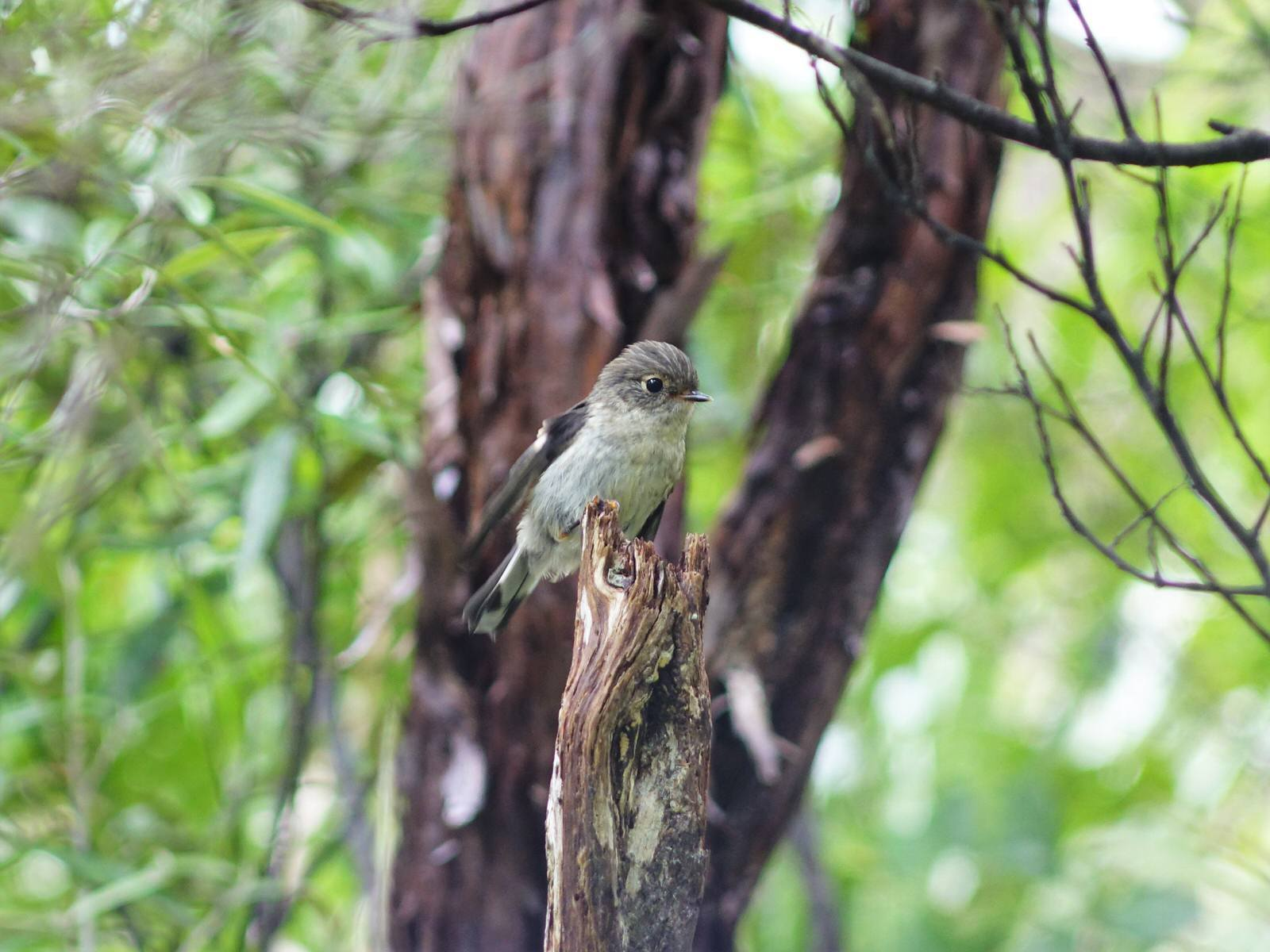
a tomtit (Petroica macrocephala) on Te Rau-o-te-Huia / Mount Donald McLean

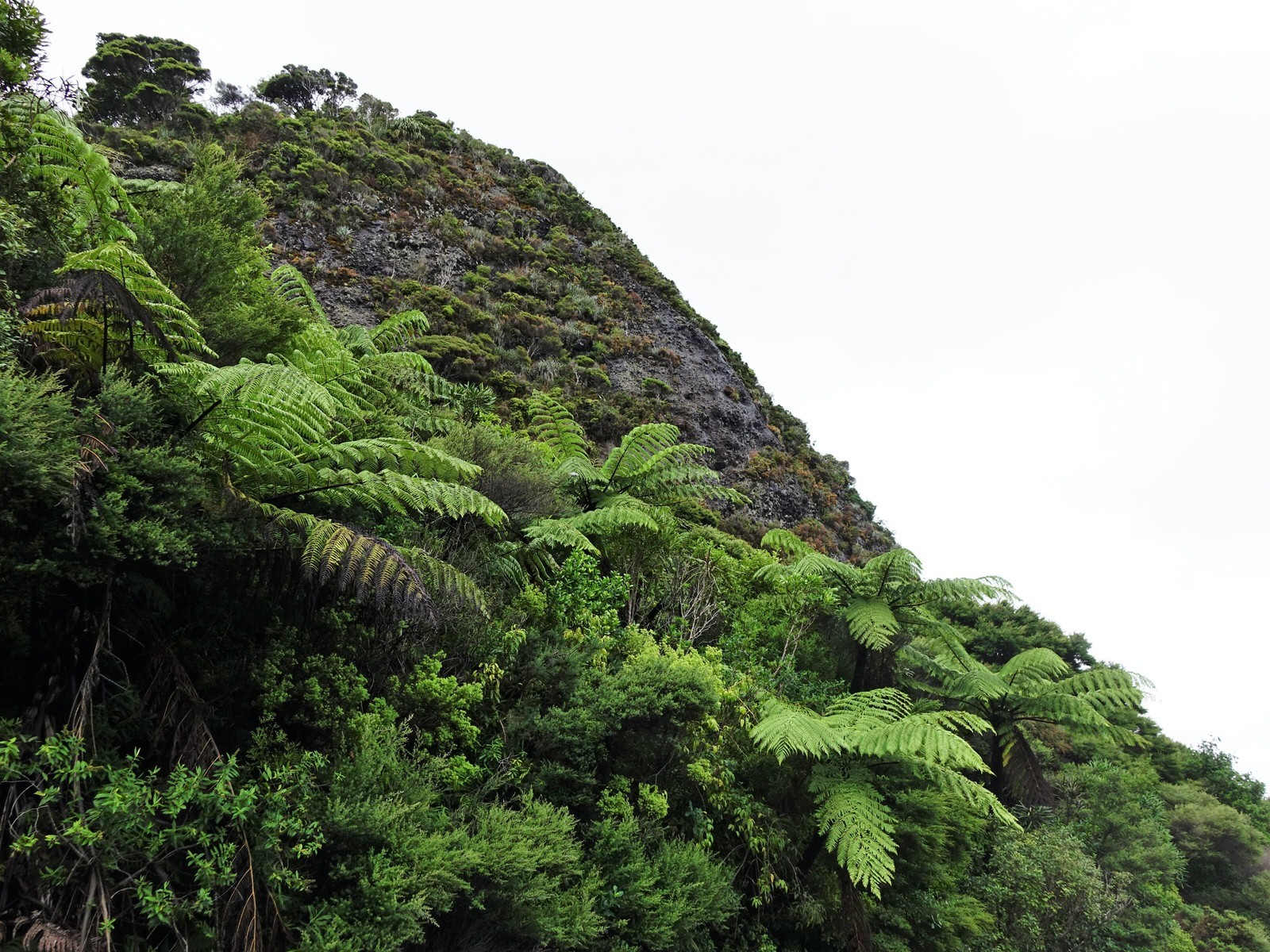
Cyathea medullaris on Te Rau-o-te-Huia / Mount Donald McLean

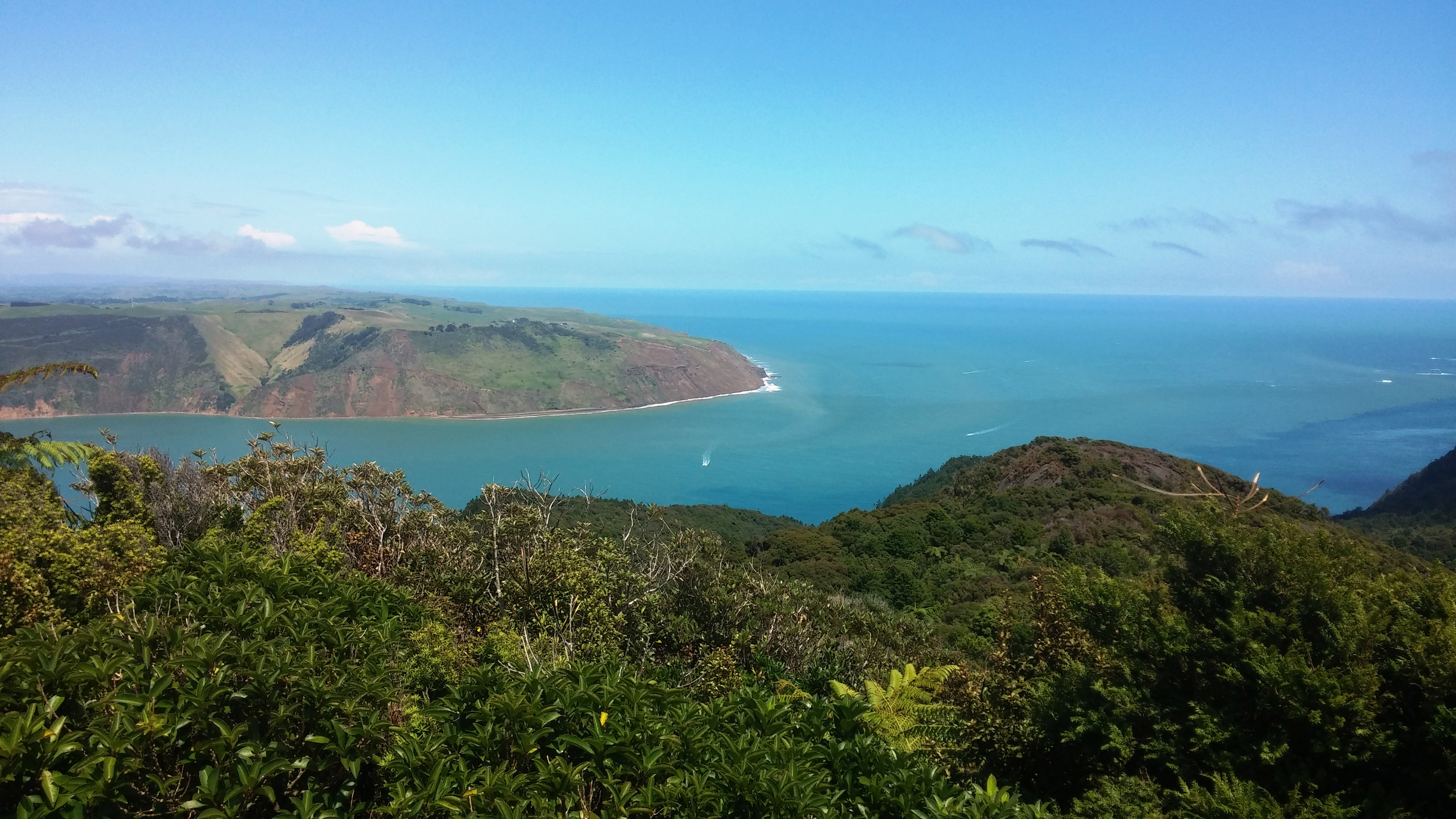
View over Manukau Harbour from the lookout

== Bibliography ==
- Diamond, John T.; Hayward, Bruce W. (1979). The Māori history and legends of the Waitākere Ranges. The Lodestar Press. ISBN 9781877431210.
