= Ruaotuwhenua =

Hill in the Waitākere Ranges, New Zealand

- Rua ō Te Whenua
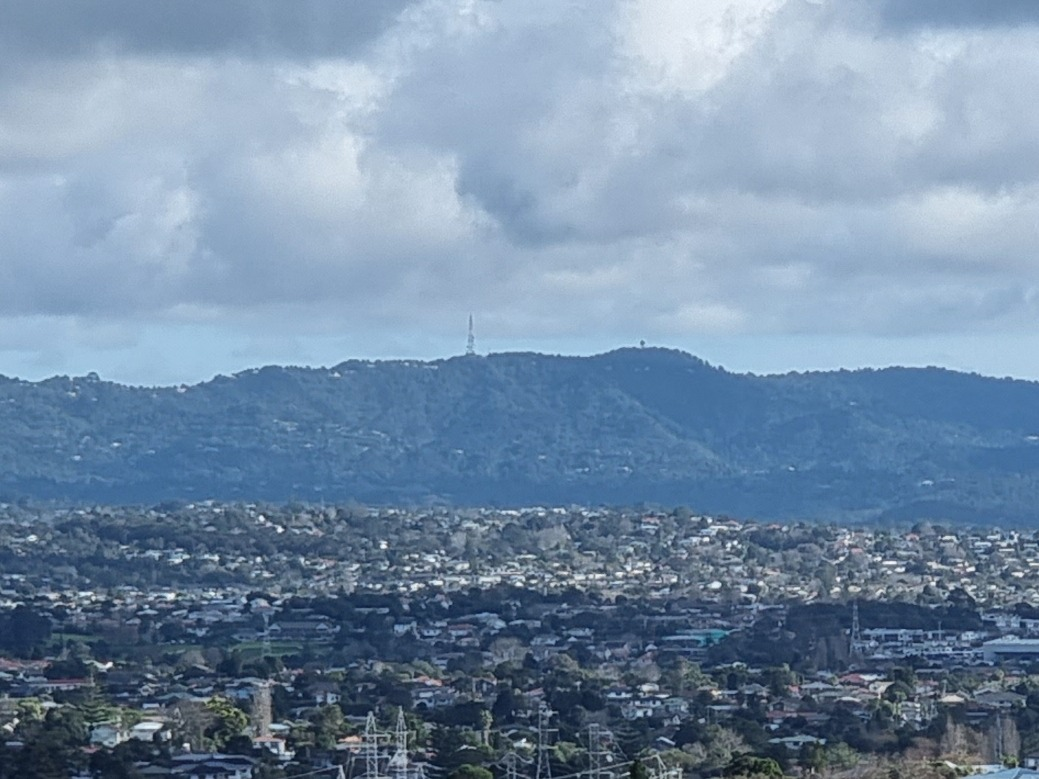
- Ruaotuwhenua seen from Puketāpapa.

Highest point
- Elevation: 440 m (1,440 ft)
- Coordinates: 36.924293°S 174.552759°E

Geography
- Location: North Island, New Zealand
- Parent range: Waitākere Ranges

Geology
- Rock age: Miocene

Ruaotuwhenua is a hill in the Waitākere Ranges of the Auckland Region of New Zealand's North Island. At 440 metres (1,440 ft), it is one of the tallest of the Waitākere Ranges, and the tallest of the eastern ranges adjacent to Auckland. The peak is the location of an air traffic radar and a radio mast is located further down the slope of the hill in Waiatarua.

== Geology ==
Ruaotuwhenua, along with the Scenic Drive ridge, are the remnants of one of the eastern sides of the Waitākere Volcano, a Miocene era volcanic crater complex which was uplifted from the seafloor between 3 and 5 million years ago.

== Geography ==
The hill is a 440-metre (1,440 ft) peak in the eastern Waitākere Ranges. It is located near the settlement of Waiatarua, and is accessible by Scenic Drive. The northern side of the hill is the source for Stoney Creek, a tributary of the Opanuku Stream, while the south-eastern side is a source for the Mander Creek, a tributary of the Nihotupu Stream which flows into the Upper Nihotupu Reservoir and Big Muddy Creek.

== History ==
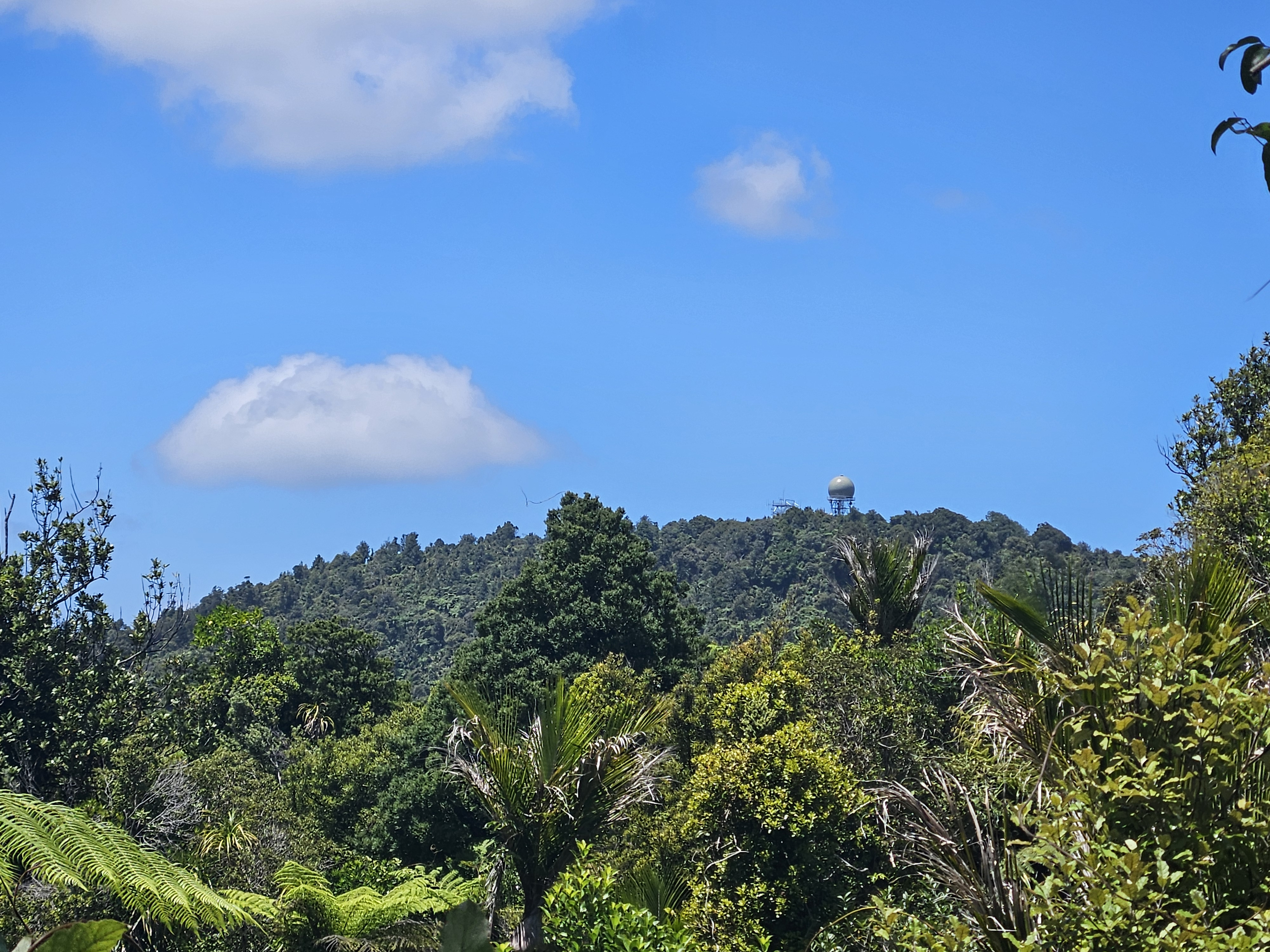
The radome station seen from Old Coach Road

Ruaotuwhenua is within the traditional rohe of the Te Kawerau ā Maki iwi, and holds significant cultural and spiritual significance. "Rua ō Te Whenua" literally means "the rumble of the earth", and is likely a reference to the roaring sound of the surf which travels along the Nihotupu Valley.

The hill is linked to the Te Kawerau ā Maki traditional story of Panuku and Parekura. The story involves Nihotupu, a tūrehu (supernatural being) who lived in a cave at Ruaotuwhenua, who kidnapped Panuku's wife Parekura. Panuku travelled to Nihotupu's cave home to rescue his wife. Many of the place names in the eastern Waitākere Ranges area reference this traditional legend.

The hill was regarded as the highest point of the Waitākere Ranges until the early 1940s, when city waterworks engineer AD Mead located and measured the height of Te Toiokawharu.

In the late 1960s, a radome and VHF transmission station was constructed on the hill, providing radio monitoring for Auckland Airport.

== Panorama ==
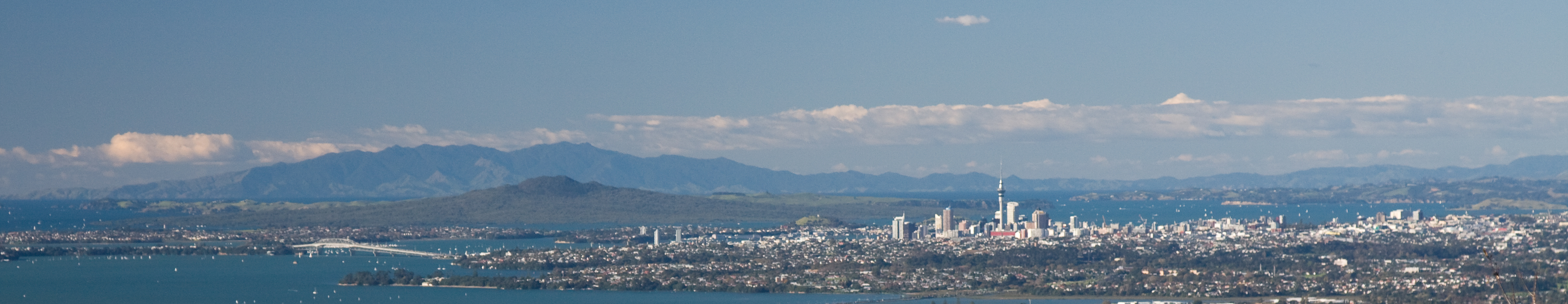
Panorama of Auckland, seen from the lookout east of Ruaotuwhenua.
