= Fairy Falls (New Zealand) =

Waterfall in the Auckland Region, New Zealand

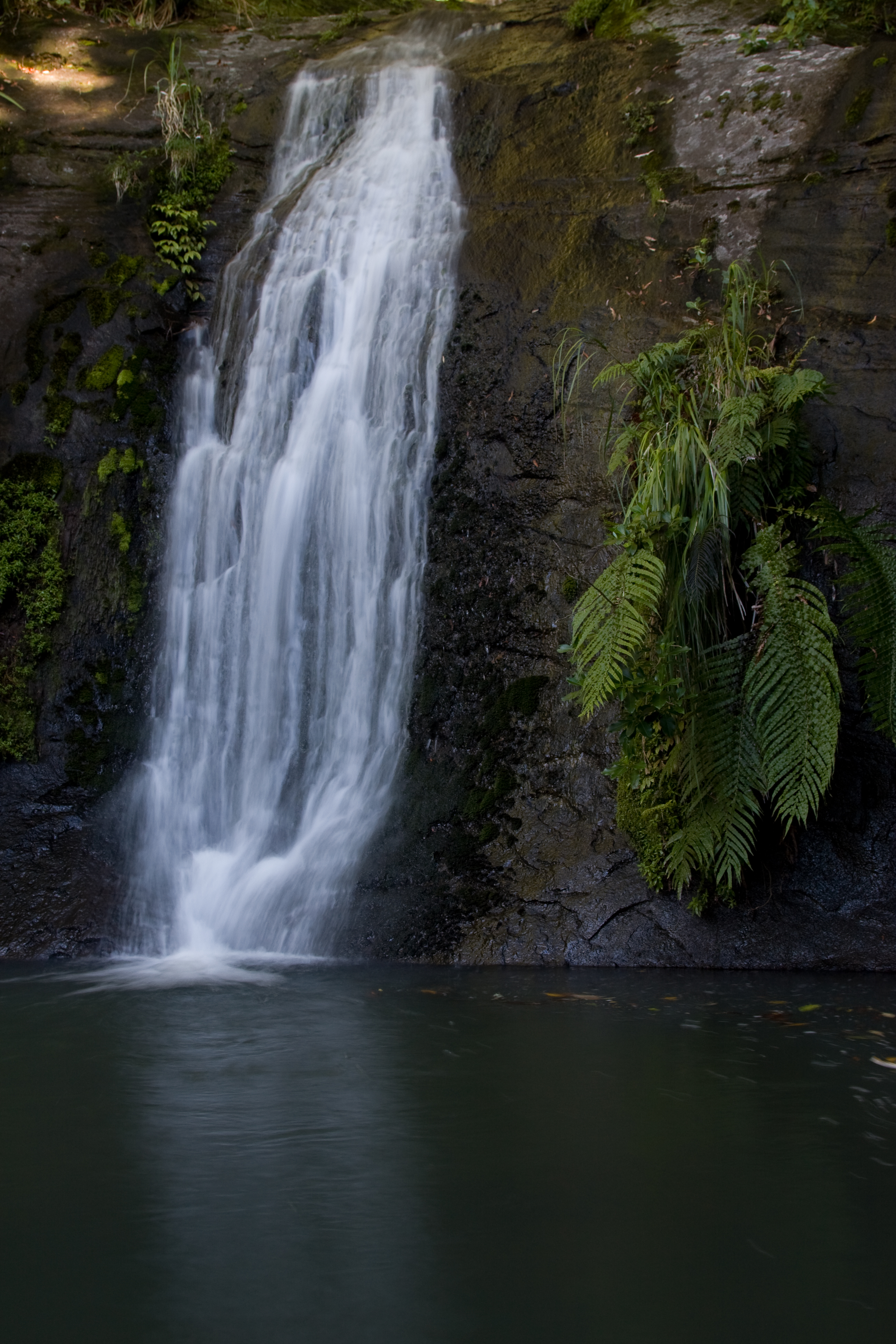
- Lower section of the Fairy Falls in 2010
- Interactive map of Fairy Falls
- Location: Waitākere Ranges
- Coordinates: 36°54′51″S 174°33′20″E
- Total height: 15 metres (49 ft)

The Fairy Falls is a waterfall in the eastern Waitākere Ranges of Auckland, New Zealand.

== Geography ==
The falls are a part of the Fairy Falls Stream, a stream that flows northeast towards the Stony Creek. The creek is a tributary of the Ōpanuku Stream, which flows into the Waitematā Harbour at Te Wai-o-Pareira / Henderson Creek.

== Access and recreational activities ==
The waterfall is accessible by the Fairy Falls track, accessible from Scenic Drive. This track was closed in 2018 due to the threat of kauri dieback, and later by the effects of Cyclone Gabrielle in February 2023. As of September 2024, the majority of the track is open - taking walkers from the car park on Scenic Drive to the bottom of the falls. Access from Mountain Road remains closed.

== See also ==
- List of waterfalls
- List of waterfalls in New Zealand
