= Pukematekeo =

Hill in the Waitākere Ranges, New Zealand

- McElwain Lookout
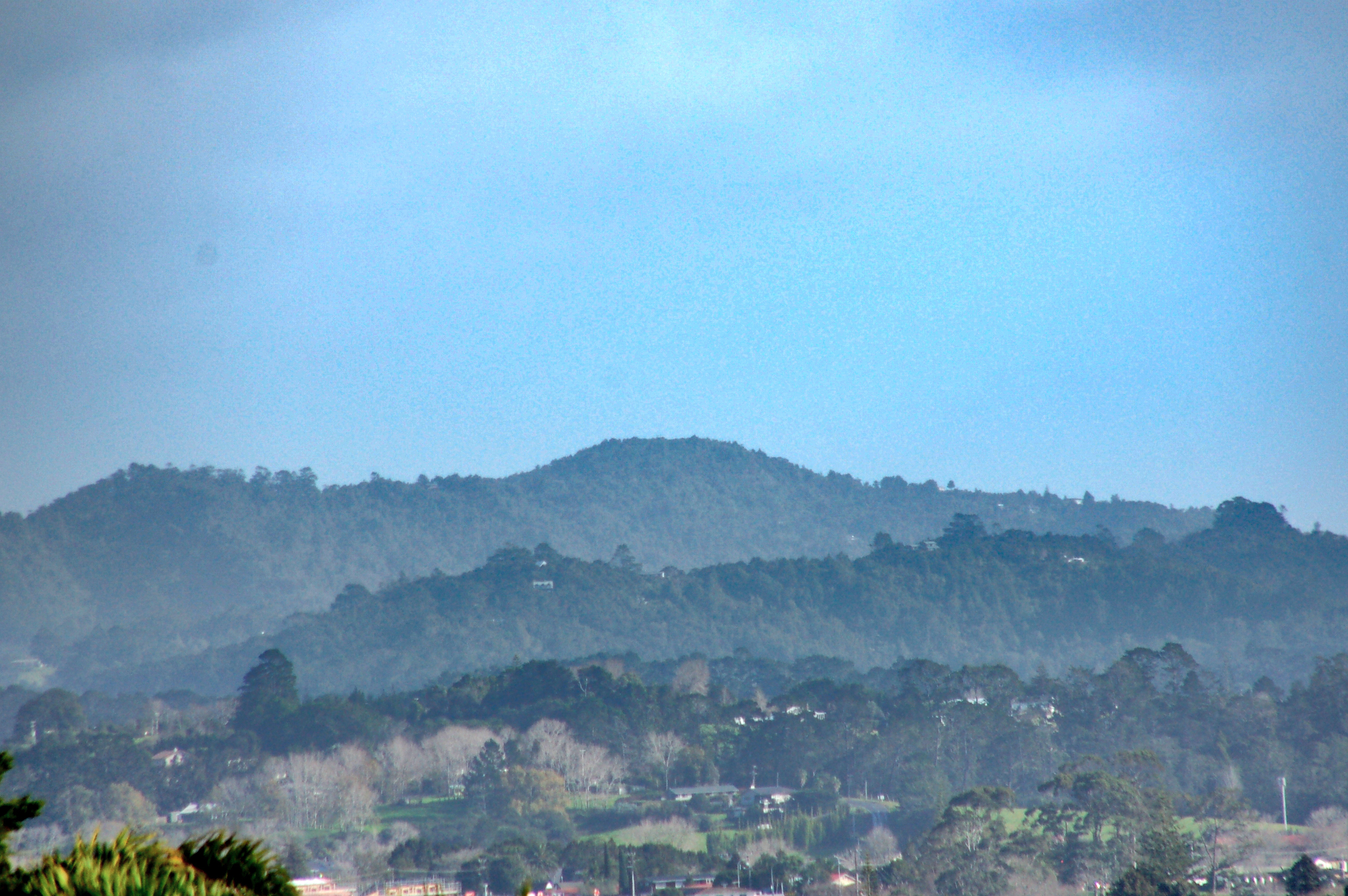
- Pukematekeo seen from Glen Eden

Highest point
- Elevation: 336 m (1,102 ft)
- Coordinates: 36.88344°S 174.53835°E

Geography
- Location: North Island, New Zealand
- Parent range: Waitākere Ranges

Geology
- Rock age: Miocene

Pukematekeo is a hill in the Waitākere Ranges of the Auckland Region of New Zealand's North Island. It is located west of Henderson, and is the northernmost hill in the Waitākere Ranges Regional Park.

== Description ==
The hill is a 336-metre peak in the Waitākere Ranges, and is the northern-most hill in the ranges. The hill is the source for two river systems: the Kumeū River, which flows north to meet the Kaipara River and eventually flows into the Kaipara Harbour, and the Cassel Stream, which flows eastwards to join the Swanson Stream, which flows into Te Wai-o-Pareira / Henderson Creek and the Waitematā Harbour.

The hill is accessible by Scenic Drive, and is a starting point for the Pukematekeo Track, a walking track linking the peak and the Waitākere Golf Club to the west.

== Geology ==
Pukematekeo is the remnant of one of the eastern vents of the Waitākere Volcano, a Miocene era volcanic crater complex which was uplifted from the seafloor between 3 and 5 million years ago. Pukematekeo consists of tilted andesite flows and volcanic litharenites. The 100 metre thick sequence is composed of at least 11 thin andesite flows, interspersed with pyroclastic deposits and lapilli tuffs.

== History ==
Pukematekeo is within the traditional rohe of the Te Kawerau ā Maki iwi, and holds significant cultural and spiritual significance. The name Pukematekeo in Māori is a geographical description, referring to how it is the final hill of the Waitākere Ranges. Pukematakeo was the site of a Te Kawerau ā Maki pā, one of only a few known in the inland Waitākere Ranges.

Pukematekeo was the location of Ebenezer Gibbons' kauri sawmill tramline, connecting the base of the hill to Swanson railway station. The sawmill and tramline operated between 1885 and 1888. The path of the tramline was later repurposed as Tram Valley Road in Swanson. Pioneering farmer Thomas George established a sheep farm with his family settled near Pukematekeo in the 1860s, however by the 1920s most of the pasture had been reforested by native bush.

The land around Pukematekeo was purchased from settlers by the Auckland City Council in 1926 through the Public Works Act, in order to create a scenic kauri forest reserve, which later formed a section of the greater Waitākere Ranges Regional Park. In 1928, a significant scrub fire damaged native forest on the eastern slopes of Pukematekeo.

On 10 June 1939, road access to Pukematekeo was first made possible, when an extension of Scenic Drive was opened between Waiatarua and Swanson.

== Gallery ==
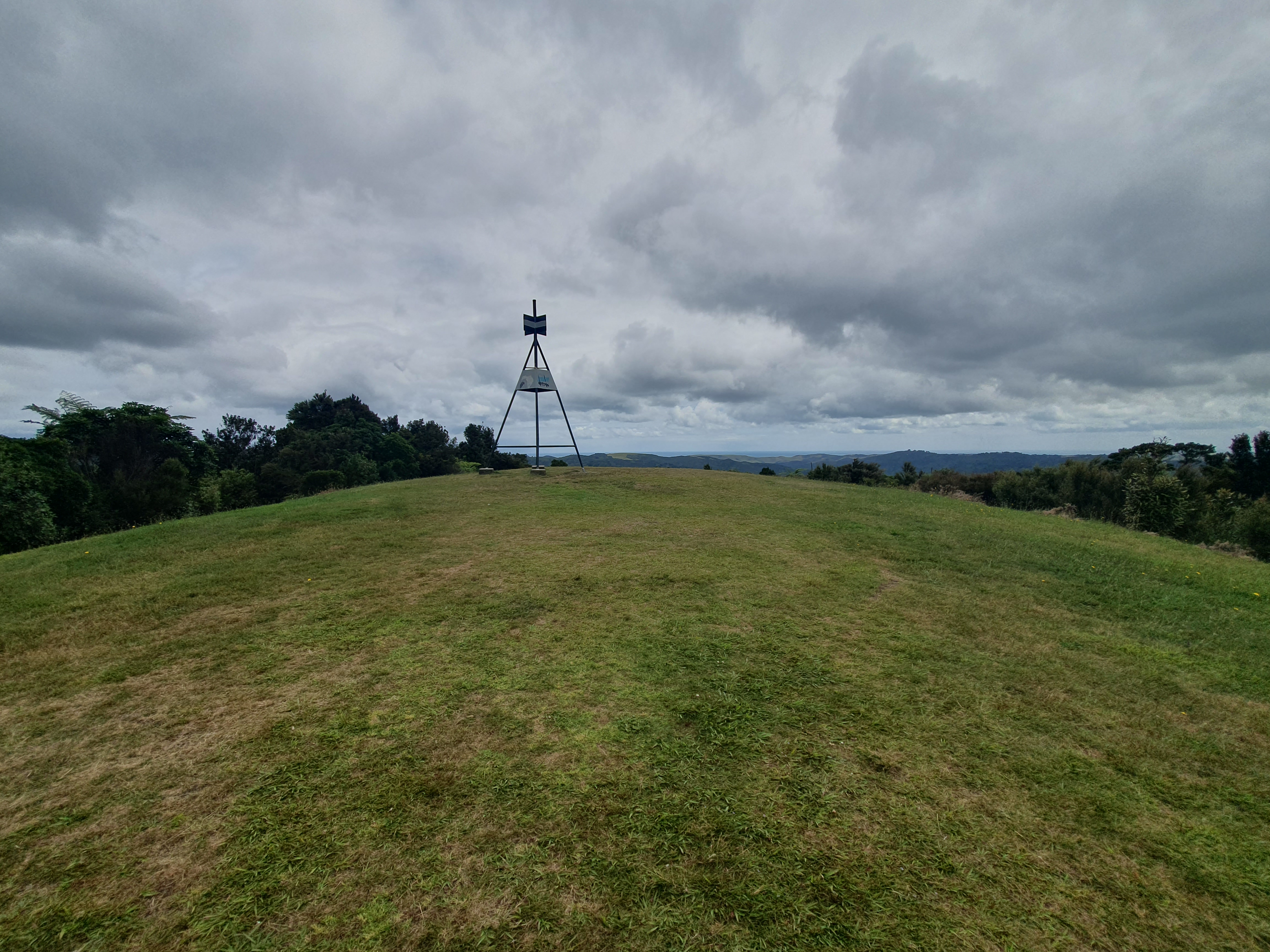
Trig station at the summit of Pukematekeo

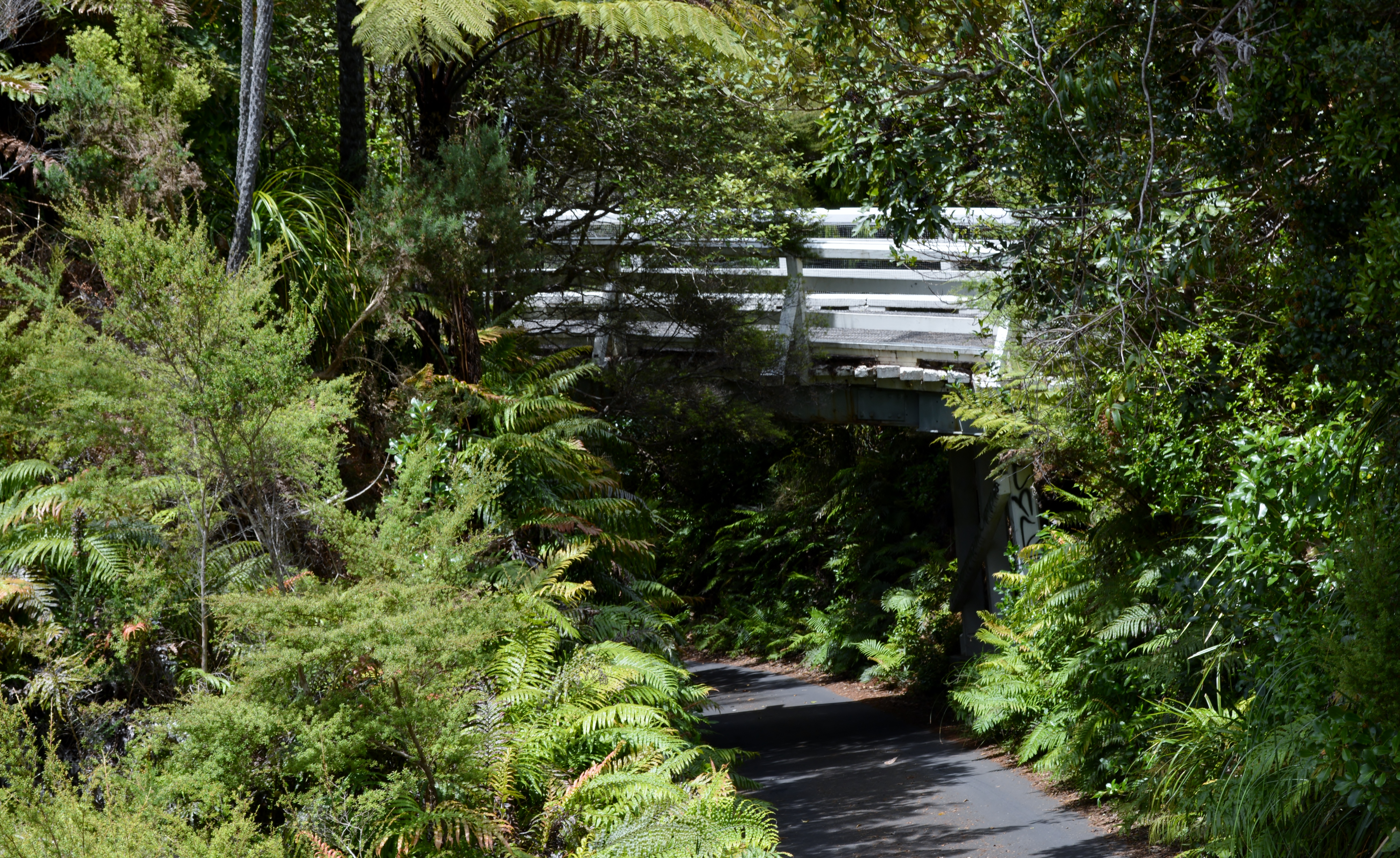
Isolated bridge and native flora at Pukematekeo

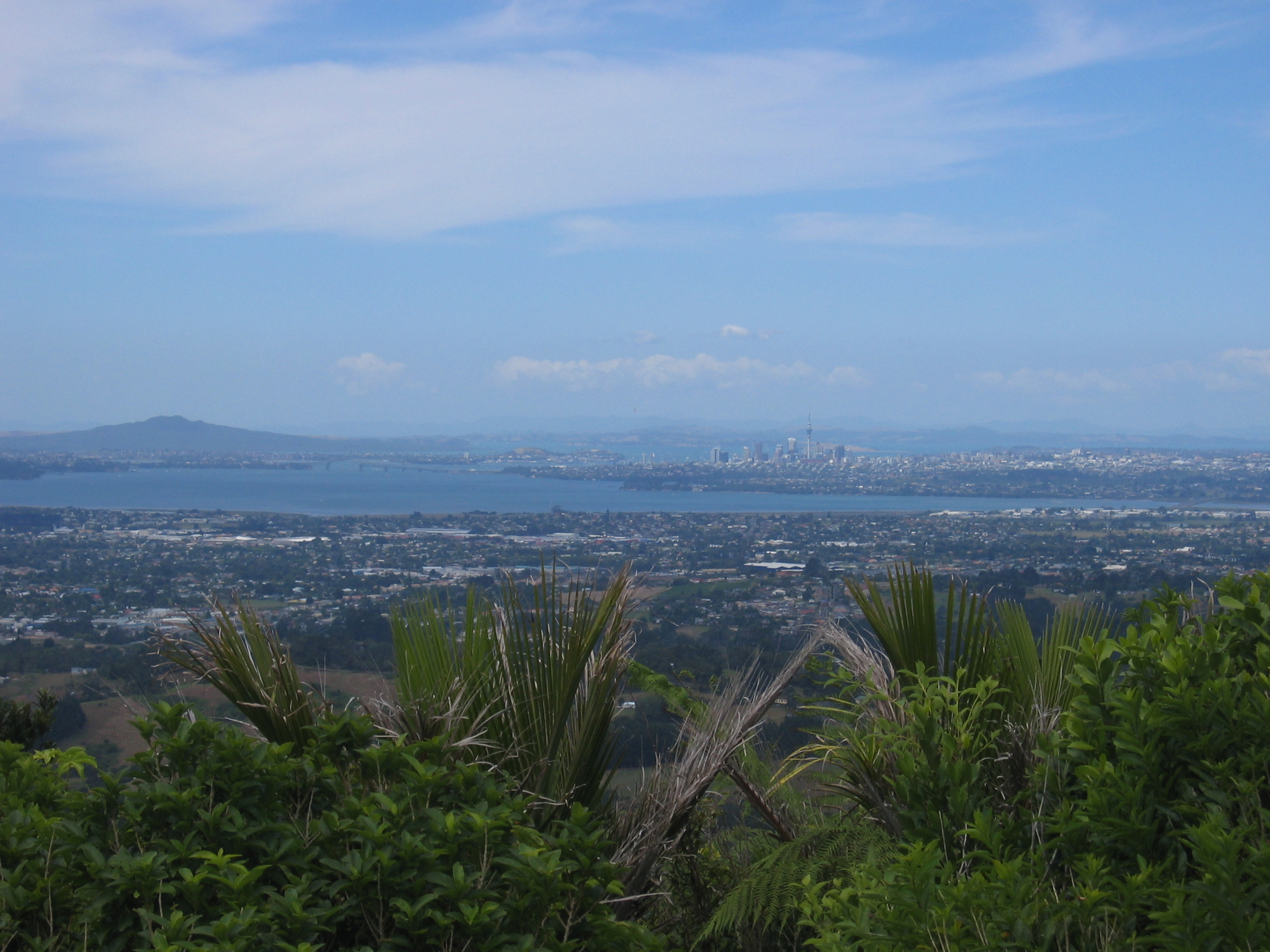
View of Auckland from Pukematekeo
