= Scenic Drive, Auckland =

Scenic Drive
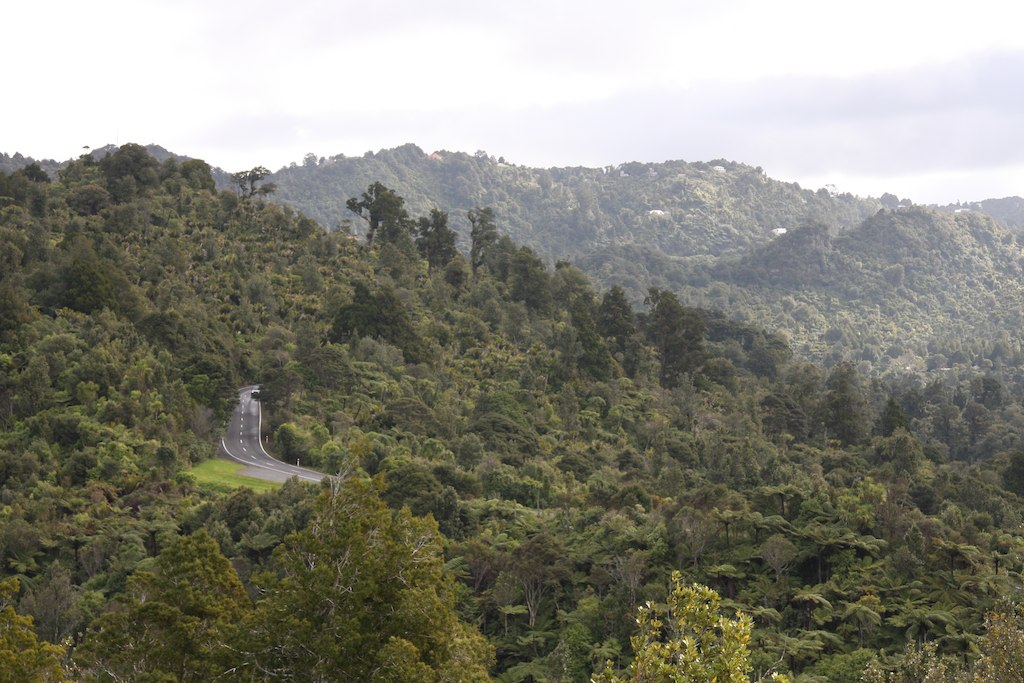
- A view of Scenic Drive in Titirangi
- Location: Titirangi
- Coordinates: 36°56′42.51″S 174°36′1.6″E

Scenic Drive is a road that runs through the bush-clad Waitākere Ranges from Titirangi to Swanson on the western outskirts of Auckland, New Zealand. It is part of Auckland urban route 24. As the name indicates, it is famous for the sweeping views over the western parts of the Auckland Region.

The road passes through the village of Waiatarua, but most of it is through native bush (forest), in Centennial Memorial Park or the neighbouring water catchment area. It connects with West Coast Road, Shaw Road, Konini Road and Piha Road to the surf beaches at Karekare and Piha. It is paralleled by the disused Exhibition Drive, now used by pedestrians & cyclists.

The Arataki Visitor Centre provides displays of the local flora, fauna and geology and well-maintained walking tracks. Along the parts of the road that pass through private land are a native-plant seller, several potters and a disused winery.

Large parts of the Waitākere Ranges are now closed to the public for hiking and walking to help stop the spread of the incurable Kauri dieback disease.

== Geography ==
The drive begins in the suburb of Titirangi, at the foothills of the Waitākere Ranges. It follows a path west, then north-west, to the township of Waiatarua, located near Ruaotuwhenua and other high points of the eastern Waitākere Ranges. At Waiatarua, Piha Road splits from Scenic Drive, allowing access to Piha and Karekare beaches and their coastal communities. The road continues north-west, forming much of the border between Henderson Valley farmland and the Waitākere Ranges Regional Park. After passing the Pukematekeo Lookout, Scenic Drive descends from the ranges, ending at the suburb of Swanson.

The Scenic Drive ridge are the remnants of the eastern sides of a Miocene era Waitākere Volcano, which was uplifted from the seafloor between 3 and 5 million years ago.

== History ==
The road was first constructed in the 1910s, and opened in January 1914 as Exhibition Drive, coinciding with the 1913-14 Auckland Exhibition. Work on the road led to the development of Titirangi as a village, because of the need for lodgings for the labourers who worked on the road.

The road was later known as the Waitākere Scenic Drive, then later by the name Scenic Drive. Exhibition Drive was re-developed as Scenic Drive during the 1930s depression as a Schedule 5 project to provide work for the unemployed. It was intended to be a tourist route and assist with maintenance of the dams in the water catchment area. Subsequent urban sprawl has meant those small parts of the route not protected as reserve or for water catchment have prestige housing at the southern end, and life style blocks at the north.

During construction of the south-east portion of the Scenic Drive in the early 1930s, several quarries were opened up to supply coarse fill material. Two of these quarries were in Shaw Road and Carter Road, on either side of a narrow ridge that runs north from the Scenic Drive. During blasting operations, fossils were discovered in the Shaw Road quarry.

The road is also known as the place where Grace Millane's body was found after she had been murdered in 2018. The Piha Road and Scenic Drive intersection is also the last known location of French teenager Eloi Rolland, who went missing from the area on 7 March 2020.

== Recreation ==
A number of walking tracks in the Waitākere Ranges Regional Park are accessible from Scenic Drive, including the Fairy Falls Walk and the Goodfellow Circuit Tramping Track.
