= Huia, New Zealand =

Coastal settlement in West Auckland, New Zealand

Huia Te Huia
- Settlement
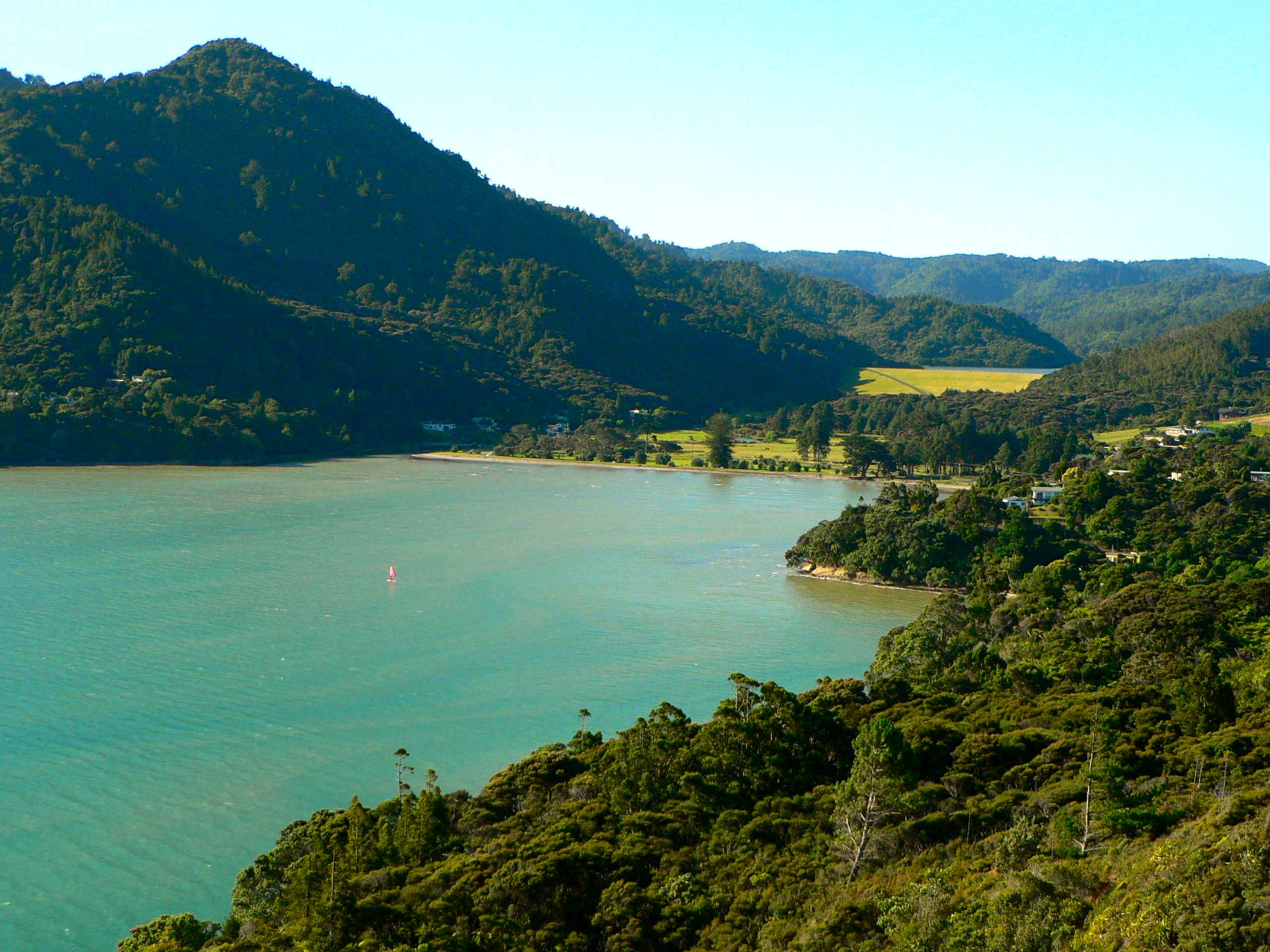
- Looking north-west from Huia look-out over Huia bay towards the Lower Huia Dam.
- Interactive map of Huia
- Coordinates: 36.999°S 174.569°E
- Country: New Zealand
- Region: Auckland
- Ward: Waitakere ward
- Local board: Waitakere Ranges
- Electorates: Waitākere; Tāmaki Makaurau (Māori)

Government
  - Territorial Authority: Auckland Council
  - Mayor of Auckland: Wayne Brown
  - Waitākere MP: Vanushi Walters
  - Tāmaki Makaurau MP: Oriini Kaipara

Area
  - Total: 3.49 ha (8.6 acres)

Population (June 2025)
  - Total: 670

(Waitākere Ranges)	(Waitākere Ranges)	(Waitākere Ranges)
Little Huia	Huia	Cornwallis
Whatipu	(Manukau Harbour)	(Manukau Harbour)

Huia is a coastal settlement on the Manukau Harbour, New Zealand and forms part of the Waitākere Ranges Regional Park. The majority of houses in Huia are located along Huia Road, which arcs around Huia Bay and heads west towards Little Huia.

== Geology and geography ==
A long time ago, tectonic forces between the Pacific Plate and Australian Plate uplifted the Waitākere Ranges and subsided the Manukau Harbour. The Huia Creek and valley are likely a part of a fault line that formed during this event. After the Last Glacial Maximum when sea levels rose, the river mouths of West Auckland flooded. While beaches formed at the mouths of Tasman Sea rivers, the relative lack of sand in the Manukau Harbour meant that Huia, Big Muddy Creek and Little Muddy Creek became tidal mudflats. The Huia area is dominated by a warm lowlands pūriri forest, with a band of diverse pōhutukawa/rātā sheltered coastal fringe forest on the western shores of Huia Bay.

== History ==
Huia was originally known as Te Huia as the area is thought to be named after a Waikato Tainui chief, Te Huia, who would seasonally live on the northern shores of the Manukau Harbour. Over time, Te Huia decided to remain at the bay, as he liked it so much. A long form of the traditional name is Te Rau-o-te-Huia ("The Plumes of Te Huia", the plumes also being a metaphor for his pride in the location). The English translation "The Huia" was used into the 1970s, but simply "Huia" has now become more commonplace. Carbon dating of shell middens at Hinge Bay, Huia, showed occupancy of Huia by Tāmaki Māori from at least the year 1520.

In 1853 the Gibbons family from Newfoundland arrived at Huia, setting up a mill for kauri logging. The Karamatura Stream to the west of Huia was one of the first streams in the Waitākere Ranges to be dammed for kauri logging, followed by the Marama and Kakamatua streams in the 1860s and the Huia Stream in the 1870s. The Gibbons family were joined by William and Mary Kilgour, who established a farm in the flatlands at Huia, and the Foote family, relatives of the Gibbons also from Newfoundland.

Construction on the Upper Huia Dam began in 1924, leading to wider development in the area as houses were constructed for workers' families. Material for the dam was brought by barge to Huia, and then by tramway to the dam site. The dam was completed in 1929, leading to an exodus of families who worked on the dam leaving the area. The tramway remained operational until the 1960s. After the construction of the dam, the area became popular with holidaymakers and retirees. As the Huia valley began to reforest, this fuelled a movement to develop the ranges as a regional park. The Centennial Memorial Park, a portion of which would later become the modern Waitākere Ranges, opened in 1940.

In the mid-1950s, a whale stranded at Huia. An attempt was made to explode the whale using gelignite, however this was mostly unsuccessful.

By the 1960s, a community of artists and poets had developed at Huia. In 1971, the Lower Huia Dam was constructed adjacent to the township.

== Demographics ==
Huia is described by Statistics New Zealand as a rural settlement, and covers 3.49 km^{2} (1.35 sq mi) and had an estimated population of 670 as of June 2025, with a population density of 192 people per km^{2}. It is part of the Waitākere Ranges South SA2 statistical area.

Historical population
Year	Pop.	±% p.a.
2006	546	—
2013	591	+1.14%
2018	639	+1.57%
2023	675	+1.10%

Huia had a population of 675 in the 2023 New Zealand census, an increase of 36 people (5.6%) since the 2018 census, and an increase of 84 people (14.2%) since the 2013 census. There were 327 males, 342 females and 6 people of other genders in 261 dwellings. 4.4% of people identified as LGBTIQ+. The median age was 43.4 years (compared with 38.1 years nationally). There were 129 people (19.1%) aged under 15 years, 87 (12.9%) aged 15 to 29, 348 (51.6%) aged 30 to 64, and 111 (16.4%) aged 65 or older.

People could identify as more than one ethnicity. The results were 93.3% European (Pākehā); 19.1% Māori; 6.2% Pasifika; 3.6% Asian; 0.4% Middle Eastern, Latin American and African New Zealanders (MELAA); and 1.8% other, which includes people giving their ethnicity as "New Zealander". English was spoken by 98.2%, Māori language by 2.2%, Samoan by 0.4%, and other languages by 9.8%. No language could be spoken by 1.8% (e.g. too young to talk). New Zealand Sign Language was known by 0.9%. The percentage of people born overseas was 20.4, compared with 28.8% nationally.

Religious affiliations were 16.4% Christian, 0.4% Islam, 0.4% Buddhist, 0.9% New Age, 0.4% Jewish, and 1.3% other religions. People who answered that they had no religion were 73.3%, and 7.1% of people did not answer the census question.

Of those at least 15 years old, 120 (22.0%) people had a bachelor's or higher degree, 294 (53.8%) had a post-high school certificate or diploma, and 93 (17.0%) people exclusively held high school qualifications. The median income was $48,900, compared with $41,500 nationally. 84 people (15.4%) earned over $100,000 compared to 12.1% nationally. The employment status of those at least 15 was that 279 (51.1%) people were employed full-time, 96 (17.6%) were part-time, and 21 (3.8%) were unemployed.

== Features ==
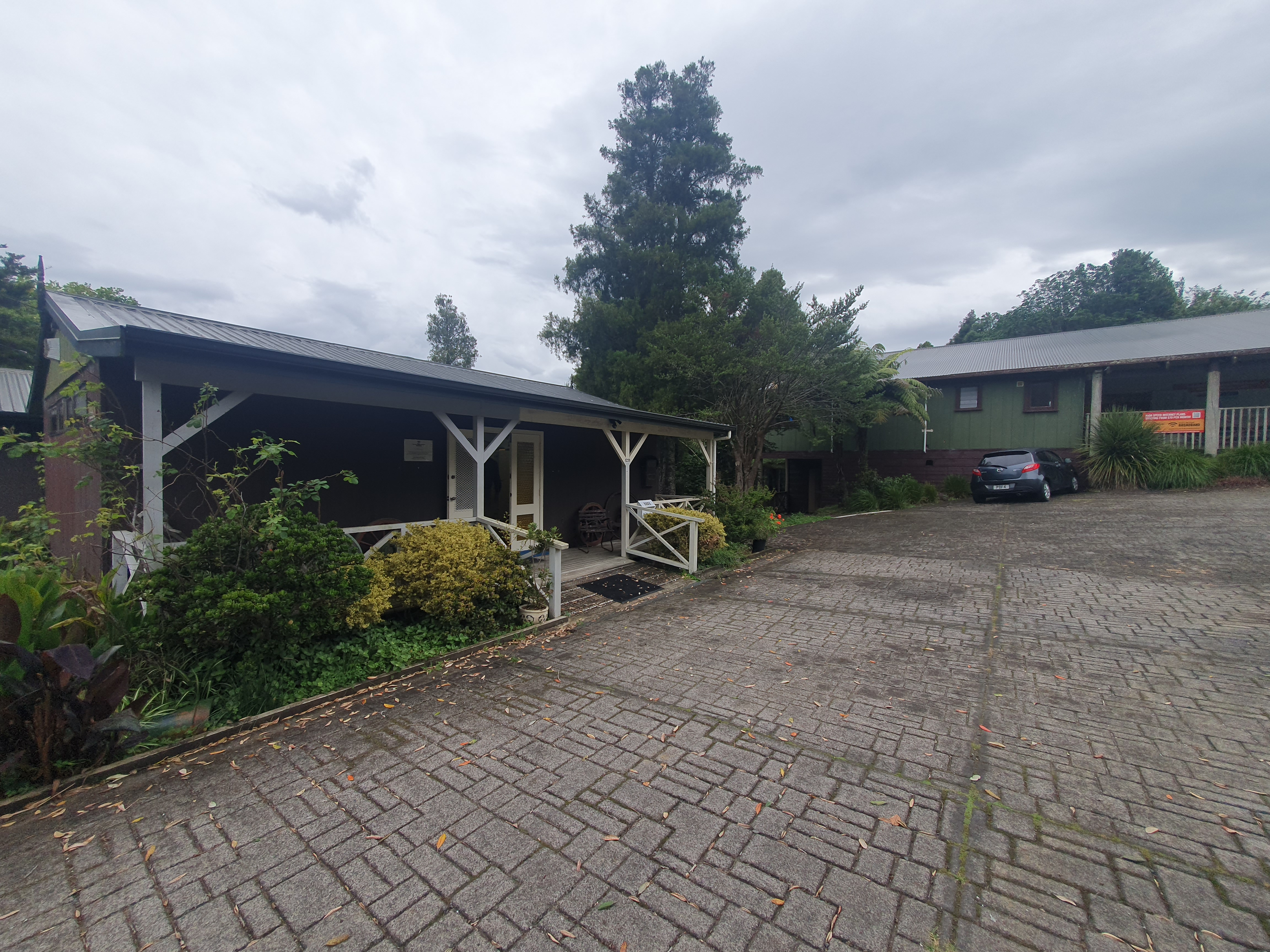
The Huia Settlers Museum

Alfreds Huia Store, the sole local general store and cafe, originally opened in 1886.

On the shores of Huia Bay is Huia Reserve, there are picnic tables, a BBQ, a small playground, basketball half-court and a half pipe for skating. It is close to the Lower Huia Dam, Upper Huia Dam and Karamatura Falls.

The Upper Huia Dam opened in 1929 and the Lower Huia Dam opened in 1971. Both reservoirs form part of the water supply for Auckland and are managed by Watercare Services.

The Auckland Council operates several accommodation facilities in the area including the Kiwanis Huia camp, Huia Lodge, Barr cottage (situated on the waterfront in Little Huia) and a camping area known as Barn Paddock in the Karamatura farm. Huia Lodge was the schoolhouse of Huia School between 1894 and 1961; the local state secondary school is Green Bay High School.

Huia Settlers Museum opened in 1984, is located near the entrance to the Karamatura Park. It contains many relics of the kauri felling and milling and artefacts from the wreck of HMS Orpheus.

Jonesonian Institute, a small eclectic museum and art gallery modelled on Museum of Jurassic Technology, is also located in Huia.

There are an abundance of walking tracks and beaches around the Huia area. The highest point in the Waitākere Ranges – Te Toiokawharu (474m), accessible via the Twin Peaks Track, is part of this valley.

As with much of the Waitākere Ranges, Huia has native birds, insects, bats and lizards. This eco-system is served by the Huia Trapping Group with support of Auckland Council as part of New Zealand's Predator Free by 2050 target.

Huia's volunteer fire brigade serves the communities of Cornwallis, Huia and Whatipu. The Brigade currently has 17 members all of which are volunteers. The station has a Fire Appliance and a Medical First Response van.

Residents of Huia are served by the Huia-Cornwallis Community Groupwho manage the Huia Hall and organise numerous community events throughout the year.

== Notes ==
=== References ===
- Diamond, John T.; Hayward, Bruce W. (1979). The Māori history and legends of the Waitākere Ranges. The Lodestar Press. ISBN 9781877431210.
- Diamond, John T.; Hayward, Bruce W. (1990). "Prehistoric Sites in West Auckland". In Northcote-Bade, James (ed.). West Auckland Remembers, Volume 1. West Auckland Historical Society. ISBN 0-473-00983-8.
- Harvey, Bruce; Harvey, Trixie (2009). "That Noble Sheet of Water". In Macdonald, Finlay; Kerr, Ruth (eds.). West: The History of Waitakere. Random House. ISBN 9781869790080.
- Hayward, Bruce (2009). "Land, Sea and Sky". In Macdonald, Finlay; Kerr, Ruth (eds.). West: The History of Waitakere. Random House. ISBN 9781869790080.
