= Waitākere Ranges =

Mountain range on the North Island of New Zealand

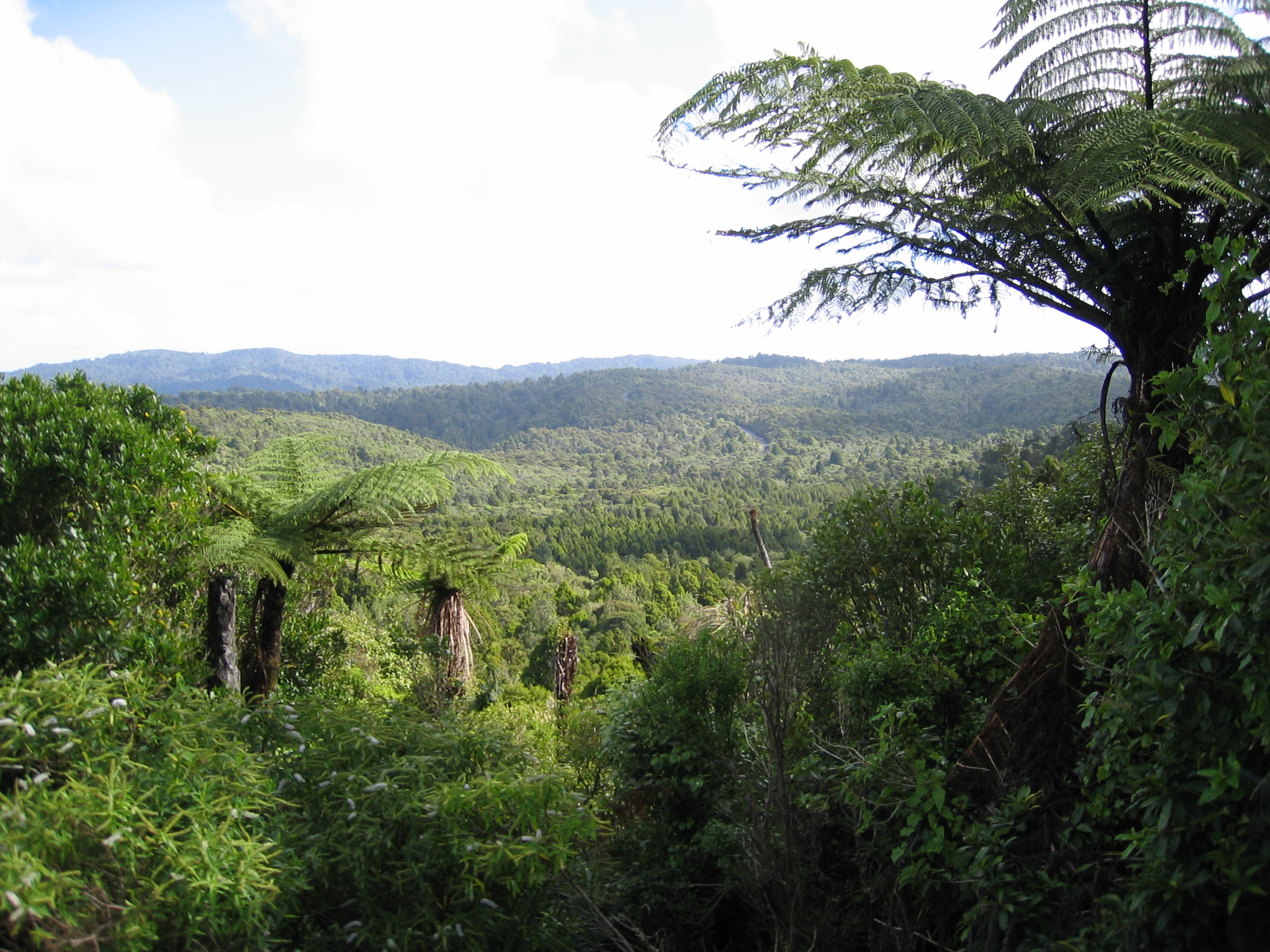
- View of the Waitākere Ranges from Scenic Drive

Highest point
- Peak: Te Toiokawharu
- Elevation: 474 m (1,555 ft)

Geography
- Map showing the approximate Waitākere Ranges volcanics in red shading with caldera of the Waitākere volcano (white shading). It allows wider volcanic context as clicking on the map enlarges it, and enables panning and mouseover of volcano name/wikilink and ages before present with other characterised vents as rectangles. The key to other volcanics that are shown (active in last million years odd) with panning is basalt - brown, monogenic basalts - dark brown, undifferentiated basalts of the Tangihua Complex in Northland Allochthon - light brown, arc basalts - deep orange brown, arc ring basalts -orange brown, dacite - purple), andesite - red, basaltic andesite`- light red), rhyolite - violet, ignimbrite (lighter shades of violet), and plutonic - gray.
- Country: New Zealand

Geology
- Rock age: Miocene

The Waitākere Ranges is a mountain range in New Zealand. Located in West Auckland between metropolitan Auckland and the Tasman Sea, the ranges and its foothills and coasts comprise some 27,720 hectares (68,500 acres) of public and private land. The area, traditionally known to Māori as Te Wao Nui o Tiriwa (The Great Forest of Tiriwa), is of local, regional, and national significance. The Waitākere Ranges includes a chain of hills in the Auckland Region, generally running approximately 25 kilometres (16 mi) from north to south, 25 km west of central Auckland. The ranges are part of the Waitākere Ranges Regional Park.

From 1 May 2018 the forested areas of the Waitākere Ranges Regional Park were closed, with some exceptions, while Auckland Council upgraded the tracks to dry foot standard protect the roots and to prevent the spread of kauri dieback, oomycete organisms that affect kauri trees and prevents them from getting nutrients, effectively killing them. There is no cure. But many are now marked as permanently closed, and their future is uncertain.

== Etymology ==
The name Wai-tākere originally came from a rock located in Waitākere Bay near Te Henga (Bethells Beach). In Māori the name Te Wao Nui a Tiriwa ("The Great Forest of Tiriwa"), referred to all of the forested areas south from Muriwai and the Kaipara Harbour portage to the Manukau Harbour, while the name Hikurangi referred to the central and Western Waitākere Ranges, south of the Waitākere River.

== Geology ==
The rugged upstanding topography is formed from erosion-resistant ancient volcanic conglomerate and lava flows laid down in eruptions from the large Waitākere volcano to the west 12–25 million years ago. The Waitākere Ranges and land south from Muriwai are the eastern slopes of the volcano, which were uplifted from the sea floor between 3 and 5 million years ago. Much of the rock that forms the ranges, such as the Piha Formation and Nihotupu Formation, are volcanic and marine conglomerate rocks. Many of the features of the ranges, such as Karekare, Te Toka-Tapu-a-Kupe / Ninepin Rock and Pukematekeo, are remnants of volcanic vents and plugs.

== Geography ==
The western coastline of the ranges consists of cliffs exceeding 300 metres (980 ft), interspersed infrequently with beaches. The ranges are covered in native forest, most of which is in the process of regeneration since extensive logging and farming in the mid–late 19th and early 20th centuries. The highest point in the Waitākere Ranges, at 474 metres (1,555 ft), is Te Toiokawharu, in the southern part of the ranges, about 3 kilometres (1.9 mi) north-east of Huia. The Scenic Drive follows a ridge of high points along the eastern ranges, connecting the communities of Titirangi, Waiatarua and Swanson. Along this ridge are some of the more notable peaks of the ranges, including Ruaotuwhenua, known for its radome and adjacent television mast, and Pukematekeo, the northernmost of the ranges which looks out over metropolitan Auckland.

== Biodiversity ==
In the Holocene prior to human settlement, the Waitākere Ranges was a densely forested podocarp-broadleaf forest, dominated by kauri, northern rātā and rimu. The ranges are home to one endemic species, Veronica bishopiana, the Waitākere rock koromiko, and additionally some species which are rare outside of coastal West Auckland, including Sophora fulvida, the west coast kōwhai and Veronica obtusata, the coastal hebe. The Waitākere Ranges are known for the wide variety of fern species (over 110), as well as native orchids, many of which self-established from seeds carried by winds from the east coast of Australia.

The Waitākere Ranges are home to many native species of bird, the New Zealand long-tailed bat and Hochstetter's frog, which have been impacted by introduced predatory species including rodents, stoats, weasels, possums and cats. At the northern end of the ranges, Otakamiro Point is the site of one of New Zealand's few mainland gannet breeding colonies. In the bush are many indigenous invertebrates, including kauri snail, wētā and oviparous velvet worms with 14 pairs of legs, and ovoviviparous species of 15 and 16 pairs of legs in the genus Peripatoides.

== History ==
=== Māori history ===
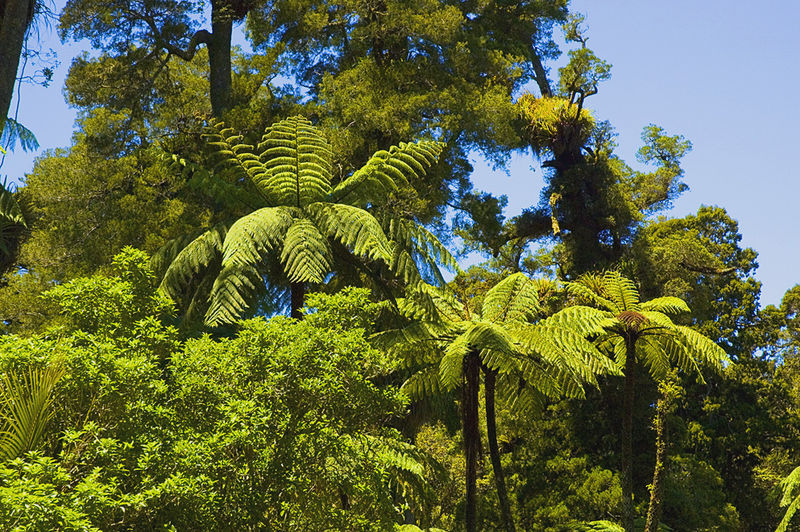
Typical forest in the Waitākere Ranges

A number of Tāmaki Māori are associated with the early settlement of the Waitākere Ranges. In the creation legend of the Auckland volcanic field, the Waitākere Ranges was home to a tribe of supernatural beings known as Tahurangi (called patupaiarehe in other traditions), who battled with the patupaiarehe of the Hunua Ranges. The Māori language name of the Waitākere Ranges, Te Wao Nui a Tiriwa, refers to Tiriwa, a chief of the Tūrehu patupaiarehe. The coastline of the ranges and the Manukau Harbour is traditionally thought to be guarded by the taniwha Paikea, while the Waitākere River and northern ranges were the home to Te Mokoroa, a malevolent taniwha. The ranges were visited by Rakatāura, the senior tohunga (priest/navigator) of the Tainui migratory canoe, who named many of the locations along the west coast.

The area is within the traditional rohe of the iwi Te Kawerau ā Maki, whose most intensive settlements were traditionally around the Waitākere River and Te Henga / Bethells Beach being major focal points for settlement. Much of the coastline and river valleys were settled due to the resource-rich forests and coastline, with over 550 recorded archaeological sites recorded in the area.

The warm, sheltered valleys of the west coast streams were well suited for growing crops such as kūmara, taro, hue (calabash) and aruhe (bracken fern), and were the cause of many early wars in the area. Te Kawerau ā Maki benefited from the abundant seafood found on the coast, as well as resources found deeper within the Waitākere Ranges, such as moa, seasonal berries, eels, crayfish and other birds. Over 50 pā were located around the Waitākere Ranges, and many caves and rock shelters were used as refuges during times of war between the 16th and 18th centuries, including Lion Rock at Piha, which was the location of Whakaari pā, and the caves in Whatipu. The Waitākere Ranges sites have a large number of wood and fibre artefacts due to the weather conditions of the area. Surveys in the early 1900s uncovered traditional textile fragments such as fishing nets, baskets, cloak fragments, from locations such as Anawhata, Piha, Takatu Point, Karekare and Whatipu. In 1853 and 1854, the New Zealand government acquired around 100,000 acres of Te Kawerau ā Maki land, purchased from other iwi without consultation of Te Kawerau ā Maki. Reserves were created at Piha and Te Henga (Bethells Beach), however by the 1950s almost all Te Kawerau ā Maki land in the Waitākere Ranges had been partitioned and sold.

=== Kauri logging industry ===
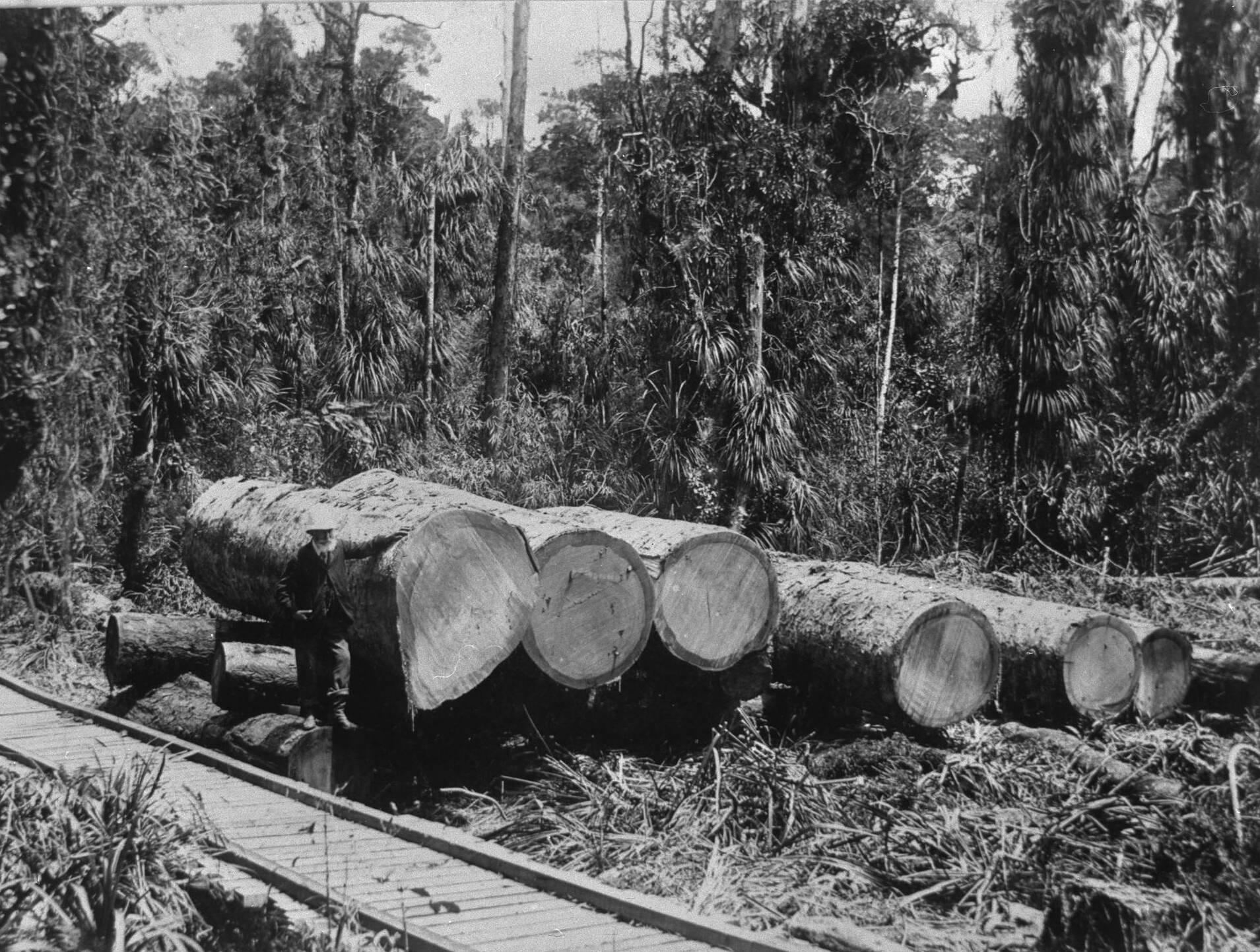
Kauri logs ready for transport in the upper Nihotupu Stream valley (1895)

In the 18th century, significant areas of the Waitākere Ranges were forested with kauri. Tāmaki Māori tribes had traditionally felled kauri wood to construct waka, and early European visitors in the 1790s likely began harvesting young kauri trees for sailing ship spars. During the early colonial era, the Waitākere Ranges were a major source for kauri wood. Kauri trees near the Manukau Harbour were first felled in the 1830s. Between 1840 and 1940, 23 timber mills worked the Waitākere Ranges. Approximately 70 dams were constructed along the waterways of the Waitākere Ranges, which loggers would break in order for kauri to be sent downstream with the flood of water.

A major sawmill was constructed at Whatipu, and in the latter 19th century a wharf was constructed on the north-east side of Paratutae Island for the industry. A tramway was constructed along the west coast gradually between the 1870s and 1914 linking to the sawmill and wharf, eventually being extended as far as Anawhata. The wharf was used until 1921, and was demolished in 1950.

The 1920s signalled the end of the kauri logging industry, as there was little kauri forest left in the Waitākeres. An estimated 120,000 trees were felled by the kauri logging industry, many of which were damaged and unable to be turned into timber, due inefficient logging techniques.

=== Water reservoirs ===
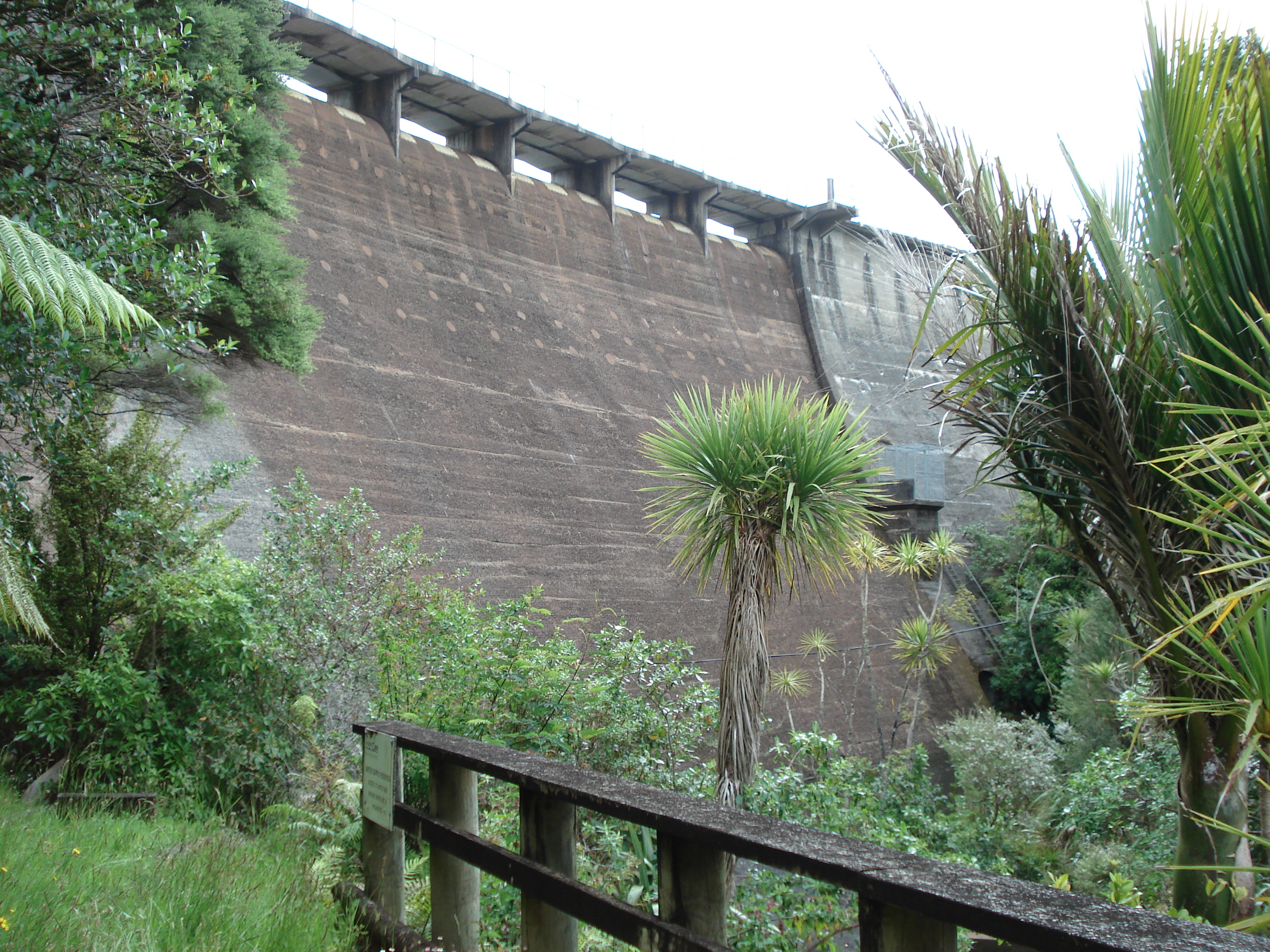
The Waitākere Dam

By the late 19th century, Auckland was plagued with seasonal droughts. A number of options were considered to counter this, including the construction of water reservoirs in the Waitākere Ranges. The first of these projects was the Waitākere Dam in the north-eastern Waitākere Ranges, which was completed in 1910. The Waitākere Dam was constructed overtop of the Waitākere Falls, which was a major tourist attraction in Auckland in the late 19th and early 20th centuries. The construction of the Waitākere Dam permanently reduced the flow of the Waitākere River, greatly impacting the Te Kawerau ā Maki community at Te Henga / Bethells Beach. Between the 1910s and 1950s, most members of Te Kawerau ā Maki moved away from their traditional rohe, in search of employment or community with other Māori.

Further reservoirs were constructed along the different river catchments in the Waitākere Ranges: the Upper Nihotupu Reservoir in 1923; the Huia Reservoir in 1929; and the Lower Nihotupu Reservoir in 1948.

The five reservoirs continue to operate today, supplying water. Combined, the reservoirs supply approximately 26% of Auckland's potable water demand. The ranges receive an average of over 2,000 mm (78.75 inches) of rainfall annually while the corresponding rate in the city is less than half that. As weather systems approach across the Tasman Sea, their path is blocked by the ranges causing a small uplift sufficient to trigger orographic rainfall.

=== Regional Park ===
By the late 19th century, the Waitākere Ranges area became popular for sightseers, notably the Waitākere Falls and the Gap at Piha. In 1894 a group led by Sir Algernon Thomas (the first professor of natural sciences at Auckland University College, now the University of Auckland) persuaded the Auckland City Council to preserve 3,500 acres (14 km^{2}) in the Nihotupu area of the ranges as a bush reserve. In 1895 the national Government vested the land, and several other smaller areas of the ranges, in the City Council as "reserves for the conservation of native flora and fauna".

After the construction of the dams in the 1920s, the Nihotupu and Huia areas reforested in native bush. This forest left a strong impression on residents who lived in these communities, and was one of the major factors that sparked the campaign for the Waitākere Ranges to become a nature reserve. The Auckland Centennial Memorial Park opened in 1940, commemorating 100 years since the establishment of Auckland. It was formed from various pockets of land that had been reserved by the Auckland City Council starting in 1895. Titirangi resident Arthur Mead, the principal engineer who created the Waitākere Ranges dams, lobbied the city council and negotiated with landowners to expand the park. Owing to the efforts of Mead, the park had tripled in size by 1964, when it became the Waitākere Ranges Regional Park. By 1992, the area had reached a size of 17,000 hectares (42,000 acres), and was formally consolidated into a single regional park. By this point, the park had become one of the regional parks in New Zealand, alongside the Hunua Ranges.

=== Conservation and kauri dieback ===
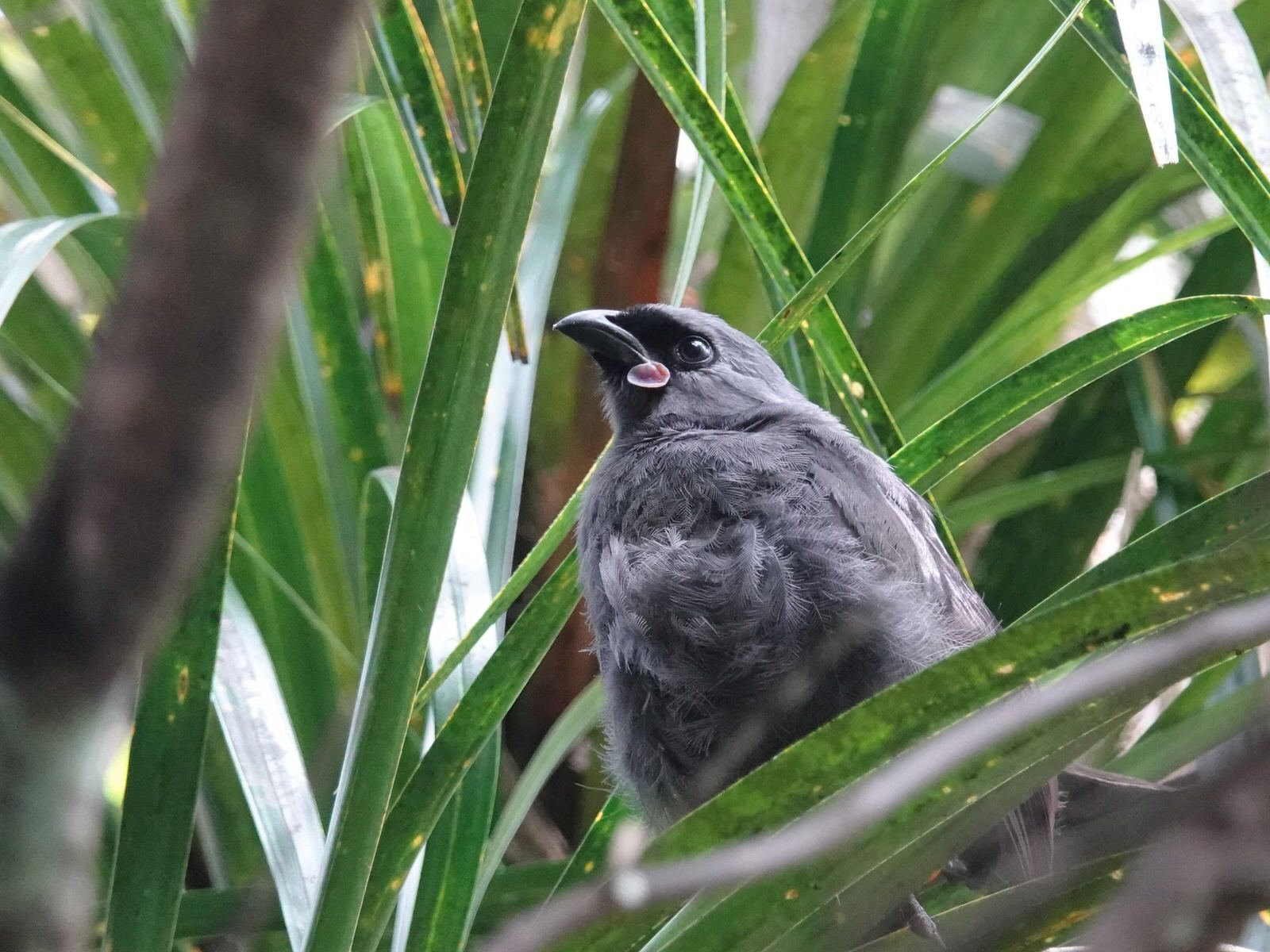
North Island kōkako were reintroduced to the Waitākere Ranges in 2009.

Ark in the Park is a collaborative project between Forest and Bird and the Auckland Council. First established in 2002 by volunteers, the project began with a gated area of 200 hectares (490 acres) within the Waitākere Ranges Regional Park that was regularly trapped by volunteers. By 2019, this area had grown to 2,270 hectares (5,600 acres), and led to reintroductions of New Zealand bird species, including the whitehead (pōpokatea), North Island robin (toutouwai) and North Island kōkako; the latter having last been seen in the ranges in the 1950s. In 2008, the Waitākere Ranges Heritage Area Act was produced, as formal legislation to ensure the protection of the park. The Waitākere Ranges Regional Park covers about 60% of the area protected by the Waitākere Ranges Heritage Area Act of 2008. The act protects approximately 27,700 ha of both public (the Waitākere Ranges Regional Park) and privately owned land.

In March 2006, entomologist Peter Maddison noticed many mature kauri in the Waitākere Ranges had been infected with a distinct oomycete disease. After the disease had begun to increasingly impact kauri in the ranges, Te Kawerau ā Maki announced a rāhui in 2017, asking for members of the public to not enter the ranges as a measure to protect the trees against kauri dieback. This was followed by a formal vote by Auckland Council to restrict access to the Waitākere Ranges a year later.

Tracks in the ranges have slowly begun to be reopened, after extensive work on tracks to incorporate boardwalks and gravel as protective measures for kauri.

== Attractions ==
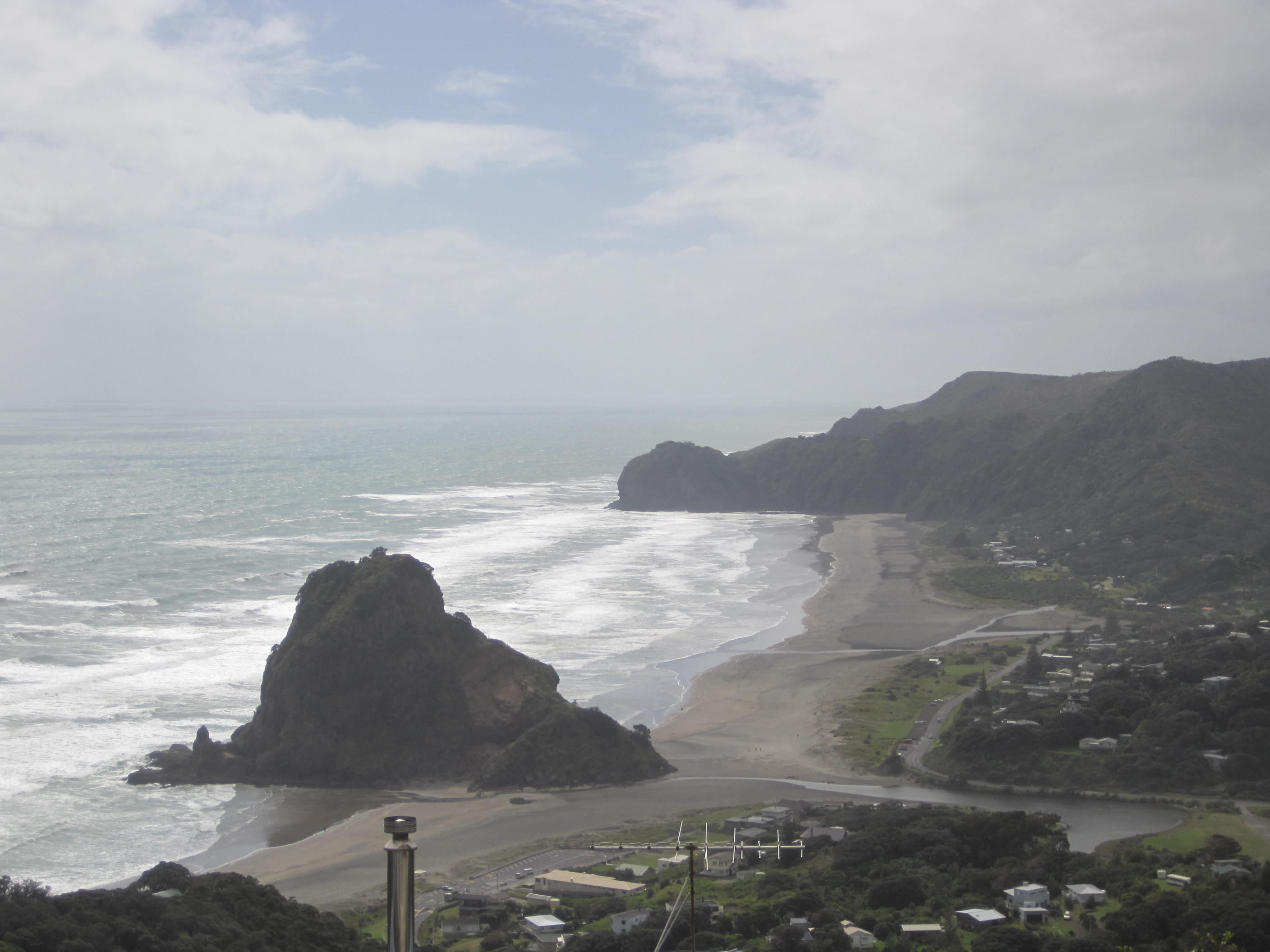
Lion Rock, Piha

Some of the ranges' main attractions are: the four popular surf beaches, Piha, Muriwai, Te Henga (Bethells Beach), Karekare; an extensive network of bush walks and tracks; and panoramic views of the east and west coasts and the city. A road, aptly named Scenic Drive, runs a good portion of the length of the ranges from Titirangi to Swanson. Auckland City Council operates an information centre on Scenic Drive, called Arataki Visitor Centre.

The beaches are typical of west coast beaches north of Taranaki in that they are all black sand beaches. They have a reputation of being dangerous for swimmers due to rips and large swells. Surf Life Saving Clubs patrol designated areas of the four most popular beaches during the summer months. Piha Surf Life Saving Club is the oldest of these, being founded in 1934.

On 11 January 2010, the Auckland Regional Council opened the Hillary Trail, a 77 km trail running roughly south–north from the Arataki Visitor Centre to Muriwai through the Waitākere Ranges, named in honour of the New Zealand mountaineer Sir Edmund Hillary. The Hilary Trail is regarded as one of or maybe the best multi day hike in the north of the country.

== Demographics ==
The statistical areas making up Waitākere Ranges, which include the populated areas of Huia and Karekare but not Piha or Te Henga / Bethells Beach, cover 188.36 km^{2} (72.73 sq mi) and had an estimated population of 2,410 as of June 2025, with a population density of 12.8 people per km^{2}.

Historical population
Year	Pop.	±% p.a.
2006	2,037	—
2013	2,151	+0.78%
2018	2,385	+2.09%
2023	2,409	+0.20%

Waitākere Ranges had a population of 2,409 in the 2023 New Zealand census, an increase of 24 people (1.0%) since the 2018 census, and an increase of 258 people (12.0%) since the 2013 census. There were 1,221 males, 1,170 females and 21 people of other genders in 876 dwellings. 3.7% of people identified as LGBTIQ+. There were 432 people (17.9%) aged under 15 years, 333 (13.8%) aged 15 to 29, 1,248 (51.8%) aged 30 to 64, and 396 (16.4%) aged 65 or older.

People could identify as more than one ethnicity. The results were 92.0% European (Pākehā); 14.1% Māori; 5.6% Pasifika; 4.7% Asian; 1.0% Middle Eastern, Latin American and African New Zealanders (MELAA); and 1.6% other, which includes people giving their ethnicity as "New Zealander". English was spoken by 97.4%, Māori language by 2.7%, Samoan by 0.4%, and other languages by 10.8%. No language could be spoken by 1.9% (e.g. too young to talk). New Zealand Sign Language was known by 0.5%. The percentage of people born overseas was 21.7, compared with 28.8% nationally.

Religious affiliations were 17.7% Christian, 0.7% Hindu, 0.1% Islam, 0.2% Māori religious beliefs, 0.9% Buddhist, 1.4% New Age, 0.1% Jewish, and 2.1% other religions. People who answered that they had no religion were 69.7%, and 7.6% of people did not answer the census question.

Of those at least 15 years old, 489 (24.7%) people had a bachelor's or higher degree, 1,020 (51.6%) had a post-high school certificate or diploma, and 318 (16.1%) people exclusively held high school qualifications. 306 people (15.5%) earned over $100,000 compared to 12.1% nationally. The employment status of those at least 15 was that 1,008 (51.0%) people were employed full-time, 345 (17.5%) were part-time, and 54 (2.7%) were unemployed.

Individual statistical areas
Name	Area (km^{2})	Population	Density (per km^{2})	Dwellings	Median age	Median income
Waitākere Ranges North	86.81	1,260	14.5	435	43.7 years	$46,800
Waitākere Ranges South	101.55	1,149	11.3	441	43.5 years	$42,800
New Zealand					38.1 years	$41,500

== List of peaks ==
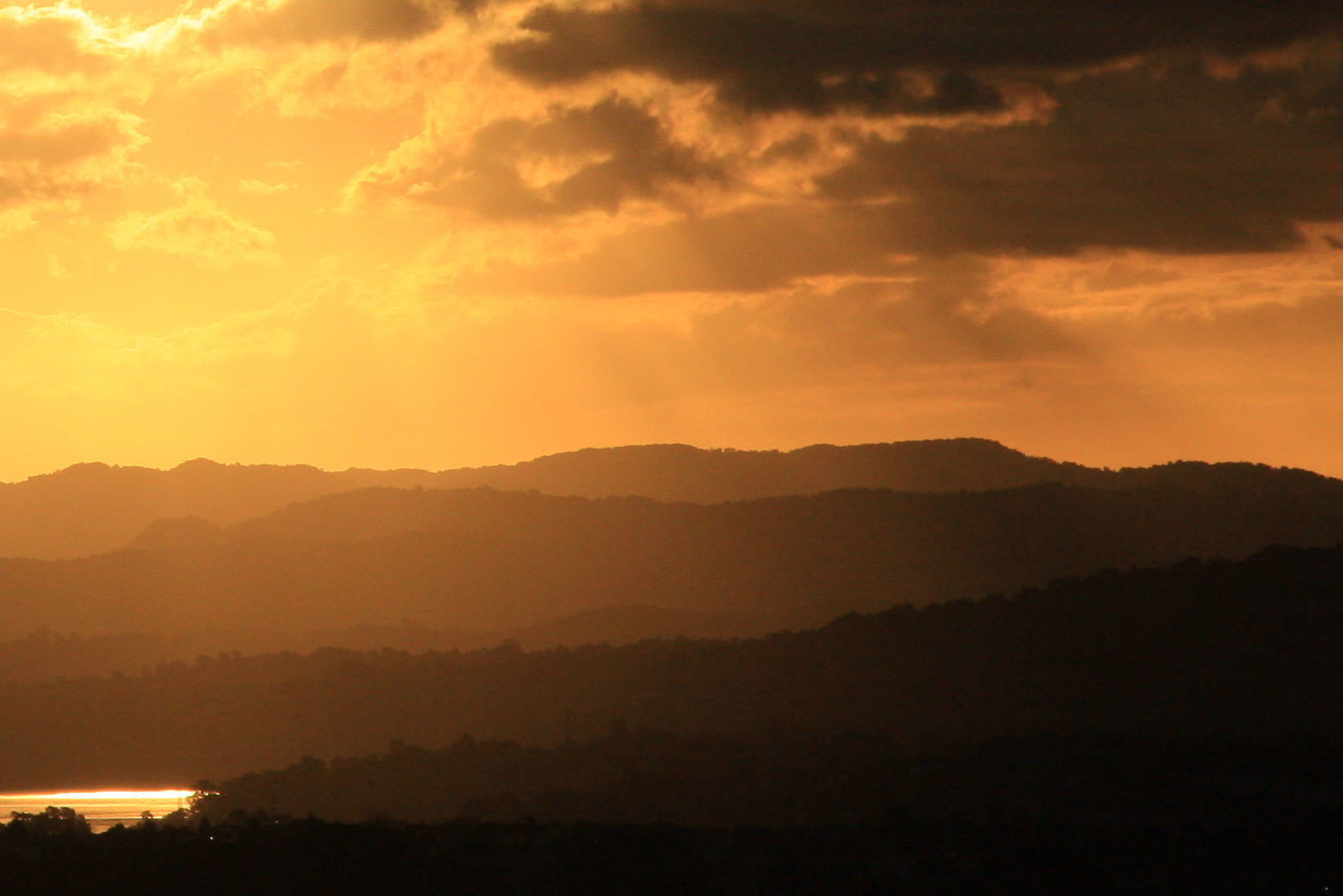
The highest point in the Waitākere Ranges, Te Toiokawharu, is surrounded by unnamed peaks of similar heights.

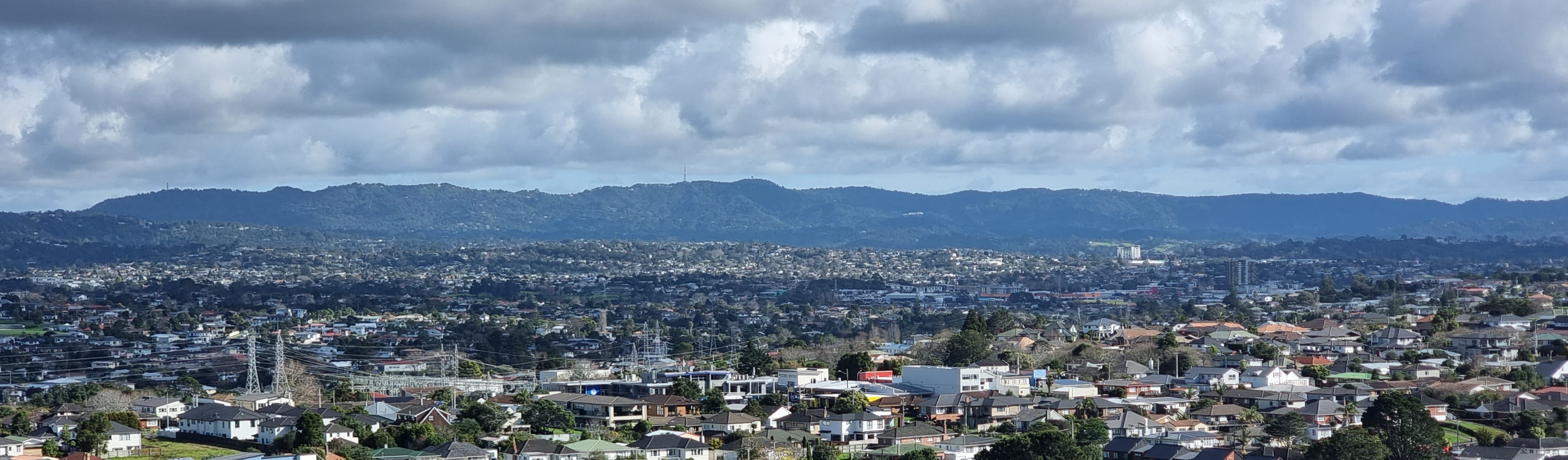
Many of the most well-known peaks of the Waitākere Ranges are found along the Scenic Drive ridge adjacent to Auckland, such as Ruaotuwhenua (centre).

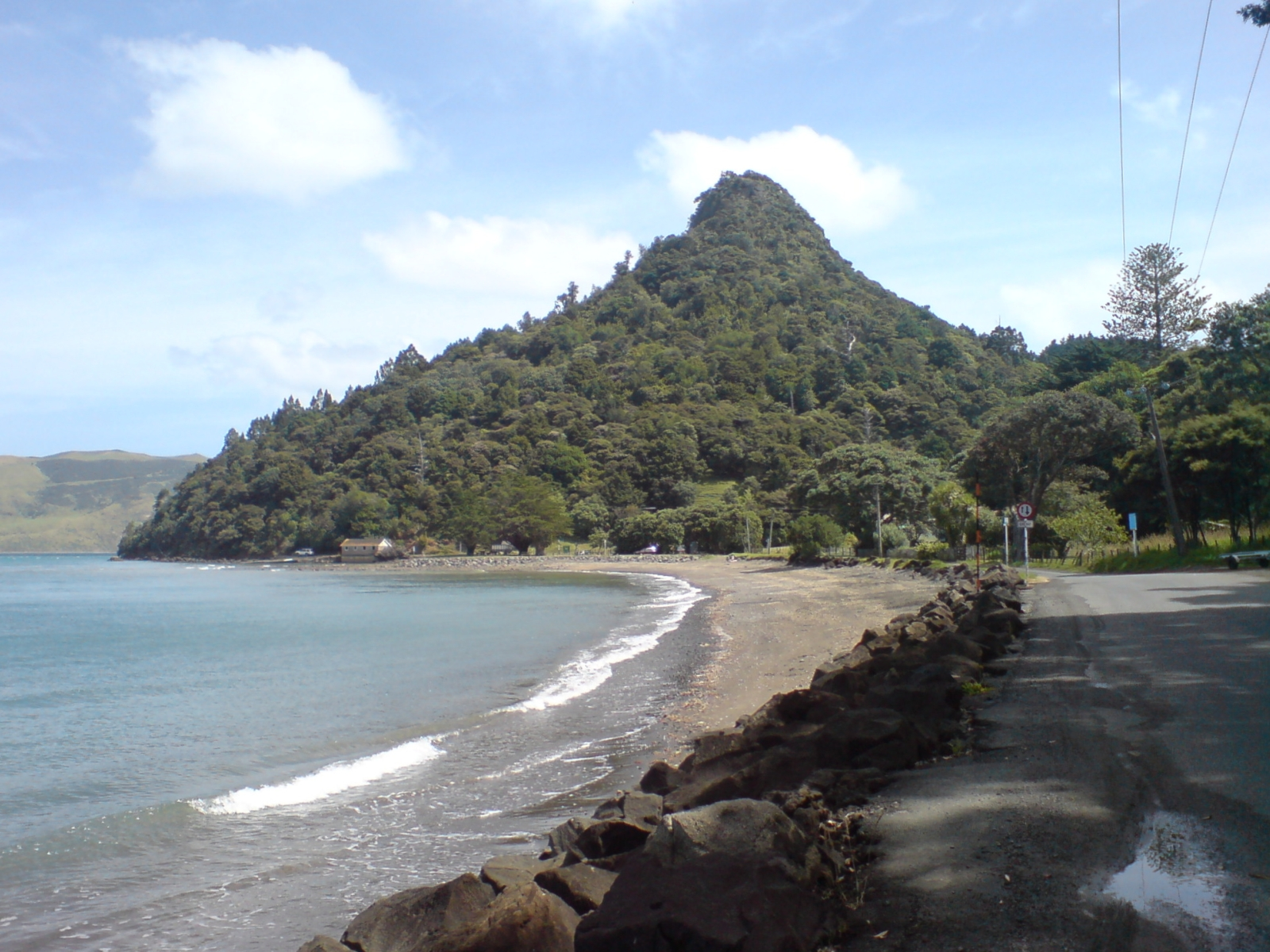
Many of the named peaks of the Waitākere Ranges are coastal features, such as Te Kā-a-Maki / Jackie Hill in Little Huia.

List of named peaks (either officially gazetted, informal or traditional) within the Waitākere Ranges, and major unnamed peaks over 400 metres in height.

Peak	Other names	Height	Location (Coordinates)	Refs
Te Toiokawharu		474 metres (1,555 ft)	36.98468°S 174.53446°E	
		470 metres (1,540 ft)	36.97961°S 174.53307°E	
		469 metres (1,539 ft)	36.98258°S 174.53313°E	
		453 metres (1,486 ft)	36.99193°S 174.53165°E	
Ruaotuwhenua		440 metres (1,440 ft)	36.92429°S 174.55275°E	
		428 metres (1,404 ft)	36.97473°S 174.51166°E	
		428 metres (1,404 ft)	37.00110°S 174.52911°E	
		418 metres (1,371 ft)	36.97721°S 174.52752°E	
		409 metres (1,342 ft)	36.92628°S 174.53038°E	
		409 metres (1,342 ft)	36.94068°S 174.52098°E	
		407 metres (1,335 ft)	36.93599°S 174.52360°E	
Te Rau-o-te-Huia / Mount Donald McLean		389 metres (1,276 ft)	37.01430°S 174.53124°E	
Goat Hill		352 metres (1,155 ft)	36.99305°S 174.55789°E	
Smyth Corner		337 metres (1,106 ft)	36.89926°S 174.49976°E	
Pukematekeo		336 metres (1,102 ft)	36.88344°S 174.53835°E	
Bluff Hill		325 metres (1,066 ft)	36.97205°S 174.55122°E	
Simla		323 metres (1,060 ft)	36.90878°S 174.51183°E	
Higham Peak		292 metres (958 ft)	37.01012°S 174.55582°E	
Mount Gillies		289 metres (948 ft)	36.88656°S 174.44372°E	
Hikurangi		278 metres (912 ft)	36.97051°S 174.46371°E	
Kuataika		265 metres (869 ft)	36.90758°S 174.46933°E	
Parekura Peak		265 metres (869 ft)	36.91967°S 174.57385°E	
Mount Zion	Paeokioki	263 metres (863 ft)	36.94676°S 174.47436°E	
Baldy		223 metres (732 ft)	37.00773°S 174.48292°E	
Rangikapiki		217 metres (712 ft)	36.90525°S 174.46083°E	
Maungaroa		210 metres (690 ft)	36.94676°S 174.47436°E	
Mount Titirangi	Mount Atkinson	199 metres (653 ft)	36.93916°S 174.64887°E	
Taumaiti		171 metres (561 ft)	36.88656°S 174.44372°E	
Puketai		153 metres (502 ft)	36.91472°S 174.44949°E	
Te Kā-a-Maki / Jackie Hill		148 metres (486 ft)	37.01863°S 174.55450°E	

== Bibliography ==
- Cranwell-Smith, Lucy (2006). "Rain Forest of the Waitakeres". In Harvey, Bruce; Harvey, Trixie (eds.). Waitakere Ranges: Ranges of Inspiration, Nature, History, Culture. Waitakere Ranges Protection Society. ISBN 978-0-476-00520-4.
- Esler, Alan (2006). "Forest Zones". In Harvey, Bruce; Harvey, Trixie (eds.). Waitakere Ranges: Ranges of Inspiration, Nature, History, Culture. Waitakere Ranges Protection Society. ISBN 978-0-476-00520-4.
- Grant, Simon (2009). "Call of the Wild". In Macdonald, Finlay; Kerr, Ruth (eds.). West: The History of Waitakere. Random House. ISBN 9781869790080.
- Harvey, Bruce; Harvey, Trixie (2009). "That Noble Sheet of Water". In Macdonald, Finlay; Kerr, Ruth (eds.). West: The History of Waitakere. Random House. pp. 87–104. ISBN 9781869790080.
- Hatch, J. D. (2006). "Native Orchids". In Harvey, Bruce; Harvey, Trixie (eds.). Waitakere Ranges: Ranges of Inspiration, Nature, History, Culture. Waitakere Ranges Protection Society. ISBN 978-0-476-00520-4.
- Hayward, Bruce W. (1989). Kauri Gum and the Gumdiggers. The Bush Press. ISBN 0-908608-39-X.
- Jones, Sandra (2006). "Uncommon Trees and Shrubs of the Waitakeres". In Harvey, Bruce; Harvey, Trixie (eds.). Waitakere Ranges: Ranges of Inspiration, Nature, History, Culture. Waitakere Ranges Protection Society. ISBN 978-0-476-00520-4.
- La Roche, John (2011). "Auckland's Water Supply". In La Roche, John (ed.). Evolving Auckland: The City's Engineering Heritage. Wily Publications. ISBN 9781927167038.
- Taua, Te Warena (2009). "He Kohikohinga Kōrero mō Hikurangi". In Macdonald, Finlay; Kerr, Ruth (eds.). West: The History of Waitakere. Random House. pp. 23–48. ISBN 9781869790080.
