= Te Toiokawharu =

Hill in the Waitākere Ranges, New Zealand

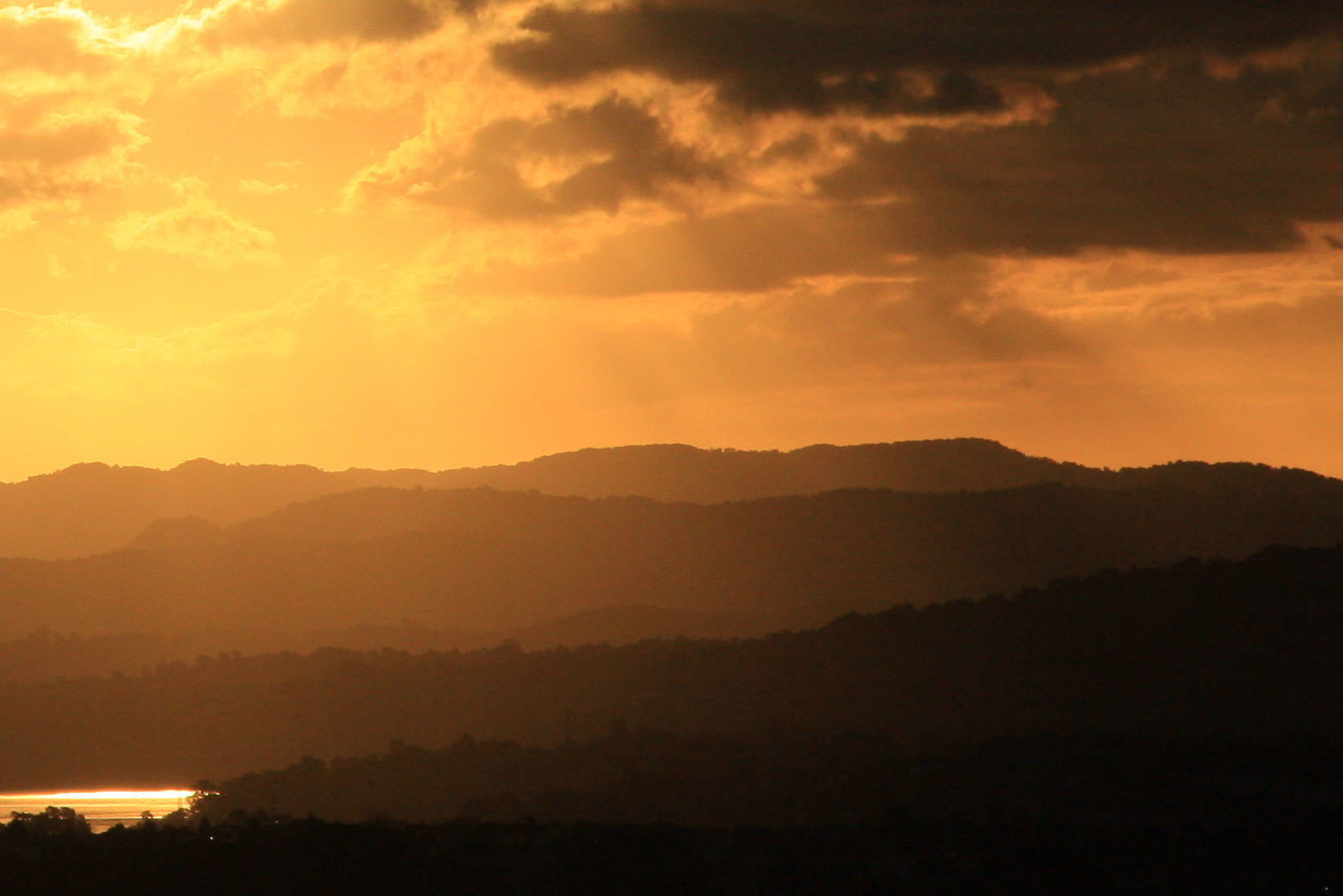
- Te Toiokawharu (centre), seen from Maungakiekie / One Tree Hill

Highest point
- Elevation: 474 m (1,555 ft)
- Coordinates: 36.984687°S 174.536657°E

Geography
- Location: North Island, New Zealand
- Parent range: Waitākere Ranges

Geology
- Rock age: Miocene

Te Toiokawharu is a hill in the Waitākere Ranges of the Auckland Region of New Zealand's North Island. At 474-metres, it is the tallest peak of the Waitākere Ranges. The peak has a low prominence due to surrounding hills of similar sizes.

== Description ==
The hill is a 474-metre peak in the central Waitākere Ranges. It is accessible by the Twin Peaks Track, a tramping track linking Huia and the Huia Ridge Track. The northern side of Te Toiokawharu is the source of the Georges Stream, which flows into the Lower Huia Dam, while the southern side is the source for the Karamatura Stream. Both waterways flow into the Manukau Harbour near Huia. Geologically, Te Toiokawharu and the upper Huia and Karamatura stream valleys are formed of Miocene-era breccia rock formation.

Te Toiokawharu is the highest point of the mainland Auckland Region, shorter than Hauraki Gulf island peaks such as Mount Hauturu (722-metres) on Little Barrier Island, and a number of peaks on Great Barrier Island including Mount Hobson (627-metres) and Tataweka (526-metres). Kohukohunui, the highest point of the Hunua Ranges at 688-metres, was formerly the highest point in the mainland Auckland Region, until the 2010 local government boundary changes, which redistributed Franklin District between the Auckland Council and Hauraki District of the Waikato Region.

== History ==
Te Toiokawharu, along with the entire Waitākere Ranges area, is within the traditional rohe of the Te Kawerau ā Maki iwi. The hill, alongside an adjacent peak, were known to Te Kawerau ā Maki people as Ngā Puketūrua, or the hills of burrows. The hill was recognised as the highest point of the Waitākere Ranges in the early 1940s, when city waterworks engineer AD Mead located and measured the height of Te Toiokawharu. The hill had not previously been surveyed, due to its isolation and unsuitability for a trig station location. The name Te Toiokawharu, "The Peak of Kawharu", references the giant Waikato Tainui warrior Kāwharu, who together with Ngāti Whātua attacked the Waitākere Ranges settlements in the late 17th century. The peak was the location of a hollow tree, where hunters would wait to ensnare kererū.

The name was chosen by Wiremu Paora and Rangitutahi of Ngāti Whātua in the 1941, descendants of Kāwharu who were consulted by the New Zealand Geographical Board. The hill's traditional name, Puketūrua, was not known by the board at this point.

== Recreation ==
Te Toiokawharu is accessible by the Twin Peaks Track, a walking track in the Waitākere Ranges Regional Park.
