= Little Huia =

Coastal settlement in West Auckland, New Zealand

- Suburb
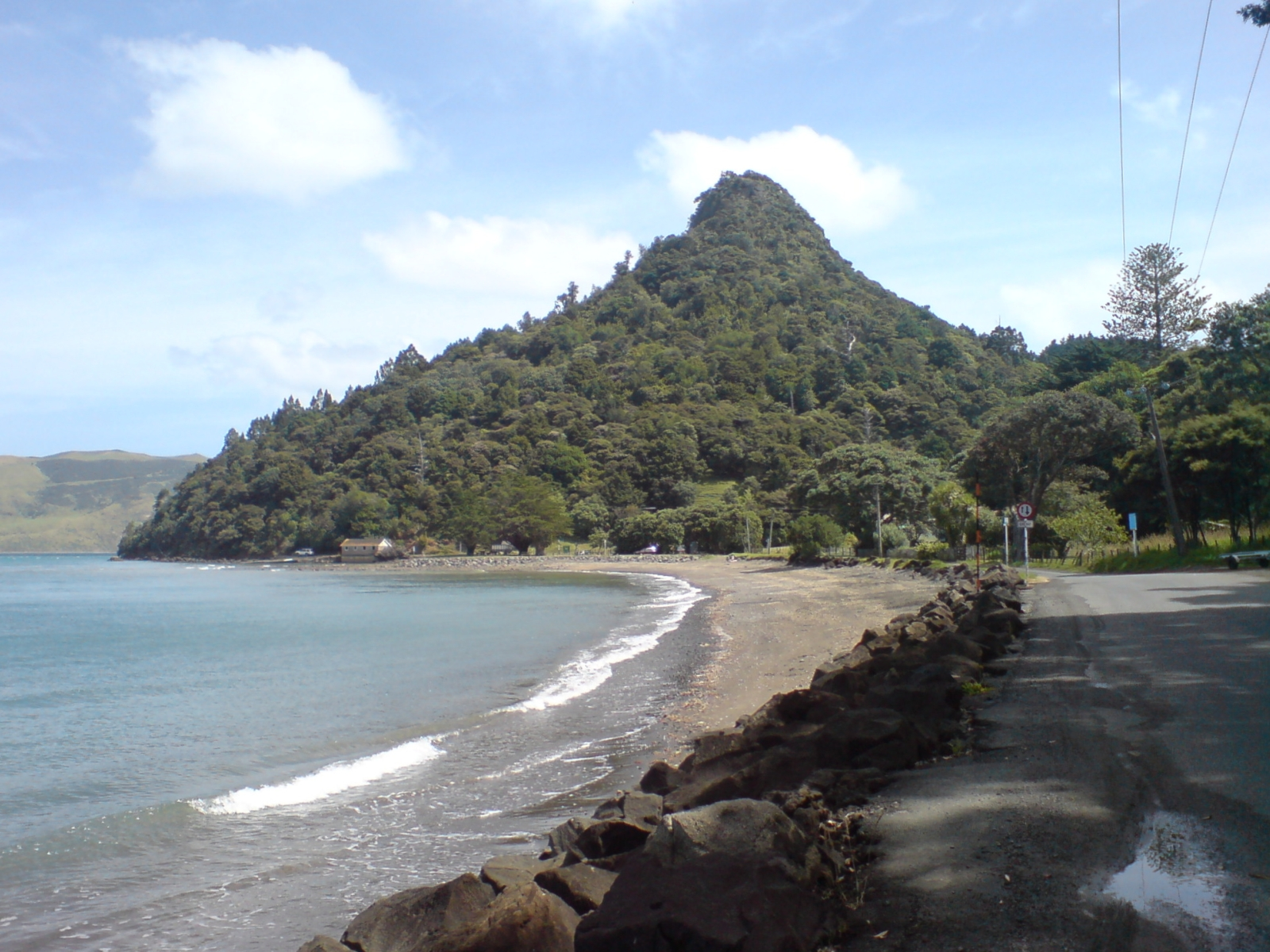
- Little Huia Village and Te Kā-a-Maki / Jackie Hill
- Interactive map of Little Huia
- Coordinates: 37.016°S 174.554°E
- Country: New Zealand
- City: Auckland Council
- Electoral ward: Waitākere ward
- Local board: Waitākere Ranges Local Board

Area
  - Land: 233 ha (580 acres)

Population (2023 Census)
  - Total: 138
  - Density: 59.2/km^{2} (153/sq mi)

		Huia
	Little Huia
Whatipu		(Manukau Harbour)

Little Huia is a western coastal settlement of West Auckland, Auckland, New Zealand and forms part of the Waitākere Ranges Regional Park, bordering the Manukau Harbour. It is located south-west of the settlement of Huia.

== Geography ==
The settlement is found in the lower Waitākere Ranges, where the Marama Stream forms a valley as it flows into the Manukau Harbour. South of the settlement is Te Kā-a-Maki / Jackie Hill, a headland in the Manukau Harbour. At the base of this headland is Kaiteke Point, the western-most opening of the Huia Bay.

The Little Huia area is dominated by a warm lowlands pūriri forest. The coastline between Whatipu and Little Huia is a unique ecosystem in the area as it is semi-exposed to the Tasman Sea, leading to a diverse pūriri/pōhutukawa forest that includes nīkau, Coprosma arborea and Sophora fulvida. Pittosporum ellipticum, otherwise rare in the Waitākere Ranges, is relatively common on dry hillsides sheltered from saltspray.

== History ==
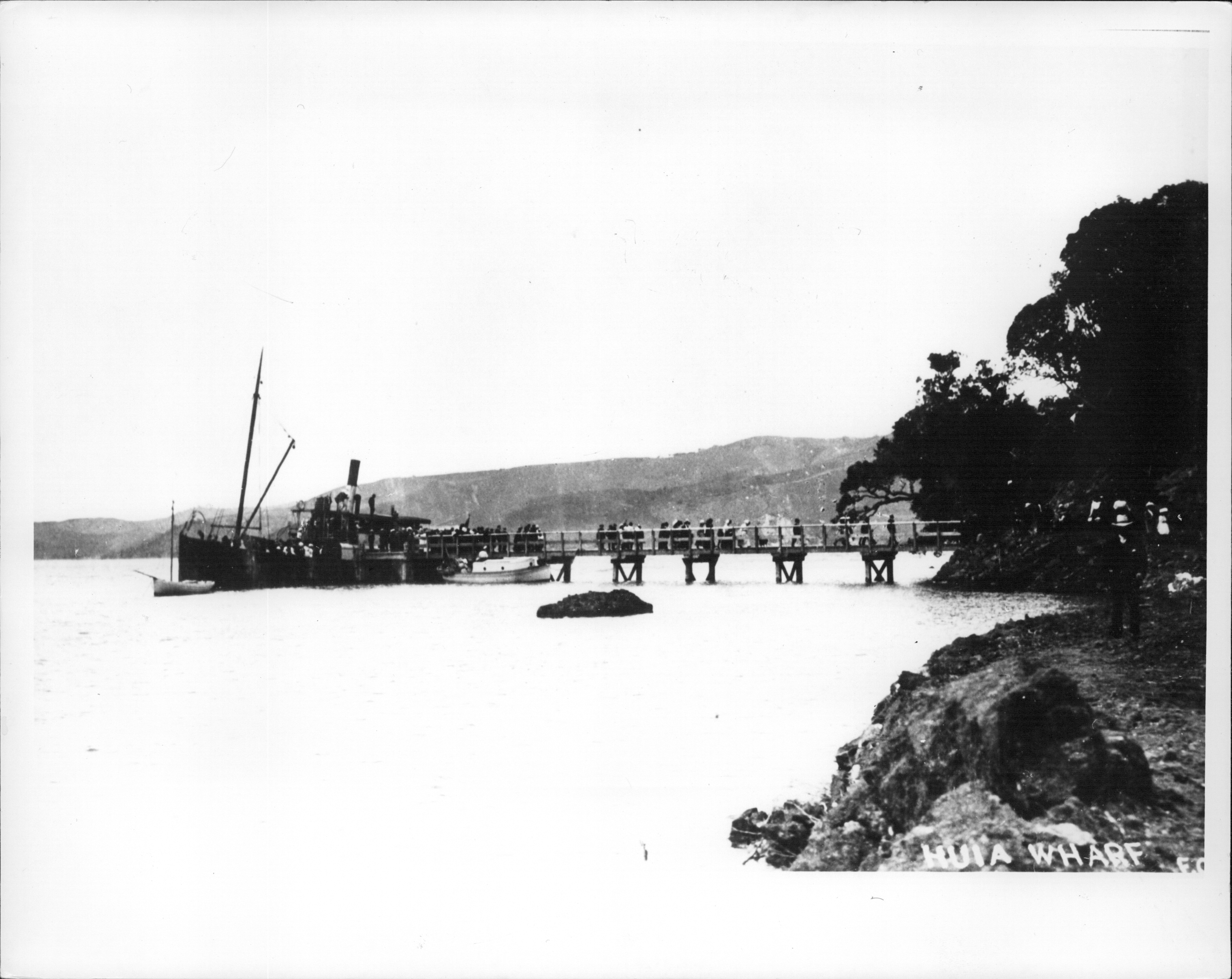
Little Huia Wharf in 1909

The settlement is in the traditional rohe of Te Kawerau ā Maki, close to the location of Te Komoki, one of the few West Auckland pā to have defensive ditches. Te Komoki pā site is located at Te Kā-a-Maki / Jackie Hill, a 148-metre hill to the south of Little Huia. The pā has 12 terrances and five pits, protected by cliff faces on three sides and a ditch on the fourth. Te Komoki is one of the best preserved pā of the Waitākere Ranges. The name for the hill, Te Kā-a-Maki ("The Fires of Maki"), refers to Maki, the eponymous ancestor of Te Kawerau ā Maki.

Kaiteke Point ("feigning eating"), the south-western point of Huia Bay, is named after a traditional story involving a Waikato Tainui chief who visited the northern shores of the Manukau Harbour. Travelling westwards, he was welcomed by the people of Huia with a feast of tarakihi fish. On the other side of the bay, he was welcomed with a second feast. Too full from the tarakihi but too polite to refuse, the chief feigned eating the food from the feast. This legend gave rise to the name of the eastern point of Huia Bay, Kaitarakihi Point, and the western, Kaiteke Point.

In the early 1860s, the Gibbons family established a dam for kauri logging on the Marama Stream, near modern-day Little Huia. The stream was named after an early resident, Jackie Marama, a Pākehā Māori settler who lived at the mouth of the stream in the 1860s. In the 1880s, the Barr family settled at Little Huia, followed by Edward Turner in 1891. The Barr family constructed a second dam of the Marama Stream in the early 1900s. In 1907, a ferry wharf was built at Little Huia. Members of the Turner family continue to own land near Huia in the present day.

== Demographics ==
Statistics New Zealand considers Little Huia as part of the Huia rural settlement. The SA1 statistical area which corresponds to Little Huia extends north to the Lower Huia Dam, and covers 2.33 km^{2} (0.90 sq mi).

Historical population
Year	Pop.	±% p.a.
2006	126	—
2013	117	−1.05%
2018	126	+1.49%
2023	138	+1.84%

The SA1 statistical area had a population of 138 in the 2023 New Zealand census, an increase of 12 people (9.5%) since the 2018 census, and an increase of 21 people (17.9%) since the 2013 census. There were 69 males and 69 females in 54 dwellings. 6.5% of people identified as LGBTIQ+. The median age was 48.4 years (compared with 38.1 years nationally). There were 18 people (13.0%) aged under 15 years, 21 (15.2%) aged 15 to 29, 78 (56.5%) aged 30 to 64, and 24 (17.4%) aged 65 or older.

People could identify as more than one ethnicity. The results were 97.8% European (Pākehā), 17.4% Māori, 2.2% Pasifika, and 2.2% Asian. English was spoken by 100.0%, Māori language by 2.2%, and other languages by 6.5%. New Zealand Sign Language was known by 2.2%. The percentage of people born overseas was 17.4, compared with 28.8% nationally.

Religious affiliations were 13.0% Christian, 4.3% New Age, and 2.2% other religions. People who answered that they had no religion were 65.2%, and 13.0% of people did not answer the census question.

Of those at least 15 years old, 27 (22.5%) people had a bachelor's or higher degree, 69 (57.5%) had a post-high school certificate or diploma, and 24 (20.0%) people exclusively held high school qualifications. The median income was $44,100, compared with $41,500 nationally. 15 people (12.5%) earned over $100,000 compared to 12.1% nationally. The employment status of those at least 15 was that 60 (50.0%) people were employed full-time, 24 (20.0%) were part-time, and 3 (2.5%) were unemployed.

== Bibliography ==
- Diamond, John T.; Hayward, Bruce W. (1979). The Māori history and legends of the Waitākere Ranges. The Lodestar Press. ISBN 9781877431210.
- Diamond, John T.; Hayward, Bruce W. (1990). "Prehistoric Sites in West Auckland". In Northcote-Bade, James (ed.). West Auckland Remembers, Volume 1. West Auckland Historical Society. pp. 33–41. ISBN 0-473-00983-8.
- Harvey, Bruce; Harvey, Trixie (2009). "That Noble Sheet of Water". In Macdonald, Finlay; Kerr, Ruth (eds.). West: The History of Waitakere. Random House. pp. 87–104. ISBN 9781869790080.
