= Waitākere volcano =

Former volcano in the Auckland Region, New Zealand

Waitākere volcano (also Waitakere volcano, Manukau volcano)
- Stratigraphic range: Miocene, ~23–15 Ma
- Type: Igneous
- Unit of: Northland Volcanic Arc
- Overlies: Murihiku Terrane Greywacke

Lithology
- Primary: Andesite conglomerate and breccia

Location
- Coordinates: 36.9°S 174.3°E
- Region: Auckland
- Country: New Zealand

Type section
- Named for: Waitākere Ranges
- Legend: Key for the volcanics that are shown with panning is: basalt (shades of brown/orange); monogenetic basalts; undifferentiated basalts of the Tangihua Complex in Northland Allochthon; arc basalts; arc ring basalts; dacite; andesite (shades of red); basaltic andesite; rhyolite (ignimbrite is lighter shades of violet); plutonic; White shading is selected caldera features.; Clicking on the rectangle icon enables full window and mouse-over with volcano name/wikilink and ages before present.

The Waitākere volcano, also known as the Manukau volcano, was a Miocene-era volcano that formed off the west coast of the modern Auckland Region of New Zealand's North Island. Erupting intermittently between 23 million and 15 million years ago, the volcano was at one point one of the tallest mountains in New Zealand. The volcano alternated between periods as a seamount and as a volcanic island, before tectonic forces raised the volcano up from the seafloor 17 million years ago. Volcanism at the site ceased 15 million years ago and the cone has mostly eroded, however the modern Waitākere Ranges are formed from the remnants of the volcano's eastern slopes. A number of visible volcanic sites associated with the Waitākere volcano remain around Auckland, including Pukematekeo, Karekare and Lion Rock.

== Geological history ==
The Waitākere volcano began erupting 23 million years ago, beginning life as a seamount adjacent to a deep sedimentary basin. Periodically, the volcano would breach the surface, and be capped by a series of volcanic islands. At its peak, the volcano rose from between 3,000 and 4,000 metres above the sea floor. The volcano had two cones: the major central vent and a smaller cone to the northwest.

The volcano is part of Northland-Mohakatino Volcanic Belt which to the south is still potentially active at Taranaki. This belt forms the western part of a two part extended volcanic arc, which included vents located at the Whangārei Heads, the Hen and Chicken Islands, Whangaroa Harbour, Waipoua Forest and the Kaipara volcano.

17 million years ago, tectonic forces in the Auckland Region changed, and the Waitākere volcano was uplifted from the seafloor. Vulcanism at the site ceased two million years afterwards. The final two vents were along the Scenic Drive ridge and the modern west coast. Lava from these above sea eruptions form the Lone Kauri Formation of rock.

Most of the volcanic cone eroded five million years ago, except for its uplifted eastern slopes, which form the modern Waitākere Ranges. Many remaining volcanic features, such as Lion Rock, are formed from conglomerate rock that is harder and less able to be eroded.

While fossils are rarely found in the Waitākere volcano rocks, some Miocene fossils exist in the Nihotupu Formation of the Manukau Subgroup. These specimens represent deep sea species which lived on the underwater slopes of the volcano.
