= Goldie Bush Scenic Reserve =

Forest in Auckland Region, New Zealand

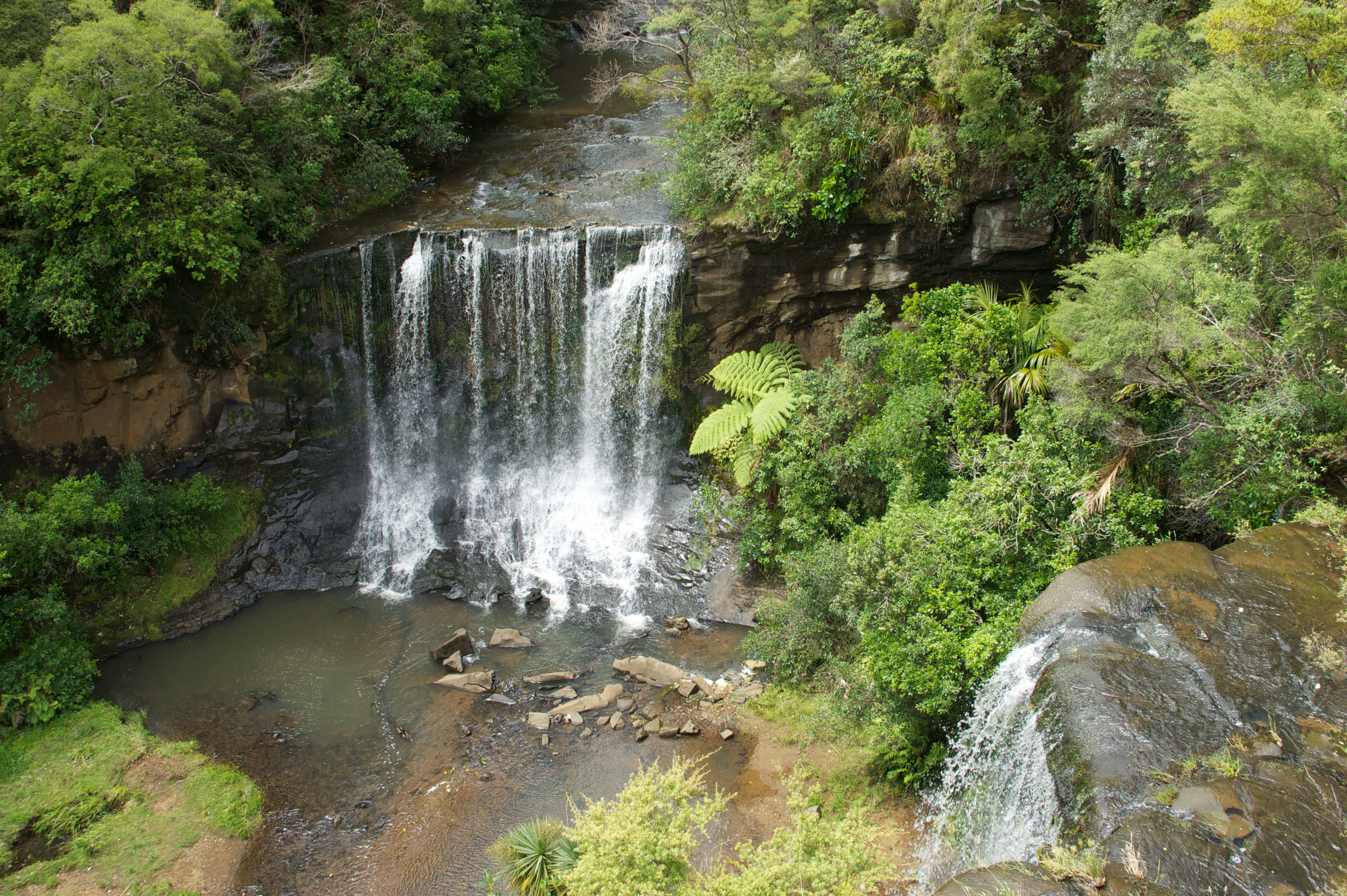
- The Mokoroa Falls in the Goldie Bush Scenic Reserve
- Interactive map of Goldie Bush Scenic Reserve
- Coordinates: 36°50′42″S 174°28′05″E
- Area: 249 ha (620 acres)

The Goldie Bush Scenic Reserve, also known as Goldies Bush and Te Taiapa, is a forested area of West Auckland, New Zealand. Located south-east of Muriwai, the reserve is home to the Mokoroa Falls.

== Geography ==
The Goldie Bush Scenic Reserve is a wooded area of West Auckland, south-east of Muriwai and north of the Waitākere Ranges. The reserve forms much of the Mokoroa Stream valley catchment, which flows southwest towards the Waitākere River near Te Henga / Bethells Beach. Most of the reserve is located within the Waitākere Ranges local board area. The sections north-west of the Mokoroa Stream are a part of the Rodney local board area.

Much of the forest is dominated by kānuka and mamangi trees.

== History ==
The scenic reserve is within the traditional rohe of Te Kawerau ā Maki. The area was known as Te Taiapa, referring to a fortified pā overlooking the Mokoroa Stream, known for being defended by wooden palisades (taiapa), and not by typical defensive ditches. Another name used for the area is Te Patunga ō Te Mokoroa ("the place where Te Mokoroa was killed"), referring to the traditional story where the ancestor Taiaoroa killed Te Mokoroa, a taniwha who lived in the pool at the base of the Mokoroa Falls.

The land was purchased by the mayor of Auckland, David Goldie, around the year 1900, and established a mill on the property. The mill was later relocated closer to the falls, and after the Kauri Timber Company acquired cutting rights in 1920, and the Mokoroa River catchments were dammed, in order to transport logs to the Waitākere River and Te Henga / Bethells Beach, from which they were transported by tramway to the Waitakere railway station. By the time of Goldie's death in 1926, almost no kauri remained on the property at all. After his death, the property was gifted to the Auckland City Council, who developed the area into a scenic reserve.

Since becoming a scenic reserve, kauri trees were re-established in the park. Due to the effects of kauri dieback, the reserve was closed in 2018 in order to stop the spread of disease, and as of 2025 remains closed, as work is completed to develop walking tracks to slow the spread of disease.
