= Lake Kawaupaka =

Lake in New Zealand

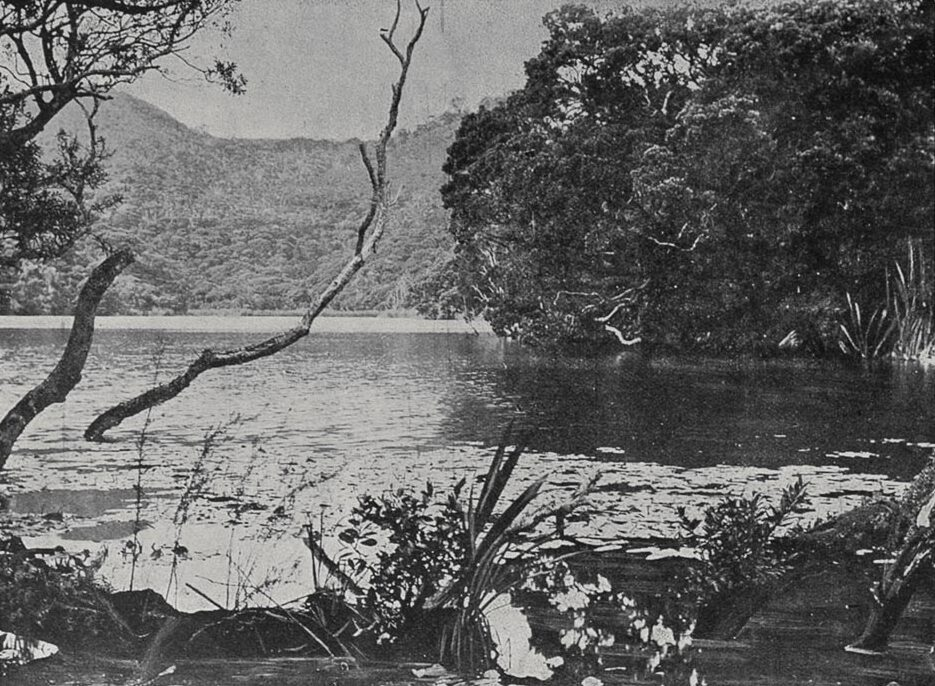
- Lake Kawaupaka in 1904

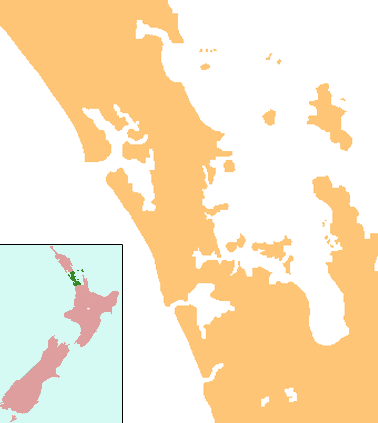
- Location within New Zealand Auckland
- Location: Auckland Region, North Island
- Coordinates: 36°53′40″S 174°27′30″E
- Basin countries: New Zealand
- Max. length: 0.5 km (0.31 mi)
- Max. width: 0.25 km (0.16 mi)

Lake Kawaupaka, also known as Lake Kawaupaku, is a small lake near Te Henga (Bethells Beach) in the Auckland Region of New Zealand. The lake is on private land, and is one of the few dune lakes in the region to be surrounded by native forest. It is located south-west of Lake Wainamu.

== Geology ==
The lake was originally a river valley. 7,200 years ago at the end of the Last Glacial Maximum, when sea-levels began to rise, Te Henga / Bethells Beach began to form, as sand dunes migrated into the river valley. When sand dunes formed a barrier, Lake Kawaupaka began to form as a freshwater lake.

== History ==
The lake is within the traditional rohe of Te Kawerau ā Maki, and was known as Roto Kawaupaku. The name refers to the Little black cormorant (kawaupaka), who were seen as the guardians of the lake. The lake was part of the greater Te Henga / Bethells Beach and Waitākere River area of settlements, with the localities of Tūrapa located on the north shore and, Pākōwhatu to the east of the lake. Pākōwhatu was a pā that used Ngāti Awa fortification techniques, learnt from the Ngāti Awa people as they travelled south past the Waitākere Ranges area towards Kawhia Harbour and Taranaki.

The lake remained mostly undisturbed during European colonisation. During the 19th century, flax was harvested from the lake, and pioneer John Neale Bethell planted an orchard on the lakeside. The lake was purchase din 1979 by the Queen Elizabeth II National Trust, after which it was administered by the Auckland Regional Council as a nature reserve.

== See also ==
- List of lakes in New Zealand
