= Pararaha Stream =

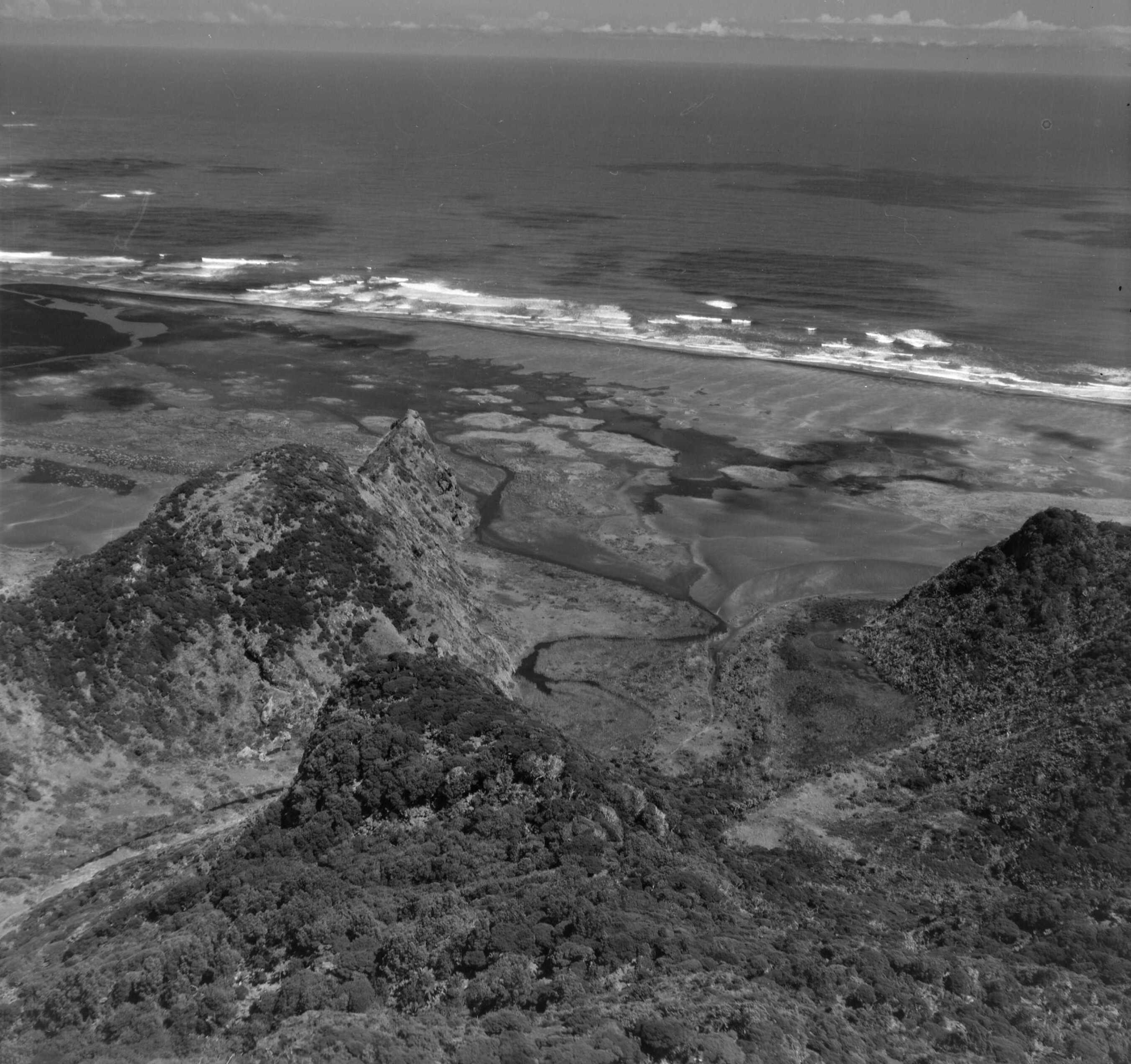
- Aerial view of the Pararaha Stream mouth in 1987

- Mouth of Pararaha Stream Pararaha Stream (New Zealand)
- Route of the Pararaha Stream

Location
- Country: New Zealand
- Region: Auckland Region

Physical characteristics
- Source: Waitākere Ranges
  - coordinates: 36.981°S 174.533°E
- Mouth: Pararaha Bay
  - coordinates: 37.0170°S 174.4765°E

Basin features
- Progression: Pararaha Stream → Pararaha Bay → Tasman Sea
- Tributaries
  - left: Con Bryan Stream, Sykes Gully, Cowan Stream, Walker Stream, Foote Stream, Muir Stream
  - right: Tarati Gully, Waihuna Stream
- Waterfalls: Pararaha Stream Waterfalls

Pararaha Stream is a stream of the Auckland Region of New Zealand's North Island. It flows westwards from its sources in the Waitākere Ranges through the Waitākere Ranges Regional Park, and enters the Tasman Sea at Pararaha Bay, north of Whatipu.

== Geography ==
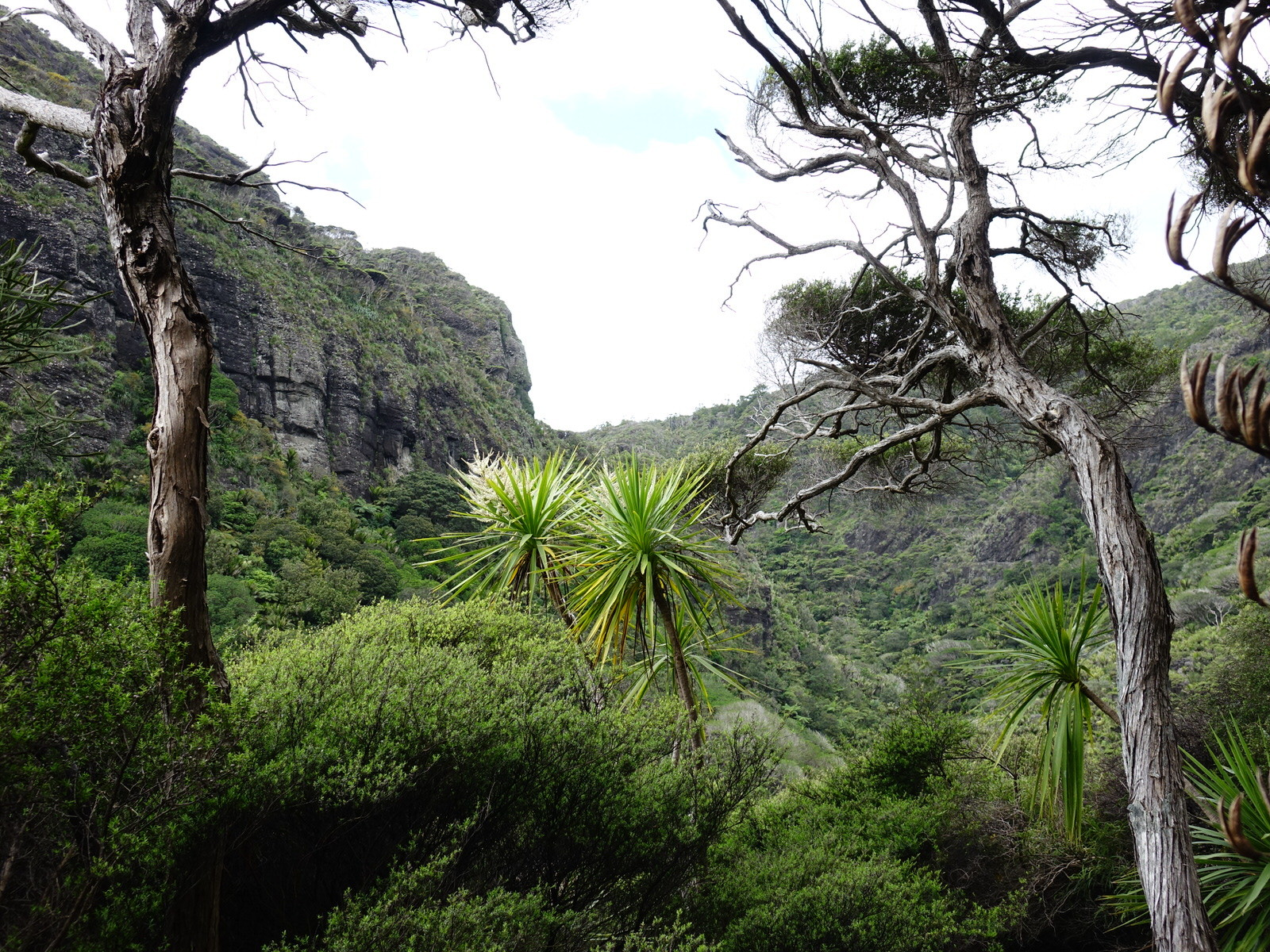
The Pararaha Valley

The stream originates south of the Huia Ridge in the central Waitākere Ranges, northwest of Te Toiokawharu. It flows west then south south-west, joined by tributary streams including the Con Bryan Stream, Cowan Stream, Walker Stream, Foote Stream and Muir Stream. The Pararaha Stream Waterfalls are found along this stretch of the stream, near Baldy. After flowing south past Baldy, the stream changes course, flowing westwards towards Pararaha Bay, where it meets the Waihuna Stream. Pararaha Stream flows into the Tasman Sea after flowing through the Whatipu-Karekare sand dune complex.

The mouth of the stream has varied over time. During the mid-20th century it flowed westwards into the Tasman Sea. Around the year 1987, the stream changed course, flowing south through the Whatipu sand dunes past Te Marotiri ō Takamiro (Cutter Rock) into the Manukau Harbour. The course changed again around the year 2000, resuming its previous course, entering the Tasman Sea west of Pararaha Bay.

Pararaha Point, south of the Pararaha Stream mouth, is an area of volcanic andesite flows originating from the Waitākere volcano.

== History ==
The stream is in the rohe of Te Kawerau ā Maki. A major fortified pā site was found at the mouth of the Pararaha Stream.

In the early 1870s, the mouth of the stream and three further points upstream were dammed by early settler and kauri wood logger William Foote, who constructed a kauri sawmill near the stream mouth. Sawn timber from the mill was transported to Whatipu in the south, and shipped to the port of Onehunga. In 1881, Foote's mill burnt down, after which the mill equipment was moved north to Karekare.

The upper reaches of the Pararaha Stream valley were logged for kauri wood in the 1930s. By 1980, the Pararaha Stream valley was forested with regenerating New Zealand bush, dominated by mānuka scrub.

In May 2018, the Pararaha Valley track was closed due to the effects of kauri dieback. The track was reopened in April 2022 after track improvements mitigating the spread of the disease were constructed.

== Recreation ==
The Pararaha Stream valley is accessible by the Pararaha Valley track and the Zion Ridge Track, the latter of which originated as a Māori overland trail. A campsite accessible by road can also be found at the Pararaha Stream. While the Zion Ridge Track remains closed as of 2024 due to the effects of kauri dieback, the Pararaha Valley campground and Pararaha Valley track are open.

== See also ==
- List of rivers of New Zealand
