= Mokoroa Falls =

Waterfall in New Zealand

Coordinates: 36.8362°S 174.4720°E

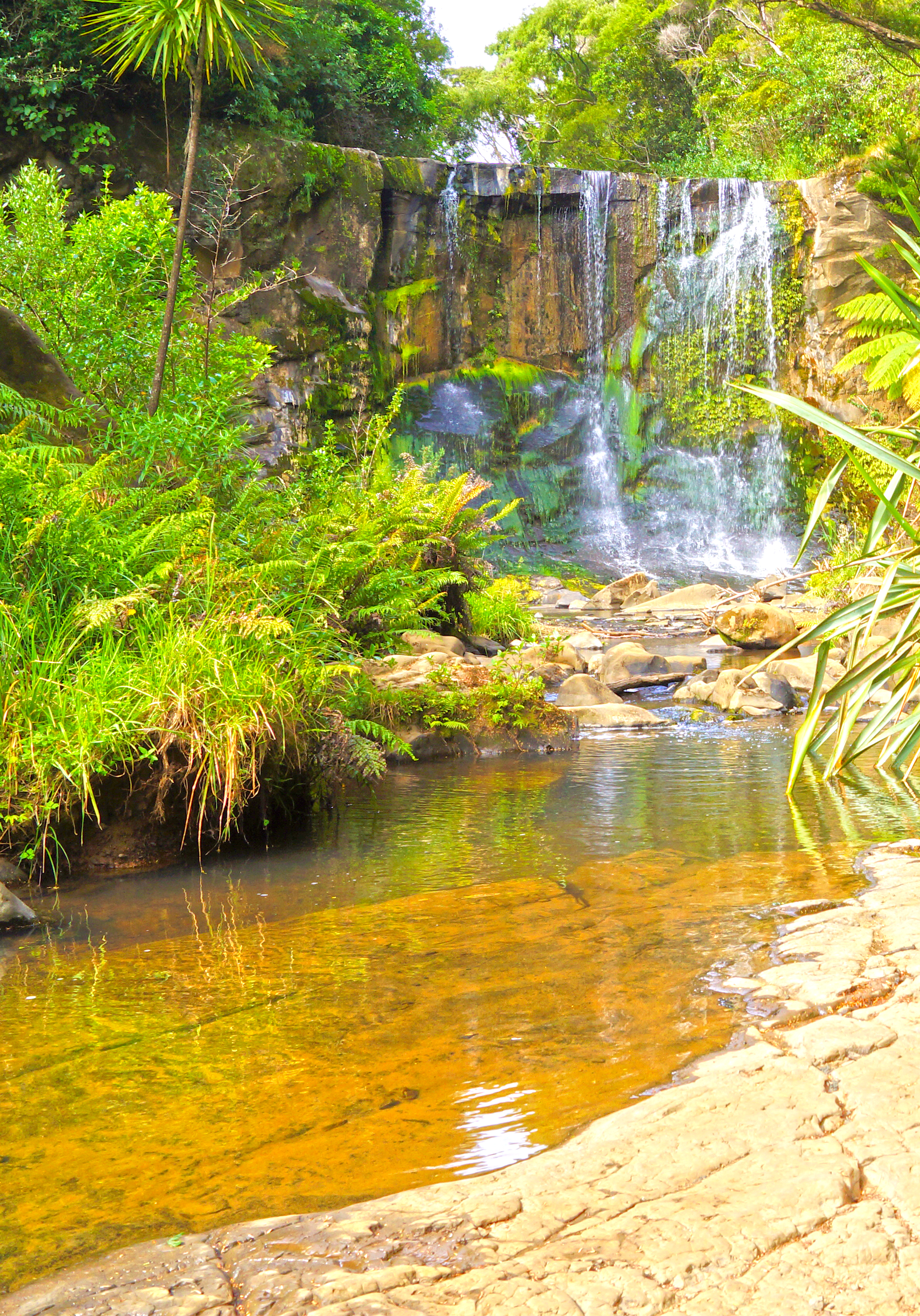
Mokoroa Falls

Mokoroa Falls is a waterfall located between Muriwai and the Waitākere Ranges in Auckland's west coast in New Zealand. It is located in the Goldie Bush Scenic Reserve.

== History ==
The waterfall was traditionally known by the Te Kawerau ā Maki iwi as Wairere. The name Mokoroa ("long lizard") refers to a taniwha, Te Mokoroa. The pool beneath the waterfall was traditionally called Te Rua ō Te Mokoroa, or the lair of Mokoroa. In traditional stories, the ancestor Taiaoroa is credited with killing Te Mokoroa.

Due to the effects of kauri dieback, Goldie Reserve was closed in 2018 in order to stop the spread of disease, and as of 2022 remains closed. During the closure period, the Mokoroa Falls track is being redeveloped, with better infrastructure to better stop the spread of the disease.
