= Waitākere =

Waitākere most commonly refers to:

- Waitākere, Auckland, a rural town north-west of Auckland
- Waitakere City, a former territorial authority which existed from 1989 to 2010
- Waitākere Ranges, a mountain range in West Auckland

Waitākere may also refer to:

- Waitakere City FC, a football club
- Waitākere College, a school in Henderson, New Zealand
- Waitākere (New Zealand electorate), a parliamentary electorate
- Waitakere railway station in Waitākere town
- Waitākere Reservoir in the Waitākere Ranges
- Waitākere River in the Waitākere Ranges
- Waitākere volcano, a former volcano in the Miocene era
- Waitākere ward, a district of Auckland Council
