= Lake Wainamu =

Lake near Auckland, New Zealand

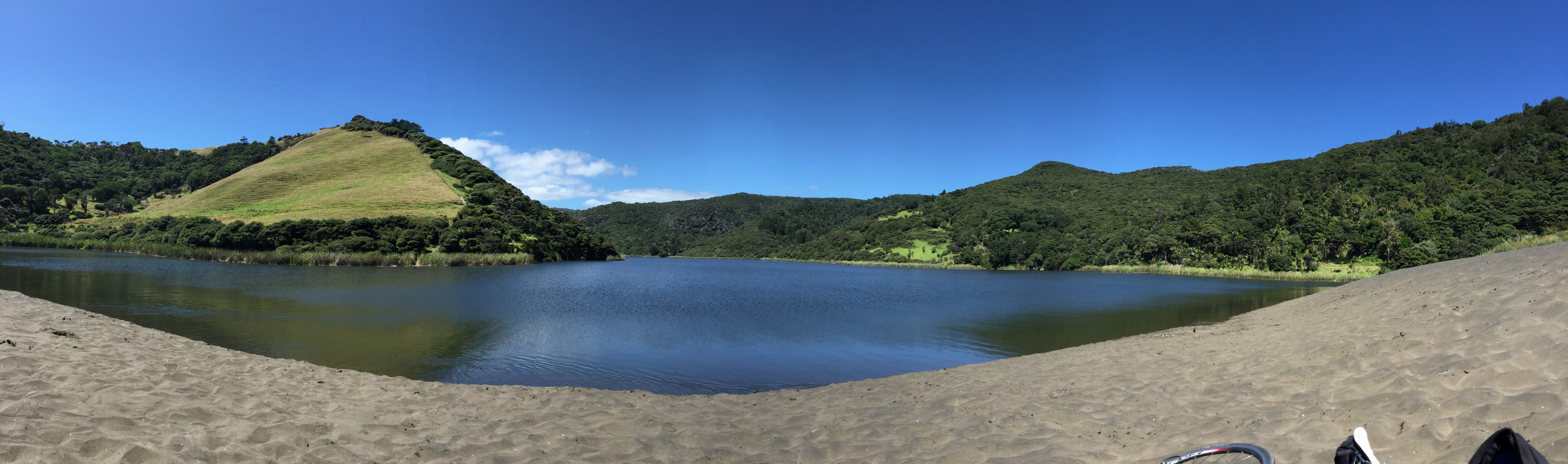
- Lake Wainamu and surrounding sand dunes

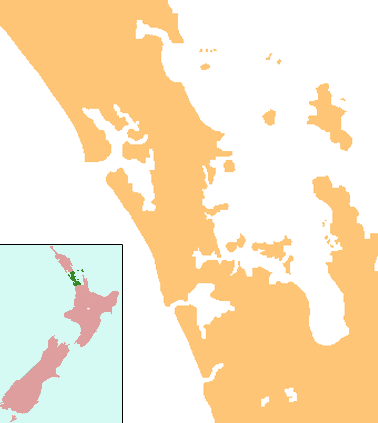
- Location within New Zealand Auckland
- Location: Auckland Region, North Island
- Coordinates: 36.890°S 174.469°E
- Basin countries: New Zealand
- Max. length: 1 km (0.62 mi)
- Max. width: 0.22 km (0.14 mi)

Lake Wainamu is a small lake near Te Henga (Bethells Beach) in the Auckland Region of New Zealand. It is located south-west of Lake Kawaupaka.

== Geography ==
Lake Wainamu is located three kilometres east of the Tasman Sea. It is fed by three streams to the south: the Wainamu Stream, Plum Pudding Stream and the Houghton Gully stream. Traditionally, these were referred to as Waitohi (baptismal rite stream), Waikūkū (kūkupa/kererū stream), and Toetoeroa (referring to the toetoe grass). The mouth of the Wainamu Stream is the location of the Wainamu Falls, also traditionally known as Waitohi. Lake Wainamu drains into the Waitī Stream, a catchment of the Waitākere River.

7,000 years ago, when sea-levels rose after the Last Glacial Maximum, the lake formed a part of the Waitākere River tidal estuary. Over time, Tasman Sea sand accumulated at Te Henga, forming a beach and allowing Lake Wainamu to form as a freshwater dune lake. A decline in water quality was noted in 1990s and was thought to be caused by exotic fish accelerating the loss of the submerged plant life. In response the Auckland Regional Council removed over 9,000 exotic fish (particularly perch, goldfish and rudd) between 2004 and 2007. In 2009, grass carp were introduced to the lake in an attempt to rid it of introduced egeria. The lake is also home to native freshwater fish including banded kōkopu, inanga, common smelt, common bully, grey mullet, longfin and short-finned eel.

== Biodiversity ==
The lake is a breeding ground for the New Zealand pipit, and is a habitat for Spinifex, pīngao, marram grass, pampas and coastal toetoe.

== History ==
The lake is within the traditional rohe of Te Kawerau ā Maki, and was known as Roto Wainamu. The name refers to the sandflies or mosquitos that were commonly found near the lake. The lake was part of the greater Te Henga / Bethells Beach and Waitākere River area of settlements, with the locality of Ōhuhu found on the western shores of the lake, and the fortified pā of Poutūterangi and Te Pae Kākā to the south-east of the lake. Te Pae Kākā was a pā site named after the kākā parrot. Te Kawerau ā Maki rangatira Kowhatukiteuru built two stone pā near Lake Wainamu: Pakowhatu and Koropōtiki.

The lake and the lake's catchment were a site for the kauri logging industry between 1921 and 1925. Streams which fed the lake were dammed, and once water levels were high enough, the logs were flushed downstream to the lake, after which they were transported to the Waitākere railway station.

In 1954, Lake Wainamu and the surrounding land was bought by Happy and Elizabeth Wheeler from landowner Harold Houghton. In the 1970s, the Wheeler family sold the lake to the Queen Elizabeth II National Trust, and the area was opened up to visitors.

== Recreation ==
The lake is accessible by the Lake Wainamu Track. The area surrounding the lake is used for dune surfing.

== Gallery ==
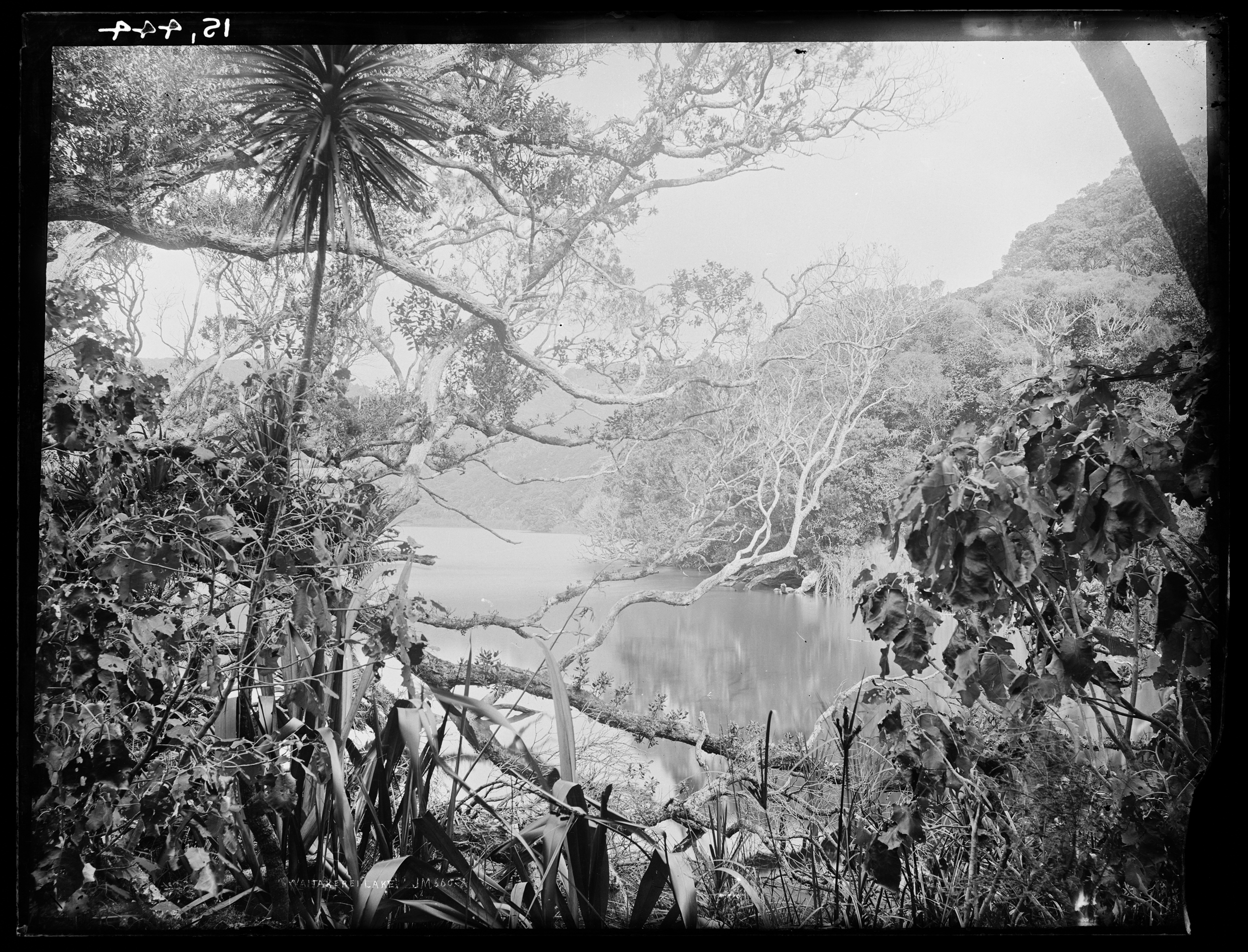
Lake Wainamu in the late 19th or early 20th century

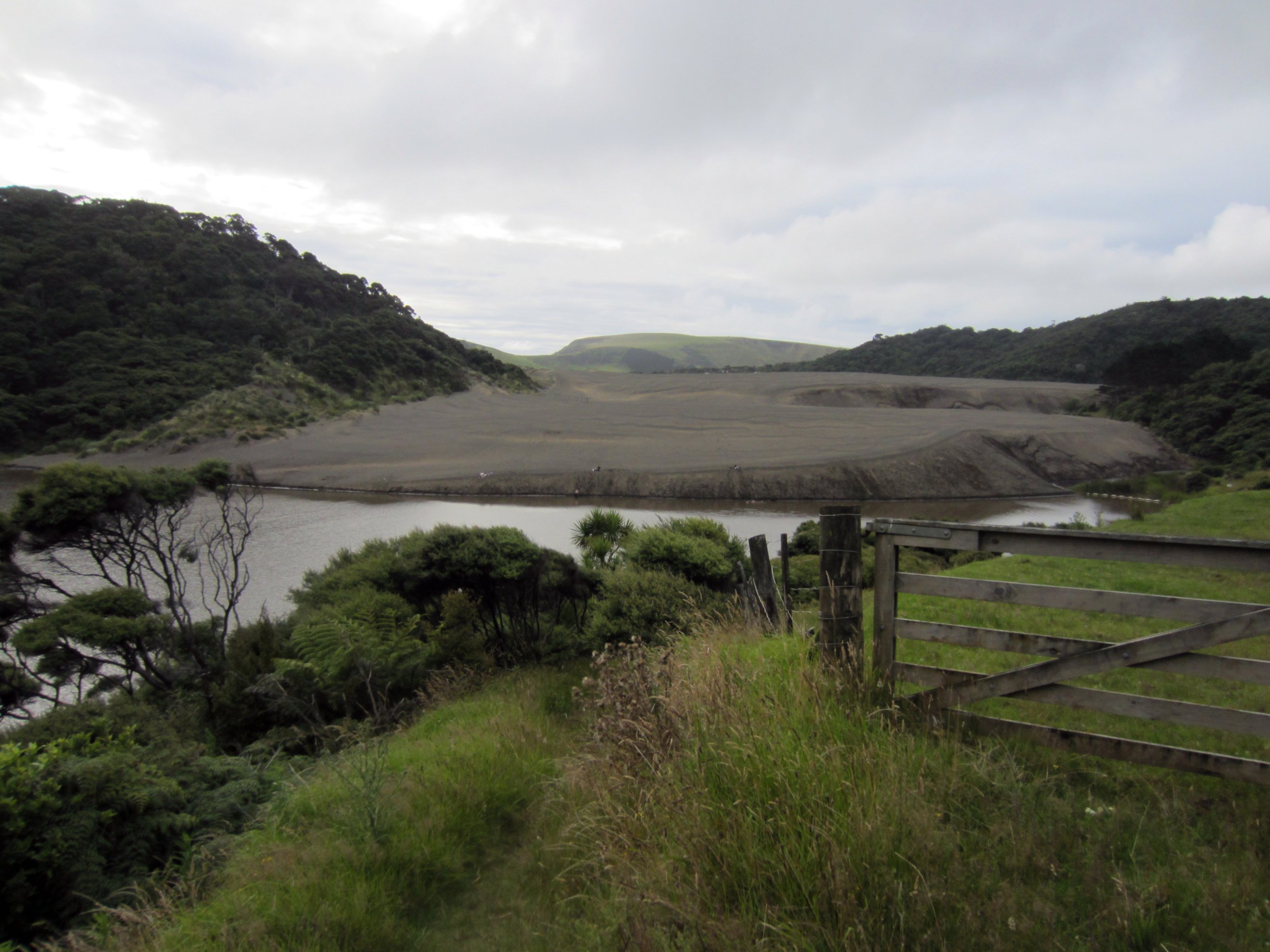
View of Lake Wainamu from the Lake Wainamu Walk

== See also ==
- List of lakes in New Zealand
