= Waitemata County =

Former county of New Zealand

- County of New Zealand
- 1876–1974
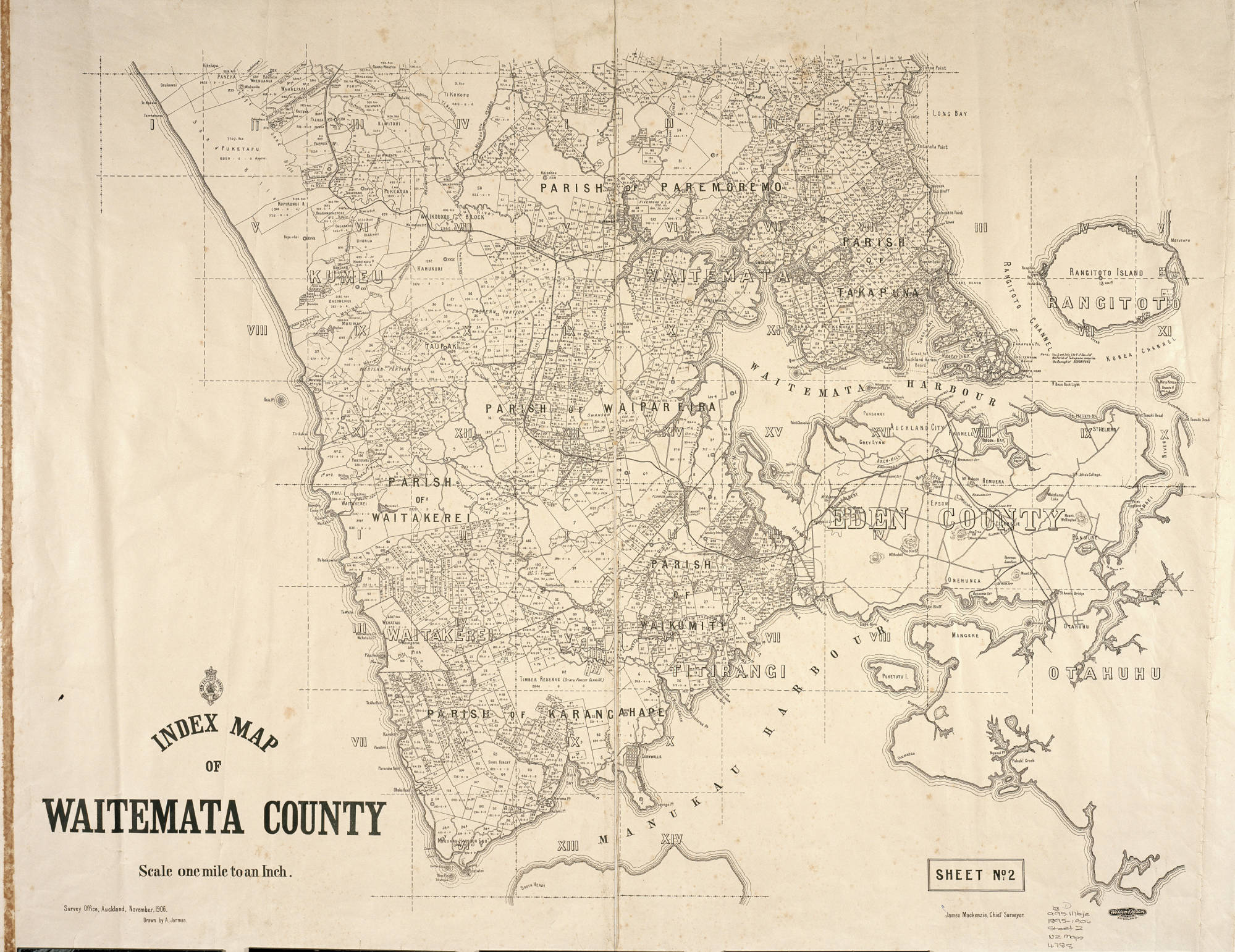
- Map of Waitemata County in 1906
- Population
  - 1970: 96,360
- History
  - Established: 1876
  - Disestablished: 1974
- Today part of: Auckland Region

Waitemata County, historically also known as Waitamata County, was one of the counties of New Zealand in the North Island. Established in 1876, the county covered West Auckland, Rodney and the North Shore. The county shrank in size between 1886 and 1954 when various urban areas on the North Shore and in West Auckland became boroughs and established their own local councils. Waitemata County was dissolved in 1974, with the county council area being taken over by the newly established Waitemata City in the west, and by Takapuna City and Rodney County in the north.

== Geography ==
1951 map of Waitemata County

In 1970 the county covered an area of 384,000 acres (155,000 ha).

The northern boundary with Rodney County was along the Makarau River.

== History ==
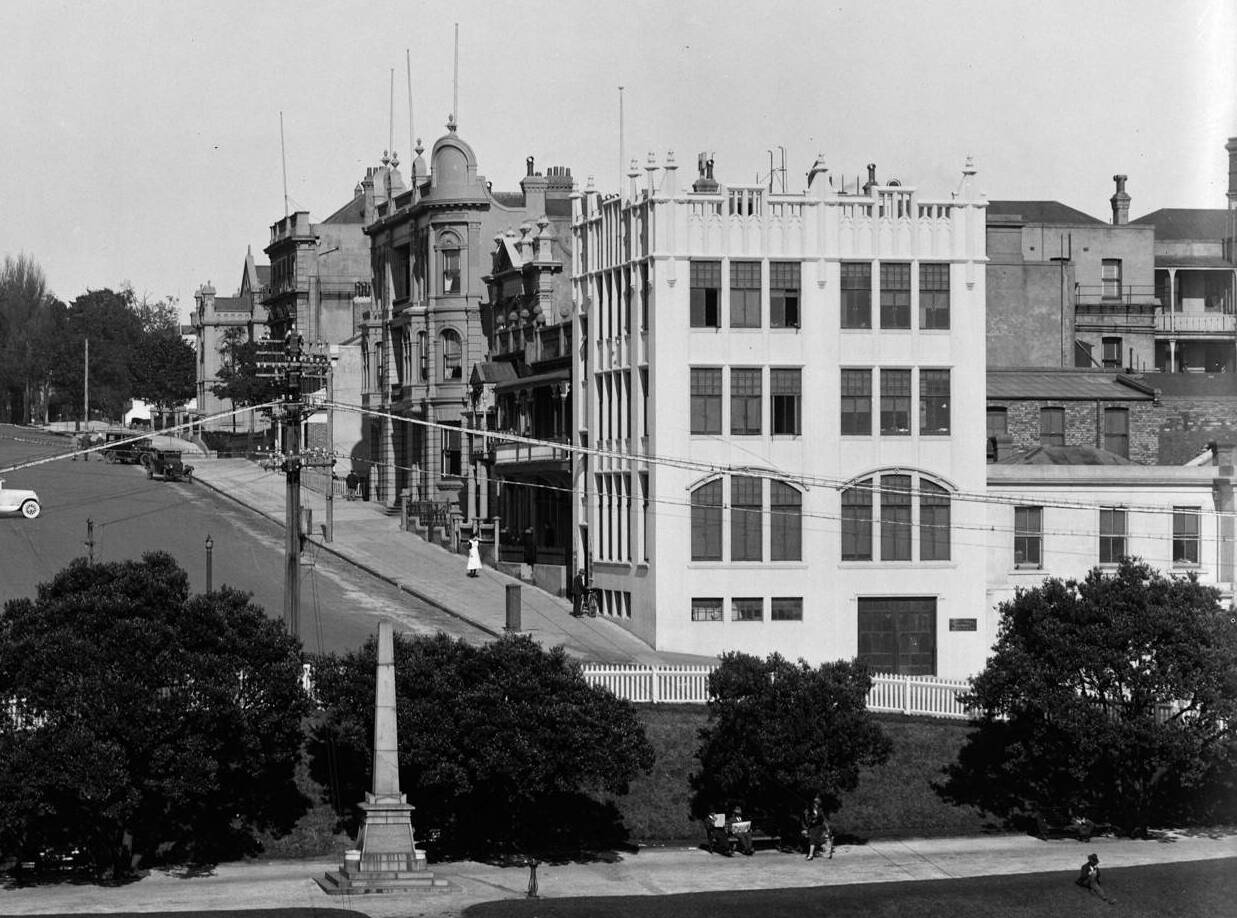
The Waitemata County Council offices, on the corner of Emily Place and Princes Street in 1927

The county was established in 1876, after the abolition of the Auckland Province, and was one of the largest counties created in New Zealand. The county replaced the only previous local government system, which was a series of local road boards, which were established from 1862 onwards. The county was split into six ridings: Ararimu, Manukau, Takapuna, Titirangi, Waitakerei and Weiti. The County Council offices were located at the corner of Emily Place and Princes Street in Auckland, and from February 1923 until 1963 shared the office with the Manukau County Council. From 1967, the council moved to 68 Greys Avenue in Auckland.

In 1881, the Town District Act allowed communities of more than 50 households to amalgamate into a town district. Large town districts were able to form boroughs, which had their own councils and a greater lending power. Between 1886 and 1954, nine boroughs split from the county as the North Shore and West Auckland began to develop: Devonport in 1886, Birkenhead in 1888, Northcote in 1908, Takapuna in 1913, New Lynn in 1929, Henderson in 1946, Helensville in 1947, Glen Eden in 1953 and East Coast Bays in 1954. The remaining county area retained a primarily rural atmosphere until the 1950s. In 1953, Pine Island (now known as Herald Island) joined Waitemata County, previously having no local government.

For most of its existence, Waitemata County was known for being undeveloped and inaccessible. In the 1950s and 1960s, many areas of the county had begun to develop into rural towns and suburbs of Auckland. During this period, district offices were set up in many of these centres, including Titirangi, Te Atatū, Huapai, Silverdale and Glenfield.

Under the Counties Act 1949 Waitemata County established 5 county towns: Green Bay (1958), Titirangi (1958), Kelston West (1959), Glenfield (1961), and Orewa (1962).

In the early 1960s, the Auckland Regional Planning Authority began looking for ways to better develop the county. A 1962 commission recommended replacing the county with a ward-based city in West Auckland, however after six years of appeals, this idea was scrapped. When the dissolution of the county began to be discussed, a new body was proposed for the western North Shore, formed from the growing centres of Albany and Glenfield, which the ARA predicted would have a greater population than Takapuna City by 1986. The new body was voted on and the measure rejected, meaning that Albany and Glenfield would be incorporated into the City of Takapuna instead.

On 1 August 1974, Waitemata City formed from the Titirangi, Te Atatu, Lincoln and Waitakere ridings. The boroughs of New Lynn, Henderson and Glen Eden each decided not to join the new city. The remaining ridings were split between different authorities: Kumeu Riding became a part of Rodney County, while Glenfield, Albany and Long Bay joined Takapuna City.

== Ridings ==
Waitemata County initially had 6 ridings: Ararimu, Weiti, Takapuna, Waitakerei, Manukau, and Titirangi.

== Economy ==
The economy was originally dominated by the timber industry, as land was cleared it was often developed into pasture and agricultural land.

== Associated people ==
- John Henry O'Neill was born at O'Neill's Point to an Irish family in 1852. He attended a Church of England Grammar School and was elected to the Waitakerei Road Board for a term of 5 years in 1878. He later was elected to the Waitemata County Council in 1887 and served as chairman from 1899. O'Neill also served on the Waitemata Licensing Committee.
- Robert Sinclair was born in Perthshire, Scotland. He came to New Zealand and eventually settled in Kaukapakapa purchasing the Eden Vale farm. Sinclair served as chairman of the Kaukapakapa Road Board before later serving as member of the Waitemata County Council from inception until at least 1902. Sinclair also served as chairman of the county council for a year. Sinclair was also a justice of the peace and served as a coroner.
- Alexander Wilson was born in Ayrshire, Scotland, after moving to New Zealand in 1863 he worked for Robert Graham before purchasing his own farm at Birkenhead. Wilson served as chairman of the Birkenhead Road Board before becoming a member of the Waitemata County Council in 1893. Wilson also chairman of a local school committee and served as the president of the local Temperance Society for 25 years.
- Alexander Hatfield was born in Auckland Province in 1867, he was chairman of the Wainui Road Board and the Wainui Licensing Committee before being elected to the Waitemata County Council in 1893, he also was elected to the Waitemata Licensing Committee in 1900. In 1902 Hatfield had yet to lose an election for a local body position.
- Alexander Bruce was born in Aberdeen, Scotland in 1839, Bruce arrived in New Zealand in 1863. In 1884 Bruce was elected to the Northcote Road Board and was first elected to the Waitemata County Council in 1889 for the Northcote Riding. Bruce also served as chairman of the Auckland Hospital and Charitable Aid Board and was a member of the Society of Amalgamated Engineers for more than 40 years.
- Ewen William Alison was elected from the Takapuna Riding in 1900. Alison was also the first mayor of Devonport.
- Alexander Cochran was born in Waikumete in 1869. Cochran was elected to the Waitemata County Council from the Waikumete Riding. Cochran has also served as the vice president of the Waikumete Fruit Growers' Association.
- James Martin Phillipps was born in Auckland in 1862 and educated at Auckland Grammar School. He bred draught horses at his property at Woodhill. Phillipps was elected to the Waitemata County Council in 1899. Phillipps also served as chairman of the Woodhill school committee and for the Helensville Agricultural Society.
- Oliver Mays was born in Leicester, England in 1835. Mays arrived in New Zealand in 1858 and later became appointed to manage a school in Woodside. Mays later moved to manage a school in Devonport before becoming the postmaster of Devonport for 20 years. Mays also served as Chairman of the Devonport Road Board. Mays was elected from the Takapuna Riding in 1877 to the Waitemata County Council and served as chairman until 1887, when he became the treasurer. In 1892 he was elected to the Devonport Borough Council. Mays also served as chairman of the Auckland Hospital and Charitable Aid Board.

== See also ==
- List of former territorial authorities in New Zealand § Counties

== Bibliography ==
- Adam, Jack; Burgess, Vivien; Ellis, Dawn (2004). Rugged Determination: Historical Window on Swanson 1854-2004. Swanson Residents and Ratepayers Association Inc. ISBN 0-476-00544-2.
- Reidy, Jade (2009). "How the West Was Run". In Macdonald, Finlay; Kerr, Ruth (eds.). West: The History of Waitakere. Random House. pp. 237–256. ISBN 9781869790080.
- Rounthwaite, Valerie (1989), The Story of Rural Glenfield, Takapuna: Takapuna City Council, OCLC 37482407, Wikidata Q123499466
