= Kahuitara =

Māori migration canoe

- Great Māori migration waka
- Iwi: Te Kawerau ā Maki

Kahuitara was one of the great ocean-going, voyaging canoes that was used in the migrations that settled New Zealand in Māori tradition.

It landed at Taranaki under the command of Muruiwi. His people settled the area and travelled north.

Te Kawerau ā Maki trace their ancestry back to those who on Kahuitara and other waka, including Tainui, Aotea, Tokomaru and Kurahaupō.

== See also ==
- List of Māori waka
