= Te Henga / Bethells Beach =

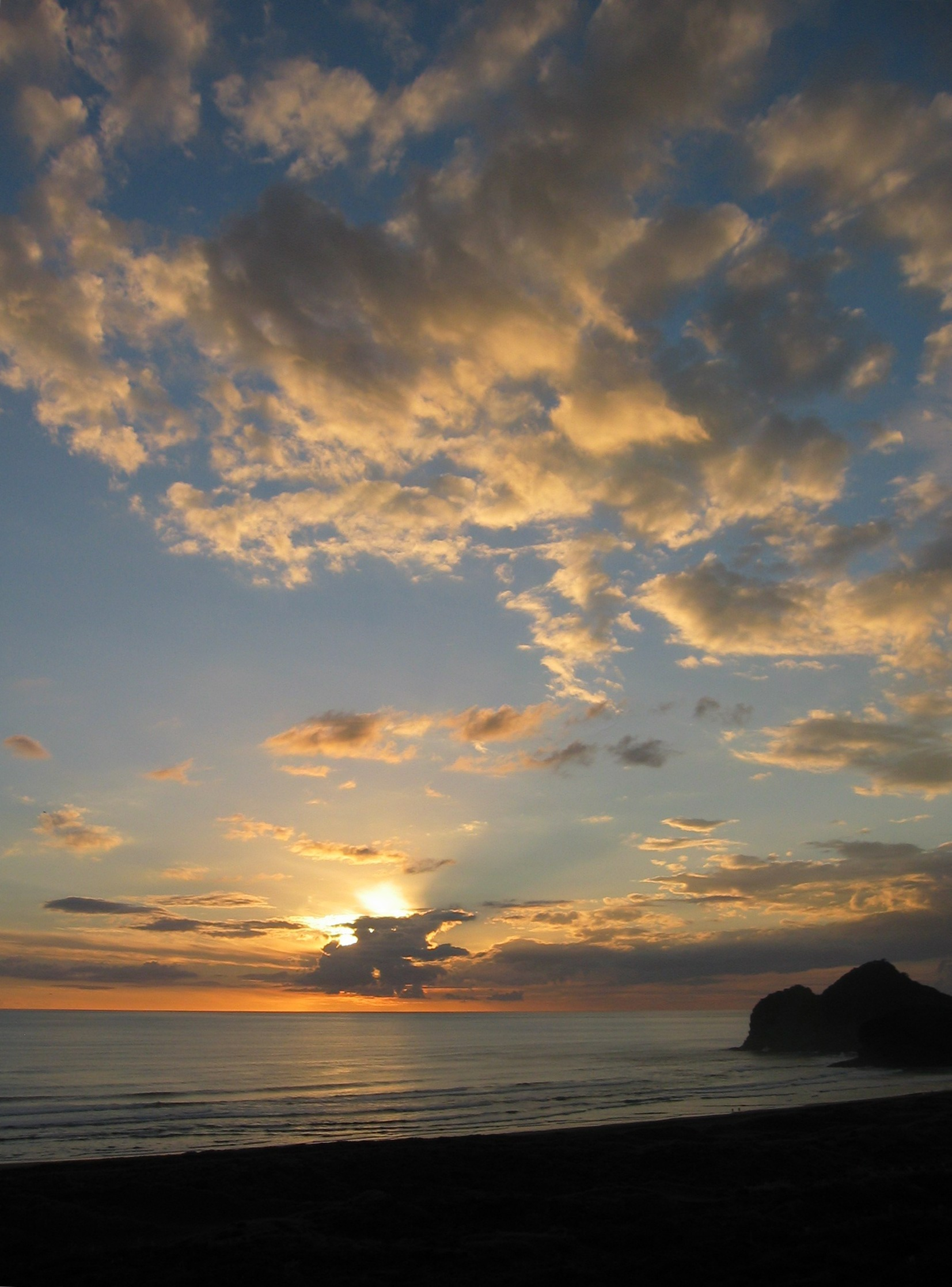
- Sunset at Bethells Beach
- Interactive map of Te Henga / Bethells Beach
- Coordinates: 36°53′25″S 174°27′05″E
- Country: New Zealand
- Region: Auckland
- Ward: Waitākere ward
- Local board: Waitākere Ranges Local Board
- Electorates: Waitākere; Tāmaki Makaurau

Government
  - Territorial Authority: Auckland Council
  - Mayor of Auckland: Wayne Brown
  - Waitākere MP: Vanushi Walters
  - Tāmaki Makaurau MP: Oriini Kaipara

Area
  - Total: 5.37 km^{2} (2.07 sq mi)

Population (June 2025)
  - Total: 260
  - Density: 48/km^{2} (130/sq mi)

Te Henga, or Bethells Beach, is a coastal community in West Auckland, New Zealand. The Māori name for the area, "Te Henga", is in reference to the long foredunes which run along the beach and look like the Henga or gunwale of an upturned waka hull. This name originally applied to a wide area of the lower Waitakere River valley, but during the early 1900s the area became popular with visiting European immigrants who began to refer to the area as "Bethells Beach" after the Bethell Family who live there and still own much of the area. In 1976 the New Zealand Geographic Board officially named the area "Te Henga (Bethells Beach)".

The beach is approximately 37 km (23 mi) west of Auckland City, at the mouth of the Waitakere River where it flows into the Tasman Sea. One of several popular resorts in the area (others include Muriwai, Piha and Karekare), it is rated the 4th most dangerous beach in New Zealand to swim at due to its strong rips and currents. There have been many fatalities including in 2009, Rugby League star Sonny Fai, who was never located.

== History and culture ==
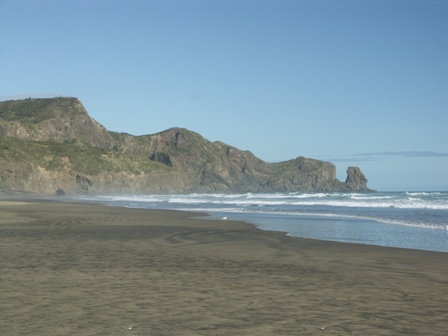
Bethells Beach

The Te Henga Valley shows evidence of human settlement dating back many centuries. Carbon dating of midden shells at Kauwahaia Island date settlement back to at least the year 1600. The cultural history of the area is of archaeologically significant sites, including food gathering areas, pā (fortifications), walkways, canoe landings and sacred places. Te Henga and the Waitākere River have traditionally been major settled areas for the iwi Te Kawerau ā Maki, with many pā found around the islands, headland and inland areas close to Te Henga. A rock in the beach to the north-west of Ihumoana Island is the namesake of Wai-tākere ("cascading water"), which was later applied to the Waitākere River, Ranges, and West Auckland in general.

In the mid-1800s, much of the area (1,180 hectares (2,900 acres)) was designated as the Waitakere and Puketotara Native Reserve. These native reserves were to be ‘inalienable’ for Kawerau people to live on in perpetuity. The provision of the native reserves was largely undermined by the Native Land Court, created in 1865, which was based on the settlers' legal system, and converted customary title to land into individual title. Over the following decades much of the land was sold to European immigrants. The arrival of Europeans in the 19th century led to major changes in the character and shape of Te Henga (Bethells Beach). The most significant of these changes was the clearing of the land for timber and pastoral farming which began in 1854 and continued until the 1920s. In addition, a dam was constructed on the Waitakere River in the 1920s, drastically altering the level of the riverbed and reducing the outflow of water to the sea. Prior to the dam being constructed, the Waitākere River catchment at Te Henga was a site where New Zealand flax was harvested.

In excerpts from a letter of 23 September 1853, Henry Waterhouse of Waiti described the wreck of the barque Helena, near the mouth of the Waitakere River at Te Henga. Heavy seas and the incoming tide had caused the barque to break in two, resulting in the loss of seven lives including the captain. Four survivors were rescued by two Kawerau Māori men returning from pig hunting, who cared for them for several days before escorting them to Auckland.

John Bethell negotiated with the Waitemata County Council to sell the land that is now known as Te Henga Park. The Council considered the beach and park area would provide excellent recreation facilities for residents of Auckland. Te Henga was recognised as a place of regional significance.

Te Henga / Bethells Beach was the location where feminist artist Juliet Batten performed 100 Women Performance in 1985.

In early 2023, the Auckland Anniversary floods and Cyclone Gabrielle resulted in the Waitākere River flooding, causing major damage to roads, bridges and houses in the area. Sections of the Te Henga Walkway were destroyed when cliffs collapsed. Part of the walkway was reopened in November 2024.

== Demographics ==
Statistics New Zealand describes Bethells Beach as a rural settlement, which covers 5.37 km^{2} (2.07 sq mi) and had an estimated population of 260 as of June 2025, with a population density of 48 people per km^{2}. The settlement is part of the larger Muriwai Valley-Bethells Beach statistical area.

Historical population for Bethells Beach settlement
| Year | Pop. | ±% p.a. |
|---|---|---|
| 2006 | 261 | — |
| 2013 | 255 | −0.33% |
| 2018 | 264 | +0.70% |
| 2023 | 255 | −0.69% |

Bethells Beach had a population of 255 in the 2023 New Zealand census, a decrease of 9 people (−3.4%) since the 2018 census, and unchanged since the 2013 census. There were 123 males, 132 females and 3 people of other genders in 108 dwellings. 5.9% of people identified as LGBTIQ+. The median age was 47.8 years (compared with 38.1 years nationally). There were 36 people (14.1%) aged under 15 years, 39 (15.3%) aged 15 to 29, 135 (52.9%) aged 30 to 64, and 39 (15.3%) aged 65 or older.

People could identify as more than one ethnicity. The results were 95.3% European (Pākehā); 14.1% Māori; 7.1% Pasifika; 1.2% Asian; and 2.4% Middle Eastern, Latin American and African New Zealanders (MELAA). English was spoken by 98.8%, Māori language by 1.2%, Samoan by 1.2%, and other languages by 10.6%. The percentage of people born overseas was 21.2, compared with 28.8% nationally.

Religious affiliations were 9.4% Christian, 1.2% Hindu, 1.2% Māori religious beliefs, 1.2% Buddhist, 2.4% New Age, and 1.2% other religions. People who answered that they had no religion were 75.3%, and 8.2% of people did not answer the census question.

Of those at least 15 years old, 51 (23.3%) people had a bachelor's or higher degree, 111 (50.7%) had a post-high school certificate or diploma, and 30 (13.7%) people exclusively held high school qualifications. The median income was $43,300, compared with $41,500 nationally. 21 people (9.6%) earned over $100,000 compared to 12.1% nationally. The employment status of those at least 15 was that 111 (50.7%) people were employed full-time, 36 (16.4%) were part-time, and 6 (2.7%) were unemployed.

=== Muriwai Valley-Bethells Beach statistical area ===
Muriwai Valley-Bethells Beach statistical area, which does not include Muriwai settlement, covers 35.36 km^{2} (13.65 sq mi) and had an estimated population of 1,110 as of June 2025, with a population density of 31 people per km^{2}.

Historical population for the statistical area
| Year | Pop. | ±% p.a. |
|---|---|---|
| 2006 | 825 | — |
| 2013 | 945 | +1.96% |
| 2018 | 1,104 | +3.16% |
| 2023 | 1,089 | −0.27% |

Muriwai Valley-Bethells Beach had a population of 1,089 in the 2023 New Zealand census, a decrease of 15 people (−1.4%) since the 2018 census, and an increase of 144 people (15.2%) since the 2013 census. There were 528 males, 555 females and 3 people of other genders in 378 dwellings. 3.6% of people identified as LGBTIQ+. The median age was 42.9 years (compared with 38.1 years nationally). There were 225 people (20.7%) aged under 15 years, 150 (13.8%) aged 15 to 29, 552 (50.7%) aged 30 to 64, and 162 (14.9%) aged 65 or older.

People could identify as more than one ethnicity. The results were 95.0% European (Pākehā); 13.2% Māori; 3.6% Pasifika; 3.3% Asian; 0.8% Middle Eastern, Latin American and African New Zealanders (MELAA); and 1.7% other, which includes people giving their ethnicity as "New Zealander". English was spoken by 98.3%, Māori language by 1.4%, Samoan by 0.3%, and other languages by 8.8%. No language could be spoken by 1.4% (e.g. too young to talk). New Zealand Sign Language was known by 0.6%. The percentage of people born overseas was 19.3, compared with 28.8% nationally.

Religious affiliations were 15.7% Christian, 0.3% Hindu, 0.3% Islam, 0.3% Māori religious beliefs, 0.3% Buddhist, 0.8% New Age, and 1.1% other religions. People who answered that they had no religion were 73.0%, and 8.0% of people did not answer the census question.

Of those at least 15 years old, 189 (21.9%) people had a bachelor's or higher degree, 474 (54.9%) had a post-high school certificate or diploma, and 126 (14.6%) people exclusively held high school qualifications. The median income was $45,400, compared with $41,500 nationally. 153 people (17.7%) earned over $100,000 compared to 12.1% nationally. The employment status of those at least 15 was that 441 (51.0%) people were employed full-time, 159 (18.4%) were part-time, and 27 (3.1%) were unemployed.

== Geology ==
7,000 years ago, when sea-levels rose after the Last Glacial Maximum, Te Henga / Bethells Beach and the surrounding area including Lake Wainamu formed a part of the Waitākere River tidal estuary. Over time, Tasman Sea sand accumulated at Te Henga, forming sand dunes and freshwater lakes. The sand dunes have accumulated in several phases over the last 4,500 years. These sands contain quantities of black titanomagnetite derived from the volcanic rocks of Taranaki and carried north by coastal currents. The dunes continually move in a dynamic coastal process. There are three dune-impounded lakes: Lake Wainamu, Lake Kawaupaku and Lake Waiataru.

The Te Henga wetlands originally formed as a freshwater lake during the same time period as the three remaining lakes. The lake was destroyed in 1910 with the construction of the Waitākere Dam and Reservoir, which made water-levels rise and the water to become more silty. The wetlands began forming in the mid-1920s.

== Ecology of the Waitakere River catchment ==
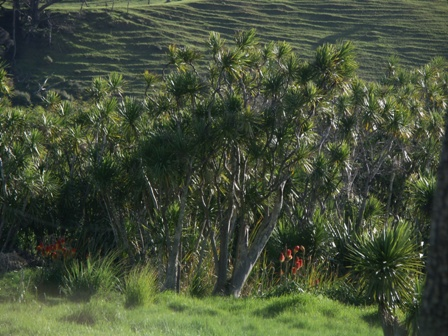
Cabbage trees

The Waitākere River catchment consists of roughly 70 km^{2} of the bush-clad Waitākere Ranges. Located on the west coast of the Auckland Region approximately 75% of the catchment consists of native vegetation in spite of extensive milling, farming and settlement.

The major features of the catchment are:

- the abundance of native vegetation
- the steep and rugged terrain
- the Te Henga wetland
- the sand dunes
- Lake Wainamu
- The Waitākere Reservoir

The Waitakere River has two main tributaries, the Mokoroa and Waiti streams. The headwaters of the river are in the vast and steep Waitākere Ranges and drain out at the Bethell's Beach river mouth.

In comparison with other North Island beaches, and to some extent even the west coast beaches of Muriwai and Piha, settlement at Bethells has been minor with most development revolving around horticulture and agriculture.

With the exception of the Waitākere Reservoir the catchments resources have largely escaped development.

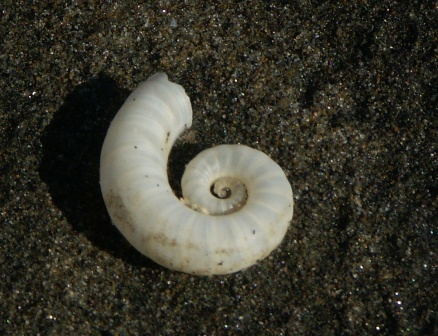
West coast shell

In 1990 the Auckland Regional Water Board developed and prepared a Waitakere River Catchment Water and Soil Plan. This pre-Resource Management Act document aimed to deal with the competing water and soil resource demands within the catchment in terms of "conservation, allocation, use and quality of natural water and in terms of soil conservation and preventing damage from flooding." Although this document reached its quarter-century in 2015, many of its principles still apply.

== Activity ==
- Surfing is the main pastime. Other pastimes include parasailing and hang gliding, for which the prevailing westerly wind often provides favourable conditions.
- Fishing is also popular, although dangerous in many places and many deaths have taken place from this.
- Bush walking is encouraged, with boardwalks in place.
- Sunbathing, swimming, picnics, running etc.
- Skimboarding is also becoming quite popular with young people.

== Filming location ==
The beach has been used as a filming location for several projects, one of the earliest being a four-month shoot for award-winning drama series Children of Fire Mountain (1979). Other shoots include the music video for Shania Twain's single "Forever and for Always"(2003), "Out of the Woods" for Taylor Swift, TV series The New Adventures of Black Beauty and The Wilds, Brit/New Zealand TV movie The Man Who Lost His Head, and episodes of Xena: Warrior Princess, Young Hercules, and Hercules: The Legendary Journeys. Battle scenes for New Disney Channel Original movie Avalon High were also filmed there. In addition, K-pop singer Taeyeon's first solo music video I, and the end scenes of Crouching Tiger, Hidden Dragon: Sword of Destiny were also filmed here.
