= Waitākere Reservoir =

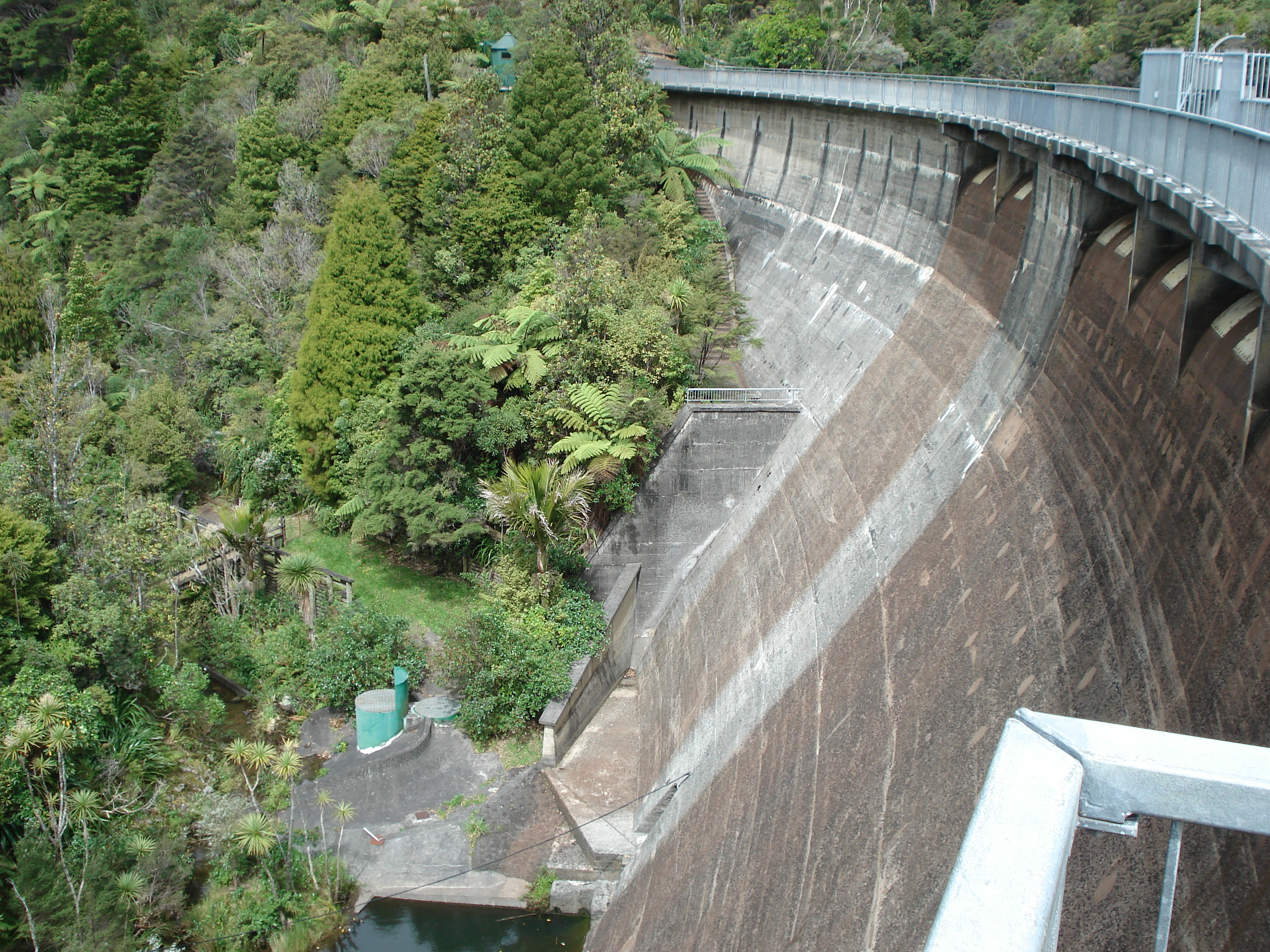
- Waitākere Dam from above

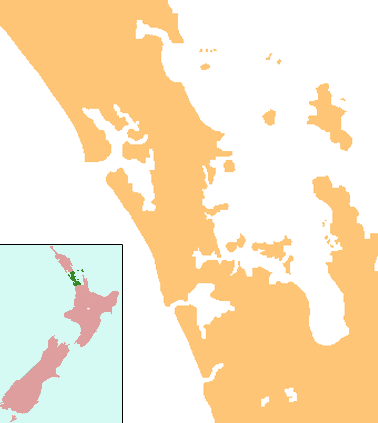
- Location within New Zealand Auckland
- Location: Waitākere, Auckland, North Island
- Coordinates: 36°54′08″S 174°31′31″E
- Type: Reservoir
- Basin countries: New Zealand
- Surface area: 25.1 ha (0.097 sq mi)
- Water volume: 1,760,000 m^{3} (0.00042 cu mi)

Waitākere Reservoir is a reservoir on the Waitakere River in the Waitākere Ranges, west of Auckland in New Zealand. The dam was completed in 1910 and is a concrete gravity dam with a slight curvature. It has a lake area of 25.1 hectares and a capacity of 1.76 million cubic metres. The dam is accessible from the Montana Heritage Trail, a bush hike in the region.

== History ==
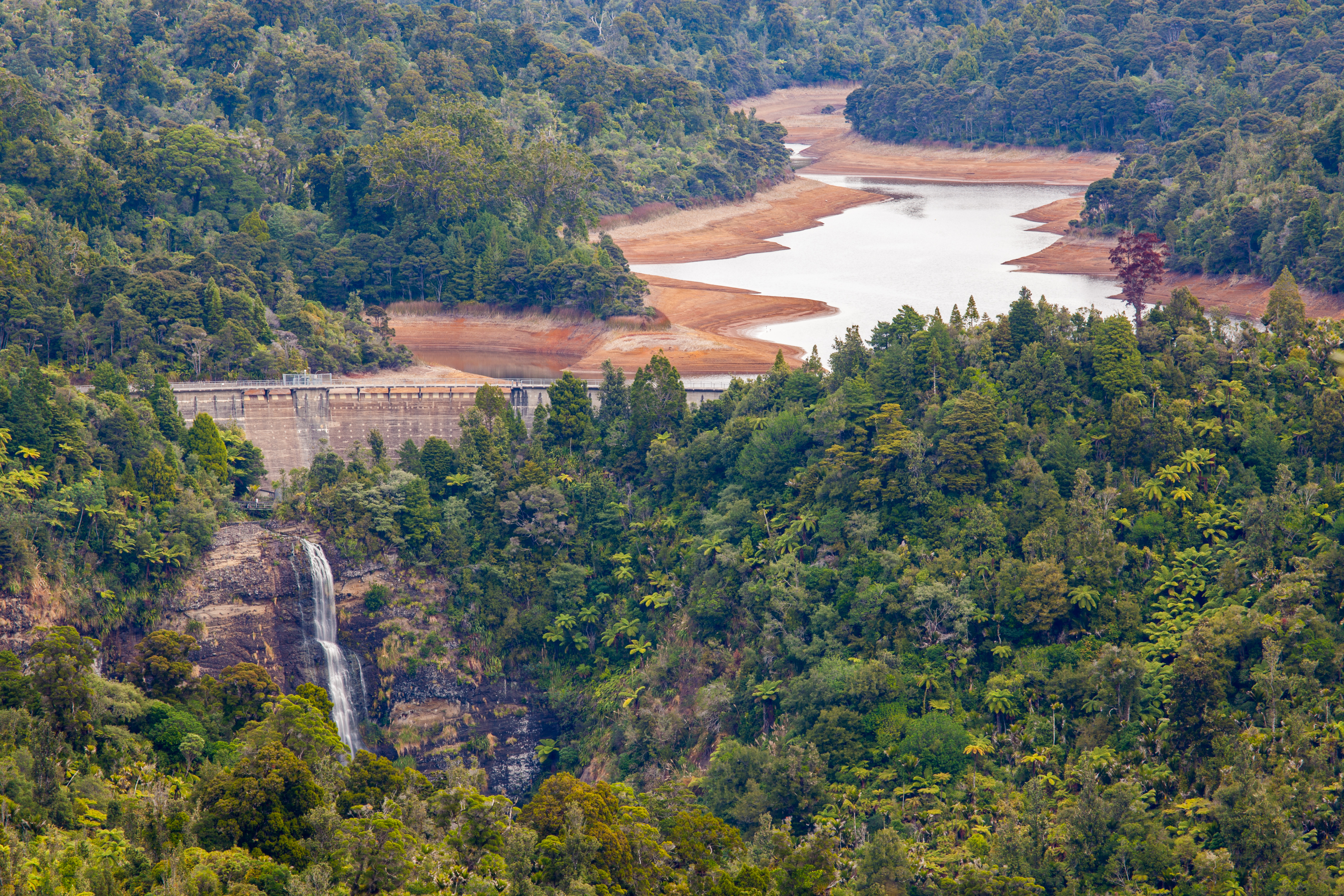
Waitākere Dam and reservoir, during the 2013 drought

By the late 19th century, Auckland City was plagued with seasonal water droughts. A number of options were considered to counter this, including the construction of water reservoirs in the Waitākere Ranges. The Waitākere Dam was first of a number of dams in the ranges to counteract this issue. In 1905, a decision was made to dam the Waitākere River at the location of the Waitākere Falls, then a popular tourist site. The township of Swanson was a major source of labour for the project. A tramway was constructed between the Waitākere Falls site and the township, in order to transport supplies from the Swanson railway station. By 1907, the tramline and pipeline tunnels had been completed, connecting the future dam to a reservoir at Ponsonby. Thomas Billington & Sons' tender to construct the concrete dam was accepted in May 1907. The concrete foundations began construction in 1908.

The dam project suffered a major setback in May 1910, when a torrential rain caused a landslip upstream of the dam. The landslip caused the dam to burst, flooding the Waitākere River valley and scattering timber and construction tools. Despite the setback, the gap in the dam was mended, and the dam was completed by December 1910. Between 1926 and 1928 the dam was raised an additional five metres in height. During the same period, a filtration station was built at Swanson by a Dalmatian New Zealander work force. The filtration station continues to be used today.

The construction of the Waitākere Dam permanently reduced the flow of the Waitākere River, greatly impacting the Te Kawerau ā Maki community at Te Henga / Bethells Beach. Between the 1910s and 1950s, most members of Te Kawerau ā Maki moved away from their traditional rohe in search of employment or community with other Māori.

In 1991, the dam was emptied entirely, so that work could be done to strengthen the dam wall. This was completed in early 1993.

In 1976, the Waitakere Tramline Society was formed, which offered tourist tram rides along the remaining section of the Waitakere Tramline. This continued until 24 November 2014, when the tramline was closed due to safety concerns.
