= Waitākere River =

River in the Auckland Region, New Zealand

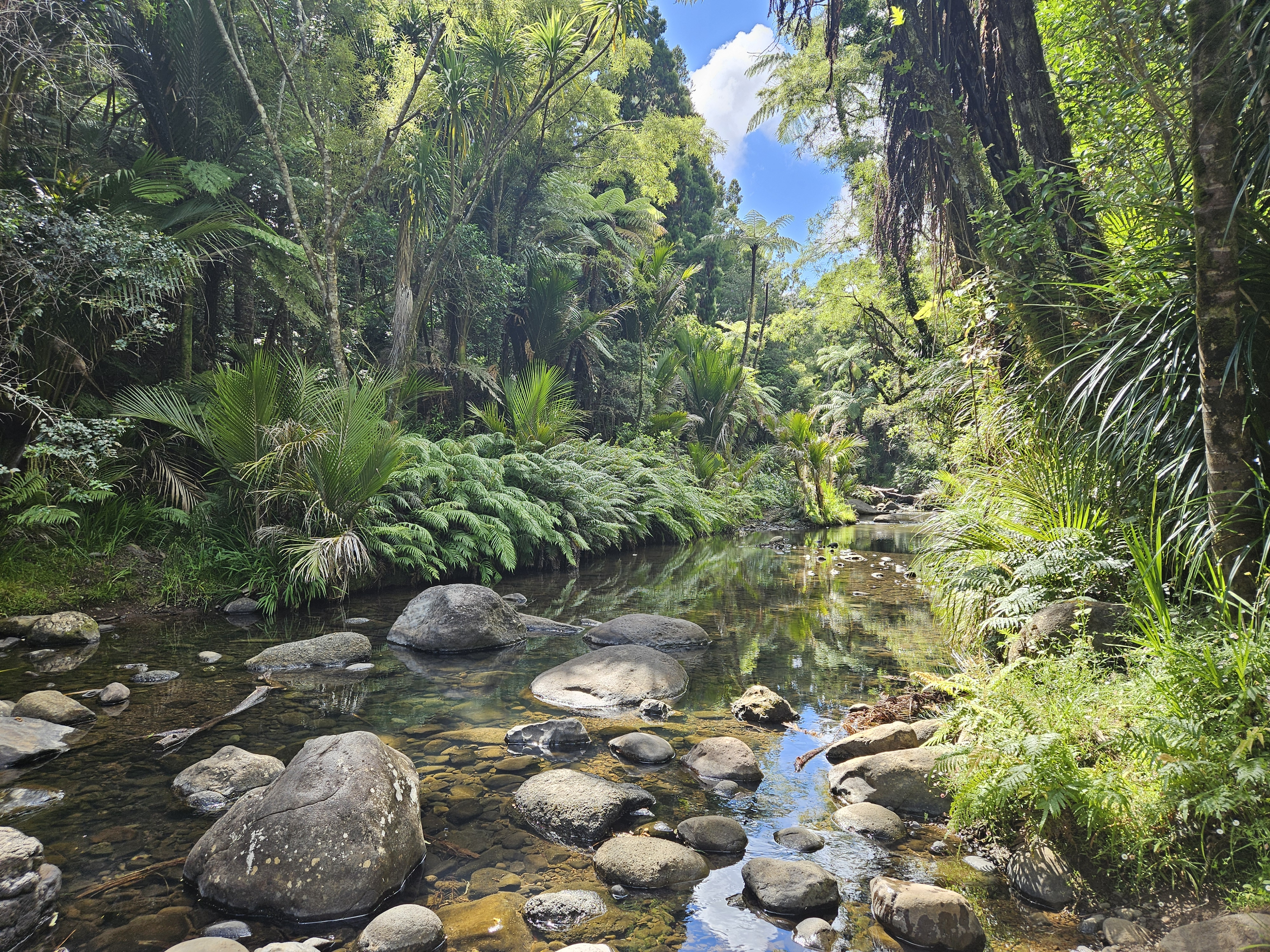
- The Waitākere River at Te Piringa / Cascade Kauri in the Waitākere Ranges Regional Park

- Mouth of the Waitākere River Waitākere River (New Zealand)
- Route of the Waitākere River

Location
- Country: New Zealand
- Region: Auckland Region

Physical characteristics
- Source
  - location: Waitākere Reservoir
  - coordinates: 36.89952°S 174.52935°E
- Mouth: Tasman Sea
  - coordinates: 36.89142°S 174.44269°E
- Length: 16 km (10 mi)

Basin features
- Progression: Waitākere River → Tasman Sea
- Landmarks: Te Henga / Bethells Beach
- Tributaries
  - left: Cascade Stream, Bacon Stream, Maioha Stream, Wipene Stream, Koropotiki Stream, Brissenden Stream, Waiti Stream
  - right: Kelly Stream, Toetoeroa Stream, Anderson Stream, Waitupu Stream, Mokoroa Stream
- Waterbodies: Te Henga Wetland
- Waterfalls: Waitākere Falls

The Waitākere River is a river of the Auckland Region of New Zealand's North Island. It flows north then west from its sources in the Waitākere Ranges, reaching the Tasman Sea at Te Henga / Bethells Beach, to the south of Muriwai Beach. The upper reaches of the river are dammed to form the Waitākere Reservoir. The Waitākere Falls, just below the dam, are 95 metres (312 ft) high and the third highest waterfall in the North Island.

== Geography ==
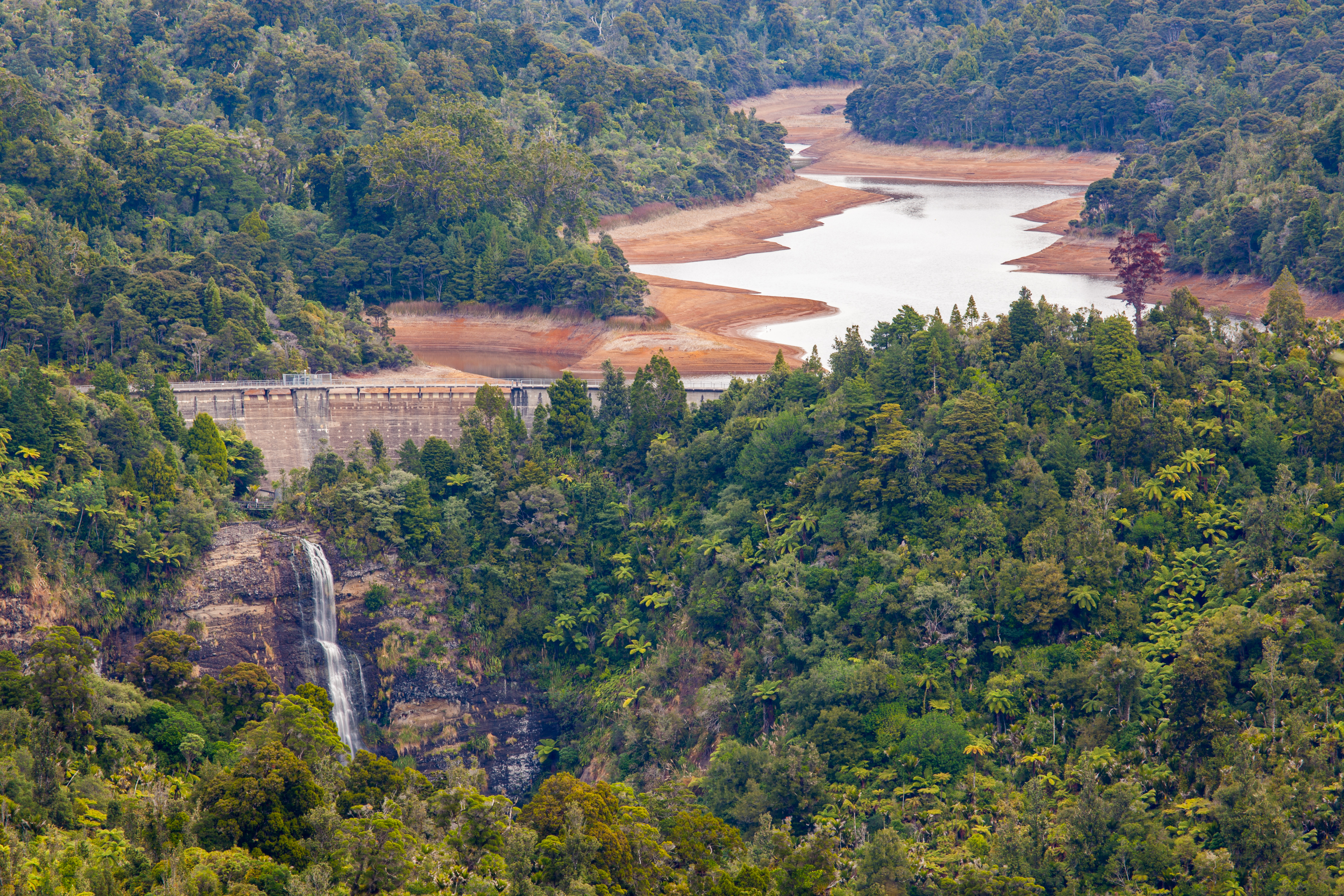
The Waitākere Reservoir and the Waitākere Falls, pictured during a period of drought in 2013

The stream originated in the Waitākere Reservoir in the Waitākere Ranges, and begins flowing northwards after leaving the Waitākere Dam. The Waitākere Falls can be found on the river adjacent to the dam. The stream flows northwest through the Waitākere Ranges and is joined by a number of tributary streams, including the Cascade Stream, the location of a waterfall known as the Cascades, and an unnamed tributary stream where the Waitoru Falls are located. After exiting the Waitākere Ranges Regional Park and meeting the Waitupu Stream, the Waitākere River flows westwards until it become a wetland, and flows into the Tasman Sea at Te Henga / Bethells Beach.

== History ==
The river was a central point for Te Kawerau ā Maki Māori, who originally called the lower section of the river Te Awa Kōtuku, or the White heron's Plume River, and the upper section Waikirikiri. The name Te Awa Kōtuku was a reference to the Waitākere Falls. The area was the most densely settled area of West Auckland, and the river banks were the locations of many Te Kawerau ā Maki kāinga, such as Ōhutukawa near Lake Wainamu, Motu, Ōkaihau, Raumati, Pihāriki, Parawai, and Waitī. In Te Kawerau ā Maki legend, the river is home to a malevolent taniwha named Te Mokoroa.

While the river currently flows into the Tasman Sea south of Ihumoana Island at Te Henga / Bethells Beach, the river previously flowed north of the island, over-top of a rock named Waitākere ("cascading water"). The mouth of the river ("Te Puaha o Waitākere") began to be known as Waitākere during the early 18th century, after the death of an important chief whose body was laid on the rock. Over time, Te Kawerau ā Maki began referring to the entire river by the name Waitākere.

The upper Waitākere River was first milled for kauri timber from the 1870s, with bullock carts transporting timber to Auckland along clay tracks and barges. The opening of the North Auckland railway between Auckland and Helensville in 1881 opened up the upper Waitākere River area for more intensive logging. In the late 1880s, a small sawmill operated in the Waitākere River valley.

During the late 19th and early 20th centuries, the Waitākere Falls was one of the most popular tourist attractions in the Waitākere Ranges, until the construction of the Waitākere Dam in 1910 severely reduced the water volume. The dam was constructed to solve successive drinking water crises faced by the city of Auckland. It caused a major drop in the volume of the river, stopping the river from being able to be navigated by canoe, reduced the water quality levels, and significantly affecting the availability of fish and other river resources, negatively affecting the Te Kawerau ā Maki community living along the river. Between 1919 and 1925, kauri logging intensified when the Kauri Timber Company (KTC) operated along the Waitākere River valley. During this period, the company operated a bush tramline along the valley. In 1927, the height of the Waitakere Dam was increased, which increased the size of the Waitakere Reservoir and flooded the original site of Waitī.

== Gallery ==
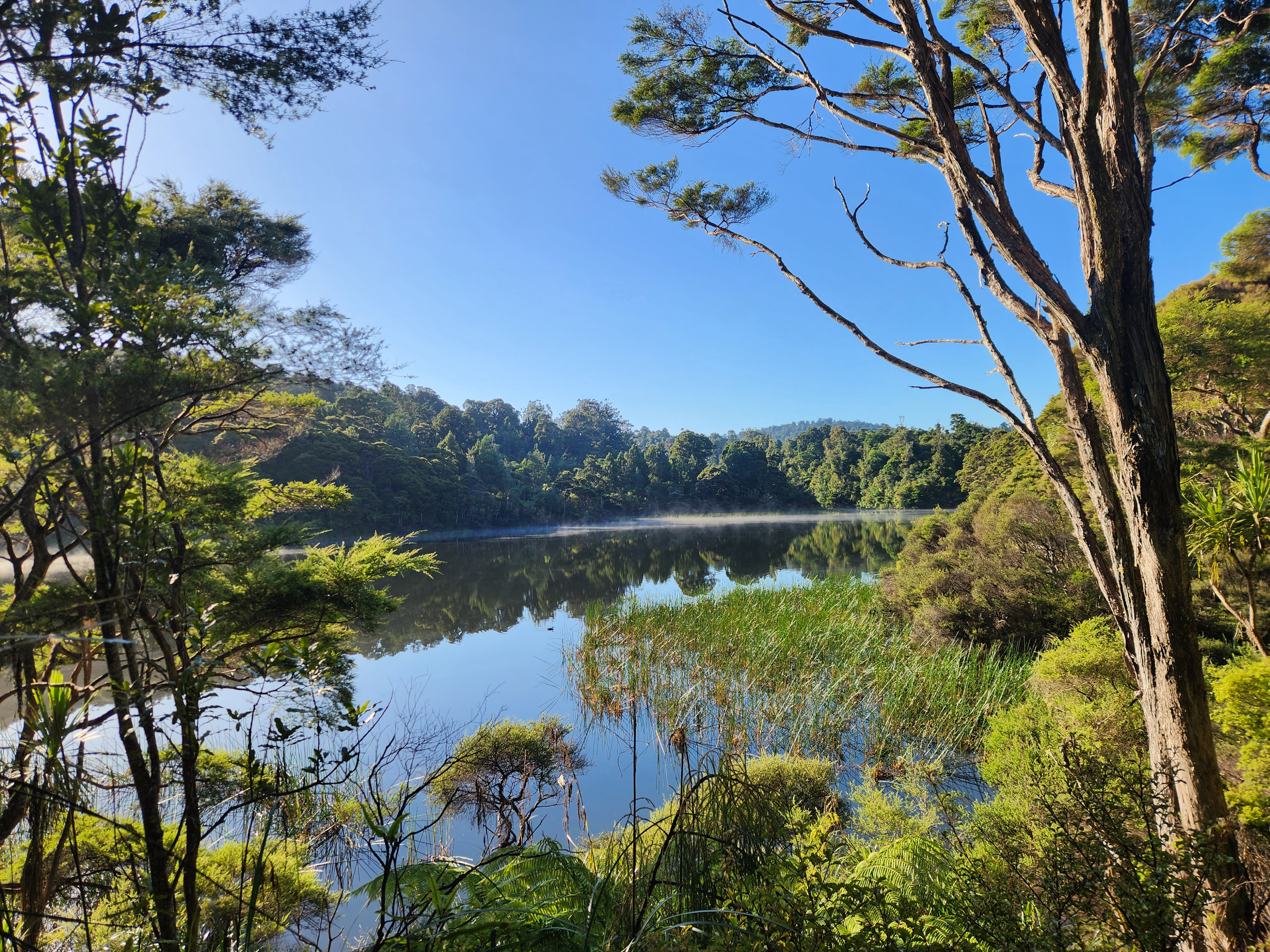
The Waitākere Reservoir

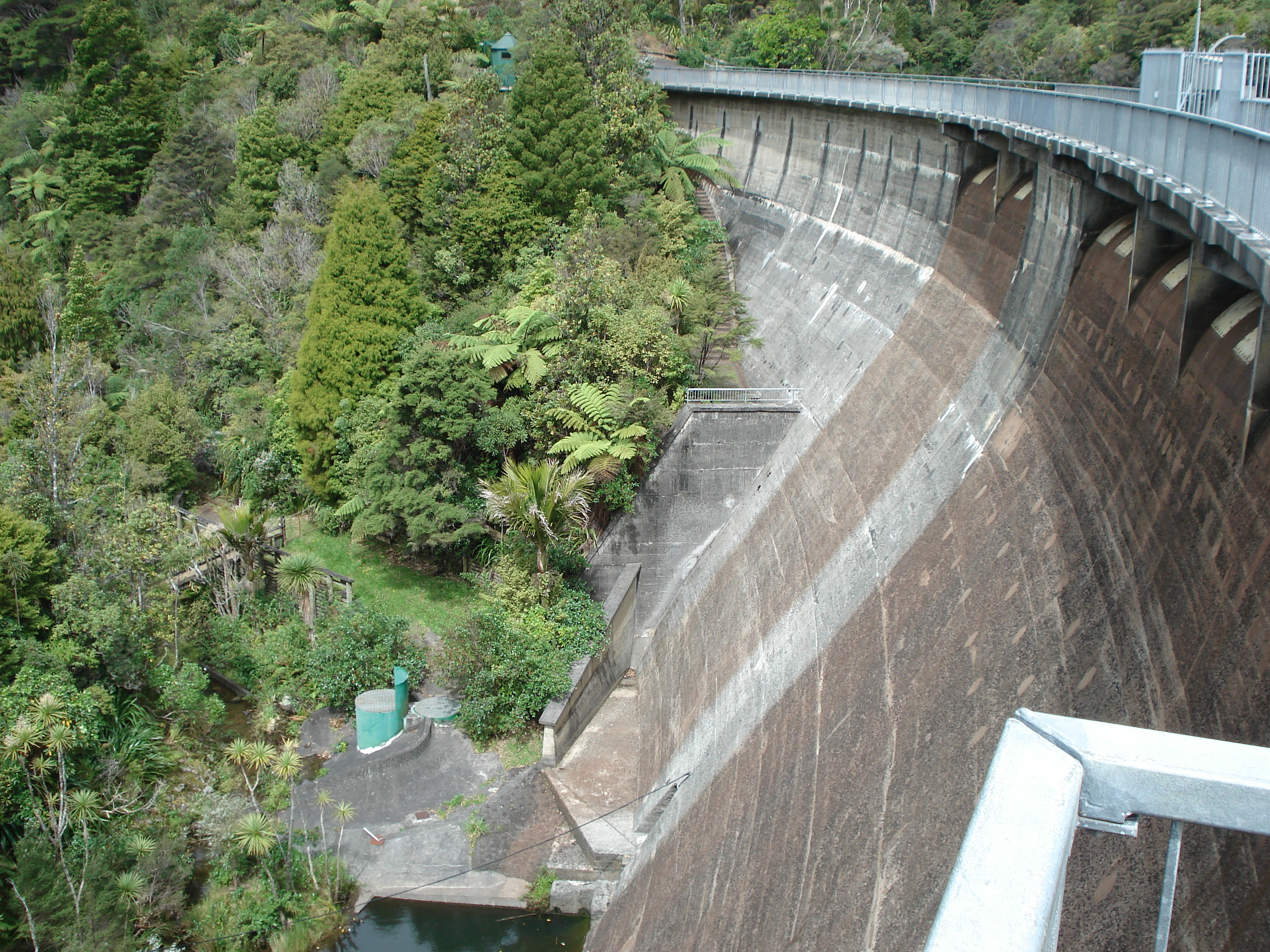
The Waitākere Dam

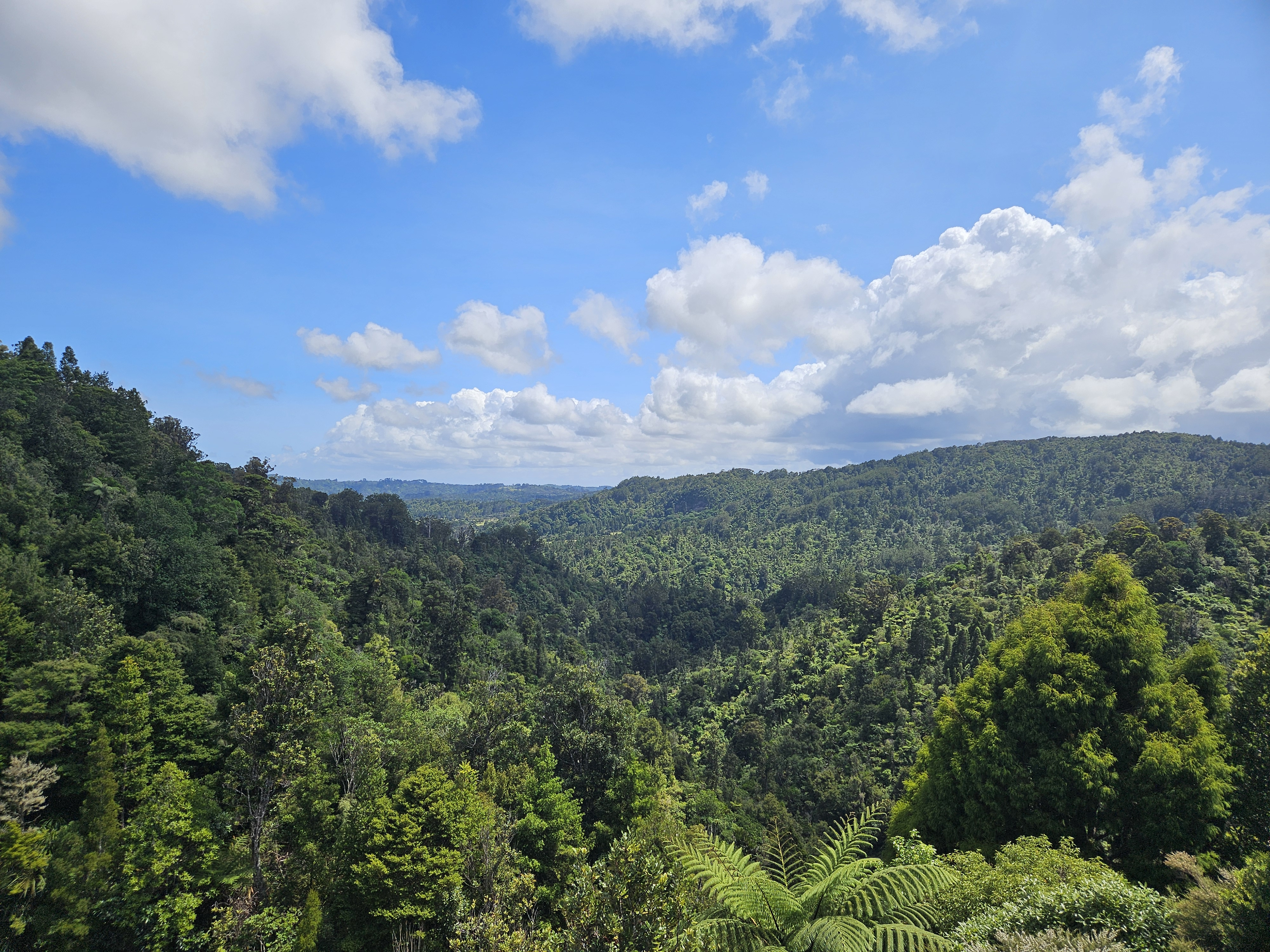
The upper Waitākere River valley northwest of the Waitākere Reservoir

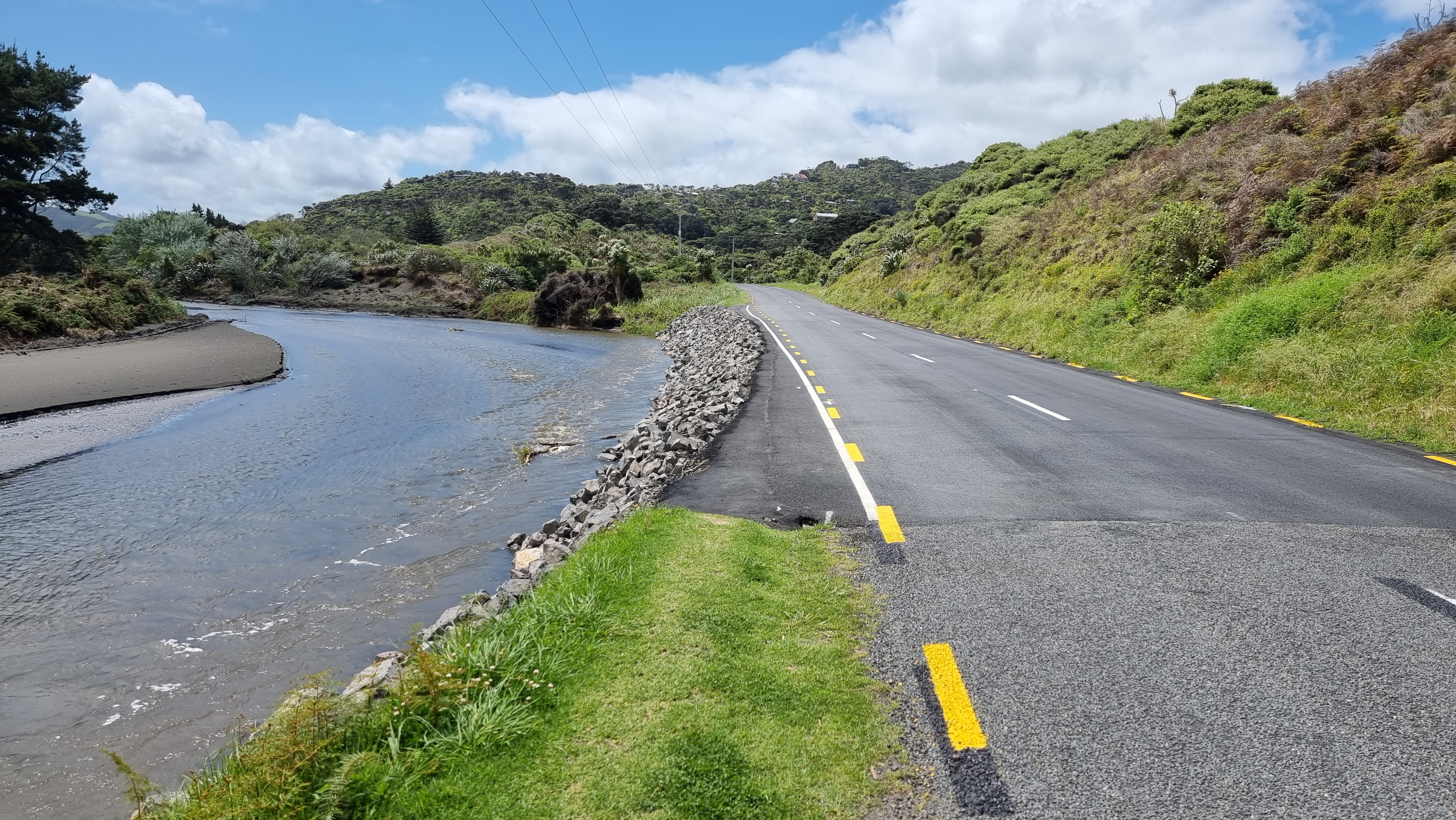
The Waitākere River near Te Henga (Bethells Beach)

== See also ==
- List of rivers of New Zealand
- Te Henga (Bethells Beach)#Ecology of the Waitakere River catchment
