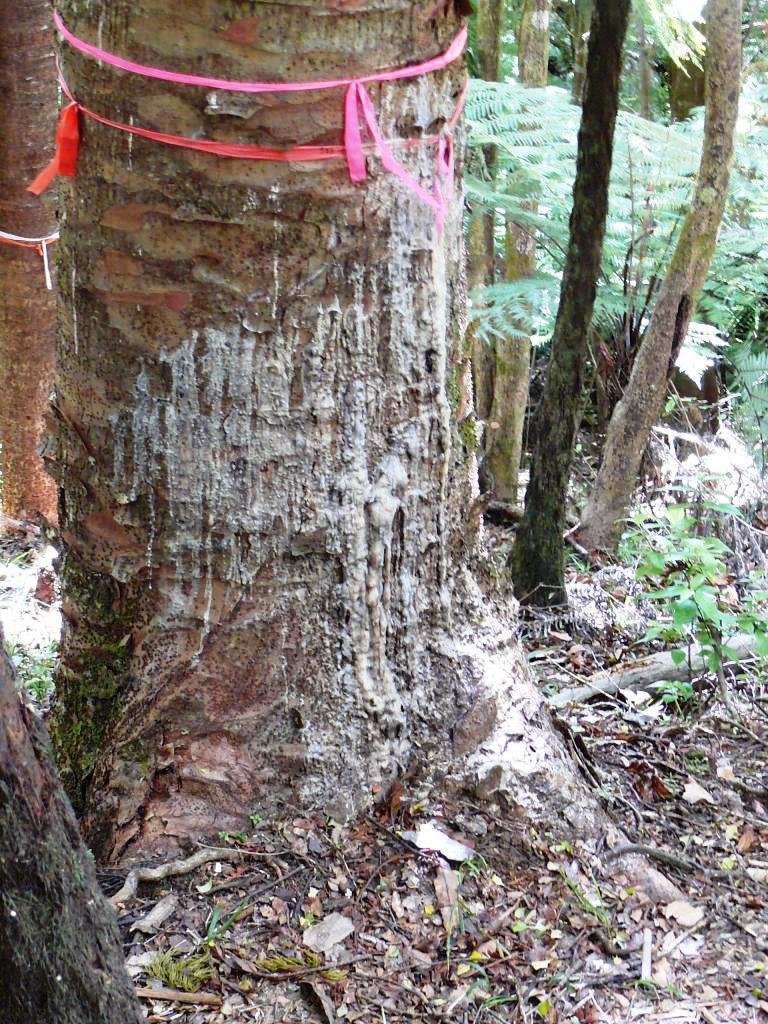
- A kauri tree with a bleeding trunk lesion

Scientific classification
- Domain: Eukaryota
- Supergroup: Stramenopiles
- Division: Oomycota
- Class: Peronosporomycetes
- Order: Peronosporales
- Family: Peronosporaceae
- Genus: Phytophthora
- Species: P. agathidicida

Binomial name
- Phytophthora agathidicida B.S. Weir, Beever, Pennycook & Bellgard

Synonyms
- Phytophthora 'taxon Agathis'

= Kauri dieback =

Species of oomycete

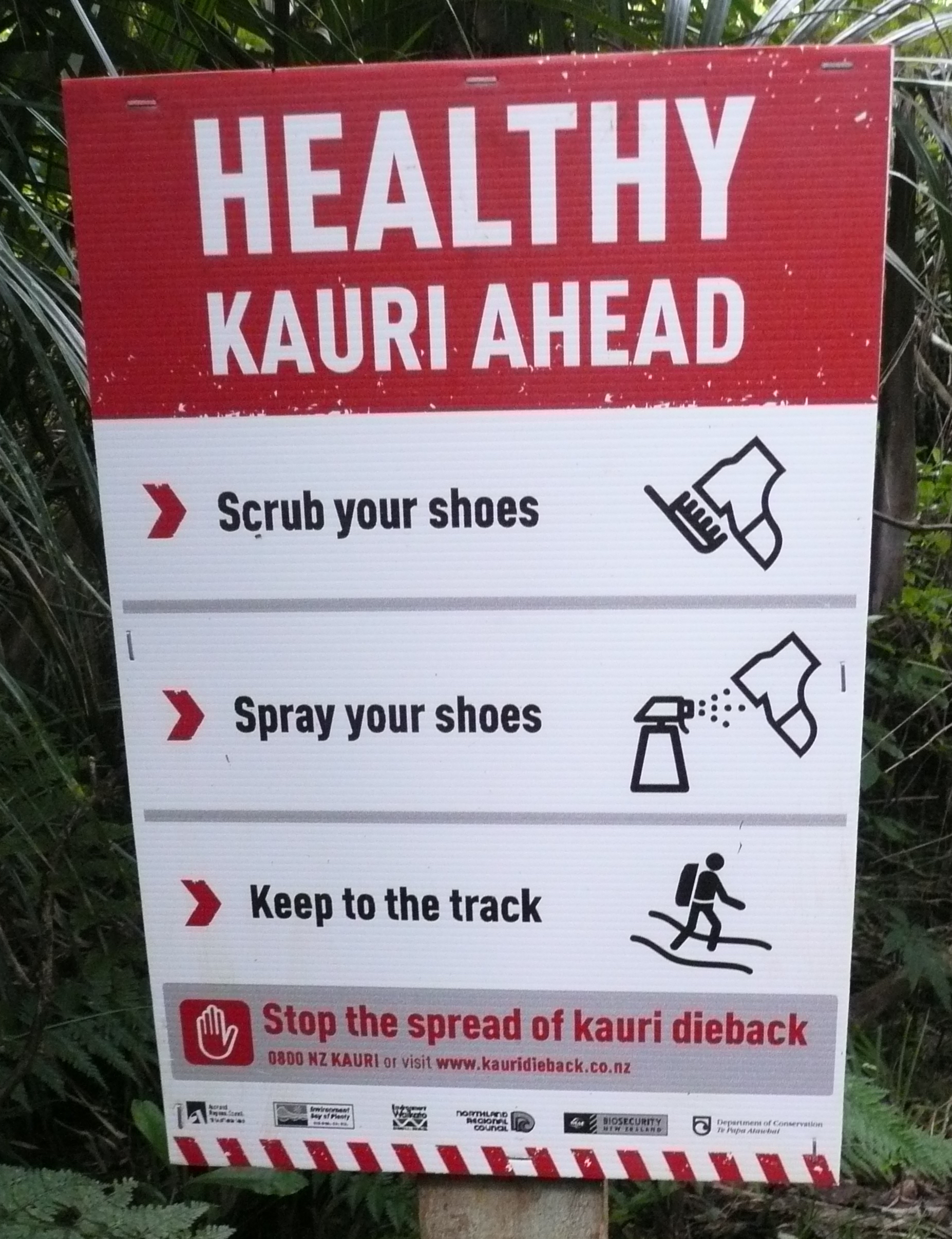
A warning sign in the Waitākere Ranges

Kauri dieback is a forest dieback disease of the native kauri trees (Agathis australis) of New Zealand that is suspected to be caused by the oomycete Phytophthora agathidicida. Symptoms can include root rot and associated rot in a collar around the base of the tree, bleeding resin, yellowing and chlorosis of the leaves followed by extensive defoliation, and finally, death.

== Etymology ==
Phytophthora (from Greek φυτόν (phytón), "plant" and φθορά (phthorá), "destruction"; "the plant-destroyer") is a genus of plant-damaging oomycetes (water moulds), whose member species are capable of causing enormous economic losses on crops worldwide, as well as environmental damage in natural ecosystems.

The species name agathidicida means "kauri killer", from the genitive noun agathid- (meaning "of the kauri genus Agathis") and the Latin suffix -cide (from the verb cadere, to kill).

== Disease ==
Symptoms of kauri dieback include root rot of both fine-feeder and larger structural roots; a collar rot lesion causing resin production ("gummosis") at the collar and lower trunk region; severe chlorosis and defoliation of the canopy; and overall crown decline. Infection by kauri dieback can rapidly kill seedlings and trees of all ages. Trees of all size classes are killed in natural forest remnants, amenity garden and park trees, and kauri plantations.

== Identification ==
Phytophthora agathidicida was first discovered on Great Barrier Island in 1972 by Peter Gadgil, and was initially identified from slides as a different organism, P. heveae. Phytophthora in mainland New Zealand kauri trees was also identified causing dieback in the Waitākere Ranges linked to Phytophthora cinnamomi.

In March 2006, entomologist Peter Maddison noticed a distinctly different infection in mature kauri in the Waitākere Ranges. Plant pathologists Ross Beever and Nick Waipara recognised this as a distinct Phytophthora species and it was named Phytophthora 'taxon Agathis' (abbreviated PTA). It was formally named Phytophthora agathidicida in 2015.

Phytophthora agathidicida is a species in the group of Phytophthora called ‘Clade 5’ which is defined by ITS DNA sequences. Within Clade 5 P. agathidicida can be distinguished from the other species by DNA sequence differences and oospores that have a moderately bumpy surface. In pure agar culture the optimum growth temperature is 21.5 °C.

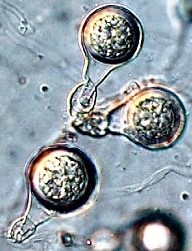
P. agathidicida oospores

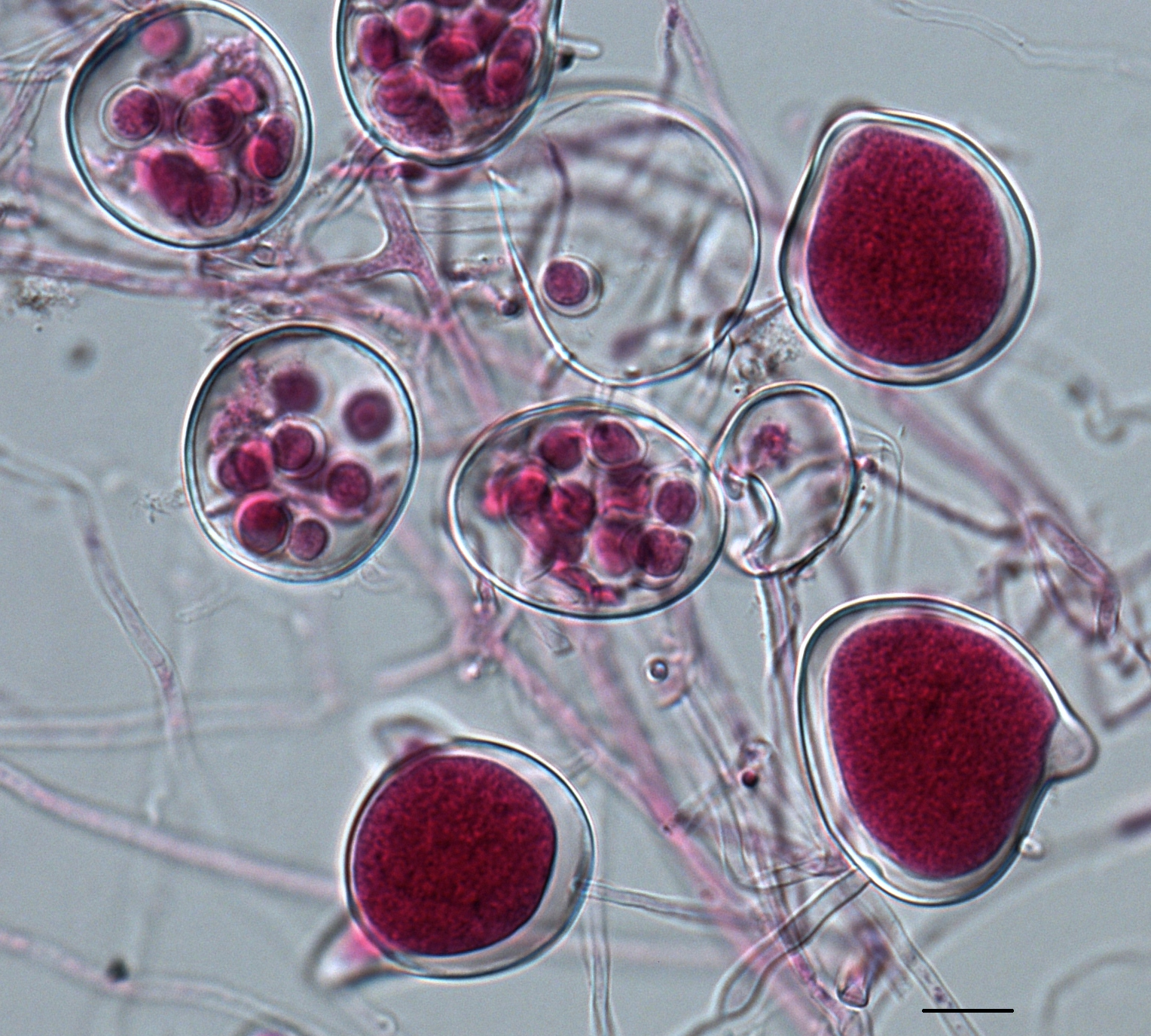
P. agathidicida sporangia and germinating zoospores

== History of spread ==
It is not known when the microorganism arrived in New Zealand nor the source, but the centre of diversity of Phytophthora Clade 5 is believed to be in the East Asia / Pacific region. A media report of an unpublished study based on mitochondrial genomes of 17 isolates suggested that it may have existed in New Zealand for centuries and has only recently become a danger to kauri. However, the 100% mortality rate and speed with which the disease has spread since 2016 suggests that it is a more recent arrival.

Another study linked infected forests with plantings from the Sweetwater Nursery in Waipoua Forest by the New Zealand Forest Service in the 1950s. The only forest that has been regularly monitored for kauri dieback using a scientifically peer-reviewed methodology is the Waitākere Ranges. Between 2011 and 2016, the recorded distribution of kauri dieback relative to kauri area rose from 8% to 19%. In 2021 it was reported that the baseline prevalence of symptomatic kauri trees was 16.5%. Of these symptomatic trees, 23% showed P. agathidicida in their soil samples. In the Waitākeres 58% of large areas of kauri ecosystem over 5 hectares have some state of infection. An independent review of the epidemiology of the Kauri study found that "the Auckland data is of limited use if we want to conduct an analysis to identify factors associated with PTA being present".

Current pathogen distribution knowledge is based on soil sampling, ground-truthing, and aerial surveillance, but that has usually been limited to stands of kauri showing symptoms, at a coarse scale. Aerial surveillance has not used multi- or hyperspectral imagery or change detection. It is unclear to what extent the disease spread is caused by distribution of the pathogen or whether unknown factors such as kauri resistance or how P. agathidicida living on alternative hosts has influenced the spread of the disease.

Date	Event
March 1972	First isolated from Great Barrier Island
1974	Publication describing this isolation, initially identified as P. heveae
March 2006	First found in the Waitākere Ranges
June 2006	First documented as a possible new species with the tag name "Phytophthora taxon Agathis"
2008	Declared as an "unwanted organism" under the Biosecurity Act 1993
2015	Formal publication of the name "Phytophthora agathidicida"
2 December 2017	Te Kawerau ā Maki place rāhui over Waitākere Ranges forest
5 December 2017	Auckland Council decided not to close Waitākere Ranges
15 February 2018	NZ Parliament Environment Select Committee calls for briefing on kauri dieback
20 February 2018	Auckland Council votes to close entire Waitākere Ranges forests
18 March 2018	DOC closed Goldie Bush, temporarily reopened later that year. As of 2022 the reserve remains closed.
1 May 2018	MPI issues "Controlled Area Notices" for the Waitākere Ranges and parts of the Hunua Ranges
12 May 2018	Rahui closes Okura Bush Scenic Reserve
June 2018	Conservation status of kauri announced as "threatened species"
25 June 2018	Government announces an independent panel to review kauri dieback
July 2018	Found in North Shore reserves
August 2018	Closure of all Forest and Bird reserves that have kauri

== Transmission ==
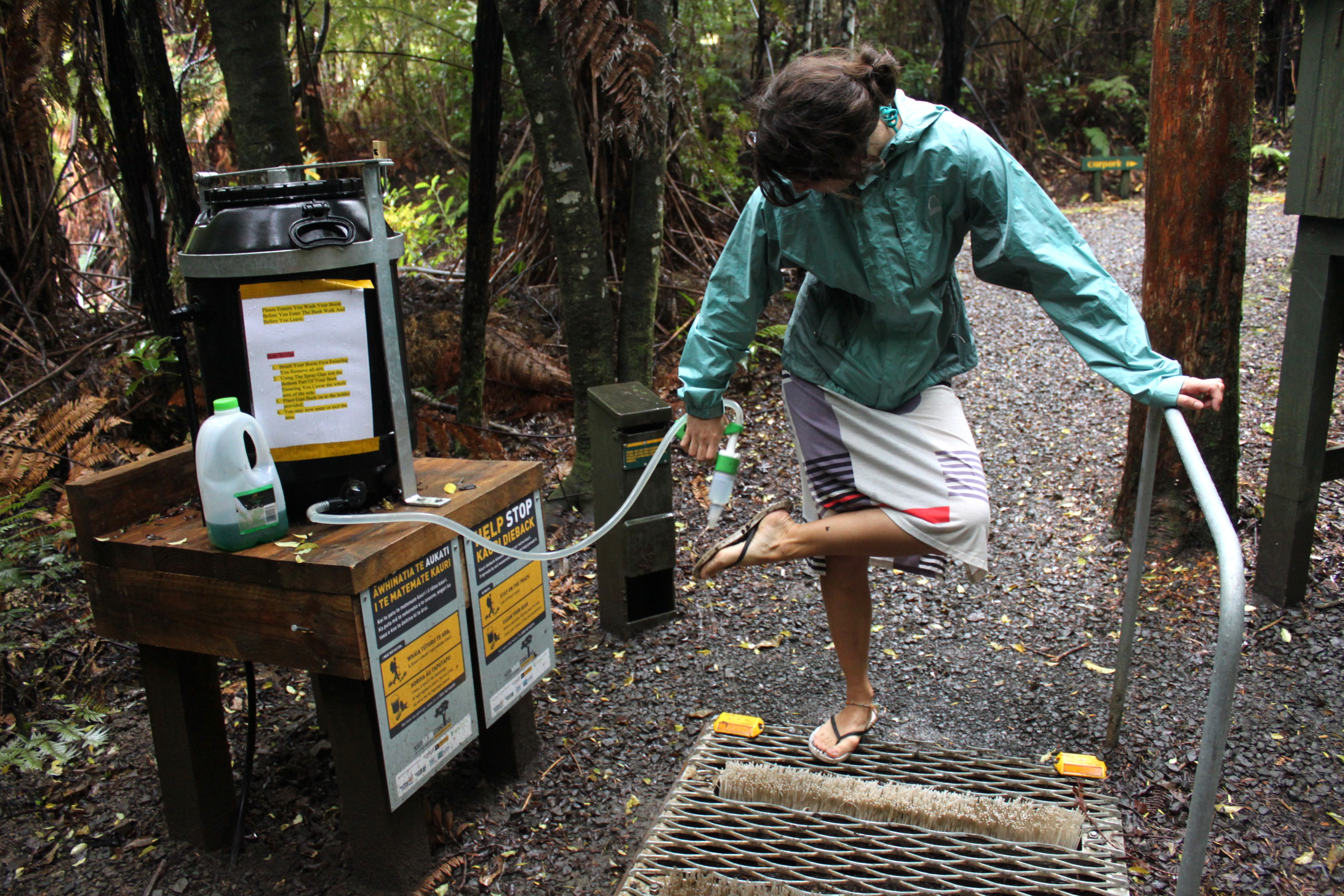
Footwashing station at Trounson Kauri Park, to stop the spread of kauri dieback

The disease is solely soil-borne and mostly spread in infected soil carried from tree to tree. P. agathidicida spores can be carried in soil the size of a pinhead. The consensus among experts is that the predominant vector for spread of the disease is human activity.

Phytophthora zoospores require water to germinate from the oospore, and can migrate by themselves through waterlogged soil. P. cinnamomi zoospores remain mobile for up to 10 hours, and can swim at speeds of up to 58 centimetres per hour. However, their direction of travel frequently changes, so they disperse no more than 6 cm by swimming. Consequently, long-distance dispersal of Phytophthora depends on other forms of transport.

Feral pigs have been blamed for the spread of kauri dieback due to their tendency to gnaw on the roots of kauri trees, and to transport infected soil on their snouts and trotters. Researchers were able to show P. agathidicida could sometimes survive passage through a pig's gut in a controlled feeding experiment, but they did not detect P. agathidicida in the stomachs of 184 wild-caught pigs that did contain five other Phytophthora species. There is no direct evidence that feral pigs act as a vector for kauri dieback.

While only kauri trees develop the characteristic dieback disease following infection, it appears that seven other native New Zealand forest plants can act as hosts for the pathogen without showing symptoms themselves. These include Dracophyllum, tanekaha (Phyllocladus trichomanoides), tall mingimingi (Leucopogon fasciculatus), rewarewa (Knightia excelsa) and Astelia trinervia. It is thought that the community of symbiotic mycorrhizal fungi living on the roots of healthy kauri trees may help protect them from Phytophthora infection.

== Disease management ==
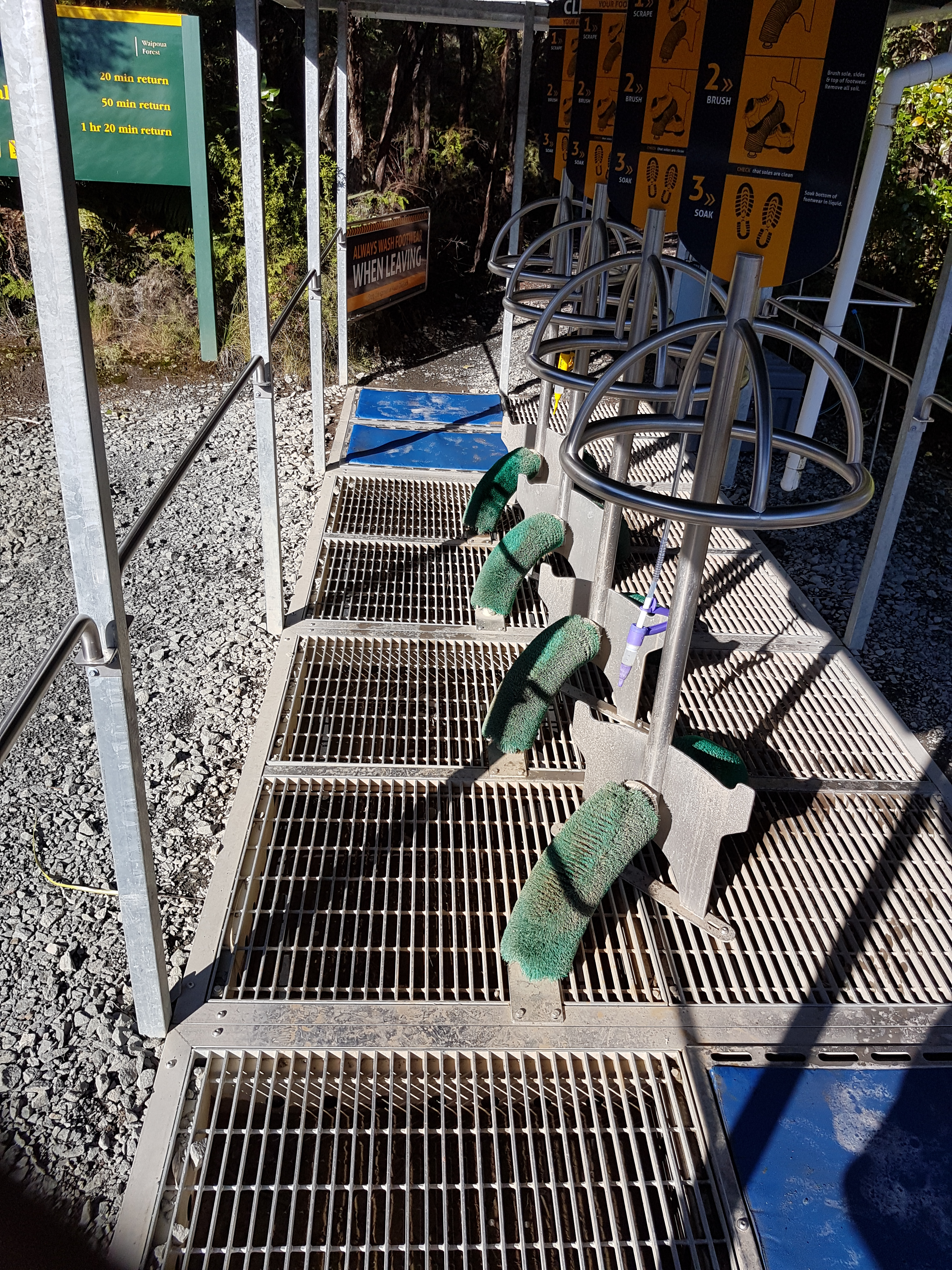
Kauri dieback footwear cleaning station, Waipoua Forest

Auckland Regional Council (ARC) began disease surveys and information workshops in October 2006. A Joint Agency was formed in November 2008 comprising the ARC, Northland Regional Council (NRC), the Department of Conservation (DOC) and Ministry of Agriculture and Fisheries Biosecurity New Zealand (MAFBNZ), to develop joint communications and share information.

This was replaced in November 2009 by the National Kauri Dieback Management Programme, sponsored and funded by MAFBNZ, DOC, ARC, NRC, Environment Waikato (EW), Environment Bay of Plenty (EBoP), and tangata whenua. This began a five-year national programme of research and science oversight, surveillance, education and outreach. In 2014 this was renewed for a further 10 years.

=== Footwear cleaning stations ===
To prevent the spread of the disease, footwear-washing stations have been set up at the entrances and exits of walking tracks. These cleaning stations provide Trigene detergent spray (also known as Sterigene) and scrubbing brushes or grates. However, the effectiveness and compliance is poor. A 2016 report estimated that 83% of track users were failing to clean their footwear at the cleaning stations provided.

DOC has since conducted research to improve the design of these cleaning stations to find out whether other designs are more likely to be used. Some improved designs were trialled during the Hilary running event in the Waitakeres and have been installed in the Waipoua forest.

=== Closing of forests ===
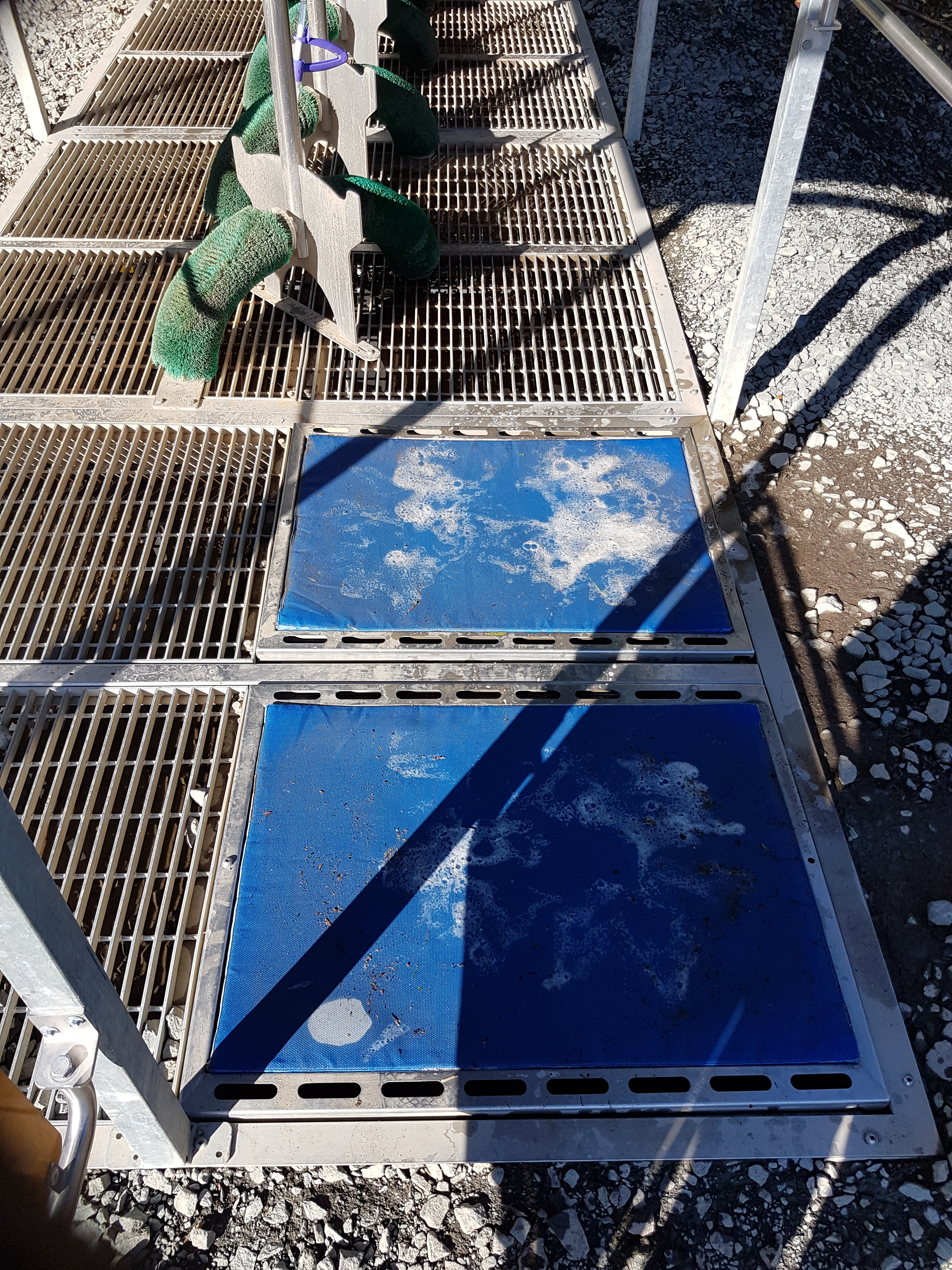
Kauri dieback footwear cleaning station, Waipoua Forest

On 2 December 2017 the local iwi Te Kawerau ā Maki placed an unofficial rāhui (traditional prohibition) over the kauri forest that covers large areas of the Waitākere Ranges to try to slow kauri dieback's spread, but initially at least the rāhui was frequently breached by the general public. The Waitākere Ranges were consequently the only large area of forest close to West Auckland that was still open to the public. On 20 February 2018, Auckland Council announced that all forested areas of the Waitākere Ranges would be closed to the public, as the rāhui had not been effective. At-risk parts of the Hunua Ranges to the south-east of Auckland were also to be closed as a preventive measure, even though kauri dieback had not yet been recorded there.

=== Treatment ===
A number of compounds have been identified which are active in vitro against the pathogen responsible for kauri dieback, including common broad-spectrum antifungal agents such as copper sulfate. However, there is as yet no established treatment for infected trees, with the large size of mature kauri trees and the remote location of many infected areas making any treatment challenging. Trials are underway using injections of phosphite into infected kauri trees, as this is an established treatment against Phytophthora cinnamomi in fruit trees such as avocados. Dr Ian Horner at Plant & Food Research began studying the effectiveness of phosphite in 2010. Phosphite injected directly into the trunk of affected trees has been shown to stop the progress of the disease, halting sap bleeding, enabling new bark to grow and prolonging the tree's life. This treatment is effective on trees of a consistent size, but research continues on effective dosages for trees of different sizes. Phosphite treatment can be effective against individual kauri trees, but will not kill the Phytophthora pathogen in the soil, potentially allowing it to continue to spread to healthy trees nearby.

In 2024, research explored the potential of cell-wall-degrading enzymes or enzyme-producing microorganisms as biological control agents to inhibit Phytophthora agathidicida. This experimental approach aims to supplement existing treatments such as phosphite, though it remains at an early, experimental stage.

== See also ==
- Dutch elm disease
- Phytophthora infestans – potato blight
