= Te Kawerau ā Maki =

Māori iwi (tribe) in New Zealand

- Iwi (tribe) in Māoridom
- Rohe (region): Mostly within Auckland Region
- Waka (canoe): Tainui, Aotea, Tokomaru, Kahuitara, Kurahaupō
- Population: 251 registered adults (June 2017)
- Website: www.tekawerau.iwi.nz

Te Kawerau ā Maki, Te Kawerau a Maki, or Te Kawerau-a-Maki is a Māori iwi (tribe) of the Auckland Region of New Zealand. Predominantly based in West Auckland (Hikurangi also known as Waitākere), it had 251 registered adult members as of June 2017. The iwi holds land for a new marae and papakāinga at Te Henga (Bethells Beach) that was returned in 2018; and land for a secondary marae at Te Onekiritea (Hobsonville Point) that was returned in 2015. It has no wharenui (meeting house) yet.

== History ==
Te Kawerau ā Maki are the descendants of the rangatira (chief) Maki and his wife Rotu, who migrated with their family and followers from Kawhia to Tāmaki Makaurau (Auckland) in the early 1600s. Te Kawerau trace their ancestry from a number of Māori migration canoes, particularly the Tainui, but also Aotea, Tokomaru, Moekakara, Kahuitara and Kurahaupō. Tainui ancestors including Hoturoa and the tohunga Rakataura (Hape) are particularly important in Te Kawerau whakapapa, as is the ancient turehu ancestor and tohunga Tiriwa. Maki and his people were related to a number of groups who had occupied the Auckland region since the fourteenth century, including the Tainui hapū (sub-tribes) collectively known as Ngā Oho. Maki was particularly connected with the Ngāiwi group, who lived across the Auckland isthmus and to the south from Māngere Mountain to Manurewa. Maki initially took up residence among his kin at Manurewa (Te Manurewa o Tamapahore) and Rarotonga / Mount Smart.

Maki then lived for a while near Waimauku at the invitation of a chief of the district. While there Maki was insulted in an incident called Te Kawe Rau a Maki, meaning "the carrying strap of Maki". In response he and his warriors fought several battles against the local hapū, defeating them and taking control of a large part of the south Kaipara. Maki and Rotu had a son in the southwest Kaipara who was named Tawhiakiterangi, and also known as Te Kawerau ā Maki, after whom the tribe is named. Tawhiakiterangi would later marry Marukiterangi, daughter of Kahu, and granddaughter of Maeaeariki an older son of Maki. She was born near Te Oneroa o Kahu (Long Bay). Her people were the Te Kawerau hapū Ngāti Kahu of whom the North Shore gets its name - Te Whenua Roa o Kahu ("the extensive lands of Kahu").

Their rohe or area of customary shared interest grew to include the southern Kaipara, Mahurangi, North Shore, Auckland Isthmus, and Hauraki Gulf islands such as Tiritiri Matangi. By the end of the 1600s Te Kawerau ā Maki were particularly associated with West Auckland (known traditionally as Hikurangi), south-western Kaipara and the Upper Waitematā Harbour. In the early 1700s the paramount chief of Te Kawerau ā Maki was Te Au o Te Whenua ("the current of the land") who was a great provider for his people and was gifted his name following a process of peacemaking with the neighbouring Te Taou. His wife was Rangihina of the Te Kawerau hapū Ngāti Poataniwha who held the lands of the Upper Waitematā Harbour. The Waitākere Ranges and the forest that once covered much of Hikurangi are known by the traditional name Te Wao nui ā Tiriwa – the great forest of Tiriwa. The northernmost peaks of the Waitākere Ranges east of Muriwai around Taupaki became known as Ngā Rau Pou a Maki, or the many posts of Maki, which also came to be the collective name for the Waitākere Ranges as a whole.

Europeans arriving in the late 1700s and early 1800s brought epidemic diseases that weakened Te Kawerau ā Maki and other tribes that were living in the same area by then. From 1821 the Musket Wars reached Auckland through raids by the Ngāpuhi tribe, led by Hongi Hika. In 1825 Te Kawerau ā Maki suffered major losses at the hands of Ngāpuhi and they and other Auckland tribes went effectively into exile in the Waikato. Te Kawerau ā Maki remained there until 1835, when they returned to the Waitākere area, and later the south Kaipara, under the protection of the Waikato chief Te Wherowhero.

Early but rapid colonial land speculation from the 1830s onwards resulted in Te Kawerau ā Maki losing more than 90% of its customary land title by 1853 - within 13 years of the signing of Te Tiriti o Waitangi. Native reserves remained in a few isolated places - Piha, Waitākere (Te Henga), Kōprionui (southern Woodhill), Muriwai, Paremoremo, and around Mahurangi - however the last of these were forcibly taken by 1953 under the Public Works Act leaving the tribe effectively landless. While Te Kawerau ā Maki people continue to live in the wider area, the last formal marae at Waiti (Bethells Beach) was abandoned around 1920 following the construction of the Waitākere Dam that altered the hydrology of the Waitākere River combined with ongoing issues relating to the economic and social disenfranchisement of Māori.

== Recent events ==
In February 2014 a Deed of Settlement was signed between Te Kawerau ā Maki and the Crown following years of negotiations led by Hariata Ewe and Te Warena Taua. In September 2015 the Te Kawerau ā Maki Claims Settlement Act was passed into legislation. This Deed and its corresponding Act records the acknowledgements and apology given by the Crown to Te Kawerau ā Maki and gives effect to provisions of the deed of settlement that settles the historical Treaty of Waitangi claims of Te Kawerau ā Maki. The Settlement included the return of 3275 ha of Riverhead Forest.

In late 2017 Te Kawerau ā Maki issued a rāhui (customary prohibition) on people entering the forested area of the Waitākere Ranges, in order to help slow the spread of kauri dieback disease, support the mauri (life essence) of the forest, and buy time for research and improved recreational infrastructure and management to be implemented.

Te Kawerau ā Maki were the official host iwi in 2018 for Auckland Council's annual Matariki Festival. As part of this, amongst other activities, they organised the festival's official dawn ceremony launch at the Arataki Visitor Centre, a sound and light display on the Auckland Harbour Bridge, and an exhibition of their history at Te Uru Waitakere Contemporary Gallery.

In 2022, Te Kawerau Iwi Tiaki Trust was awarded $75,000 from the Auckland Council Cultural Initiative Fund "for a feasibility report, concept design and planning to develop a marae and papakainga in Te Henga".

== See also ==
- List of Māori iwi
- Ōtuataua and Ihumātao
