= Nihotupu =

Nihotupu may refer to:

- Nihotupu Tramline
- Lower Nihotupu Reservoir
- Upper Nihotupu Reservoir
