= Big Muddy Creek (New Zealand) =

River in the Auckland Region, New Zealand

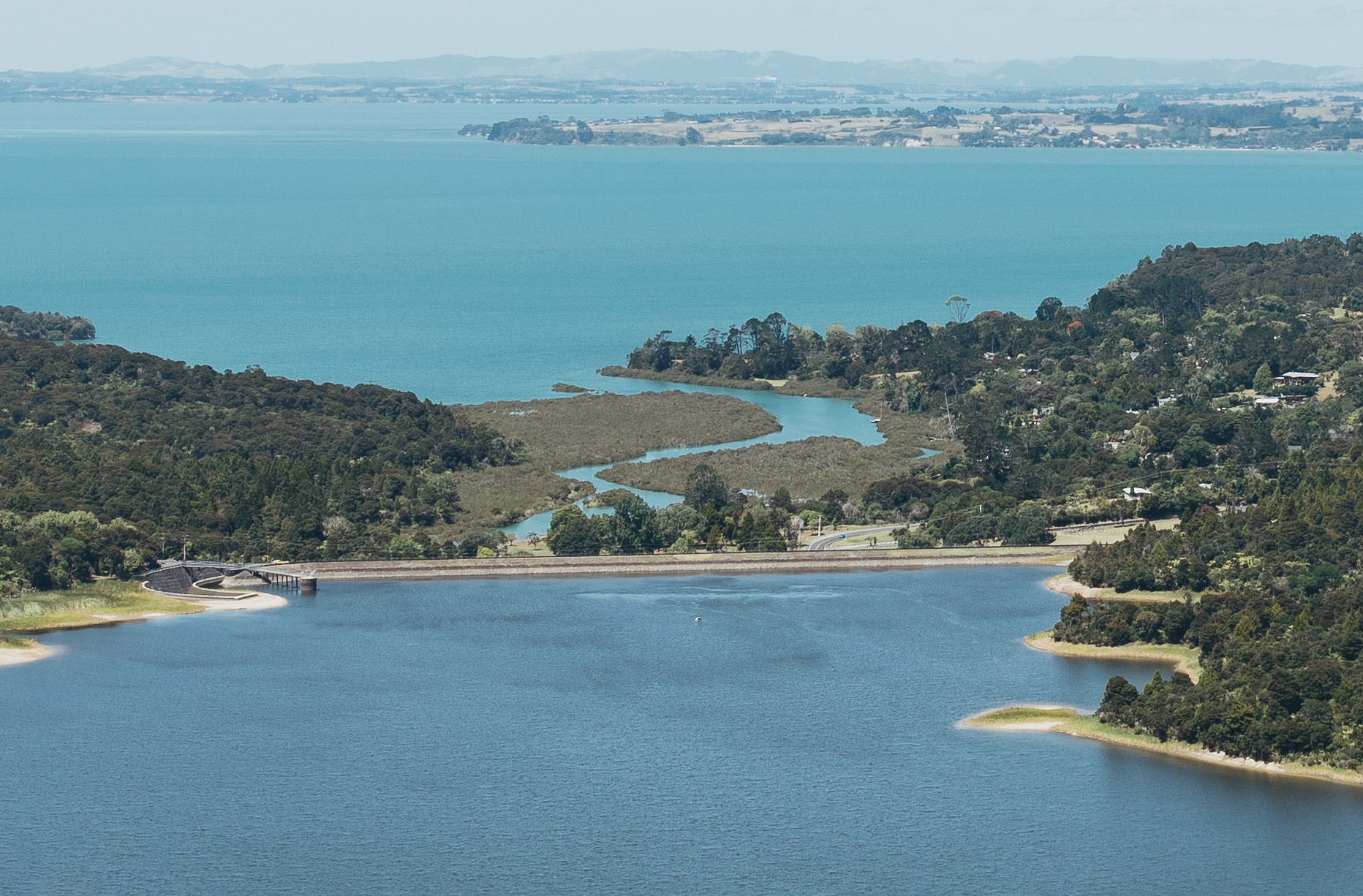
- Big Muddy Creek seen from the Arataki Visitor Centre

- Mouth of the Big Muddy Creek Big Muddy Creek (New Zealand) (New Zealand)
- Route of the Big Muddy Creek

Location
- Country: New Zealand
- Region: Auckland Region

Physical characteristics
- Source: Lower Nihotupu Reservoir
  - coordinates: 36.96209°S 174.61595°E
  - elevation: 65 m
- Mouth: Manukau Harbour
  - coordinates: 36.9762°S 174.6247°E

Basin features
- Progression: Big Muddy Creek → Manukau Harbour → Tasman Sea
- Tributaries
  - left: Williams Stream, Finn Creek
  - right: Shelly Lynn, Armour Stream

The Big Muddy Creek is an estuarine tidal inlet of the Auckland Region of New Zealand's North Island. It flows south from its tributary rivers, the Nihotupu Stream and the Island stream in the Waitākere Ranges which are dammed at the Lower Nihotupu Reservoir, towards the Manukau Harbour.

== Geology ==
Between 3 and 5 million years ago, tectonic forces between the Pacific Plate and Australian Plate uplifted the Waitākere Ranges and subsided the Manukau Harbour. Big Muddy Creek is likely a part of a fault-line that formed during this event. After the Last Glacial Maximum when sea levels rose, the river mouths of West Auckland flooded. While beaches formed at the mouths of Tasman Sea rivers, the relative lack of sand in the Manukau Harbour meant that Huia, Big Muddy Creek and Little Muddy Creek became tidal mudflats.

== History ==
The creek was traditionally called Paruroa by Tāmaki Māori, meaning "wide mud", sharing meaning with the English language name. The creek was important to Te Kawerau ā Maki, the mana whenua of the area, as a place where pātiki (flounder) could be netted. Two Te Kawerau ā Maki kāinga (unfortified villages) existed in the area: Nihotupu, at Armour Bay close to the modern village of Parau, and Ngāmoko, near the Lower Nihotupu Dam.

The creek was the site of the battle of Te-Rangi-hinganga-tahi, fought circa 1741 between the Te Taoū hapū of Ngāti Whātua, and Waiohua, then the major power on the Tāmaki isthmus. After paramount chief Kiwi Tāmaki murdered guests at a funeral feast in Kaipara (modern-day Helensville), Te Taoū took revenge by attacking Waiohua-allied settlements on the Manukau Harbour. The Te Taoū taua (war party) of 240 men, led by the chiefs Tuperiri, Wahaakiaki and Waitaheke, regrouped at Big Muddy Creek. Kiwi Tāmaki, enraged at the attacks, formed a taua of thousands formed from across Tāmaki Makaurau, and descended on Big Muddy Creek. Wahaakiaki ordered his warriors to adopt a feigned retreat, forcing the Waiohua force up the creek. Despite being vastly outnumbered, Kiwi Tāmaki was defeated in battle and many of the demoralised Waiohua force died as they fled the battle. The name of the battle, Te-Rangi-hinganga-tahi ("The Day When All Fell Together"), referred to the large number of corpses which polluted the Big Muddy Creek shellfish beds.

Te Kawerau ā Maki remained in the area until 1825, when the Musket Wars forced most members of the iwi to flee to other regions in the country. Many members of the tribe returned in 1836, first living at Huia to the west, before re-establishing a kāinga at Te Henga / Bethells Beach. The land at Big Muddy Creek was sold to Europeans in the early colonial era of New Zealand without the knowledge of Te Kawerau ā Maki leaders. From the 1830s until the 1920s, kauri trees were felled by European settlers for the logging industry in the southern Waitākere Ranges. The coastal community of Parau developed on the western shores of Big Muddy Creek in the late 19th and early 20th centuries. In the latter half of the 19th century, the creek was occasionally referred to as Mangrove Creek.

In the early 20th century, the creek was dammed with timber and later concrete structures. The Lower Nihotupu Dam was constructed in 1948.

== Gallery ==
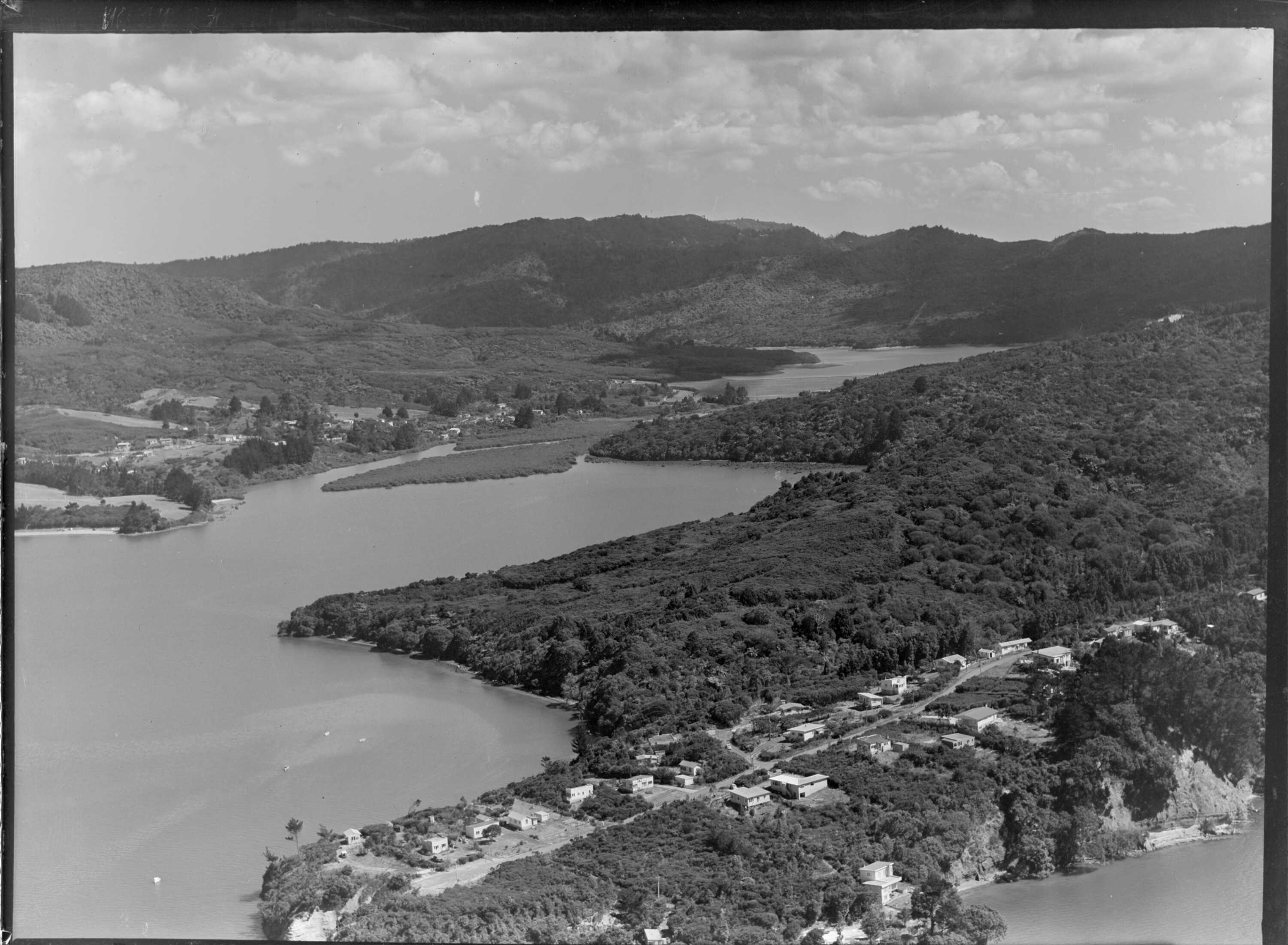
Big Muddy Creek in 1962

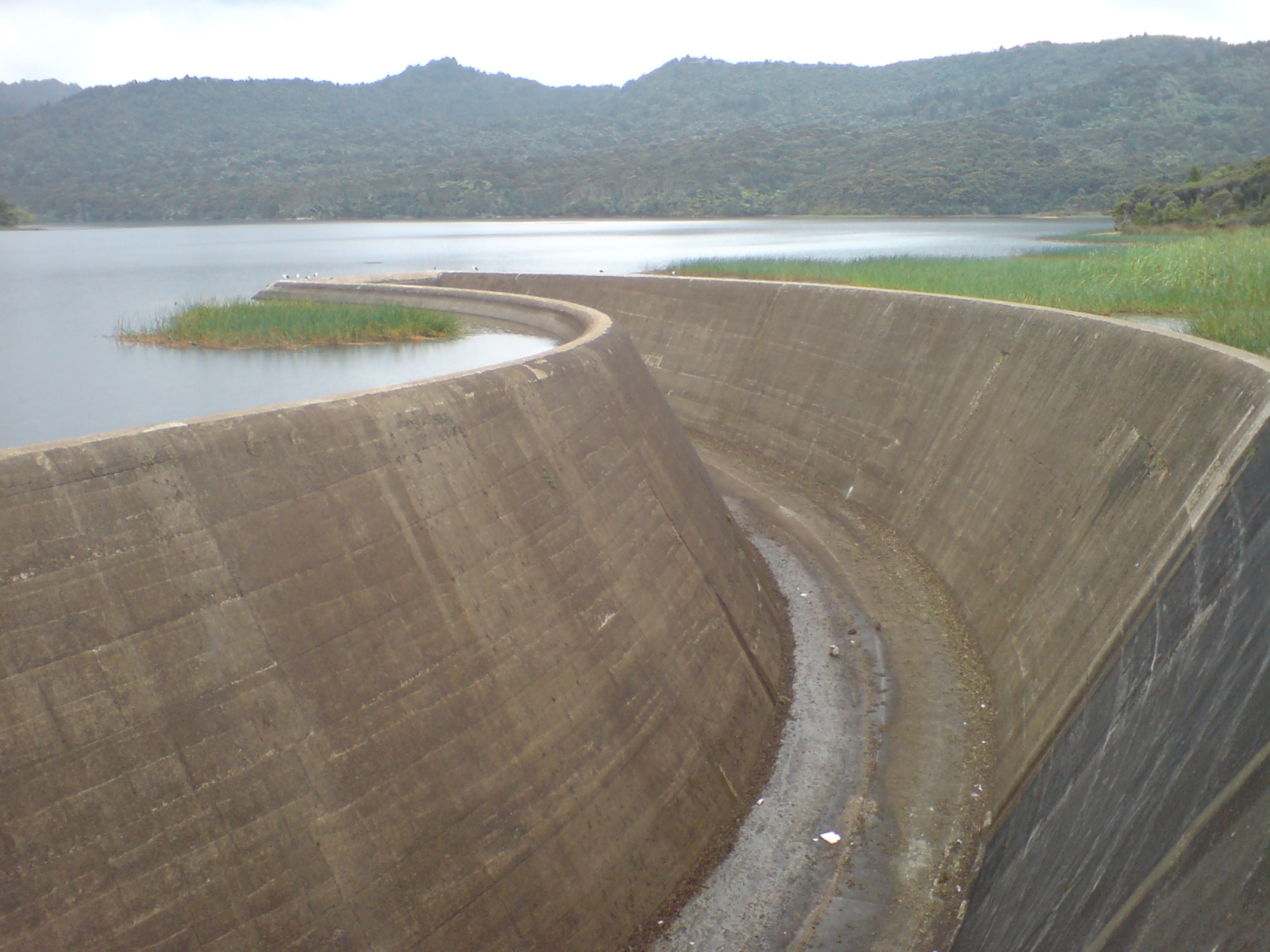
The Lower Nihotupu Dam Spillway

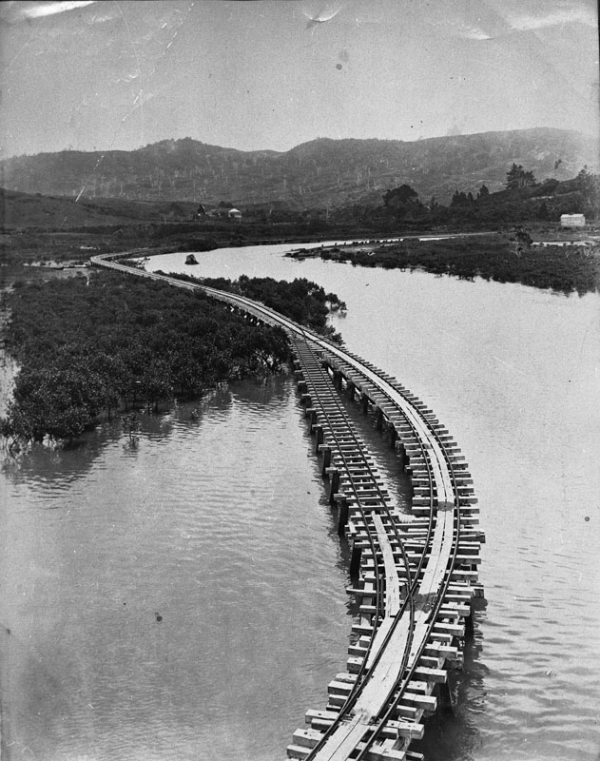
Nihotupu Dam tramway passing over Big Muddy Creek in 1920

== See also ==
- List of rivers of New Zealand
