= Parau =

Coastal settlement in West Auckland, New Zealand

- Suburb
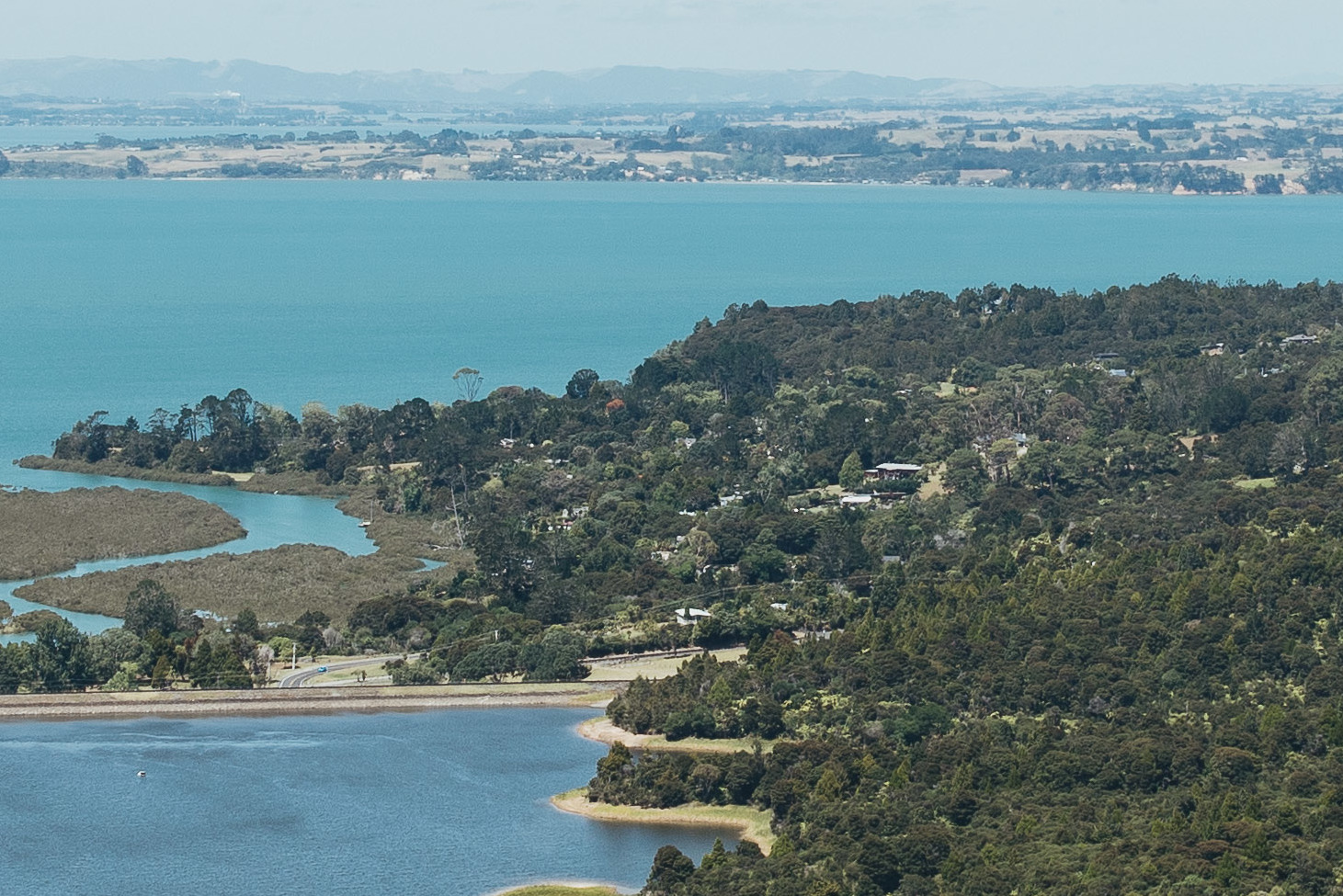
- Parau seen from the Arataki Visitor Centre
- Interactive map of Parau
- Coordinates: 36.9739°S 174.6145°E
- Country: New Zealand
- City: Auckland Council
- Electoral ward: Waitākere ward
- Local board: Waitākere Ranges Local Board

Area
  - Land: 148 ha (370 acres)

Population (June 2025)
  - Total: 500
  - Density: 340/km^{2} (870/sq mi)

(Waitākere Ranges)	(Waitākere Ranges)	Woodlands Park
(Waitākere Ranges)	Parau	Laingholm
Huia	Cornwallis	(Manukau Harbour)

Parau is a locality of West Auckland in the Auckland Region. It is under the local governance of Auckland Council. It is a coastal community close to Titirangi village. Parau is made up of Huia Road, one other looping street called Rauhuia Crescent and two cul de sacs, Staley Road and Shirley Road. It also consists of a safe clean beach called Armour Bay where locals can partake in tennis, and swimming in the Manukau Harbour which laps the beach.

== Geography ==
The Parau area is dominated by pōhutukawa/rata sheltered coastal fringe forest. Higher elevation areas of the peninsula and mainlands are predominantly a warm lowlands pūriri forest.

== History ==
Parau is close to the site of the 1740s battle between Te Taoū hapū of Ngāti Whātua and Kiwi Tāmaki of Waiohua (now underneath the Lower Nihotupu Reservoir).

During the mid-19th century, the area was deforested for kauri timber, and later formed by Duff and Marshall Laing, sons of George Laing who had settled at Laingholm. The western shores of Big Muddy Creek were farmed by the Armour family, while the eastern shores were owned by Jermyn Symonds. The farming settlement that developed around the area became known as Brooklyn by the late 19th century. In the early 20th century, Duff Laing continued to run a dairy farm in the area, and the Flemish-Belgian De Brabandere family ran a sheep and dairy farm owned by the Flemish-Belgian De Brabandere family.

The name of the post office was changed to Parau in the late 1910s. In the mid-1910s, construction began on Upper Nihotupu Dam, leading Parau to develop as an area where workers families settled. Material for the dam was sent to Big Muddy Creek by barge, then transported to the dam site by a tramway. The dam finished construction in 1923, after which Parau became popular with holidaymakers and retirees, when many of the workers families left. The Big Muddy Creek and Huia valleys reforested in native bush, which impressed residents and sparked much of the movement for the formation of a nature reserve. The Auckland Centennial Memorial Park (which later grew to form the Waitākere Ranges Regional Park) opened in 1940.

A second dam at Parau was constructed between the 1940s and 1960s, known as the Lower Nihotupu Dam. This dam, much closer to the township, flooded most of the flat land where the Laing farm had previously been located.

== Demographics ==
Parau is described by Statistics New Zealand as a rural settlement, and covers 1.48 km^{2} (0.57 sq mi) and had an estimated population of 500 as of June 2025, with a population density of 338 people per km^{2}. It is part of the Oratia statistical area.

Historical population
Year	Pop.	±% p.a.
2006	444	—
2013	474	+0.94%
2018	501	+1.11%
2023	489	−0.48%

Parau had a population of 489 in the 2023 New Zealand census, a decrease of 12 people (−2.4%) since the 2018 census, and an increase of 15 people (3.2%) since the 2013 census. There were 243 males, 243 females and 3 people of other genders in 168 dwellings. 7.4% of people identified as LGBTIQ+. The median age was 41.5 years (compared with 38.1 years nationally). There were 96 people (19.6%) aged under 15 years, 90 (18.4%) aged 15 to 29, 249 (50.9%) aged 30 to 64, and 54 (11.0%) aged 65 or older.

People could identify as more than one ethnicity. The results were 90.2% European (Pākehā); 8.6% Māori; 6.1% Pasifika; 6.1% Asian; 1.2% Middle Eastern, Latin American and African New Zealanders (MELAA); and 4.9% other, which includes people giving their ethnicity as "New Zealander". English was spoken by 98.2%, Māori language by 2.5%, Samoan by 0.6%, and other languages by 11.7%. No language could be spoken by 1.2% (e.g. too young to talk). New Zealand Sign Language was known by 0.6%. The percentage of people born overseas was 27.6, compared with 28.8% nationally.

Religious affiliations were 20.9% Christian, 0.6% Māori religious beliefs, 0.6% Buddhist, 0.6% New Age, and 1.2% other religions. People who answered that they had no religion were 66.9%, and 9.2% of people did not answer the census question.

Of those at least 15 years old, 87 (22.1%) people had a bachelor's or higher degree, 201 (51.1%) had a post-high school certificate or diploma, and 57 (14.5%) people exclusively held high school qualifications. The median income was $46,100, compared with $41,500 nationally. 78 people (19.8%) earned over $100,000 compared to 12.1% nationally. The employment status of those at least 15 was that 219 (55.7%) people were employed full-time, 69 (17.6%) were part-time, and 15 (3.8%) were unemployed.

== Gallery ==
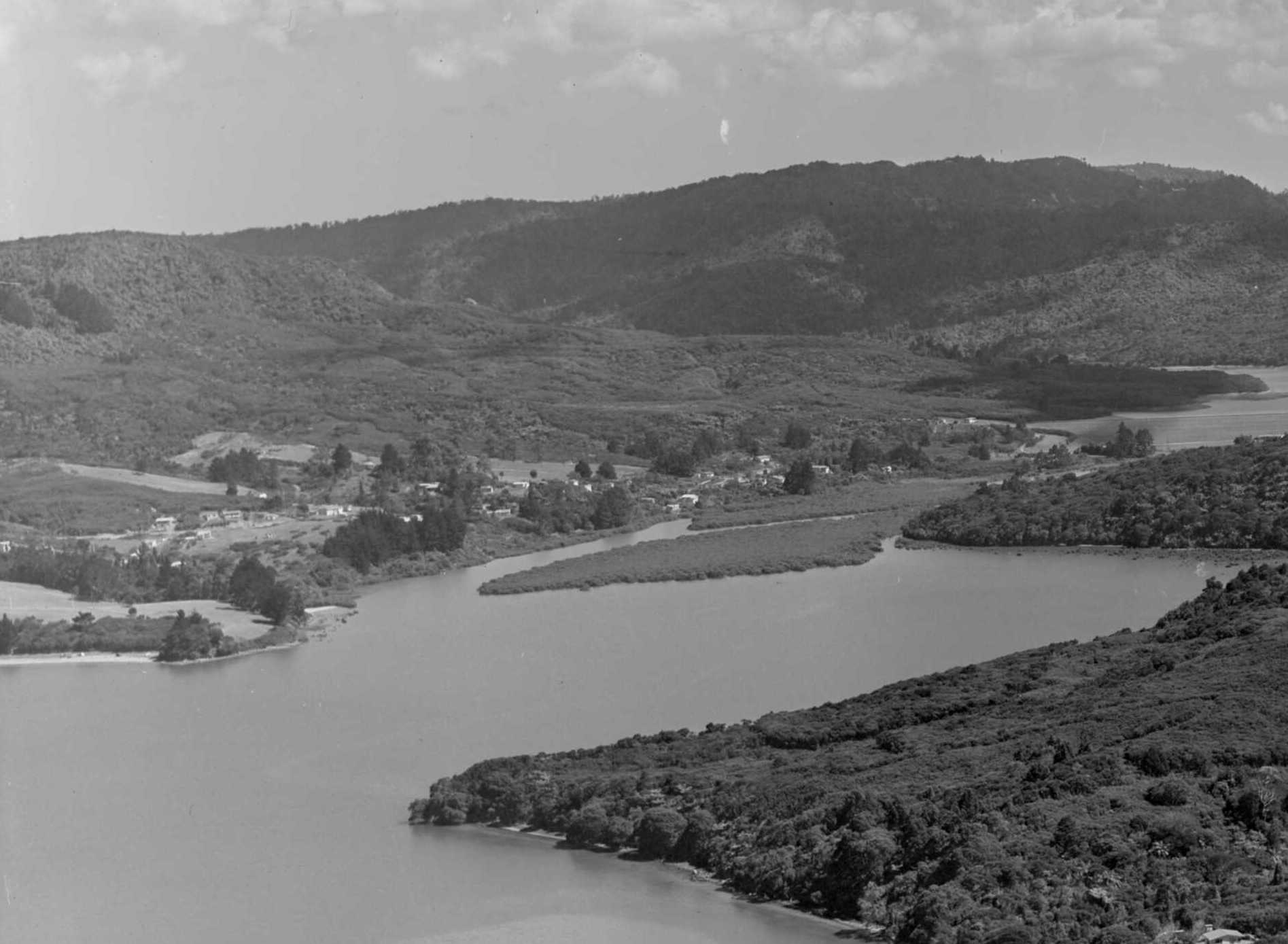
Parau in 1962

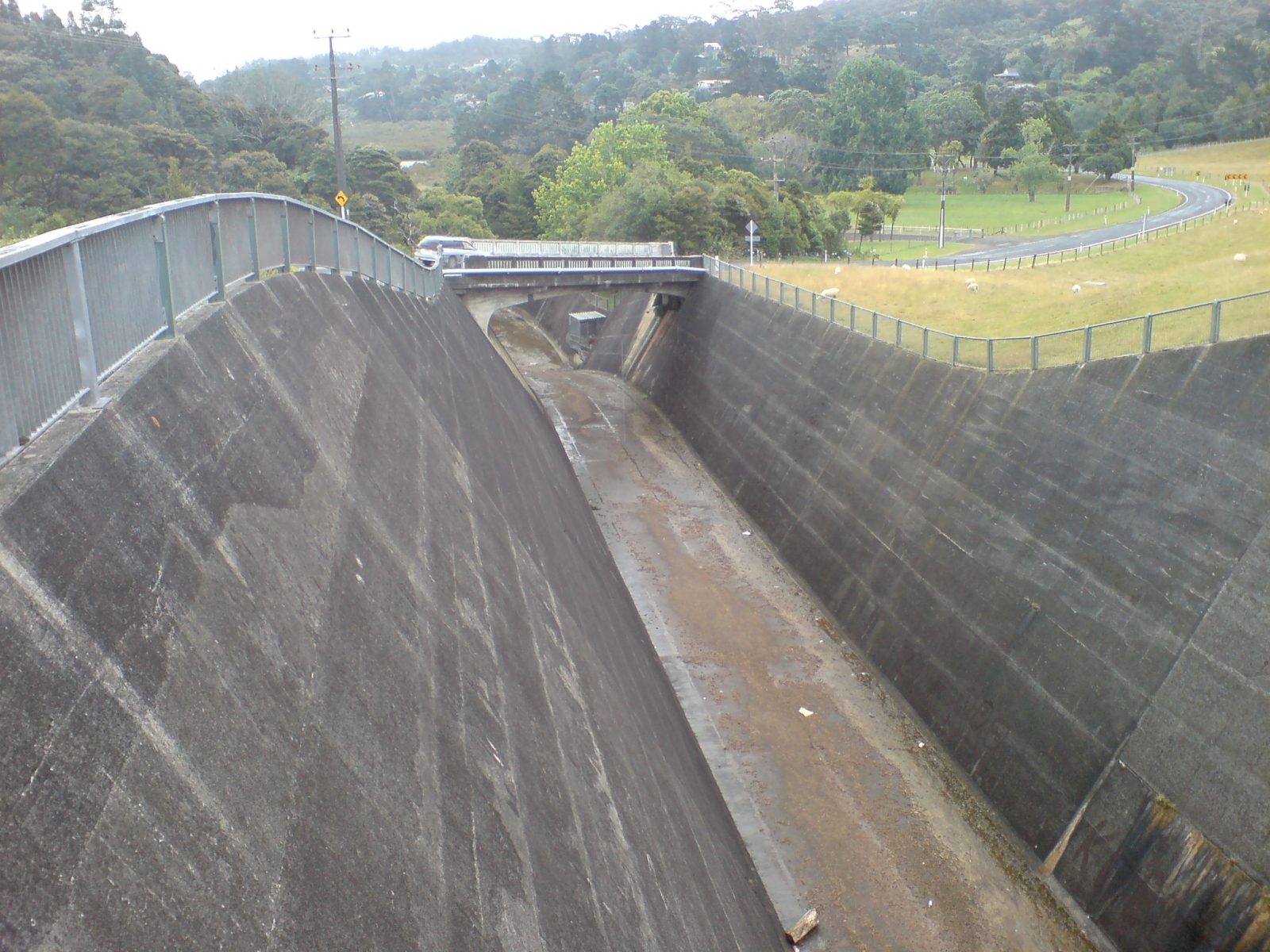
The Lower Nihotupu Dam Spillway

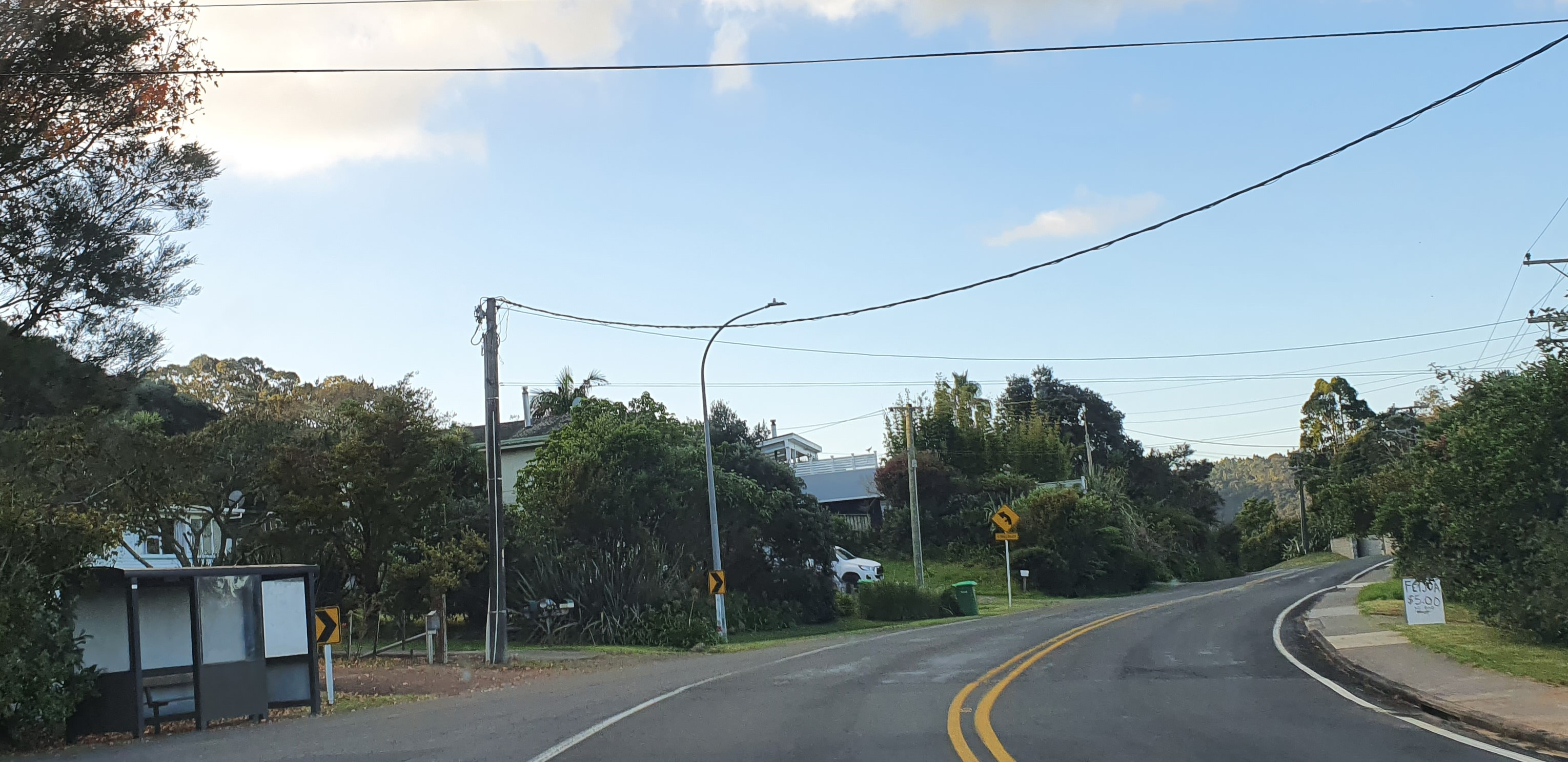
Parau village in 2022

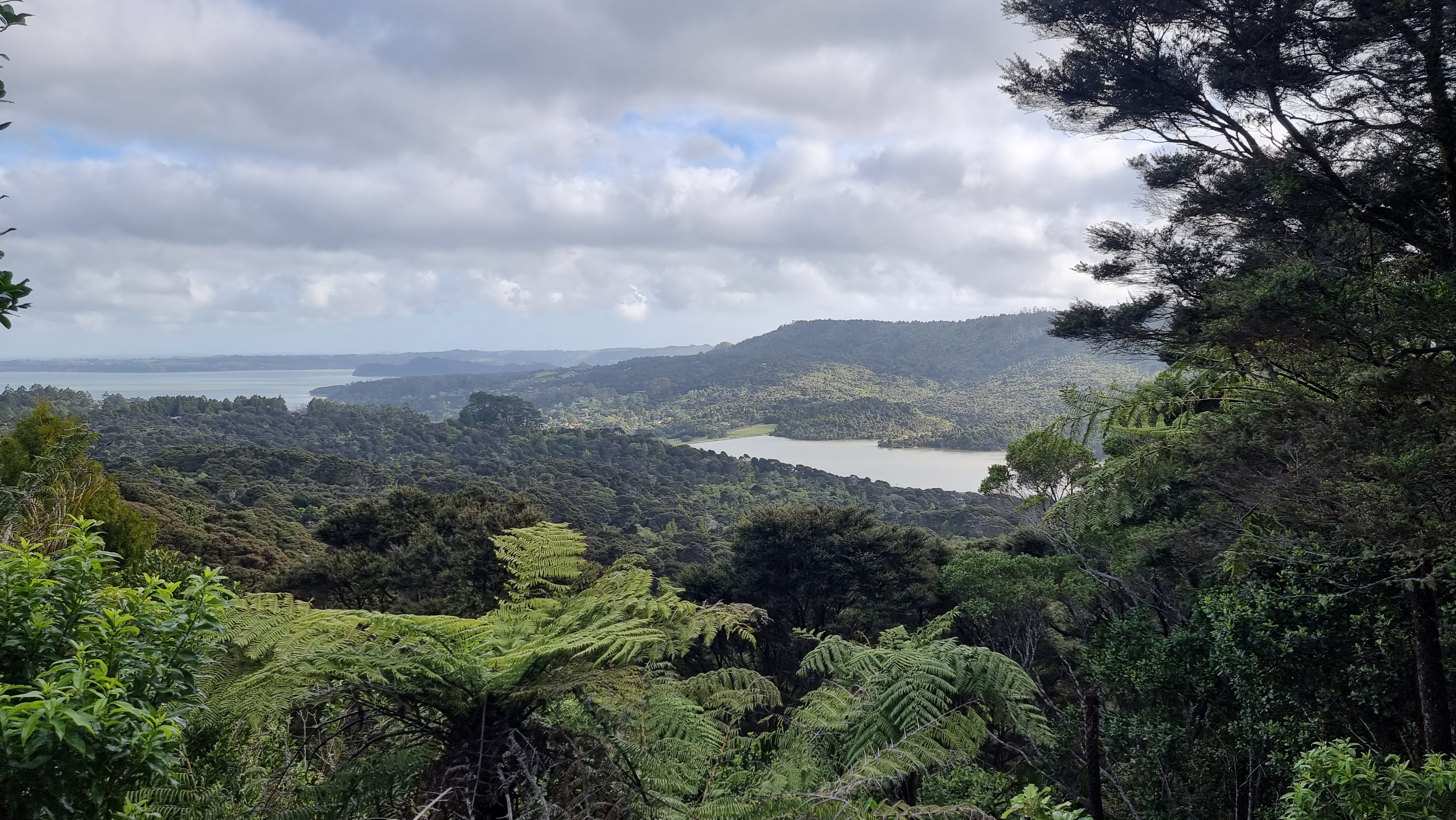
A view of the Lower Nihotupu Dam Lake, looking towards Parau and the Manukau Harbour

== Notes ==
=== References ===
- Harvey, Bruce; Harvey, Trixie (2009). "That Noble Sheet of Water". In Macdonald, Finlay; Kerr, Ruth (eds.). West: The History of Waitakere. Random House. pp. 87–104. ISBN 9781869790080.
- Hodge, Essie (1990). "Early Titirangi". In Northcote-Bade, James (ed.). West Auckland Remembers, Volume 1. West Auckland Historical Society. ISBN 0-473-00983-8.
- La Roche, John (2011). "Auckland's Water Supply". In La Roche, John (ed.). Evolving Auckland: The City's Engineering Heritage. Wily Publications. pp. 27–50. ISBN 9781927167038.
