= Kiwi Tāmaki =

Paramount chief of Waiohua

- Paramount chief of Waiohua
- Reign: Early 18th century – c. 1741
- Predecessor: Te Ika-maupoho
- Born: Maungakiekie, Tāmaki Makaurau
- Died: c. 1741; Paruroa, Waitākere Ranges, Tāmaki Makaurau
- Spouse: Paretutanganui

Kiwi Tāmaki (died c. 1741) (Note: Since the 19th century, the accepted date for the events surrounding Kiwi Tāmaki's death has been 1740, based on the judgment of Francis Dart Fenton of the Ōrākei case of the Native Land Court. In 2003, historian Angela Ballara argued that this was much later due to the genealogy of Apihai Te Kawau, and that the events took place in the 1780s/1790s.) was a Māori warrior and paramount chief of the Waiohua confederation in Tāmaki Makaurau (modern-day Auckland isthmus). The third generation paramount chief of Waiohua, Kiwi Tāmaki consolidated and extended Waiohua power over Tāmaki Makaurau, making it one of the most prosperous and populated areas of Aotearoa. Kiwi Tāmaki's seat of power was at Maungakiekie, which was the most elaborate pā complex in Aotearoa.

Around the year 1740, Kiwi Tāmaki angered Ngāti Whātua tribes to the north-west, by murdering guests at a funeral feast held at South Kaipara. This led the Ngāti Whātua hapū Te Taoū to wage war on Kiwi Tāmaki and the Waiohua confederation, defeating him at a battle in the lower Waitākere Ranges. Kiwi Tāmaki's death signalled the end of the Waiohua mandate in Tāmaki Makaurau, and the beginning of a permanent Ngāti Whātua presence on the isthmus.

Kiwi Tāmaki's direct descendants through his son Rangimatoru became the chiefs of the Te Ākitai Waiohua iwi based in South Auckland and around the Manukau Harbour, while relatives of Kiwi Tāmaki were married to members of Te Taoū who stayed in the region, eventually becoming the modern hapū Ngāti Whātua Ōrākei, based on the Auckland isthmus and Waitematā Harbour.

Much of what is known about Kiwi Tāmaki is through Ngāti Whātua leader and folklore recorder Paora Tūhaere, 19th century court cases in the Māori Land Court, and oral traditions from Tāmaki Māori tribes including Te Ākitai Waiohua, Ngāti Te Ata and Ngāi Tai ki Tāmaki.

== History ==
=== Early life and reign ===
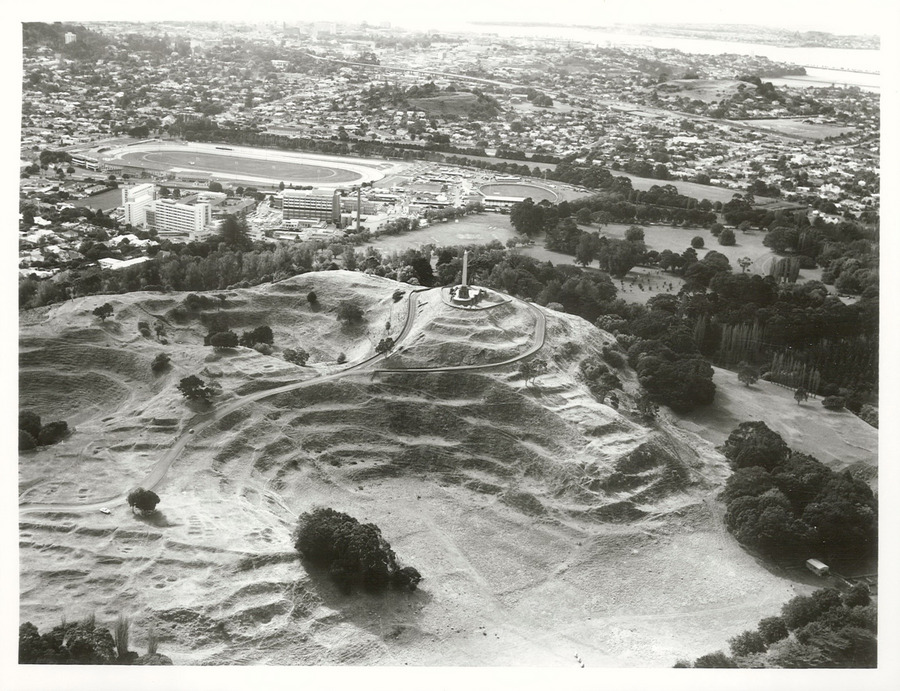
The volcanic peak Maungakiekie / One Tree Hill was the seat of power for Kiwi Tāmaki, and was the location of an elaborate pā complex

Kiwi Tāmaki's grandfather Huakaiwaka was the founder of Waiohua, a union between the Tāmaki Māori tribes of Ngā Oho, Ngā Riki and Ngā Iwi under a single banner. His parents were paramount chief Te Ika-maupoho and Te Tahuri. His mother was from the Waikato tribe Ngāti Mahuta, and was a famed agriculturalist, who managed Nga Māra a Tahuri, extensive kūmara (sweet potato) plantations located between Maungakiekie / One Tree Hill and Onehunga.

Kiwi Tāmaki was born on Maungawhau / Mount Eden. When he was a young leader, Kiwi Tāmaki shifted the seat of power of the Waiohua from Maungawhau to Maungakiekie / One Tree Hill. The 46 hectare Maungakiekie pā complex was the largest pā in the Tāmaki Makaurau region. By 1720, Waiohua confederation were thriving under the leadership of Kiwi Tāmaki, and had established pā and kāinga at most of the volcanic peaks of the Auckland isthmus and the Māngere peninsula, including Maungarei / Mount Wellington, Māngere Mountain / Te Pane-o-Mataaho, Ihumātao, Onehunga, Remuera, Omahu, Te Umuponga at Ōrākei, Kohimarama, Taurarua (Point Resolution in Parnell), Te Tō (Freemans Bay), Rarotonga / Mount Smart, Te Tatua-a-Riukiuta / Three Kings and Ōwairaka / Mount Albert. Kiwi Tāmaki primarily stayed at Maungakiekie, but would also shift seasonally between the different pā throughout Tāmaki Makaurau, based on when the harvest times for various seafood, bird and vegetables were. He was based at Māngere during the Manukau Harbour shark season and at Te Tō (Freemans Bay) during the Waitematā Harbour shark season. During the migratory season of the kākā parrot, Kiwi was based at Ngutuwera (in modern-day Chatswood on the North Shore) where birds could be snared in the forested gullies, and at Te Pāhī (Herald Island). When it was time to preserve the birds, Kiwi Tāmaki moved to Ōwairaka / Mount Albert.

The Maungakiekie pā complex (also known as Te Tōtara-i-āhua, after a tōtara tree planted at the peak of the mountain to commemorate the birth of a rangatira) could house as many as 4,000 people. Kiwi Tāmaki's rule is associated with the time of the greatest unity and strength of the Waiohua confederation, and was one of the most prosperous and populated areas of Aotearoa prior to the arrival of Europeans.

Kiwi Tāmaki owned a gigantic pahū pounamu, a greenstone gong, that could be heard from across the isthmus as a calling for warriors to assemble, especially in times of war. It was known as Whakarewa-tāhuna ("Lifted from the Banks of the Sea"), and was located at either Maungakiekie or Maungawhau. The gong had been in possession by Tāmaki Māori for generations, however was hidden near Maungawhau during the end of Kiwi Tāmaki's reign and never recovered.

Kiwi Tāmaki married Paretutanganui (who descended from the Waiohua hapū Ngāti Te Aua and Ngāti Pare), and together they had a son, Rangimatoru. Kiwi Tāmaki's sister Waikahina (also known as Waikahuia) was married to Mana, a chief of Te Kawerau ā Maki, the iwi who primarily resided in West Auckland and the Waitākere Ranges. Together they lived at Mangonui (modern-day Chatswood on the North Shore). Alternatively, according to Ngāti Tamaoho tradition, Waikahina married Noia, a Ngāti Pou chief who settled at Te Maketū (Drury) in South Auckland, after fleeing the isthmus. Kahutoroa, another sister of Kiwi Tāmaki, married Tautini of Ngāti Tāhinga.

While there are many explanations for the etymology of Māori language name for Auckland, Tāmaki Makaurau ("Tāmaki of a Hundred Lovers"), one tradition links the name to Kiwi Tāmaki.

=== Massacre at the Ngāti Whātua funeral feast ===
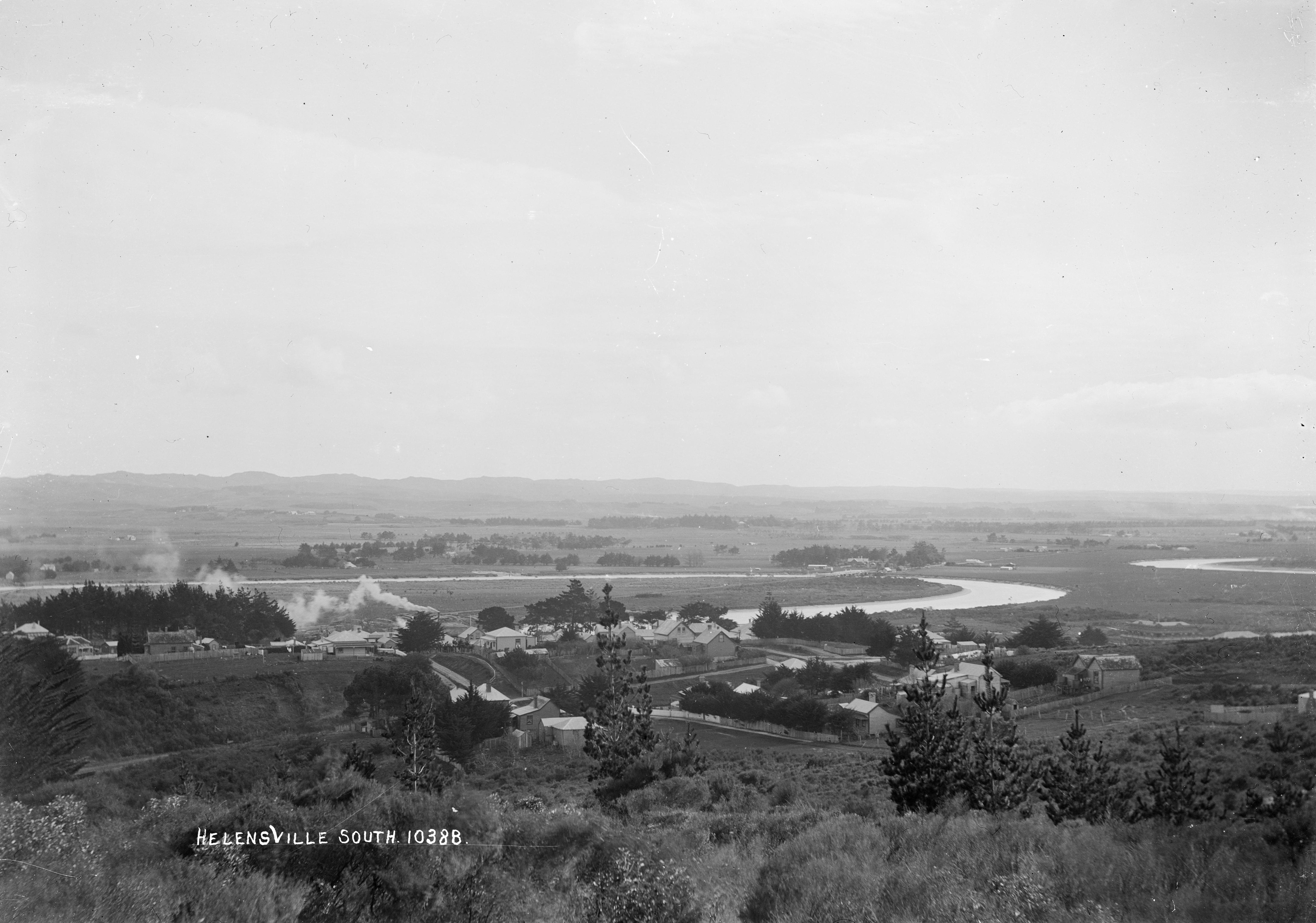
The Ngāti Whātua settlements along the Kaipara River, Waitūoro and Mimihānui (near modern-day Parakai and Helensville) were the site of Waiohua's attack on Te Taoū

Waiohua's relationship with Te Taoū and Ngāti Whātua tribes was complex. The Kaipara River area was an unstable borderland between Ngāti Whātua, Te Kawerau ā Maki and Waiohua, which over time intensified, as Ngāti Whātua pushed further south and grew in numbers. Unacceptable killings began a cycle of revenge raids between the parties. Many high-ranking members of Ngāti Whātua were also close relatives of the Waiohua ruling class, such as Tuperiri and Kiwi Tāmaki, who were cousins.

One chief of Ngāti Whātua who had ties to both Ngāti Whātua and Waiohua was Te Raraku (of the hapū Ngāti Rongo). Te Raraku was a Ngāti Whātua leader based on the south of the Kaipara River, who fought with Te Taoū over border issues, and led a faction of Ngāti Whātua who were opposed to Te Taoū. Kiwi Tāmaki agreed to support Raraku's cause, as the Waiohua people had suffered historic raids by Ngāti Whātua warriors led by the Tainui warrior Kawharu, and waited for an opportune time.

Around the year 1740, Kiwi Tāmaki attended the uhunga (funeral rites) commemorating the death of Te Taoū rangatira and great warrior Tumupākihi. Tumupākihi was one of the warriors who secured Ngāti Whātua hegemony in the area, pushing Ngā Iwi (Waiohua) residents further south. A memorial feast was held at Waitūoro, close to Parakai and modern-day Helensville. During the feast, Kiwi Tāmaki and Waiohua forces, assisted by Ngāi Tai rangatira Te Rangikaketu, descended on the guests and massacred members of Te Taoū. The deaths included Te Taoū rangatira Te Huru and Te Kaura, Tumupakihi's son Tapuwae, while others including Kahurautao of Ngāti Maru and members of the Ngāpuhi hapū Ngāti Rua-Ngaio may have been among the dead.

After the massacre, the Waiohua war party travelled to Mimihānui pā, close by along the Kaipara River, and murdered Tahatahi and Tangihua, the sisters of the Ngāti Whātua rangatira Tuperiri. They pursued the surviving members of Te Taoū further south to the pā at Te Mākiri (Te Awaroa / Helensville), confronting Tuperiri and Waha-akiaki, two prominent members of Te Taoū who managed to survive. Waha-akiaki was the son of Tumupakihi, who the funeral had been held for. At Te Mākiri, Kiwi Tāmaki and Waha-akiaki exchanged kanga (threatening curses):

Kiwi Tāmaki: "Heoi anō tō kōuma āpōpō e iri ana i te rākau i Tōtara-i-āhua" / "Tomorrow your breast bone will hang on the tree on Tōtara-i-āhua (Maungakiekie) (Note: Tōtara-i-āhua ("The Lone Tōtara Tree") is a name for the peak of Maungakiekie / One Tree Hill. In some retellings, the location is Kai-arero, a location on the northern slopes of Maungakiekie / One Tree Hill where a pōhutukawa tree grew.)"
Waha-akiaki: "Kia pēnei, āpōpō tō kōuma e iri ana i te pūriri i Maunga-a-Ngū" / "It will be like this, tomorrow your 10 breast bones will hang on the pūriri tree on Maunga-a-Ngū (a hill at Te Awaroa / Helensville)"
Kiwi Tāmaki: "E kore a Kiwi e mate, mā Rēhua-i-te-rangi e kī iho kia mate" / "Kiwi will not die, unless Rēhua-i-terangi says so"

Rēhua-i-te-rangi is a god of the Antares associated with the summer, who Kiwi Tāmaki believed resided within his body. After the exchange of threats, Kiwi Tāmaki and the Waiohua war party returned to Tāmaki Makaurau.

=== War with Te Taoū ===
Places mentioned in the war between Ngāti Whātua and Waiohua
1 Kaipara (including Waitūoro, Mimihānui pā, Maunga-a-Ngū)
2 Maungakiekie / One Tree Hill
3 Taurere
4 Karangahape Peninsula
5 Āwhitu Peninsula
6 Paruroa (Big Muddy Creek)
7 Māngere Mountain

The massacre and the extreme breach of Ngāti Whātua manaakitanga (hospitality) were seen as powerful reasons to retaliate against the Waiohua, and a Te Taoū taua was formed.

The first wave of attacks were by a Te Taoū taua of 100 men raised by Waha-akiaki. This force advanced as far southeast as Titirangi, defeating Kiwi Tāmaki's forces so badly that Kiwi Tāmaki retreated to the safety of Maungakiekie. Bypassing the pā of the isthmus, the taua travelled to Te Taurere (Taylors Hill) to the east at the mouth of the Tāmaki River, storming the pā and killing Waiohua chief Takapunga. After further skirmishes, the taua retreated to the Kaipara area, however did not feel that this was enough to compensate for the feast massacre. In retaliation, a Waiohua taua invaded the Kaipara area, killing a number of important Ngāti Whātua chiefs.

The second wave of attacks was made by a taua of 240 men, under the joint leadership of Tuperiri, Waha-akiaki and Tuperiri's half-brother Waitaheke, and were intended as a way to entice Kiwi Tāmaki away from the safety of the Maungakiekie pā. The taua travelled south and camped on the Karangahape Peninsula (modern Cornwallis), constructing rafts made of raupō (bulrushes), crossing the Manukau Heads overnight and reaching the Āwhitu Peninsula. The war party launched a surprise attacks on the Āwhitu pā and the powerful Tara-ataua pā at the south of the peninsula, slaughtering the residents. The taua pursued the fleeing occupants as far south as Papakura, and attacked the Puke-Horo-Katoa pā at the north of the peninsula, however were unable to take the pā and retreated across the Manukau Harbour back to the south Waitākere Ranges, regrouping at Paruroa (Big Muddy Creek).

=== Battle of Te-Rangi-hinganga-tahi ===
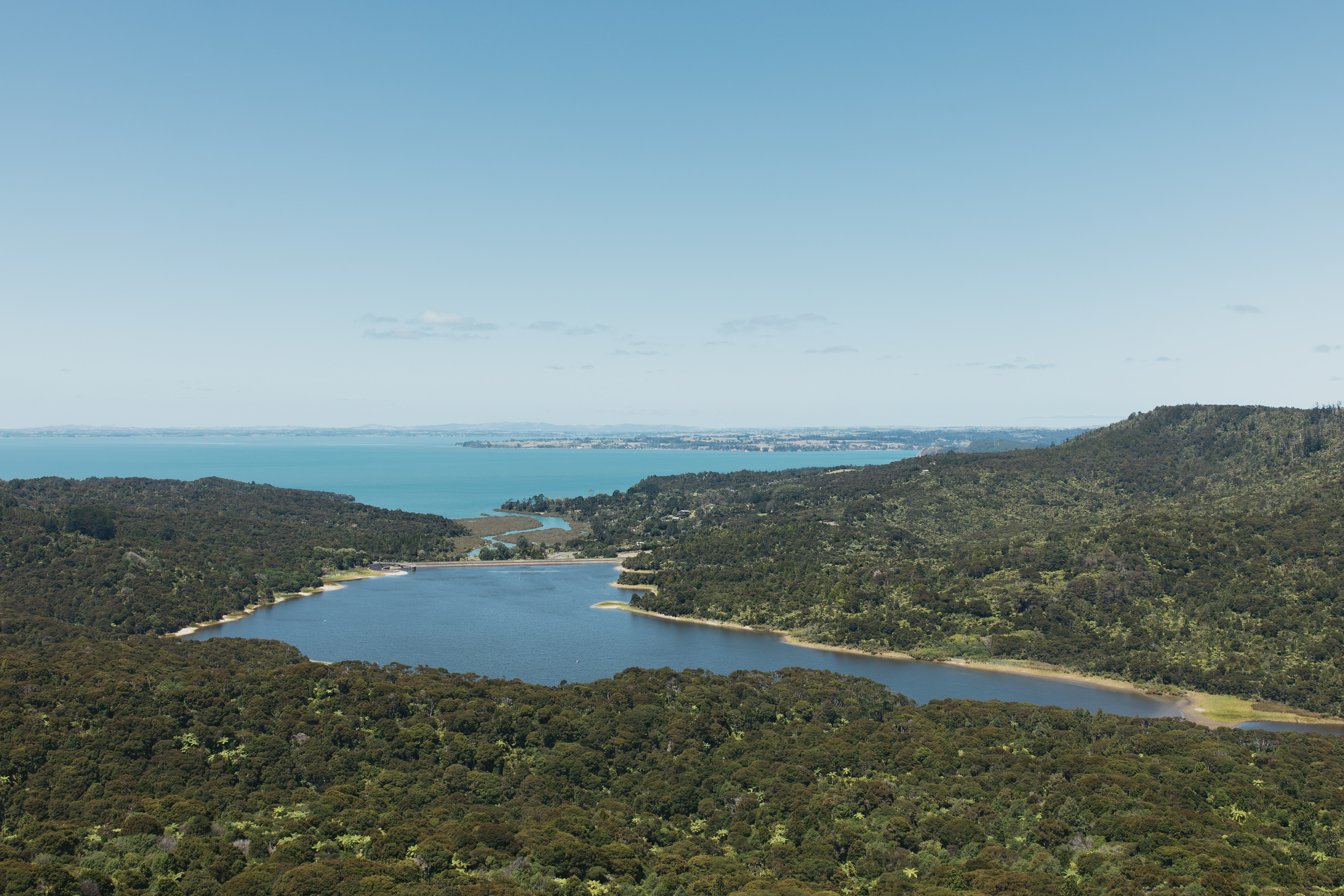
The site of Te-Rangi-hinganga-tahi, looking south towards Parau. Much of the battlefield is covered by the modern Lower Nihotupu Reservoir

Kiwi Tāmaki, livid at the attacks on the Āwhitu Peninsula, sounded the pahu (drum) and pūkaea (war trumpet) of Maungakiekie and surrounding settlements to notify the Waiohua chiefs to assemble for war. Warriors from across Tāmaki joined the war party, including those from Maungekiekie, Te Tātua-o-Riukiuta (Thee Kings), Ōwairaka / Mount Albert, Onehunga, Māngere, Ihumātao and Moerangi / Mount Gabriel. The Waiohua war party, numbering between 3,000 and 4,000 warriors compared to Wahiakiaki's 120, descended on the Te Taoū camp at Paruroa, travelling by land and sea.

Vastly outnumbered, Waha-akiaki ordered his warriors to adopt a hawaiki-pepeke strategy, a feigned retreat to draw in the enemy. As the warriors arrived, Waha-akiaki told his brother Waitaheke, "let the bird be drawn into the snare", while they pursued the Te Taoū force further up the creek. Waha-akiaki told the men to continue up the creek until they could see the Waitematā Harbour (likely close to the site of the modern-day Arataki Visitor Centre on Scenic Drive, Auckland), and when this happened, dropped a hue (calabash bottle) full of oil on the ground as a signal for his men to turn around and attack.

Waha-akiaki rushed towards Kiwi Tāmaki, recognisable by his chiefly hair plumes. Both fell to the ground, but during the struggle Waha-akiaki managed to grab his stone patu, striking Kiwi Tāmaki and killing him. His death instantly demoralised the Waiohua force, who fell back towards the Manukau Harbour. While fleeing, many were killed on the seashore, which was the origin of the name of the battle, Te-Rangi-hinganga-tahi ("The Day When All Fell Together"), named so because the large number of corpses desecrated the area and polluted the local shellfish beds. After his death, Kiwi Tāmaki was cut open by the warriors. According to retellings, the God Rēhua-i-te-rangi was found inside of his body, in the shape of a reptile. A Te Taoū warrior consumed the God, however soon died because of eating it.

Kiwi Tāmaki's breastbone was taken back to Kaipara and hung upon a tree, (Note: Variously a tree atop Maunga-a-Ngū in modern Helensville, or a pūriri tree on Tauwhare (opposite Reweti Marae at Waimauku), further south along the river.) as Waha-akiaki had cursed. Tuperiri, unsatisfied that the deaths did not make up for the deaths of his sisters, confronted Waha-akiaki, and together they convinced all Ngāti Whātua hapū to attack the region together.

=== Aftermath ===
After the Waiohua hegemony in Tāmaki Makaurau fell, as the Te Taoū war party were easily able to defeat most of the central isthmus pā. Many Waiohua fled to the Franklin District and the Waikato, or were enslaved. Te Taoū believed the result of this war was take raupatu (land right through conquest), and Tuperiri along with most of the Te Taoū contingent stayed on the isthmus, building a pā below the summit of Maungakiekie, which they called Hikurangi. Waiohua remained at locations along the Waitematā Harbour and at Māngere Mountain. (Note: Retellings vary as to whether the Waiohua people of these locations returned after a period of time, or never left.) Members of Ngāti Whātua who were not Te Taoū, formed a taua to avenge the deaths of Te Huru and Taura, and attacked the settlements of the twin brother Waiohua chiefs Hupipi and Humataitai. The settlements at Ōrākei, Kohimarama and Taurarua fell over the course of a few days and most residents were slaughtered, before the war party returned to Kaipara.

The final battle against Waiohua was held at Māngere Mountain, which Tuperiri took as revenge for the deaths of his sisters. The mountain was the location where many of the Waiohua soldiers regrouped, and as a defense, had strewn pipi shells around the base of the mountain to warn against attacks. Te Taoū warriors covered the pipi shells with dogskin cloaks to muffle the sound, and raided the pā at dawn. The mountain gained the name Te Ara Pueru ("the dogskin cloak path") in reference to this event. It is unclear if storming the Māngere pā occurred immediately after the capture of the isthmus, or many years later.

Members of Waiohua who were enslaved or allowed to return to the isthmus intermarried with Te Taoū, eventually forming the hapū known as Ngāti Whātua Ōrākei. Many hapū of Waiohua did not intermarry with Ngāti Whātua, including Te Ākitai Waiohua, Ngāti Tamaoho and Ngāti Te Ata. Despite fighting against Te Taoū, Te Rangikaketu and his Ngāi Tai relatives were allowed to continue to occupy ancestral lands at Mutukaroa / Hamlins Hill, Rarotonga / Mount Smart and Ōtāhuhu / Mount Richmond, as Te Rangikaketu had warned members of Te Taoū to be armed and wary around Kiwi Tāmaki.

== Descendants ==
Kiwi Tāmaki is considered the progenitor and founding ancestor of Te Ākitai Waiohua. The chiefs of Te Ākitai Waiohua directly descend from Kiwi Tāmaki through his son Rangimatoru. Kiwi Tāmaki's great-grandson, Ihaka Taka-anini, is the namesake of the South Auckland suburb of Takanini, while the suburb Wiri is named after his great-great-grandson, Te Wirihana Takaanini.

== See also ==
- Te Waiohua
