= Waitakere Tramline =

Dam reservoir in Auckland, New Zealand

Coordinates: 36.8918°S 174.5495°E

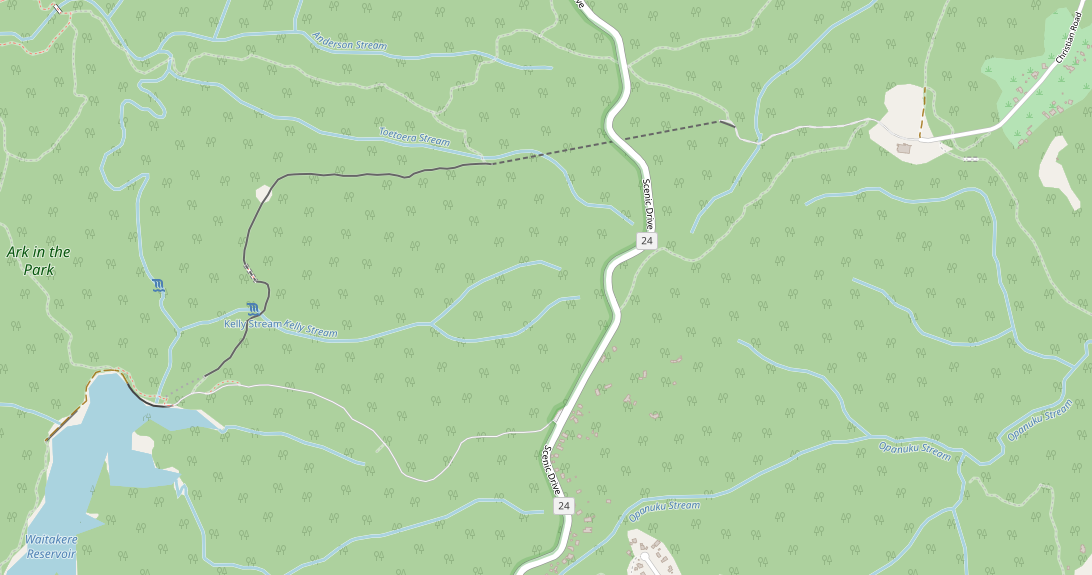

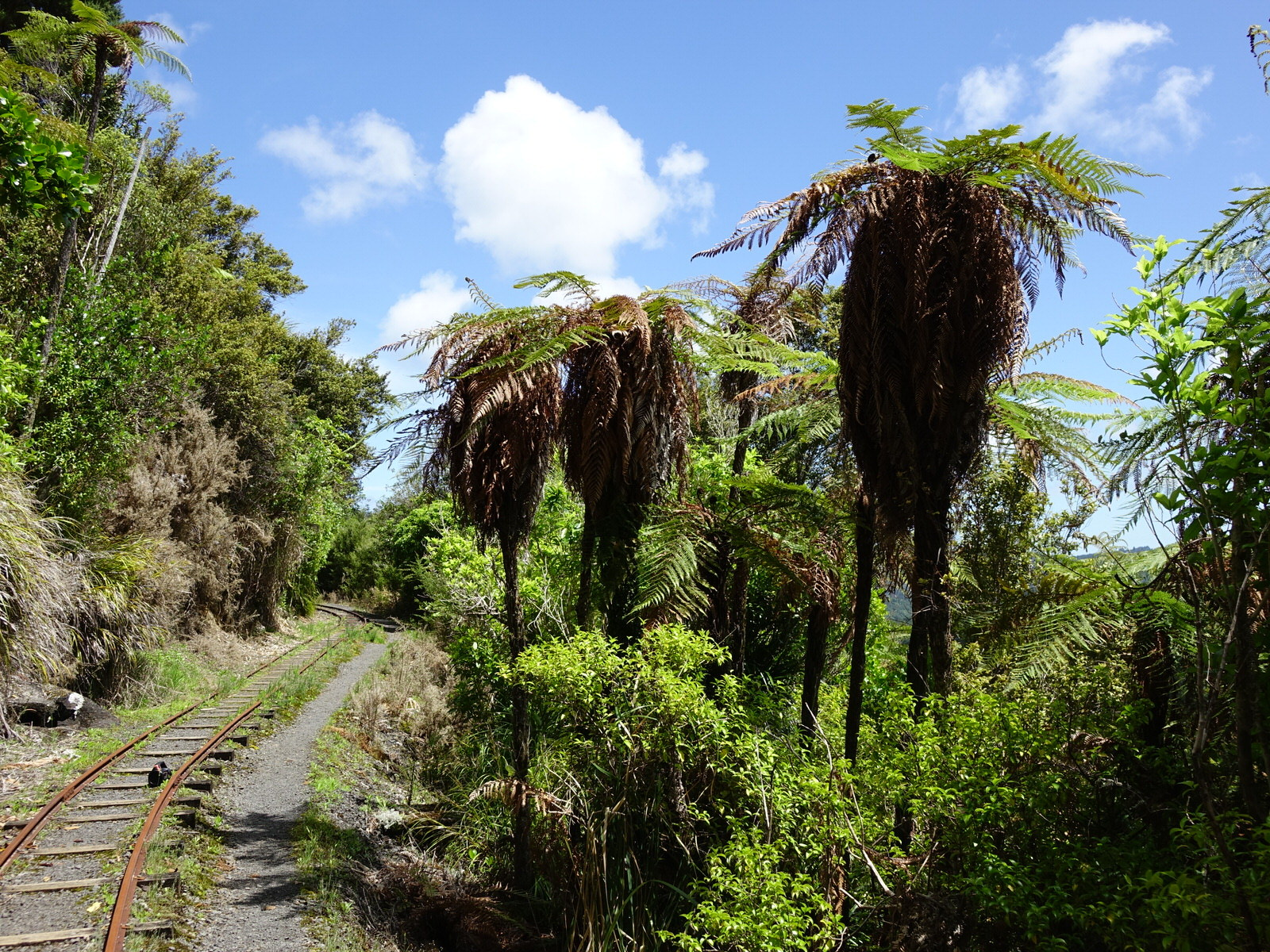
- The Waitakere Tramline passing some Dicksonia squarrosa (New Zealand tree ferns)

Technical
- Line length: 2.5 kilometres (1.6 mi)
- Track gauge: Previously 2 ft 6 in (762 mm); Now 2 ft (610 mm)

The Waitakere Tramline is a 2.5 kilometres (1.6 mi) long industrial narrow gauge railway near Swanson in the Waitākere Ranges south-west of Auckland in New Zealand, which is being used since 1907 for building and maintaining the dam and water pipeline at the Waitākere Reservoir. It was used until 2014 also by the Waitakere Tramline Society Inc. for tourist excursions, which have been indefinitely ceased due to a risk assessment.

== Location ==
The track with an original gauge of 2 ft 6 in (762 mm), which has later been regauged to 2 ft (610 mm) started originally at Swanson railway station and ran to a point above the Filter Station. From there it runs to the dam at Waitākere Reservoir. The lower section of the rail track from Swanson up beyond the Filter Station was lifted c. 1927.

== Rolling stock ==
One of the locomotives was built in 1976, refurbished in 1985 and during its second refurbishment in 2000 equipped with a 16 hp Kubota diesel engine and a variable hydraulic drive. Most of the carriages were built in 1978 and upgraded in the 1990s to allow for smoother and more comfortable ride.

== Damages and discontinuation of tourist transport ==
In November 2011, a leak in the adjacent 600mm diameter main water pipe triggered a substantial slip, taking out a 15m long section of the tramline with 6m of track left dangling in the air.

In November 2014, the Waitakere and Nihotupu tramline were closed for tourist transport on 24 November 2014, but the Waitakere tramline is still used by Watercare for maintenance of the dam and pipeline. Sections of the track can be seen from the Waitakere Tramline Loop Track, which follows the old tramline through some of its tunnels.

== See also ==
- Nihotupu Tramline
- Upper Nihotupu Reservoir
