= Nihotupu Tramline =

Bush tramline in Auckland, New Zealand

Coordinates: 36.9483°S 174.5747°E

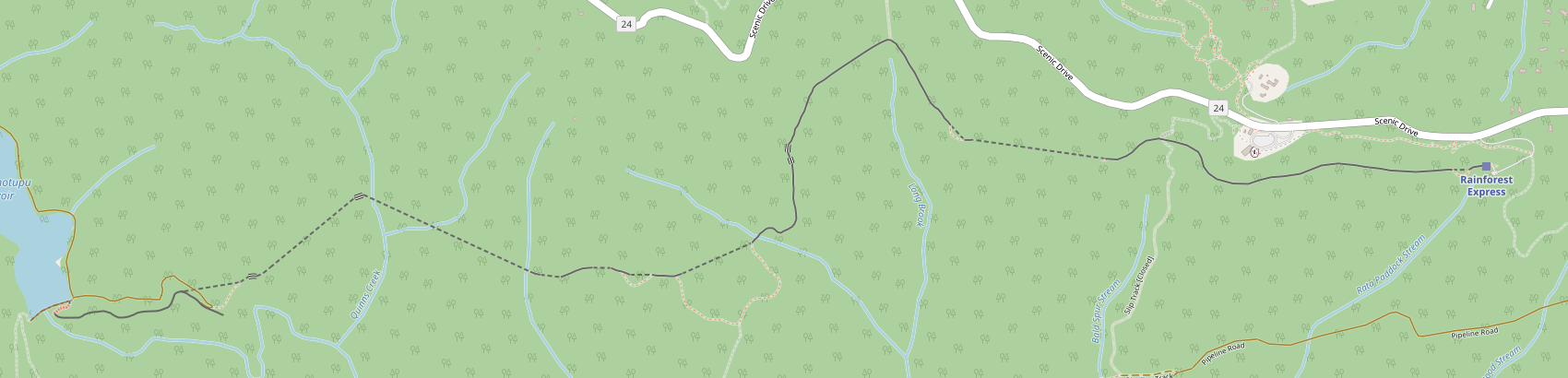

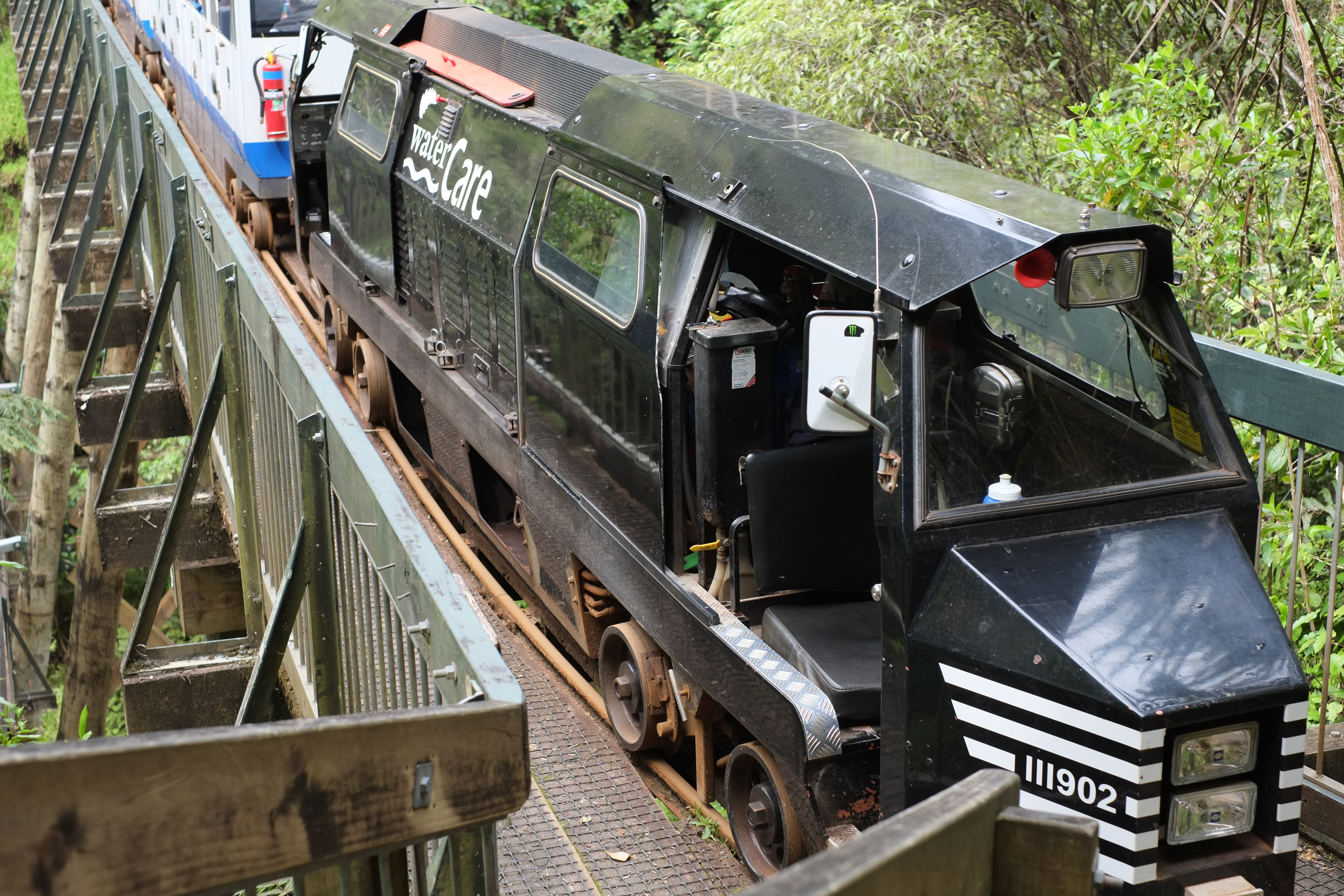
- Rain Forest Express bush tram stop on Quinns Viaduct.jpg

Technical
- Line length: 6.5 kilometres (4.0 mi)
- Track gauge: Previously 2 ft 6 in (762 mm); Currently 2 ft (610 mm)

The Nihotupu Tramline is a 6.5 kilometres (4.0 mi) long industrial narrow gauge railway at Nihotupu in the Waitākere Ranges south-west of Auckland in New Zealand, which since 1907 has been used for building and maintaining the dam and water pipeline at the Upper Nihotupu Reservoir. It was used until 24 November 2014 also by the Rainforest Express for tourist excursions, which have been indefinitely ceased due to a risk assessment.

== Location ==
The tramline runs through the Waitakere Ranges from Jacobsons' Depot to Seaver Camp near the dam at Upper Nihotupu Reservoir. The track had an original gauge of 2 ft 6 in (762 mm), later being regauged to 2 ft (610 mm). The route includes 10 tunnels and 9 bridges.

== Rolling stock ==
One of the locomotives is a 3 tonne diesel-hydraulic unit, powered by a 40-horsepower Isuzu diesel engine with a maximum speed of about 14 kilometres per hour (8.7 mph). It has enclosed cabs at both ends with sliding doors for the driver.

== Accidents ==
The Rain Forest Express had transported over 58,000 passengers during its time serving tourists. There were three accidents resulting in injured passengers during that period of time, two of whom required hospital treatment.

Another incident occurred on 4 May 2002, when a child fell from a carriage of Rain Forest Express Train No 1337 while it was travelling through Tunnel 29. The child was seriously injured when he was crushed between the 610 mm diameter water pipeline and the moving train, causing the derailment of a bogie on two carriages. None of the previous accidents had involved passengers falling from the train. Subsequently, a barrier was installed on the open side of the carriages, so that children standing on the seats could not fall out. As a conclusion of a risk assessment, a stiffening aluminium rod was to be installed at the top of the vinyl doors of the carriages.

== Gallery ==
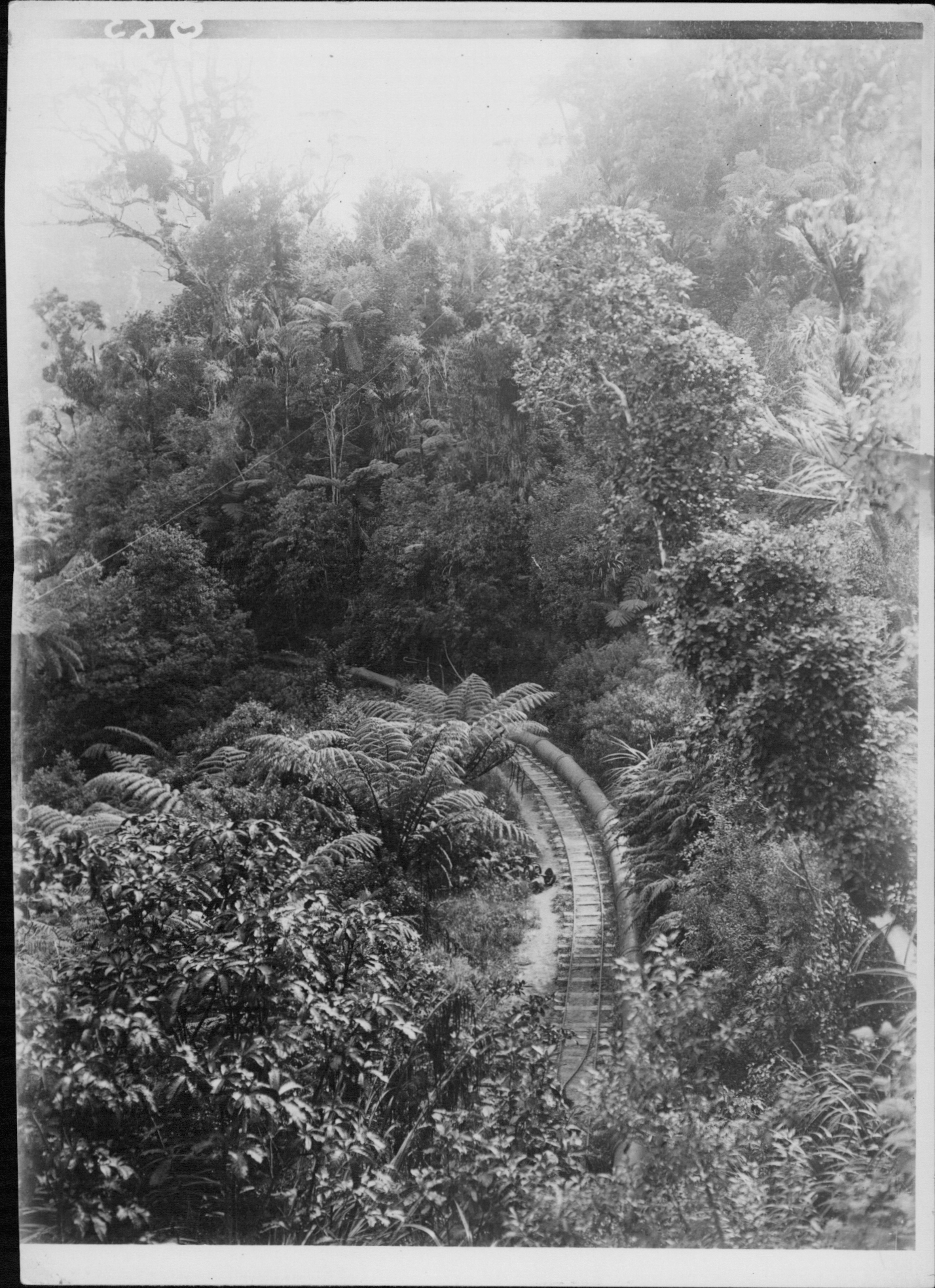
Nihotupu Tramline, 1919

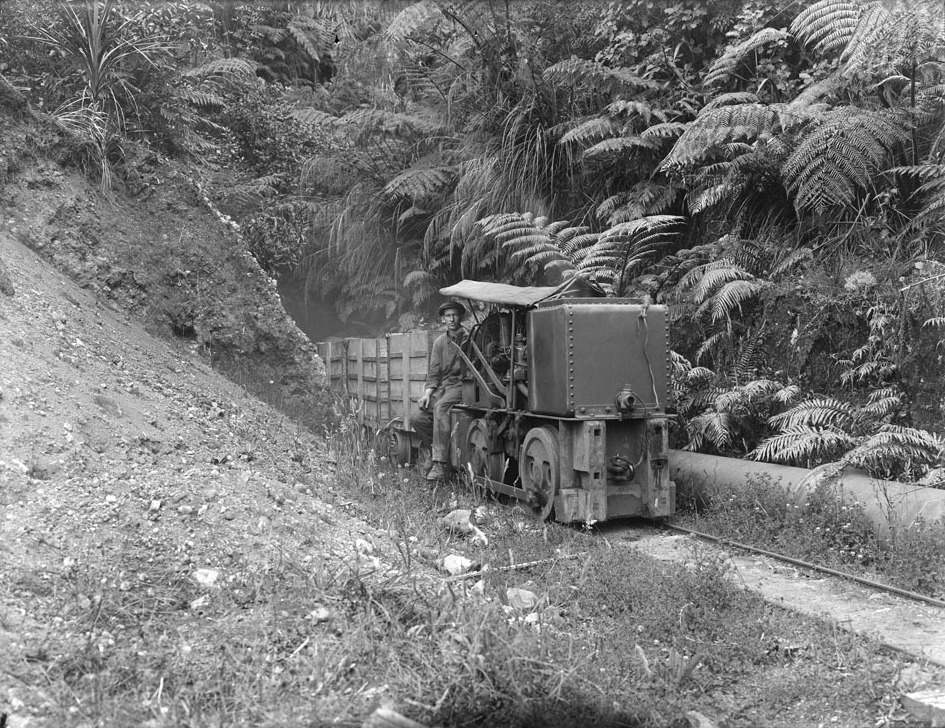
Nihotupu Tramline, 1923

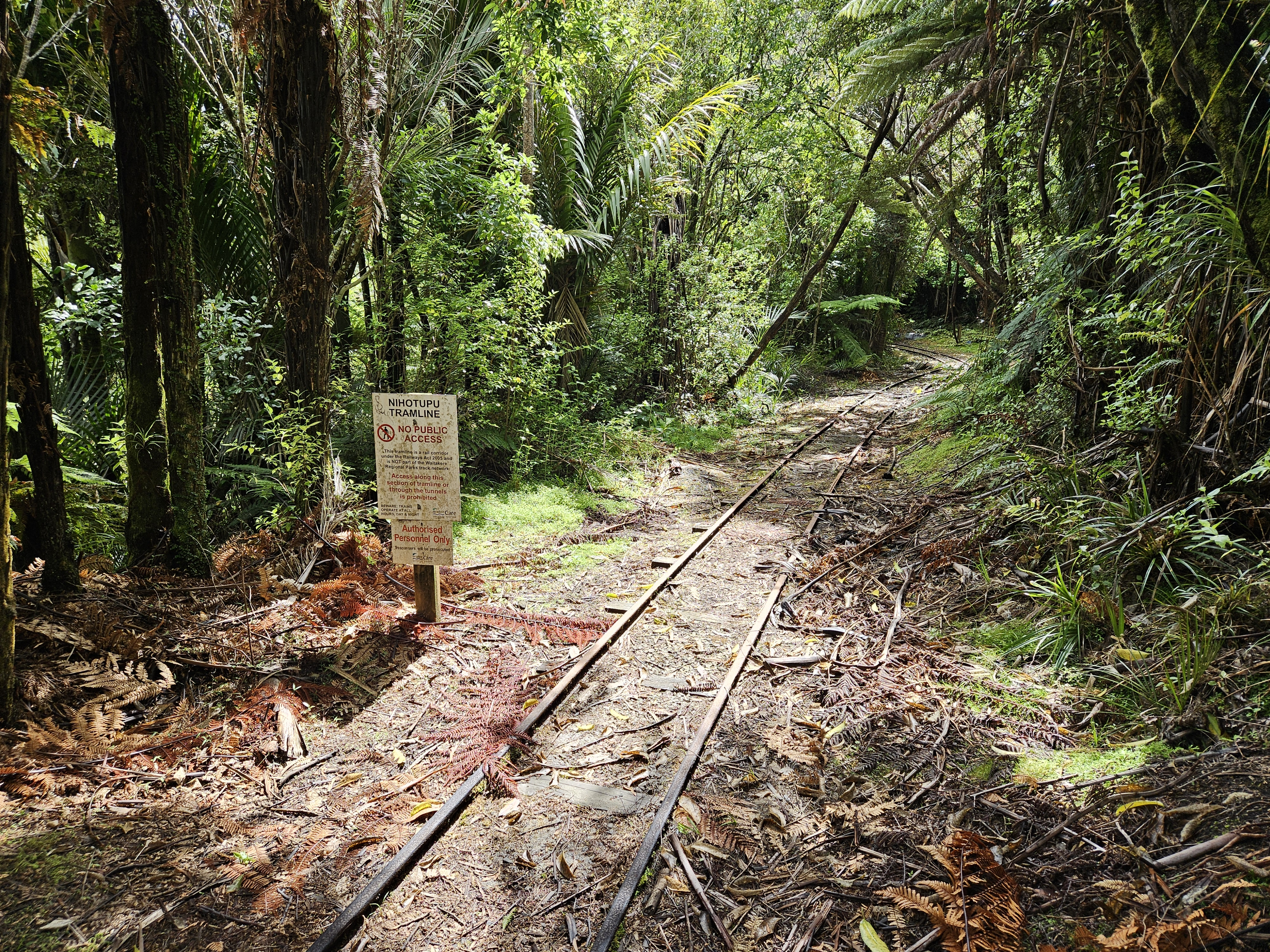
Nihotupu Tramline in the Waitākere Ranges in 2023

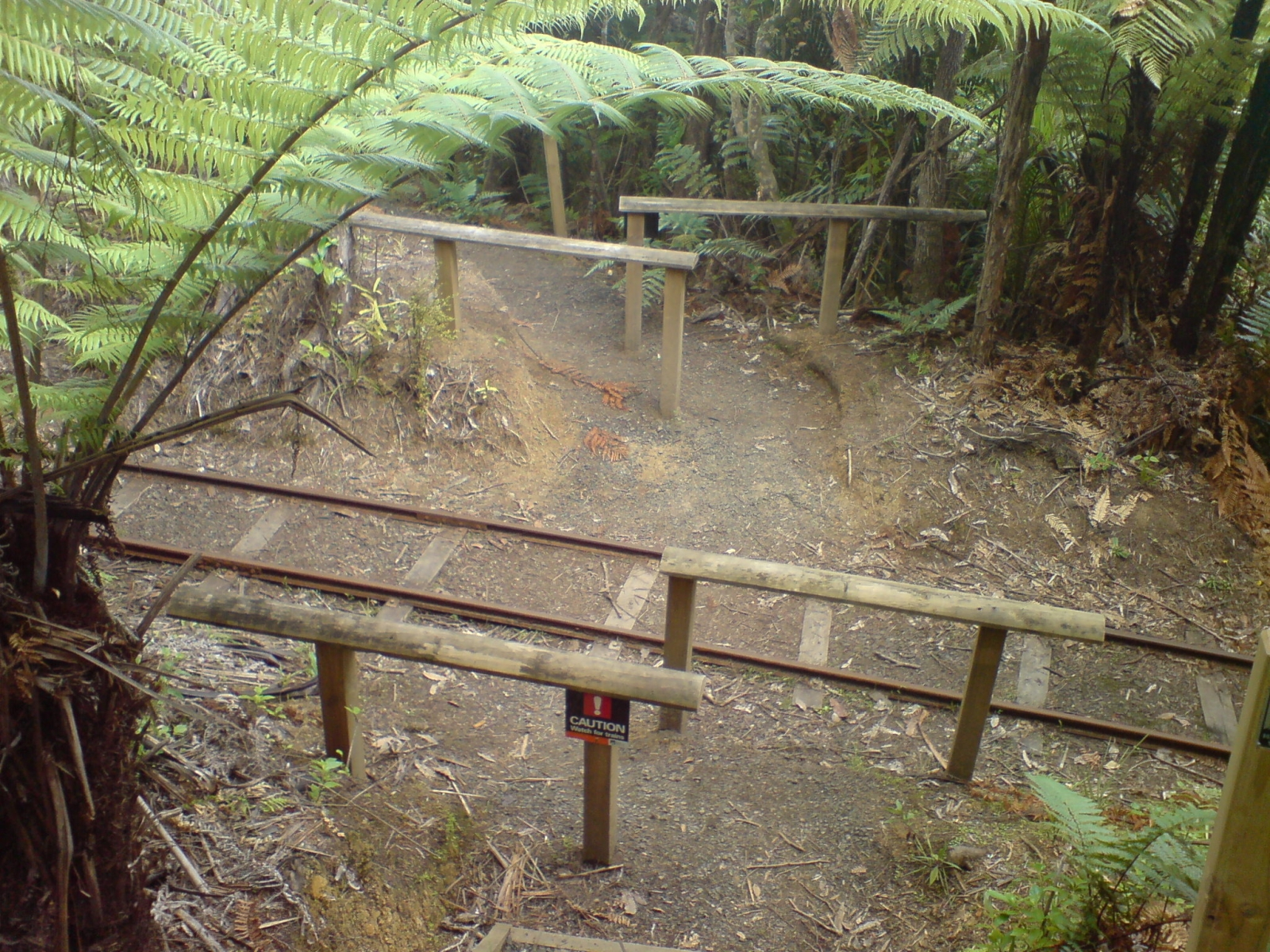
Level crossing in 2011

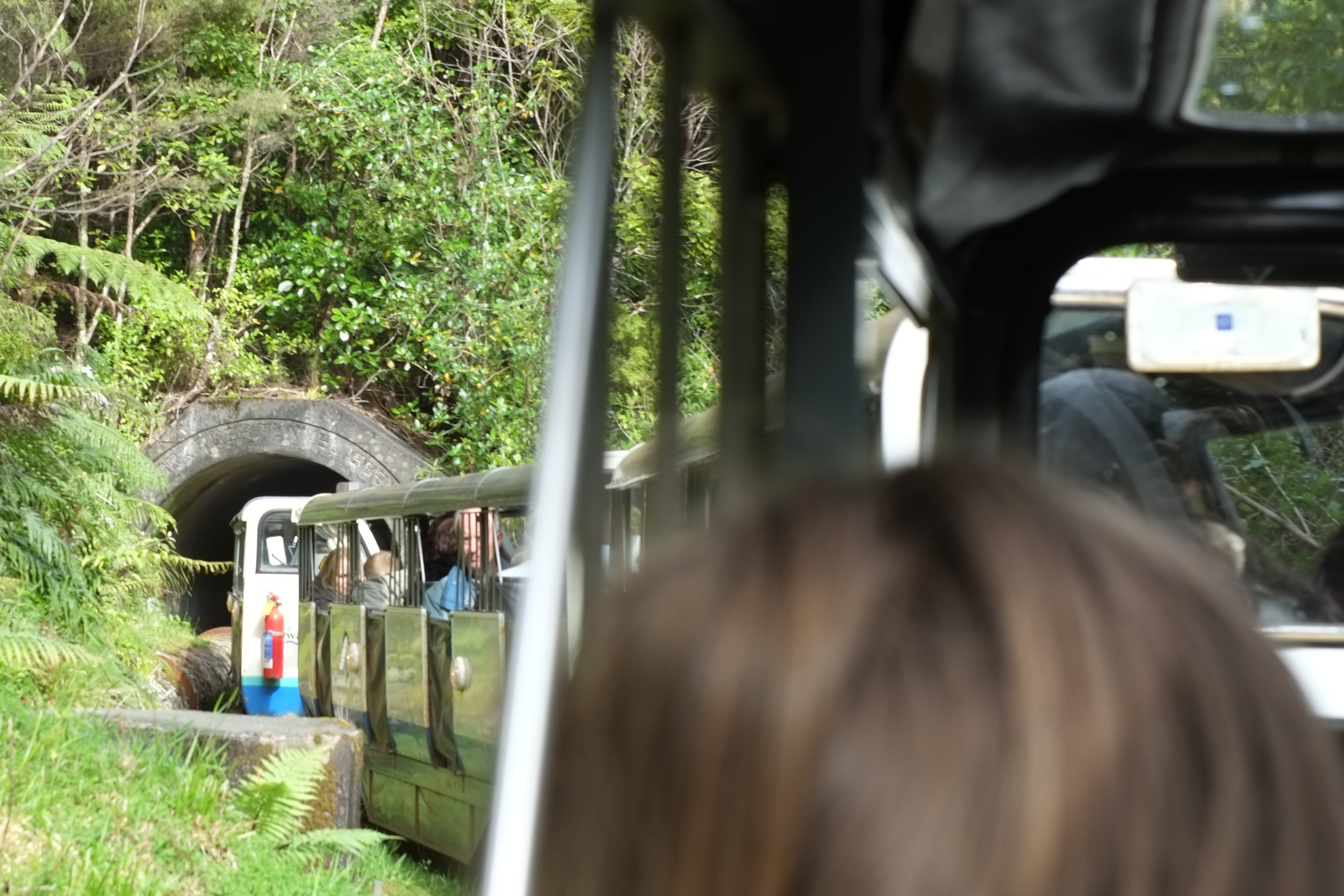
Mouth of the water pipeline tunnel

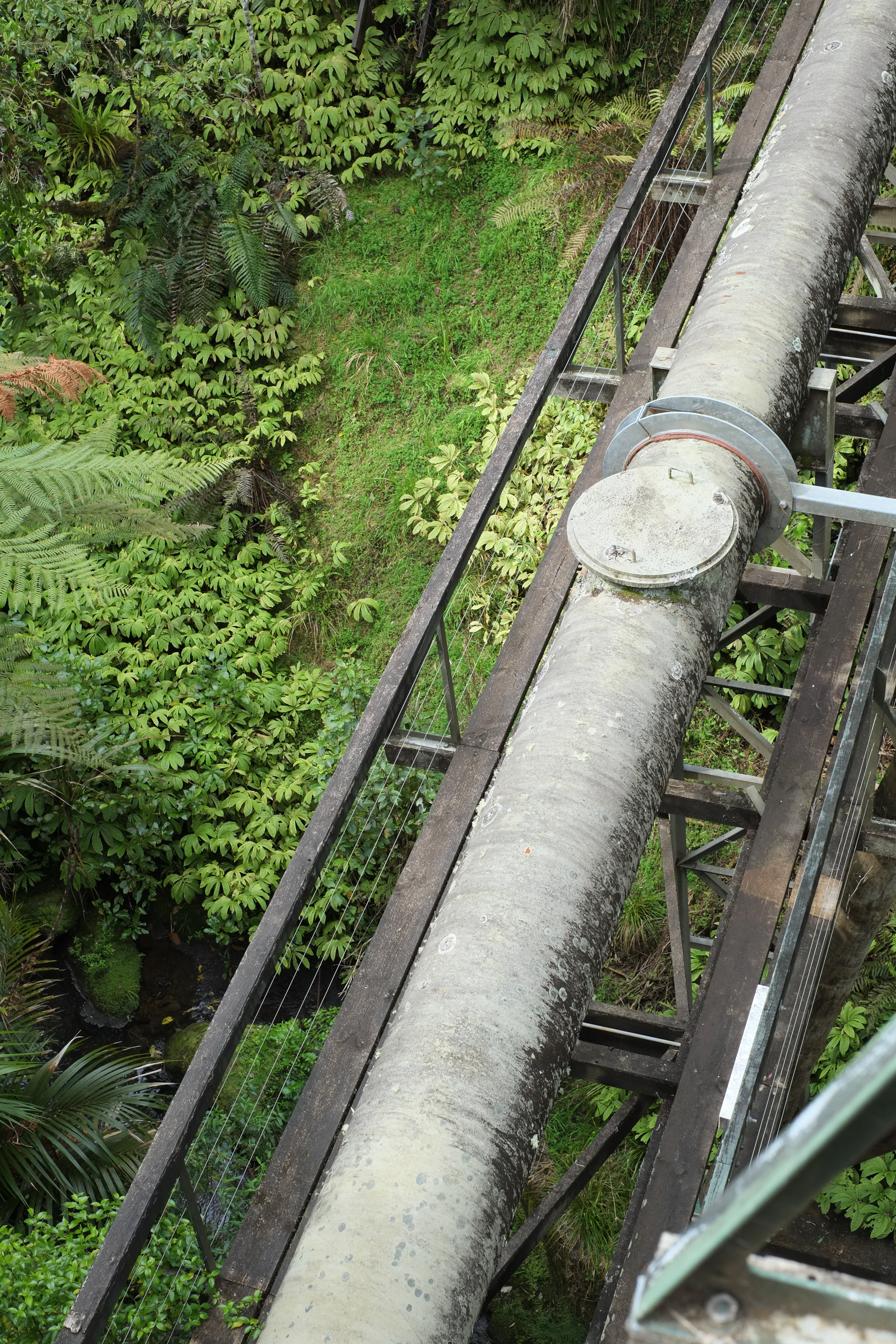
Water pipeline alongside Quinn's Viaduct

== See also ==
- Waitakere Tramline
- Upper Nihotupu Reservoir
- Watercare Services
