= Lower Nihotupu Reservoir =

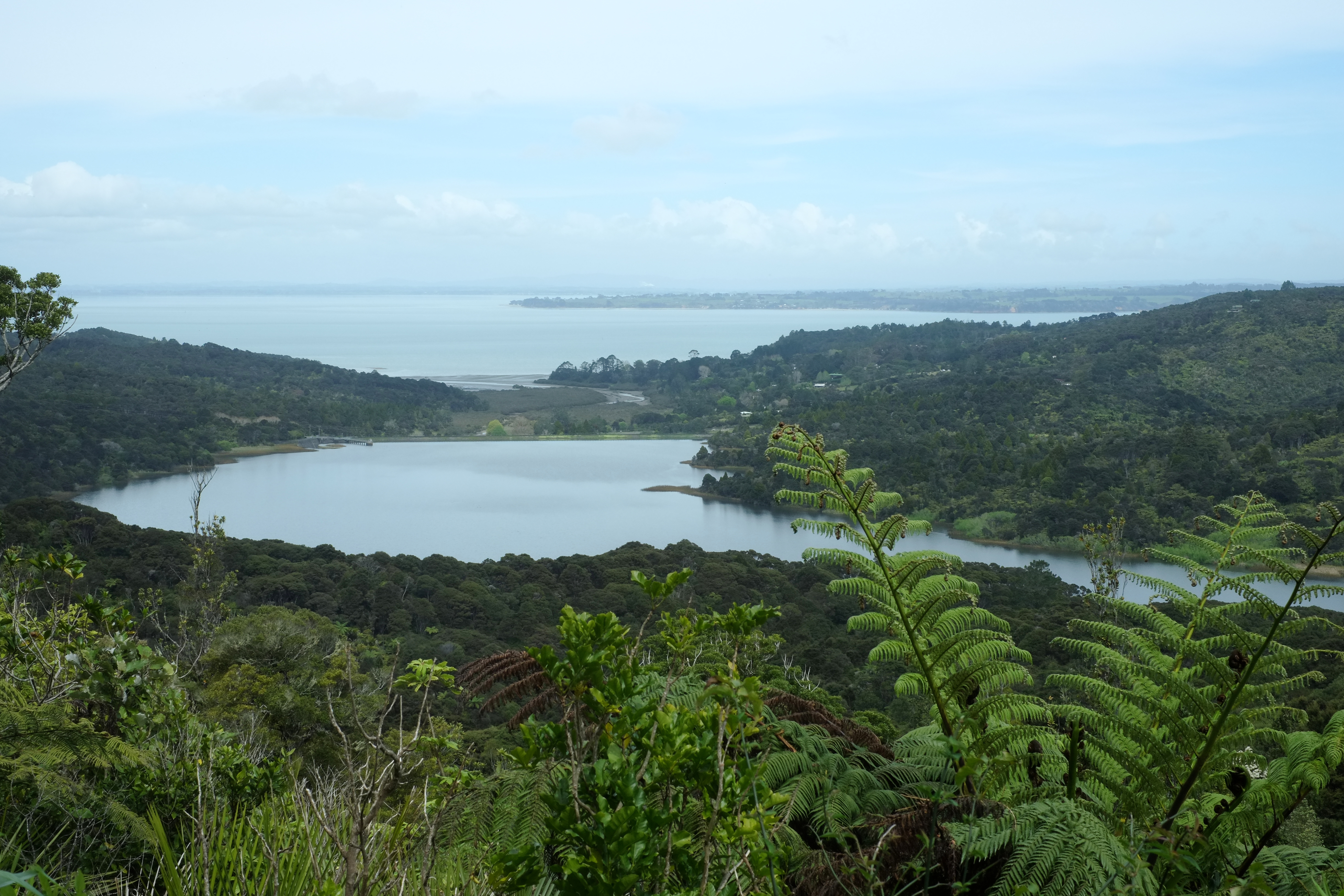
- Looking south, the reservoir from the Rainforest Express bush tram line.

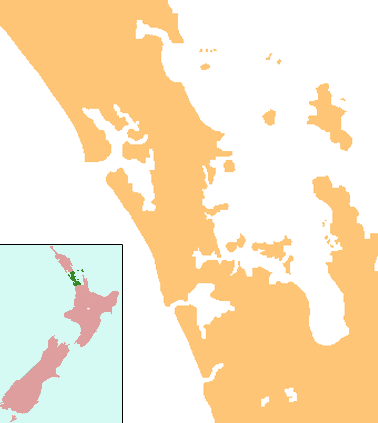
- Location within New Zealand Auckland
- Location: Auckland, North Island
- Coordinates: 36°57′32″S 174°36′48″E
- Type: Reservoir
- Basin countries: New Zealand
- Surface area: 52.9 ha (131 acres)
- Water volume: 4.60×10^{6}–4.81×10^{6} m^{3} (3,730–3,900 acre⋅ft)

The Lower Nihotupu Reservoir (or Lower Nihotupu Dam) is one of five reservoirs in the Waitākere Ranges that supply water to Auckland. Built between 1945 and 1948, the reservoir covers an area of 52.9 hectares and has a capacity of 4.6 million cubic metres. The reservoir is managed by Watercare Services, a council-owned company.

== History ==
The dam is located at Paruroa, near the site of the military base of the Te Taoū hapū (subtribe) of Ngāti Whātua, who were warring with Te Waiohua, the dominant force in Tāmaki Makaurau in the early 18th century. Years of conflict culminated in the early 1740s, when Kiwi Tāmaki, the ariki of Waiohua, was defeated at Paruroa, leading to Ngāti Whātua becoming the main political force on Tāmaki Makaurau. Te-Rangi-hinganga-tahi, the final battle between the two forces, took place around the reservoir and Parau to the south.

Earlier projects such as the Upper Nihotupu Reservoir and the Waitākere Reservoir were completed earlier in the 20th century, after a more consistent water source for Auckland was needed. The Lower Nihotupu project became urgent due to the very dry summer of 1942/3, as well as increased water use by the United States Armed Forces personnel stationed in Auckland during World War II. The dam is credited as one of the first applied examples of the soil mechanics science in New Zealand, and was soon followed by the creating of engineering geology as a major subject at the University of Auckland Faculty of Engineering.

== Recreation and access ==
A walking track called Pipeline Road is found to the north of the reservoir, which includes numerous lookout points where the reservoir can be viewed from.
