= Arataki Visitor Centre =

Visitor centre in West Auckland, New Zealand

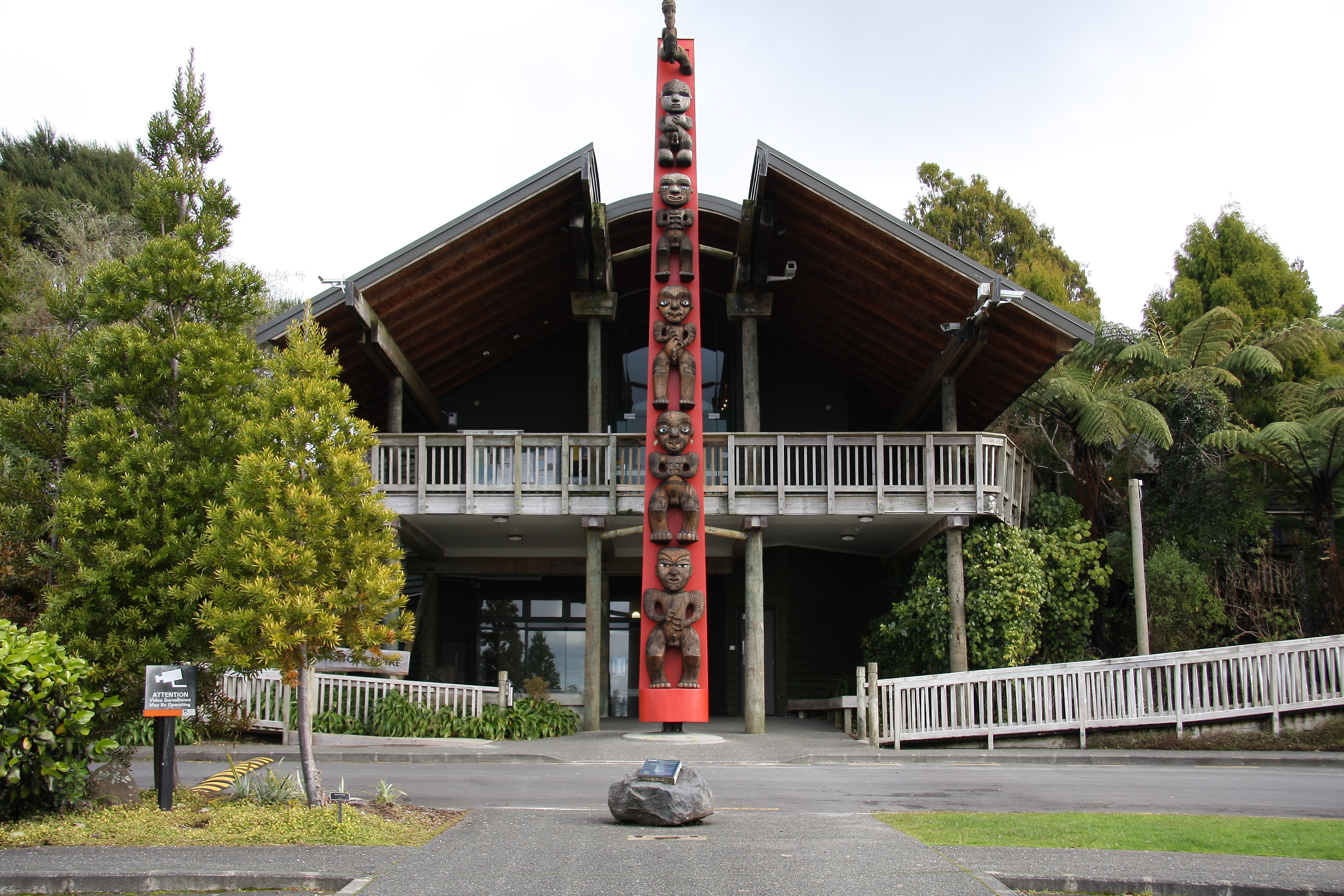
- Interactive map of Arataki Visitor Centre
- Address: 300 Scenic Drive, Oratia, Auckland 0604
- Coordinates: 36.94701°S 174.60646°E

Construction
- Built: 1994

Arataki Visitor Centre is a tourism and education centre in West Auckland, New Zealand, often described as the gateway to the Waitākere Ranges. The centre provides information about the Waitākere Ranges, and organises educational events.

== History ==
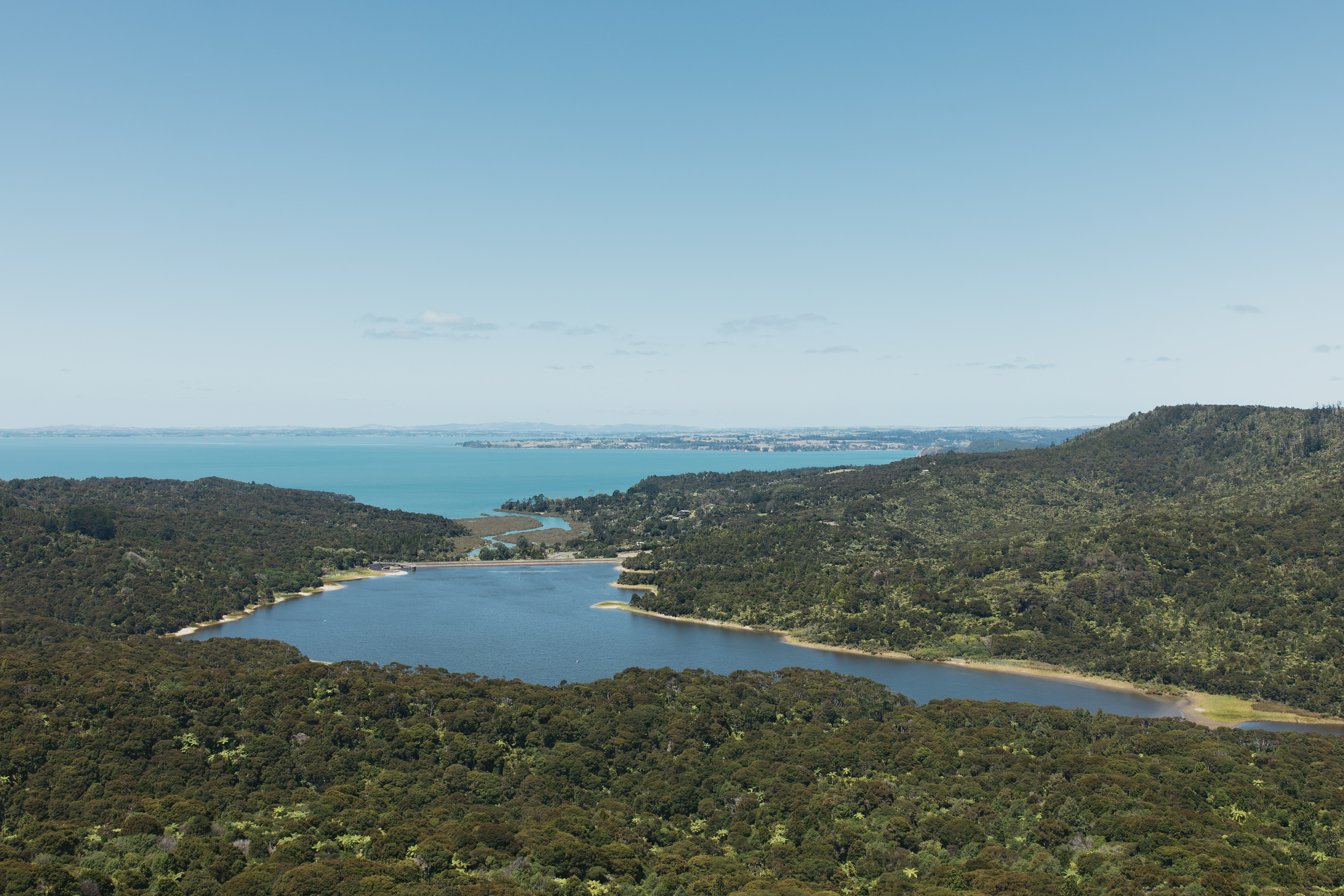
View of the Lower Nihotupu Reservoir and the Manukau Harbour from the Arataki Visitor Centre

The Arataki Nature Trail, located near the site of the visitor centre, was first opened in 1974. The name Arataki is a Māori language word, meaning an "instructional path". The plant identification trail features examples of different species found in the Waitākere Ranges.

The visitor centre was opened in 1994, with a design by Harry Turbott. The carved pou at the entrance of the centre depicts the ancestors of Te Kawerau ā Maki, including Tiriwā (the namesake of the Waitākere Ranges name in Māori, Te Wao Nui a Tiriwa), followed by Rakatāura / Hape (tohunga of the Tainui), Hoturoa, Maki (the namesake ancestor of Te Kawerau ā Maki) and his son and grandson. The pou was removed in 2009 due to damage to the wood, and was replaced with a new pou constructed from fallen kauri from the Waitākere Ranges.

In late 2017, Te Kawerau ā Maki placed a rāhui on the tracks of the Waitākere Ranges, due to the effects of Kauri dieback on the forest, followed by a formal closure of the tracks by Auckland Council in April 2018. The upper Arataki Nature Trail was one of the first tracks to reopen after track upgrades, in May 2018.

== Facility ==
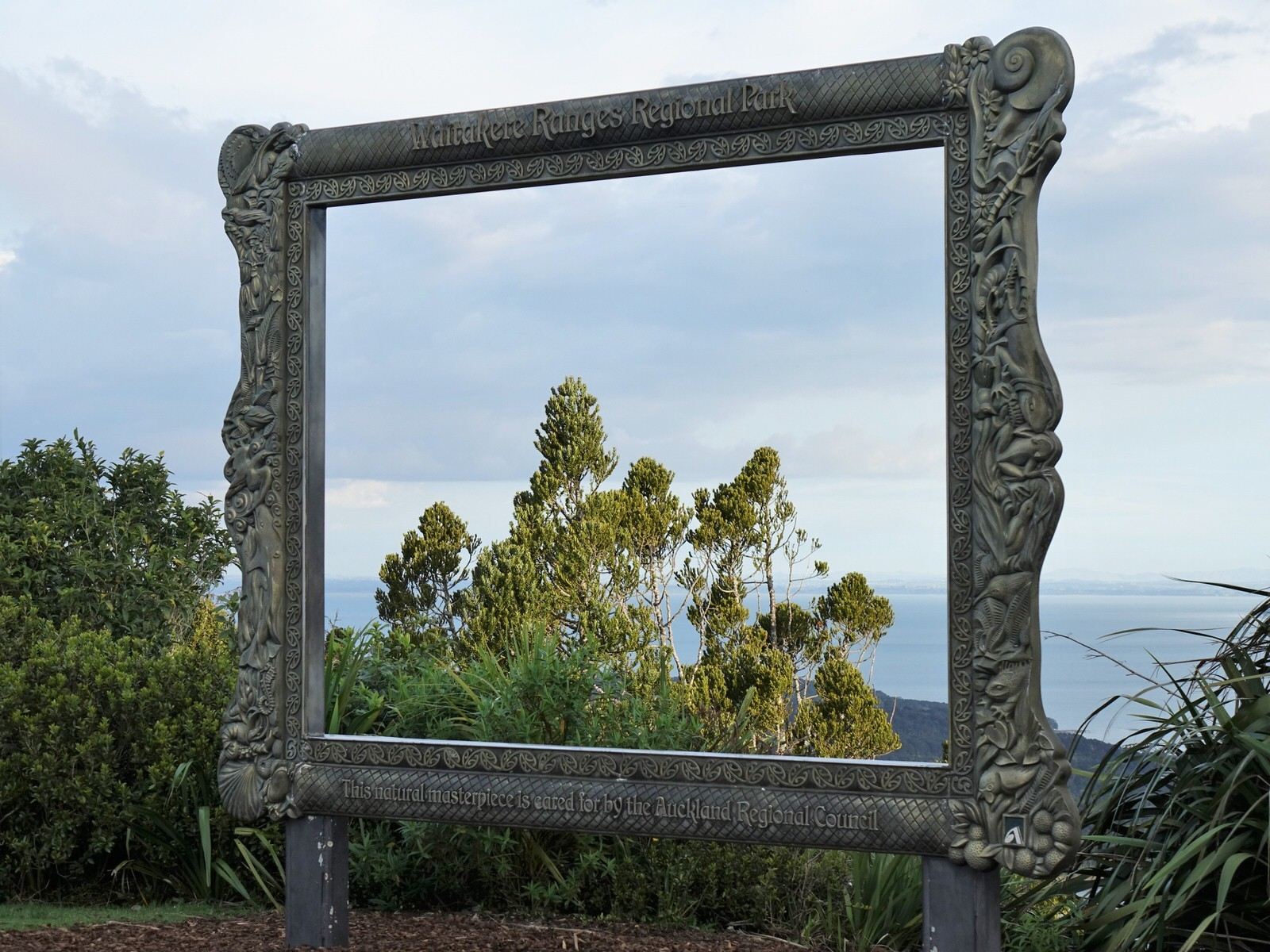
Kauri trees framed by a regional tourism picture frame at the Arataki Visitor Centre

The Arataki Visitor Centre is the start point for the Hillary Trail, a multi-day walk through the Waitākere Ranges to Muriwai which opened in January 2010. As of 2023, the full track remains closed due to the effects of Kauri dieback. The centre is also the starting point for the Rangemore Track, and a five-minute educational nature walk, which explores the different forest biomes found in the Waitākere Ranges.

The visitor centre is also used as a gallery space, including nature photography, and fibre installations by New Zealand weaver Maureen Lander.
