= Upper Nihotupu Reservoir =

Reservoir in Auckland, New Zealand

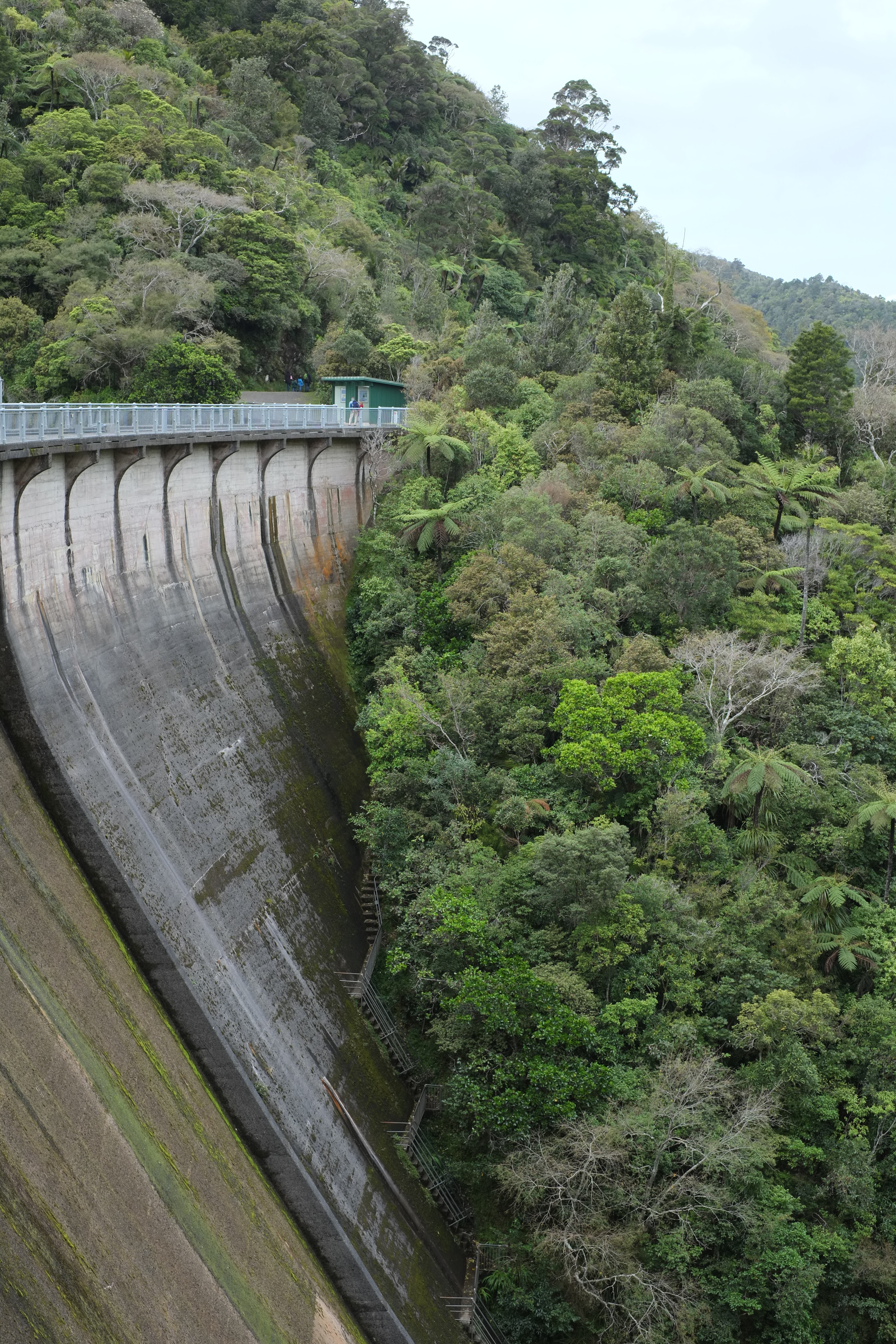
- Upper Nihotupu Dam

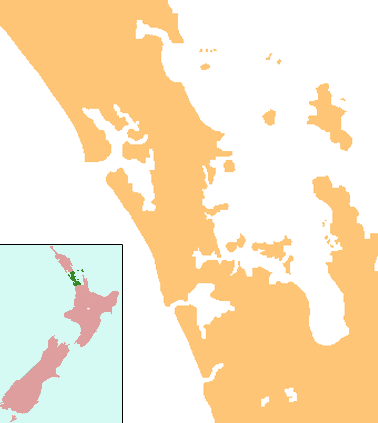
- Location within New Zealand Auckland
- Location: Auckland, North Island
- Coordinates: 36°57′00″S 174°33′50″E
- Type: Reservoir
- Basin countries: New Zealand
- Surface area: 12.5 ha (31 acres)
- Water volume: 2.2×10^{6} m^{3} (1,800 acre⋅ft)

The Upper Nihotupu Reservoir (or Upper Nihotupu Dam) is one of five reservoirs in the Waitākere Ranges that supply water to Auckland, New Zealand. Completed in 1923, the concrete gravity dam and its reservoir are managed by Watercare Services, a council-owned company.

== Construction ==
After the 1898 Auckland droughts, an alternative to the Western Springs pumping station was investigated, with the Waitākere Ranges considered the best option. In 1902, wooden dams were placed at Nihotupu and neighbouring Quinns Creek, which were demolished by 1914.

The dam was tendered in 1915, and a contract awarded to Gisborne firm Langlands and Company. During the construction of a tramline between the construction site and the wharf at Big Muddy Creek, a freak accident occurred during blasting when a stray rock flew 100m into the site office, killing contractor William Langlands. Construction was slow due to high rainfall and flooding in the area, and a lack of labour and resources because of the outbreak of World War I, but the dam was eventually finished in 1923.

== Tourism ==
The Nihotupu area and the picturesque Nihotupu Falls were a tourist attraction in the late 19th century before the dam was built. The dam can be reached by walking track access from Piha Road, with steep steps lead up the face of the dam.

The Nihotupu Tramline built during the construction of the dam was later used for the Watercare-run Rainforest Express tourist attraction. In November 2014, the Nihotupu Tramline and Waitakere Tramline were permanently closed to the public by Watercare after a geological report found 20 "at-risk" sites along the tramline paths.
