= Whites Beach =

Beach in West Auckland, New Zealand

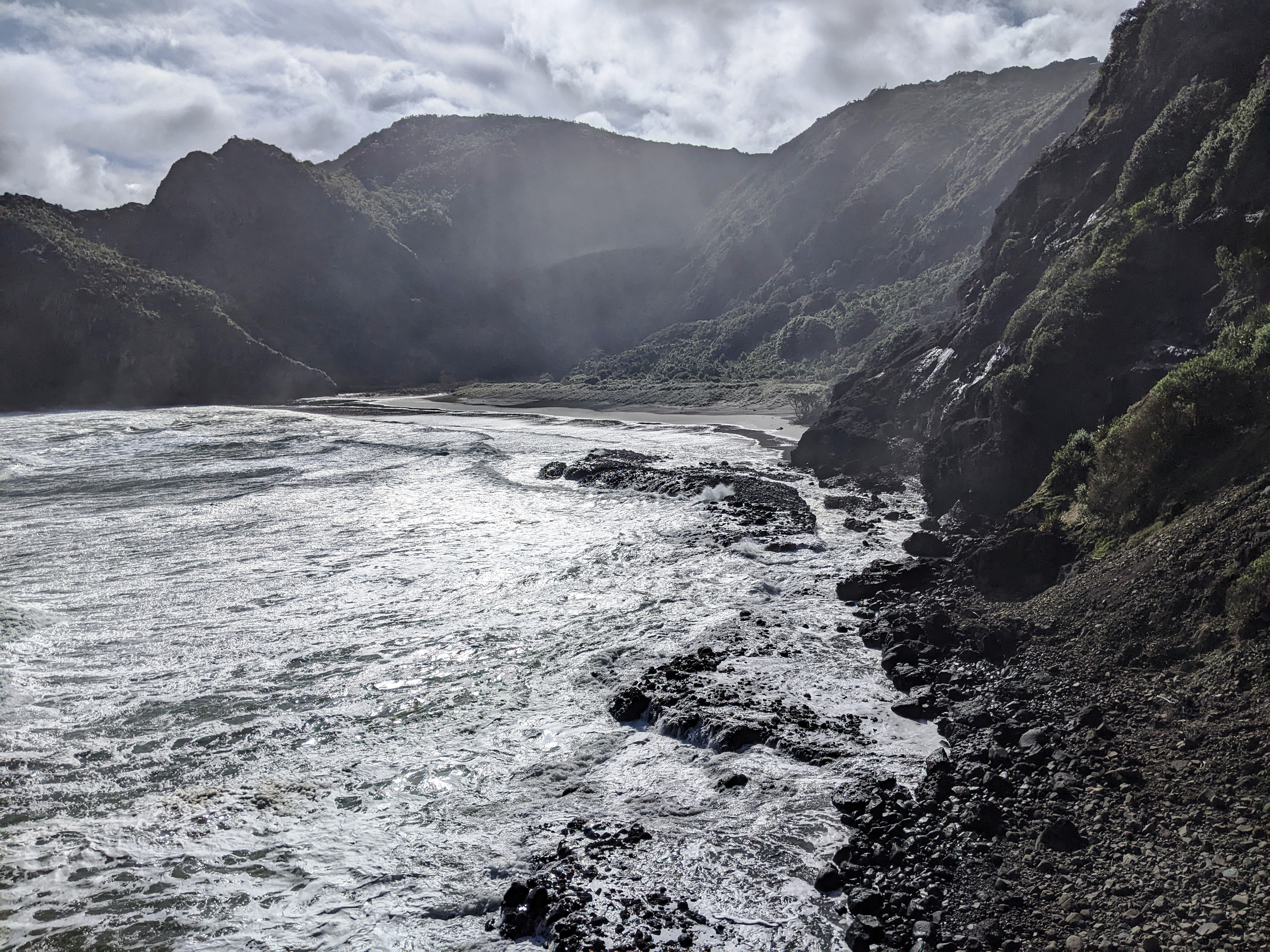
- View of Whites Beach

- Location within the Auckland Region
- Location: Auckland Region, New Zealand
- Coordinates: 36.9304°S 174.4561°E
- Ocean/sea sources: Tasman Sea

Whites Beach is a small beach on the west coast of the Auckland Region of New Zealand's North Island. It is located between Piha and Anawhata.

== Geography ==
Whites Beach is directly north of Piha, between Te Waha Point to the south and Fishermans Rock Point to the north. The beach is only accessible by foot. Whites Bay formed as a part of a volcanic eruption that occurred around 16 million years ago. A subvertical volcanic pipe is exposed on the cliffs to the south of the beach.

== Biodiversity ==
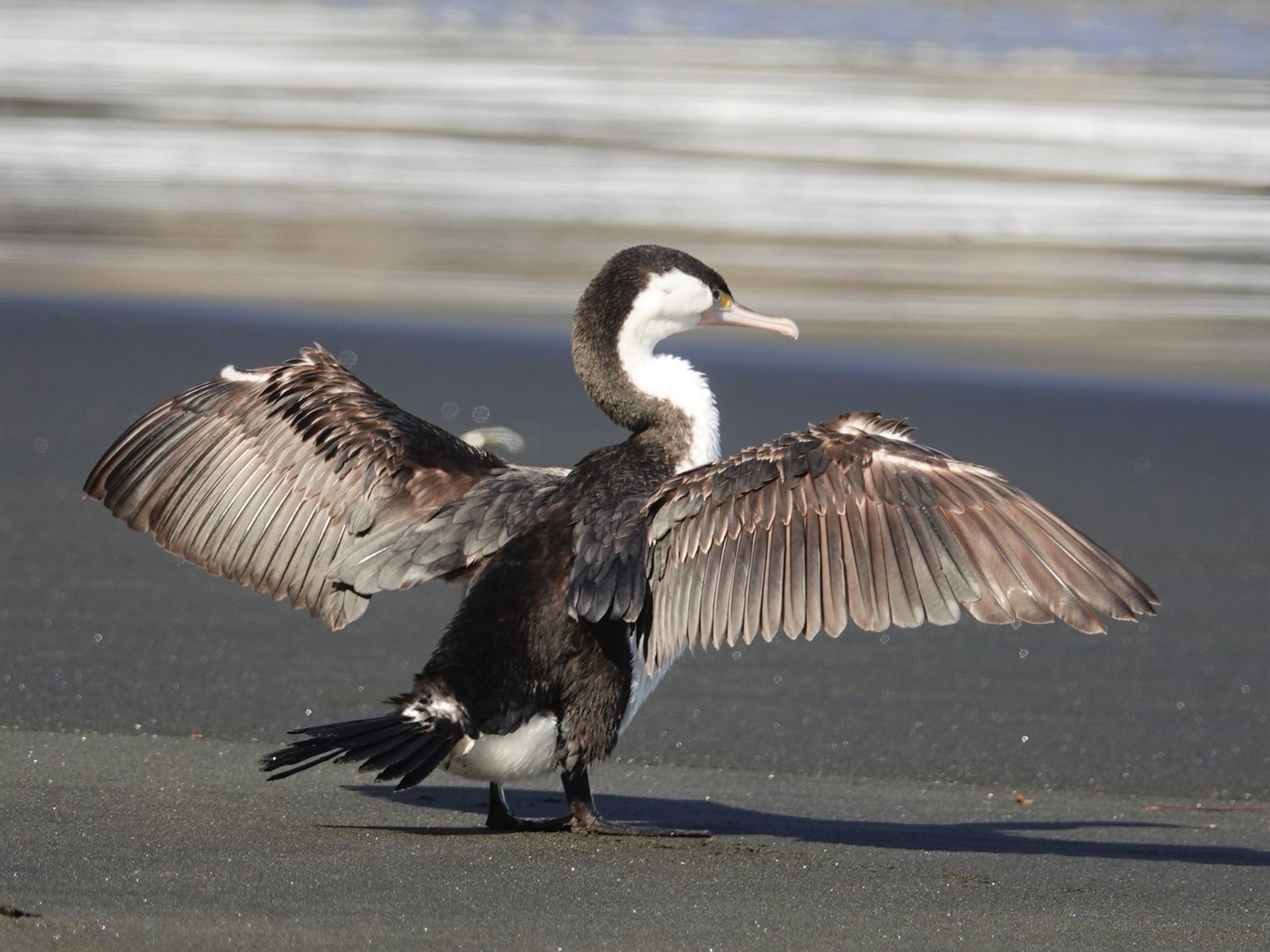
A kāruhiruhi (Australian pied cormorant) at Whites Beach

Much of the flora of the beach ares is dominated by Coprosma, toetoe and marram grass, the latter of which is commonly found in the sand dunes which border the grass.

== History ==
The beach was named after settlers John and Francis White. Francis White was a blacksmith who was an early settler in the area who purchased land from Te Kawerau ā Maki. In 1925, land above the beach was purchased by Jim Rose, who constructed a batch on the cliffs. Sir Edmund Hillary built a bach at Whites Beach.

Prison escapee and folk hero George Wilder spent some months living at Whites Beach in early 1963 after escaping from Mount Eden Prison.

== Accessibility ==
Whites Beach is accessible by the Rose Track, a walking track between the beach and Anawhata Road. Additionally, the Laird Thompson Track connects Whites Beach to Piha in the south.
