= Te Unuhanga-a-Rangitoto / Mercer Bay =

Bay in New Zealand

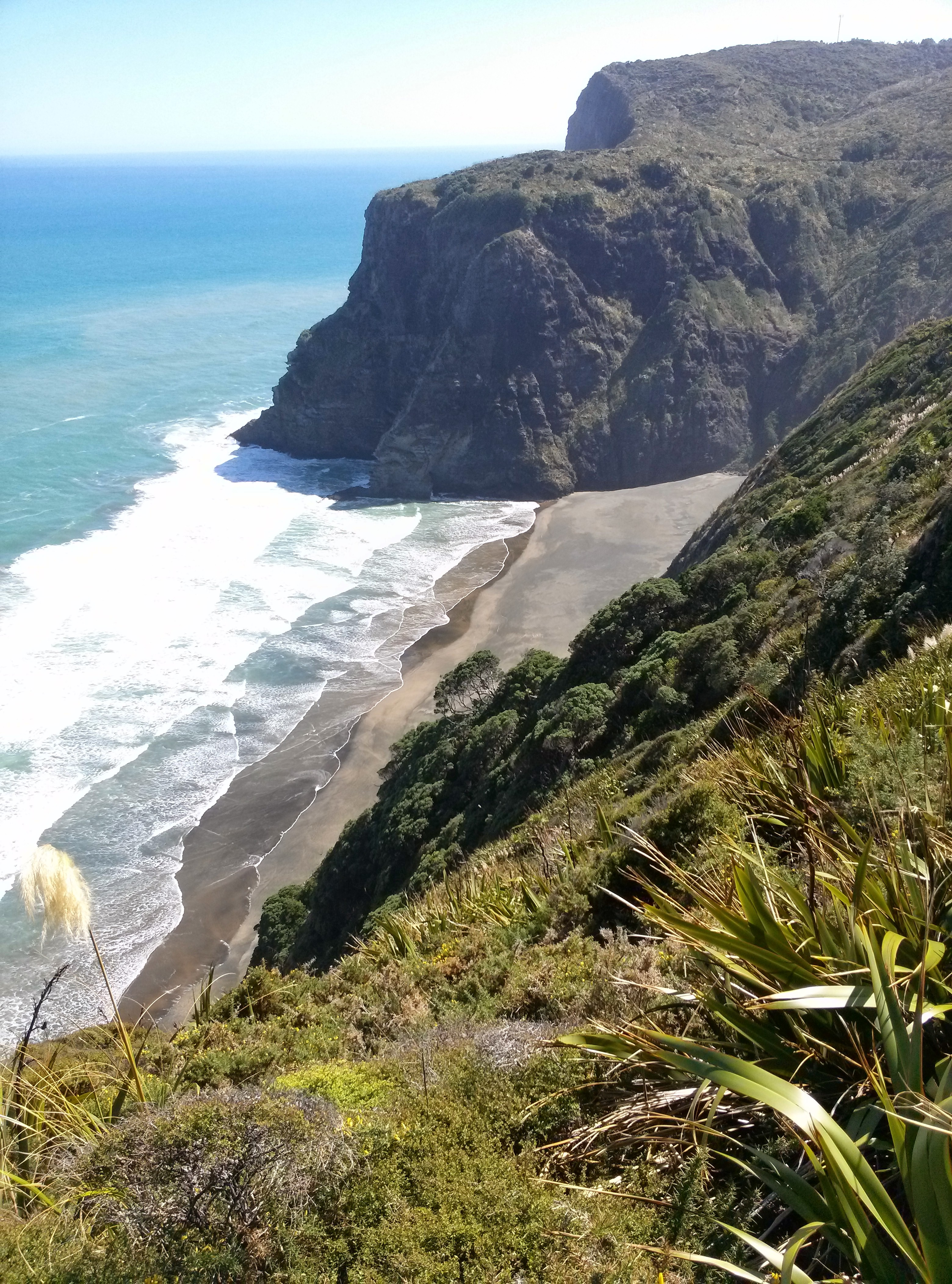
- View of Te Unuhanga-a-Rangitoto / Mercer Bay from the Mercer Bay Loop track

- Location within the Auckland Region
- Location: Auckland Region, New Zealand
- Coordinates: 36.979°S 174.468°E
- Ocean/sea sources: Tasman Sea

Te Unuhanga-a-Rangitoto / Mercer Bay is a bay on the Auckland Region of New Zealand's North Island. It is located south of Piha and north of Karekare. The bay is surrounded by 60 m (200 ft)-high cliffs, which are the tallest in the Auckland Region.

== Description ==
Te Unuhanga-a-Rangitoto / Mercer Bay is on the west coast of the Auckland Region, between Te Ahua Point and Farley Point, north-west of Karekare. The bay has the tallest cliffs found in the Auckland Region, which are over 60 metres (200 ft) high.

The beach disappears entirely at high tide. The northern end of the beach is the location of Te Ana Areare, caves traditionally used as a refuge by Te Kawerau ā Maki, and a shag colony is found at the southern end of the beach.

== History ==
The bay is within the traditional rohe of the Te Kawerau ā Maki iwi. Te Unuhanga-a-Rangitoto ("Place from Where Rangitoto Was Drawn") refers to a traditional story involving the ancient supernatural ancestor Tiriwa, who lifts Rangitoto Island from its location on the Tasman Sea to the Hauraki Gulf, as a show of his power to other Tūrehu. Another traditional story involving the area is Te Ahua o Hinerangi, the story of Hinerangi who fell to her death at Te Ahua Point.

After the land was acquired by the Crown, it was granted to a settler named Andrew Mercer, who became the namesake of the bay's English language name.

The Māori language name for the bay was officially added in November 2015 by the New Zealand Geographic Board under the terms of Te Kawerau ā Maki Claims Settlement Act 2015.

The Mercer Bay Loop Track is a popular walking track along the cliffs above the bay. After kauri dieback led to the closure of many Waitākere Ranges tracks, the Mercer Bay Loop Track grew significantly in popularity. Numerous deaths and disappearances have been linked to the bay.
