= Piha =

Locality in the Auckland Region, New Zealand

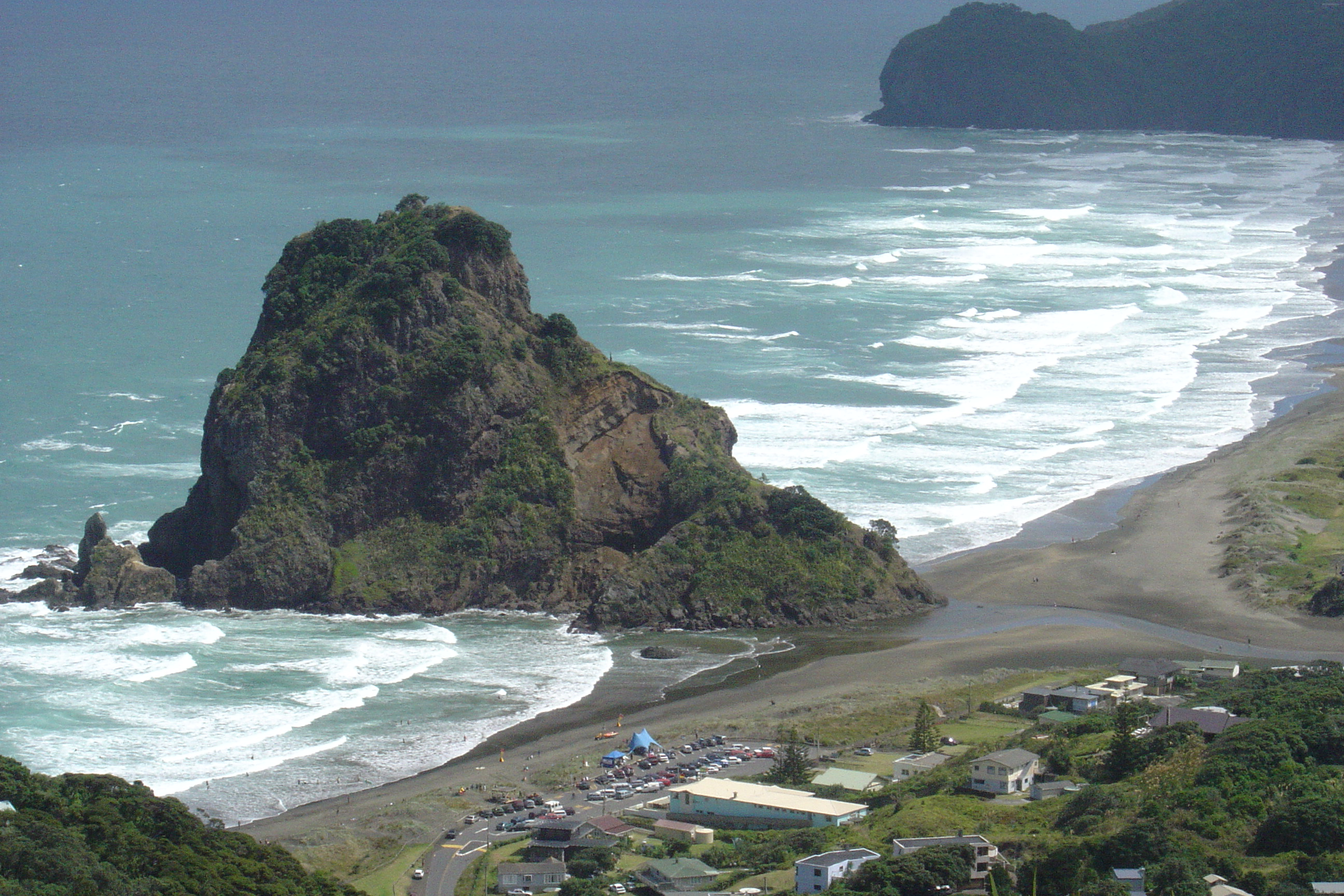
- Piha and Lion Rock from the access road above
- Interactive map of Piha
- Coordinates: 36.954°S 174.471°E
- Country: New Zealand
- Region: Auckland
- Ward: Waitākere ward
- Local board: Waitākere Ranges Local Board
- Electorates: Waitākere; Tāmaki Makaurau

Government
  - Territorial Authority: Auckland Council
  - Mayor of Auckland: Wayne Brown
  - Waitākere MP: Vanushi Walters
  - Tāmaki Makaurau MP: Oriini Kaipara

Area
  - Total: 5.24 km^{2} (2.02 sq mi)

Population (June 2025)
  - Total: 1,030
  - Density: 197/km^{2} (509/sq mi)

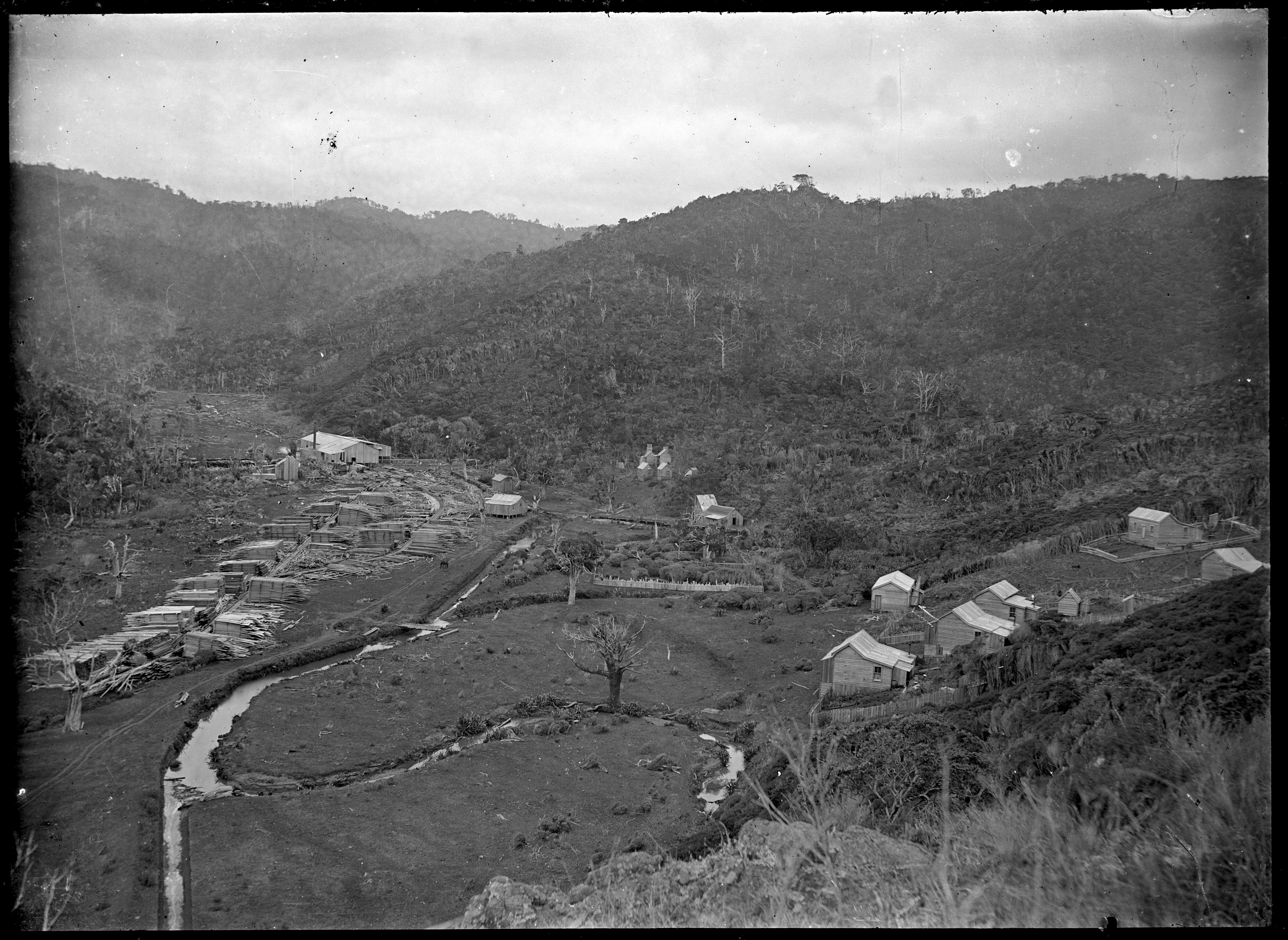
Timber settlement at Piha circa 1916, photograph by Albert Percy Godber

Piha is a coastal settlement in West Auckland, on the western coast of the Auckland Region in New Zealand. It is one of the most popular beaches in the area and a major day-trip destination for Aucklanders throughout the year, and especially in summer.

Piha is 39 kilometres west of Auckland city centre, on the Tasman Sea coast to the north of the Manukau Harbour, on the western edge of the Waitākere Ranges. Immediately to the north of Piha is Whites Beach, and immediately to the south is Te Unuhanga-a-Rangitoto / Mercer Bay; land access to both is only by foot. The nearest beaches accessible by road are Karekare to the south, and Anawhata to the north.

== History ==
The area is traditionally a part of rohe of the Tāmaki Māori tribe Te Kawerau ā Maki. The area is named for Te Piha, the traditional name of Lion Rock which was later applied to the wider area, and refers to the pattern made when waves hit against the rock. The area was the location of many pā and villages, including a headland at Te Waha Point north of the beach, where many karaka trees associated with the former pā grow, and Lion Rock, which was the location of Whakaari pā. Archaeological surveys have shown the remains of platforms, midden and terraces on Lion Rock, as well as fragments of traditional textiles, dating back to a time before European contact. The earthworks of Whakaari pā are not well preserved due to erosion.

Te Unuhanga-a-Rangitoto / Mercer Bay to the south was traditionally known by the name Te Unuhanga o Rangitoto, referencing the traditional story of Te Kawerau ā Maki of early ancestor Tiriwa, who formed the bay by moving Rangitoto Island from the West coast to the Hauraki Gulf / Tīkapa Moana. The English language name references Andrew Mercer, an Auckland settler who received Crown grant in June 1866.

At the turn of the 20th century, holidaymakers would travel by coach from Glen Eden to stay at guest houses in Piha. In February 1939, two Australian visitors to Auckland, G R Mackey and J A Talbot, committed arson at a Piha bach. The fire was lit as a part of an insurance scam, and a body of a recently buried soldier was taken from Waikumete Cemetery and placed inside the bach.

Albert Percy Godber took photographs in the area in the 1910s.

Since 1992, six people have disappeared from or in the area of Piha with no trace, with one of the more publicised cases being Iraena Asher and the most recent being French teenager Eloi Rolland in 2020. No trace has been left by any of these people, and none of them have been found.

Piha suffered floods and slips from Cyclone Gabrielle in early 2023, and the main road out was closed to non-residents until May 2023.

== Demographics ==
Piha is described by Statistics New Zealand as a rural settlement, and covers 5.24 km^{2} (2.02 sq mi) and had an estimated population of 1,030 as of June 2025, with a population density of 197 people per km^{2}.

Historical population
Year	Pop.	±% p.a.
2006	822	—
2013	858	+0.61%
2018	984	+2.78%
2023	1,044	+1.19%

Piha had a population of 1,044 in the 2023 New Zealand census, an increase of 60 people (6.1%) since the 2018 census, and an increase of 186 people (21.7%) since the 2013 census. There were 519 males, 519 females and 3 people of other genders in 411 dwellings. 4.0% of people identified as LGBTIQ+. The median age was 46.2 years (compared with 38.1 years nationally). There were 162 people (15.5%) aged under 15 years, 162 (15.5%) aged 15 to 29, 531 (50.9%) aged 30 to 64, and 192 (18.4%) aged 65 or older.

People could identify as more than one ethnicity. The results were 92.8% European (Pākehā); 17.8% Māori; 2.9% Pasifika; 3.2% Asian; 1.1% Middle Eastern, Latin American and African New Zealanders (MELAA); and 2.3% other, which includes people giving their ethnicity as "New Zealander". English was spoken by 98.6%, Māori language by 3.7%, Samoan by 0.3%, and other languages by 10.1%. No language could be spoken by 1.4% (e.g. too young to talk). New Zealand Sign Language was known by 0.6%. The percentage of people born overseas was 19.5, compared with 28.8% nationally.

Religious affiliations were 16.4% Christian, 0.3% Islam, 0.3% Māori religious beliefs, 1.1% Buddhist, 1.1% New Age, 0.3% Jewish, and 2.3% other religions. People who answered that they had no religion were 71.3%, and 7.5% of people did not answer the census question.

Of those at least 15 years old, 324 (36.7%) people had a bachelor's or higher degree, 450 (51.0%) had a post-high school certificate or diploma, and 111 (12.6%) people exclusively held high school qualifications. The median income was $45,700, compared with $41,500 nationally. 168 people (19.0%) earned over $100,000 compared to 12.1% nationally. The employment status of those at least 15 was that 402 (45.6%) people were employed full-time, 153 (17.3%) were part-time, and 33 (3.7%) were unemployed.

== Features and geology ==
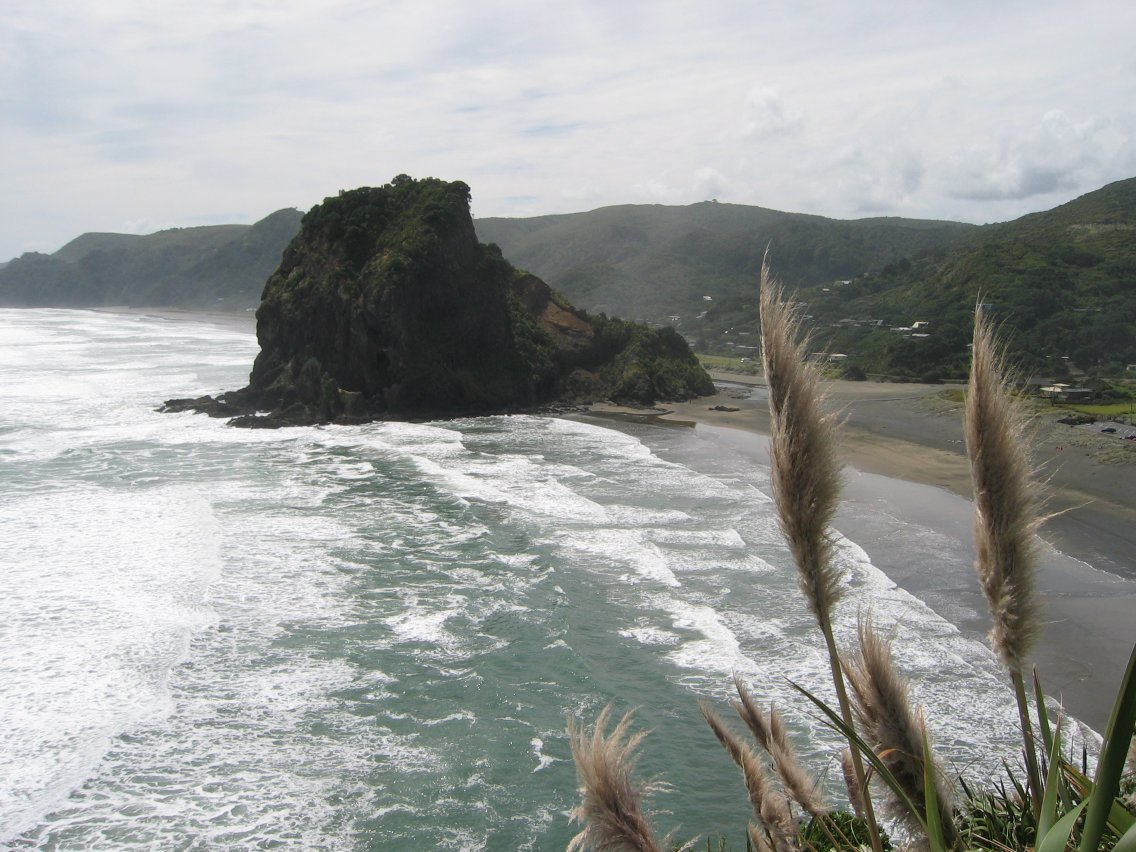
Looking north over South Piha beach to Lion Rock. North Piha beach is visible beyond.

As well as two surf beaches there are also a sheltered lagoon and several streams in the area. The coastline and forested Waitākere Ranges offer a number of walks, or tramps, ranging from easy to very difficult. Due to the spread of the incurable kauri dieback disease large parts of the Waitākere Ranges were closed from 2018 until further notice.

Piha is a well known black sand beach, due to the high iron content, which originated from Mount Taranaki and earlier volcanoes in the area.

Lion Rock is a natural formation dividing North and South Piha beaches. It is an eroded 16-million-year-old volcanic neck, named for its similarity to a lying male lion when viewed from the rear (shore side), Lion Rock is immediately visible to visitors as they descend along the only access road. Lion Rock has become iconic not only of Piha, but of Auckland's West Coast in general. Lion Rock was featured on stamps as well as an Auckland phone book, and in December 1919 a memorial to local sawmillers who served in World War One was unveiled on Lion Rock.

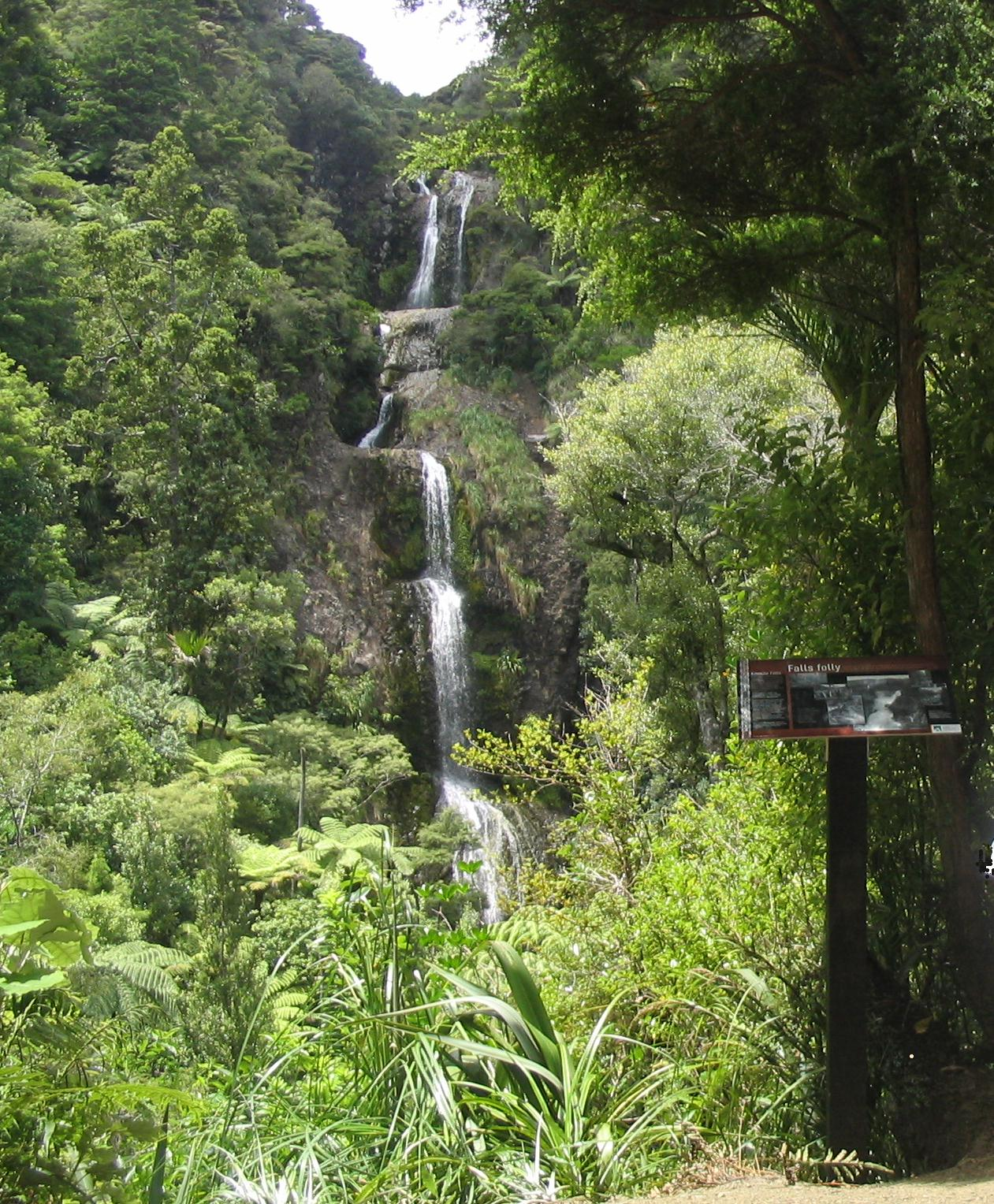
Kitekite Falls

About 2 km inland, on the Glen Esk stream, are the Kitekite Falls which while not very large are picturesque. Swimming is possible all seasons (though only for the cold hardened outside of summer) in a pool just above the falls. At the bottom of the falls is a sheltered picnic area popular with families in the summer time. There is another pool between the top falls and the bottom falls, but is closed due to Kauri dieback.

About 2 km inland, on the Piha Stream, is a small canyon.

About 1 km south of the South Beach is 'The Gap', which at low tide provides another lagoon and a blowhole.

== Surfing ==
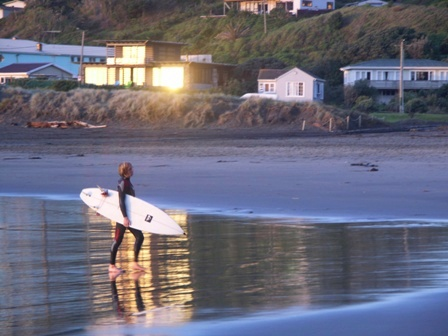
A surfer leaving the water

Piha was the birthplace of New Zealand board riding in 1958, and has been the scene of both New Zealand national and international surfing championship competitions.

== Surf lifesaving ==
Two surf lifesaving clubs provide surf patrols in summer. Piha Surf Life Saving Club, the home of the TV series Piha Rescue, patrols the section of the beach to the south of Lion Rock. United North Piha Lifeguard Service is responsible for the section of the beach north of Lion Rock. Both clubs provide patrolled areas designated by red and yellow flags as is the custom with Surf Lifesaving in New Zealand and many other countries.

== Safety information ==
The rip currents along this section of coast are very unpredictable and can shift with little warning. They claim many lives despite the efforts of surf life-savers. Most of these drownings, however, occur after lifeguards are off duty or after rock fisherman wearing heavy clothing are washed off rocks, out of sight of the lifeguards. Lifeguards advise swimming between the red and yellow flags, during patrol hours.

After the death of two men at Piha in February 2013, lifeguards say the water fools swimmers by appearing deceptively calm, obscuring strong rips, and people should stay out of the water if they are not confident swimmers.

== Piha Rescue ==
Piha Beach was the setting for a popular New Zealand reality television show. Aptly named Piha Rescue, it ran for 12 series over 14 years on TV1 and it featured the lives of the surf life savers at Piha Beach and educated the public on the beach safety, rip currents and swimming between the flags.

== Photo gallery ==
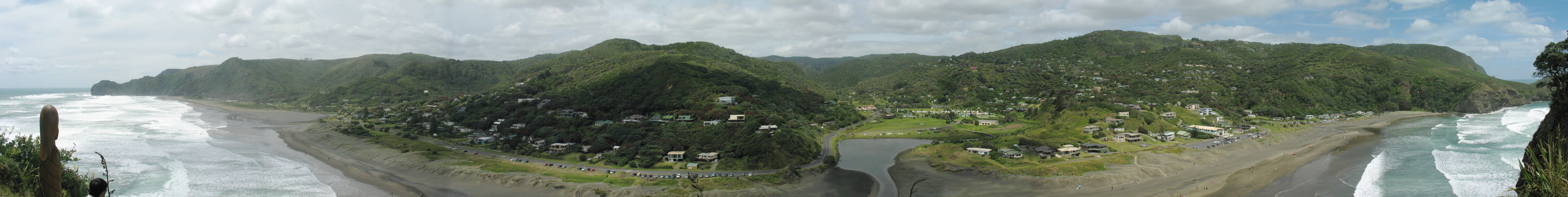
The view from Lion Rock.

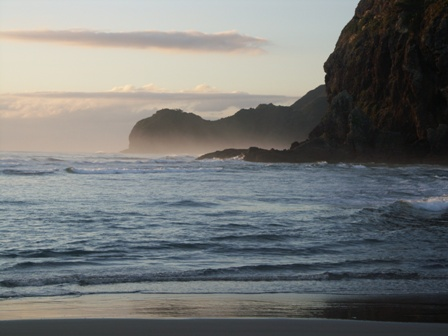
North to Lion rock and Te Waha Point

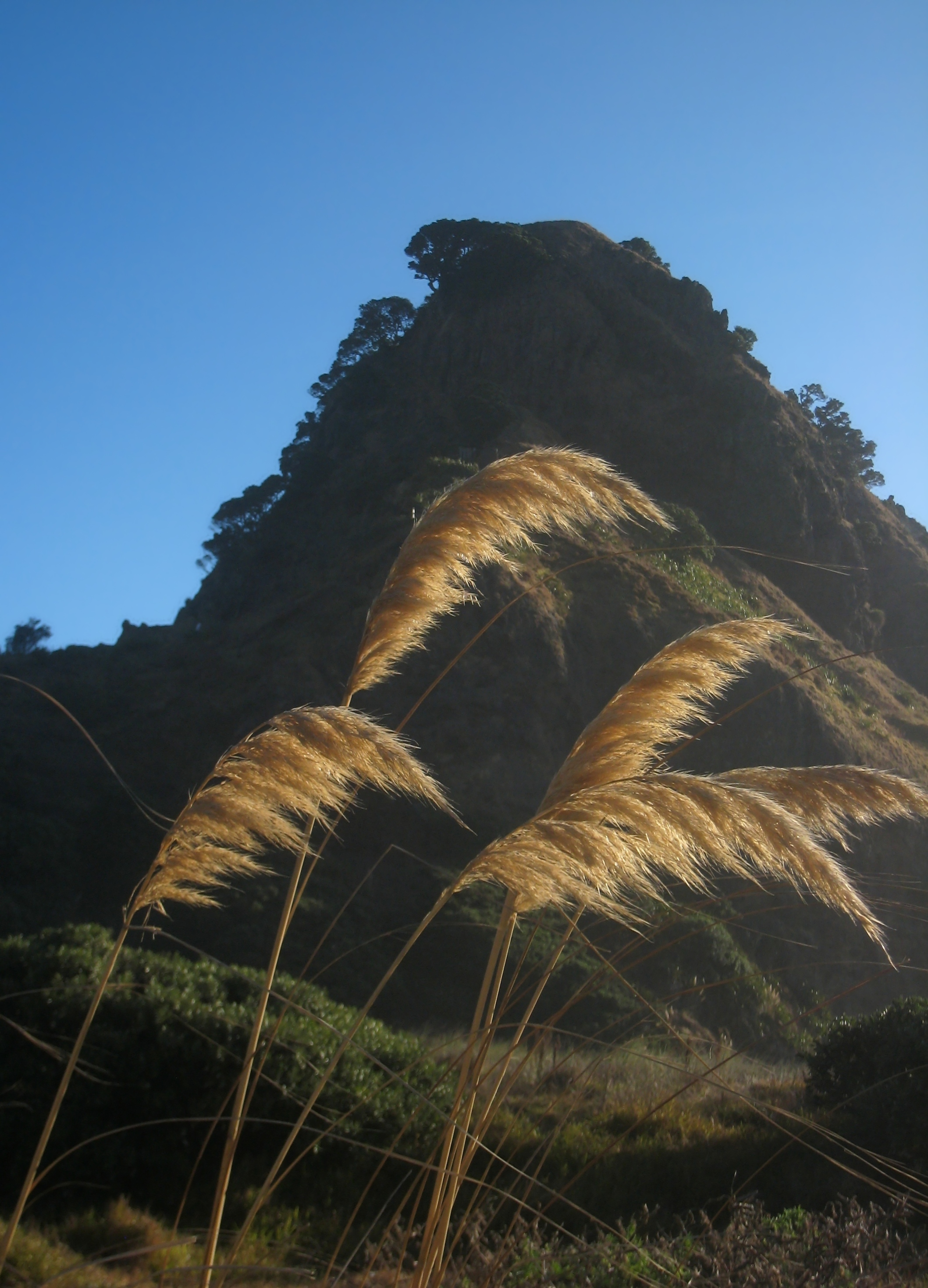
Toetoe plumes and Lion Rock

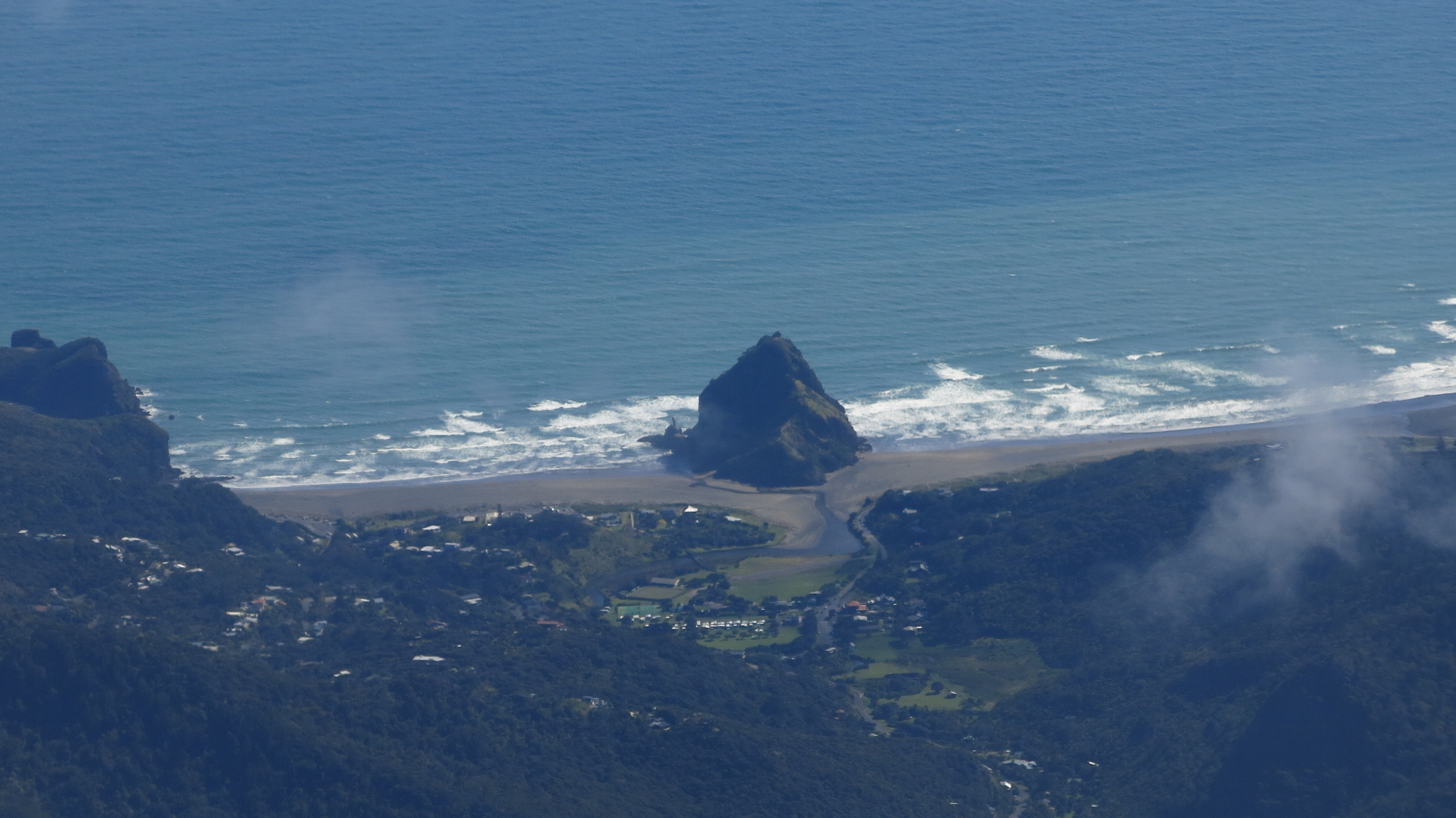
Aerial view of Piha Beach and Lion Rock

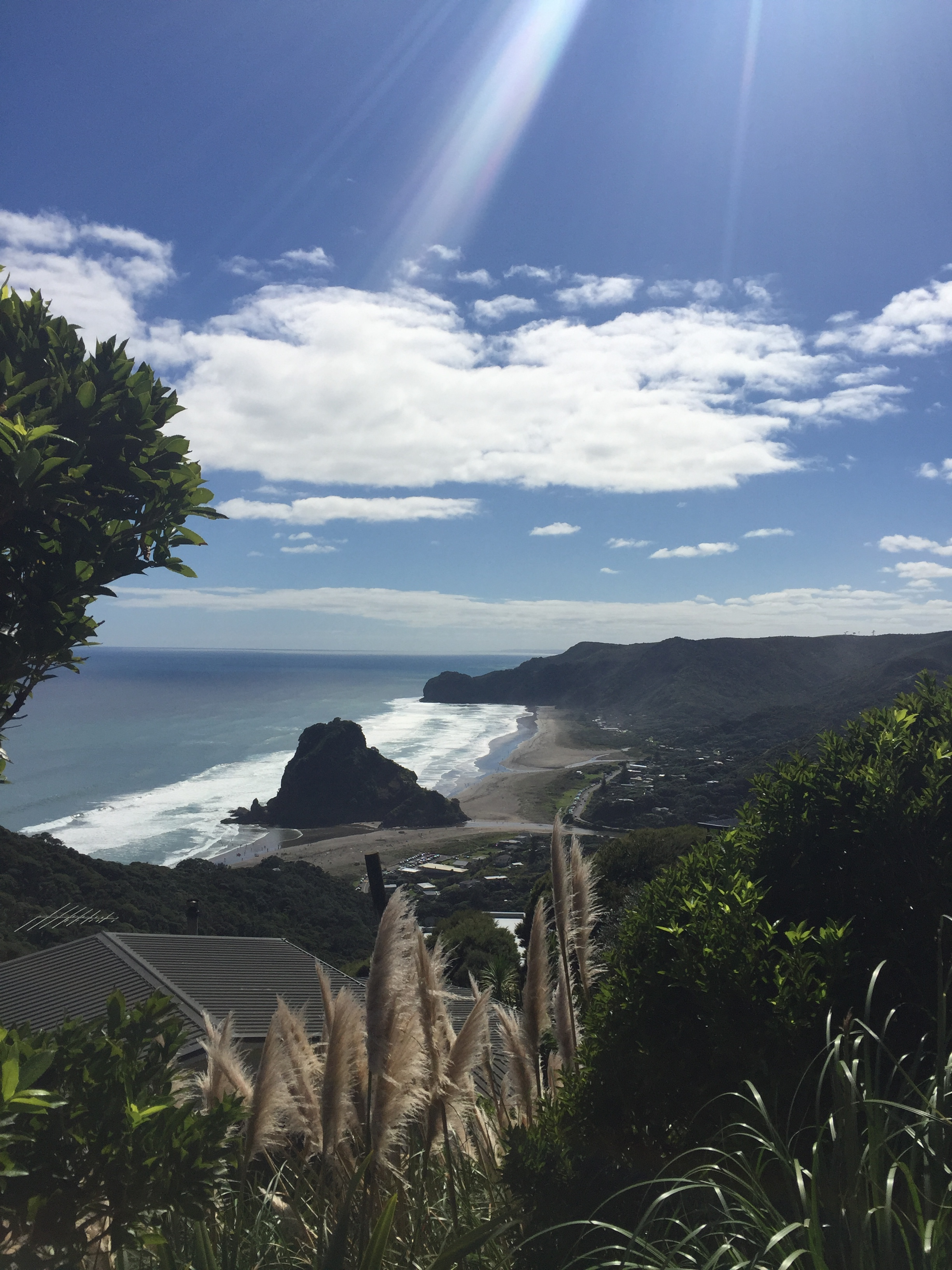
A view over Piha beach

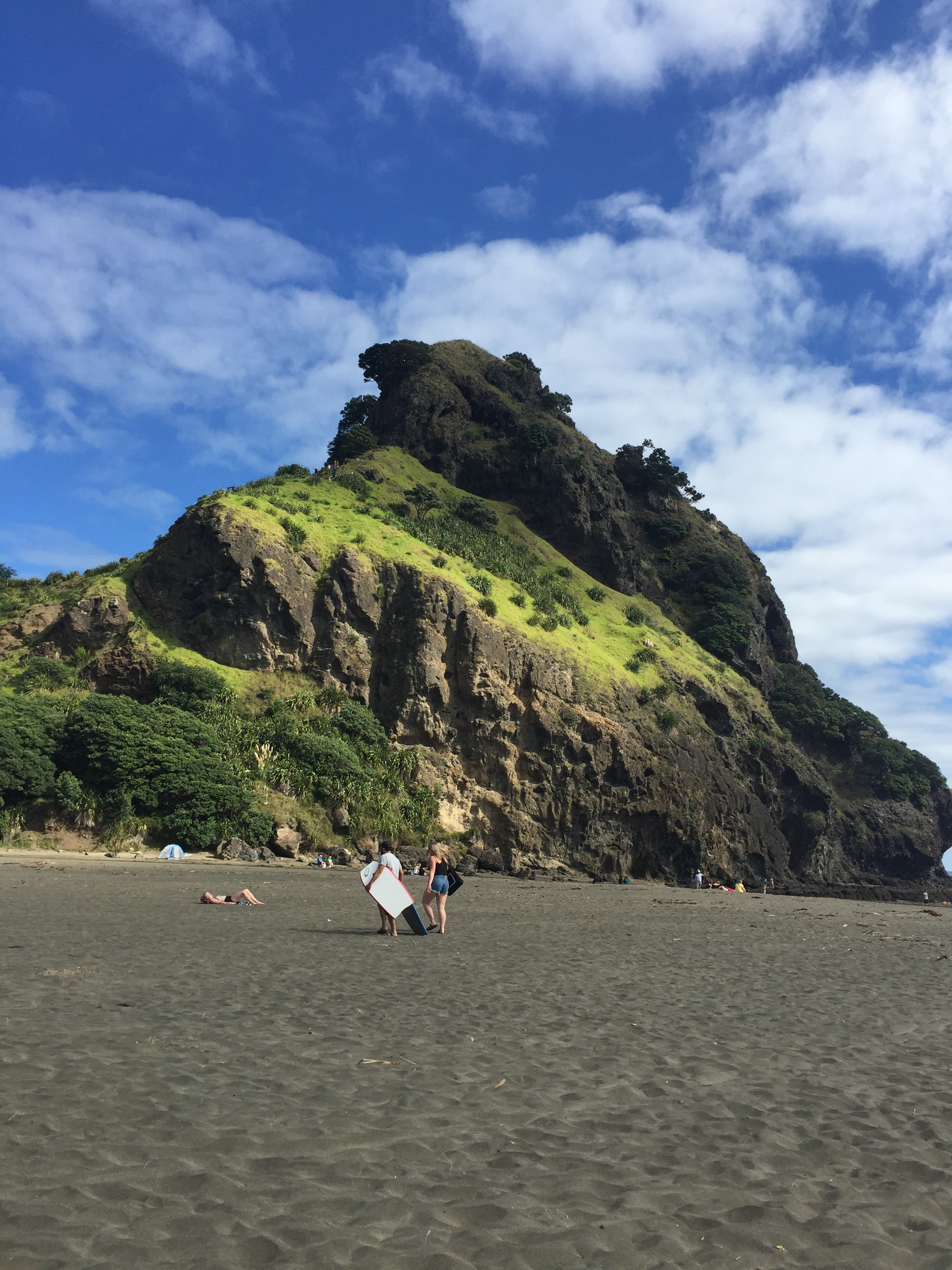
A view of Lion Rock from the beach

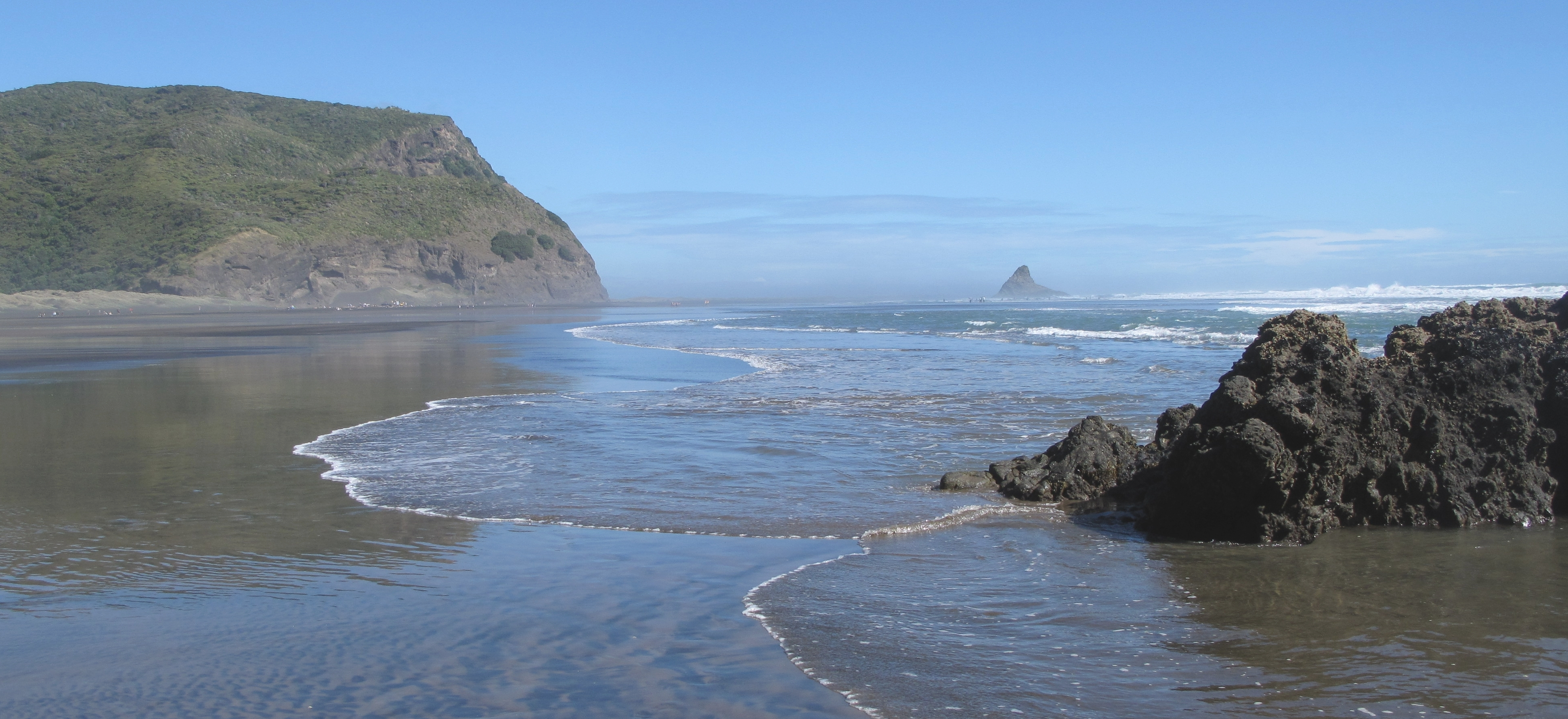
Piha Beach and Lion Rock
