= Lion Rock (New Zealand) =

Rocky Headland on Piha Beach, Auckland, New Zealand

Te Piha (Māori)
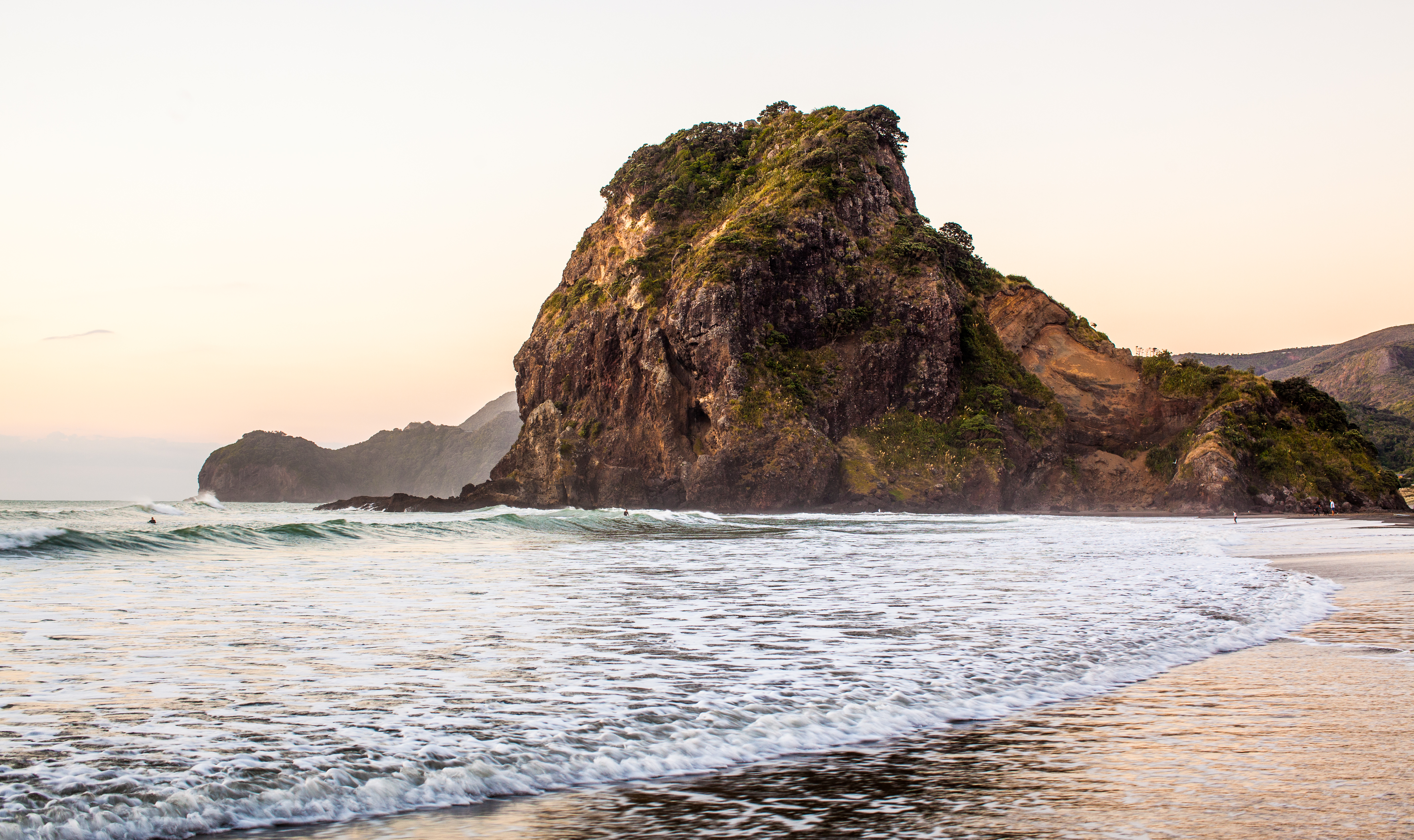
- Interactive map of Lion Rock

Geography
- Location: Auckland, New Zealand
- Coordinates: 36°57′13″S 174°27′58″E
- Adjacent to: Tasman Sea
- Highest elevation: 52 m (171 ft)

Administration
- New Zealand

Lion Rock is a rocky headland located on Piha Beach on the western coast of the Auckland Region in New Zealand. It is an eroded 16-million-year-old volcanic neck, named for its similarity to a lying male lion when viewed from the rear (shore side). Lion Rock is immediately visible to visitors as they descend along the only access road.

== Geography ==
The rock is located to the south of Piha beach, close to the major settlement at Piha. The Piha Stream flows into the Tasman Sea directly south of the rock.

== Geology ==
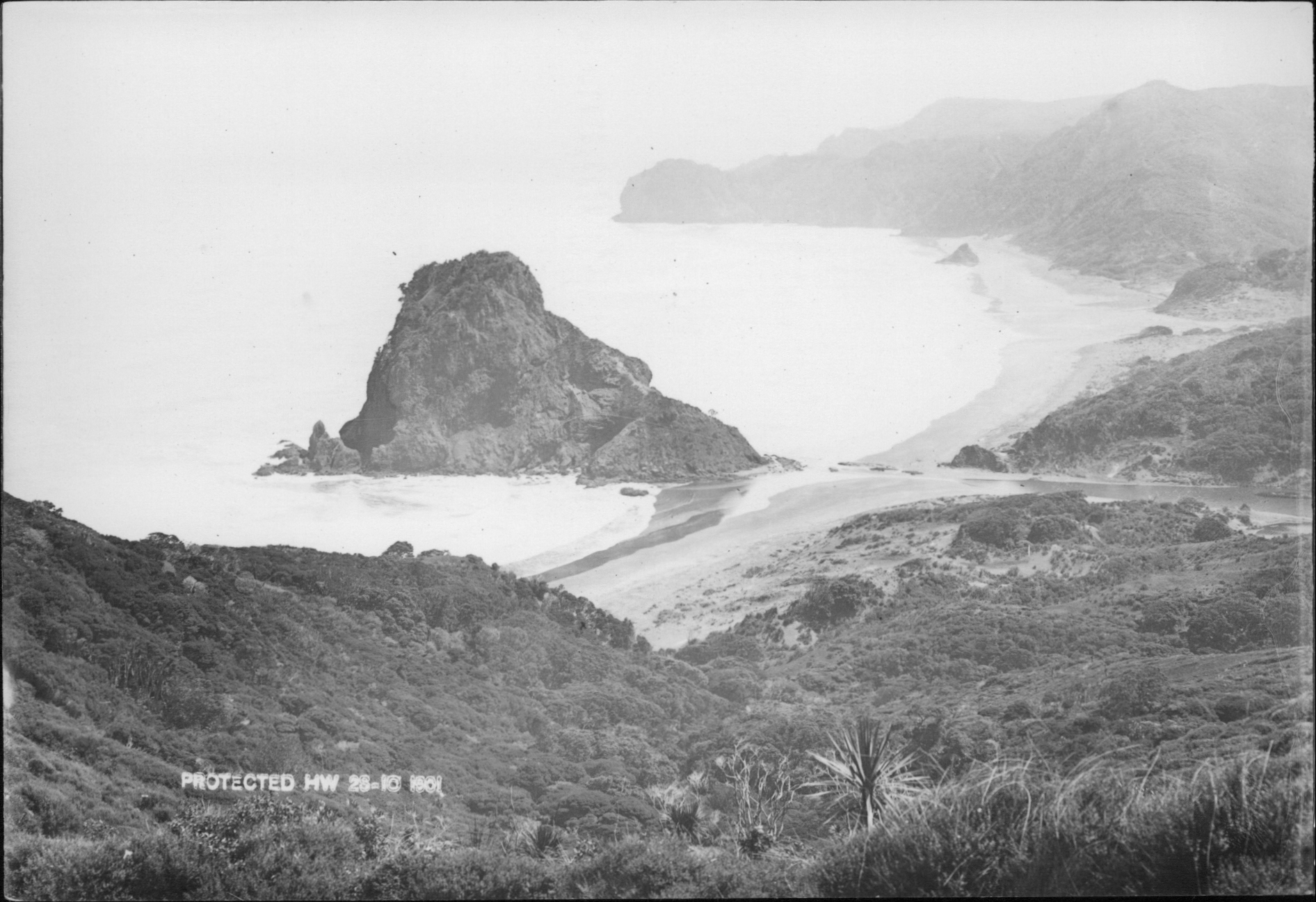
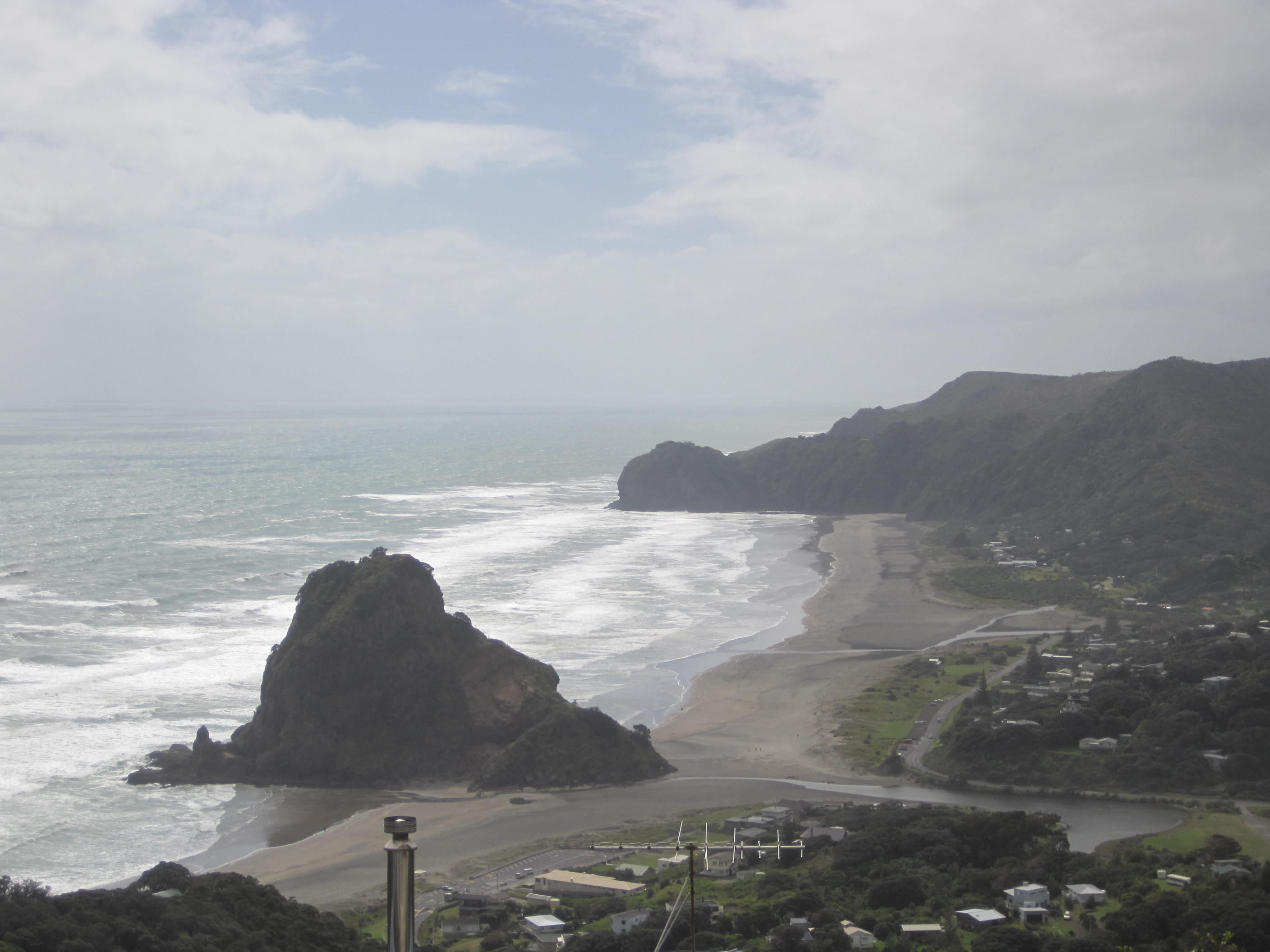
Photographs of Lion Rock from 1901 and 2017, showing the development of Piha village and effects of erosion on the headland

The island is a volcanic plug of the Miocene era Waitākere Volcano, composed of stratified rudite and intrusive andesite. The rock is what remains of one of the volcano's funnel-shaped vents on the eastern side of the mountain, which was uplifted from the sea 17 million years ago. As the volcano aged and eroded, the Lion Rock vent filled with collapsed lava, scoria and volcanic bombs, until it formed into its modern-day shape.

== History ==
The traditional name for the rock is Te Piha, and is a name that was applied to the wider area. The name Te Piha came from the pattern made when waves hit against the rock. Lion Rock is in the rohe of Te Kawerau ā Maki, and was the location of island pā known as Whakaari, which literally means "exposed to view" or "display". The pā was captured by a Ngāti Whātua war party led by Tainui warrior Kāwharu around the year 1700.

Archaeological surveys have shown the remains of platforms, midden and terraces on Lion Rock, as well as fragments of traditional textiles, dating back to a time before European contact. The earthworks of Whakaari pā are not well preserved due to erosion.
