= Kitekite Falls =

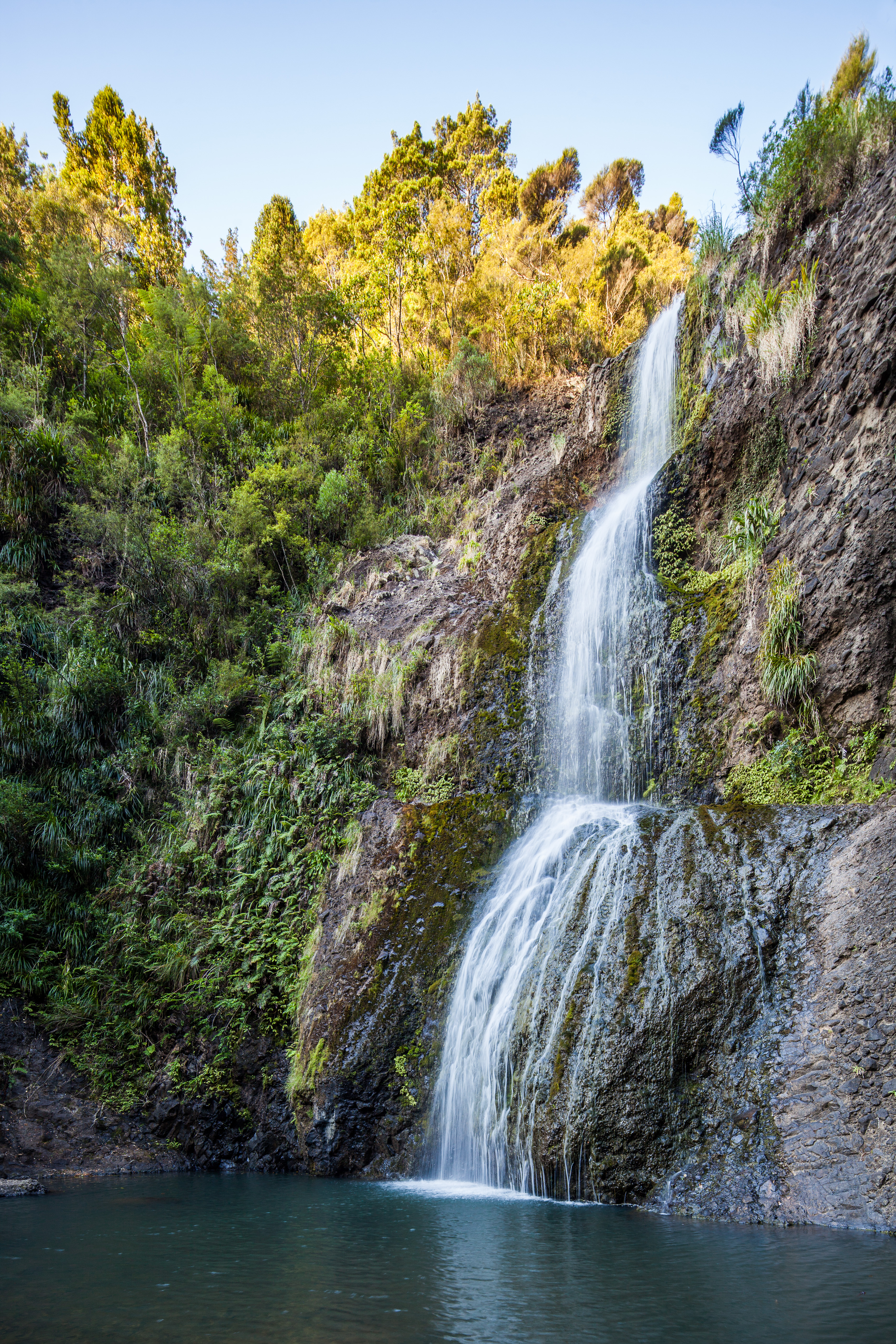
- The 40 metre, 3-tiered Kitekite falls, along with the cascades above the falls and the natural pool at its base
- Interactive map of Kitekite Falls
- Location: Piha
- Coordinates: 36.96082°S 174.48972°E
- Total height: 40 metres (130 ft)
- Watercourse: Glen Esk Stream

Kitekite Falls (also called Kitakita Falls) is a scenic 3-tiered waterfall near Auckland, New Zealand. The falls drop a total of 40 metres (130 ft). From the lookout on Kitekite track the falls appear even higher because there is white water running over rocks into a small pool from the upper swimming hole, then falling down into a large pool, then falling to a small pool before beginning an almost vertical descent in the final 3-tiers, making the total height closer to 80 metres (260 ft). The falls are located on the Glen Esk Stream near Piha Beach.

== Etymology ==
The name 'Kitekite' is likely a misspelling. While sometimes listed as Kitakita, Te Kawerau ā Maki kaumātua Rewi Spraggon believes the traditional name was Ketekete, referring to a clicking sound made before an ambush. 'Glen Esk' stream was named by William Stockwell. He emigrated to New Zealand in 1876 and bought land above Kitekite Falls soon after his arrival. He named the area 'Glen Esk' because it reminded him of his homeland in Scotland. 'Glen', from Gaelic, an Indo-European language spoken in Scotland and Ireland, means 'valley'. 'Esk' is of Celtic origin and means 'water'.

== History ==
The area close to Kitekite Falls was milled for kauri from 1910, when logs were flushed downstream to the Piha Mill. The mill operated adjacent to the waterfall (downstream at the site of Stedfast Park) until 1921. All the mature trees in the area were cut down.

The top of the falls was the location of the Glen Esk Dam, constructed by Ebenezer Gibbons in 1911, as a dam used to propel kauri logs to the Piha Mill below. The drop over the waterfall proved too steep for the logs which were damaged by the descent. After this was recognised, the dam was converted into a holding dam for kauri logs.

== Kitekite Falls walk ==
The waterfalls are accessible by the Kitekite Track. A loop track, used by around 30,000 people a year (2005), follows the Glen Esk Stream with minor undulations (on the south side) up to a lookout with a large Macrocarpa bench seat, made by offenders doing community work (2005). The track then descends down wooden steps to the base of the falls (40 minutes from the carpark). The track then crosses the stream next to the lower swimming hole and returns down the north side. Walkers can also climb a reasonably steep track (the Connect Track), which begins about 100m from the base of the falls on the northern side of the stream. It takes about 15 minutes to get to the top of the falls. There is a swimming hole at the top.

The walk reopened Boxing Day 2018 with more covered walkways to protect the kauri. It had been closed to the public due to kauri dieback and under rāhui from Te Kawerau ā Maki in conjunction with the Waitākere Ranges Local Board and Auckland Council. Te Kawerau ā Maki have released a clarification on the area covered by the Waitakere rāhui to make it clear to residents and visitors that it only covers the forest, but that within the forest all tracks are closed by the rāhui. From the carpark at the end of Glenesk Road, directions are clearly signposted.

== Local flora and fauna ==
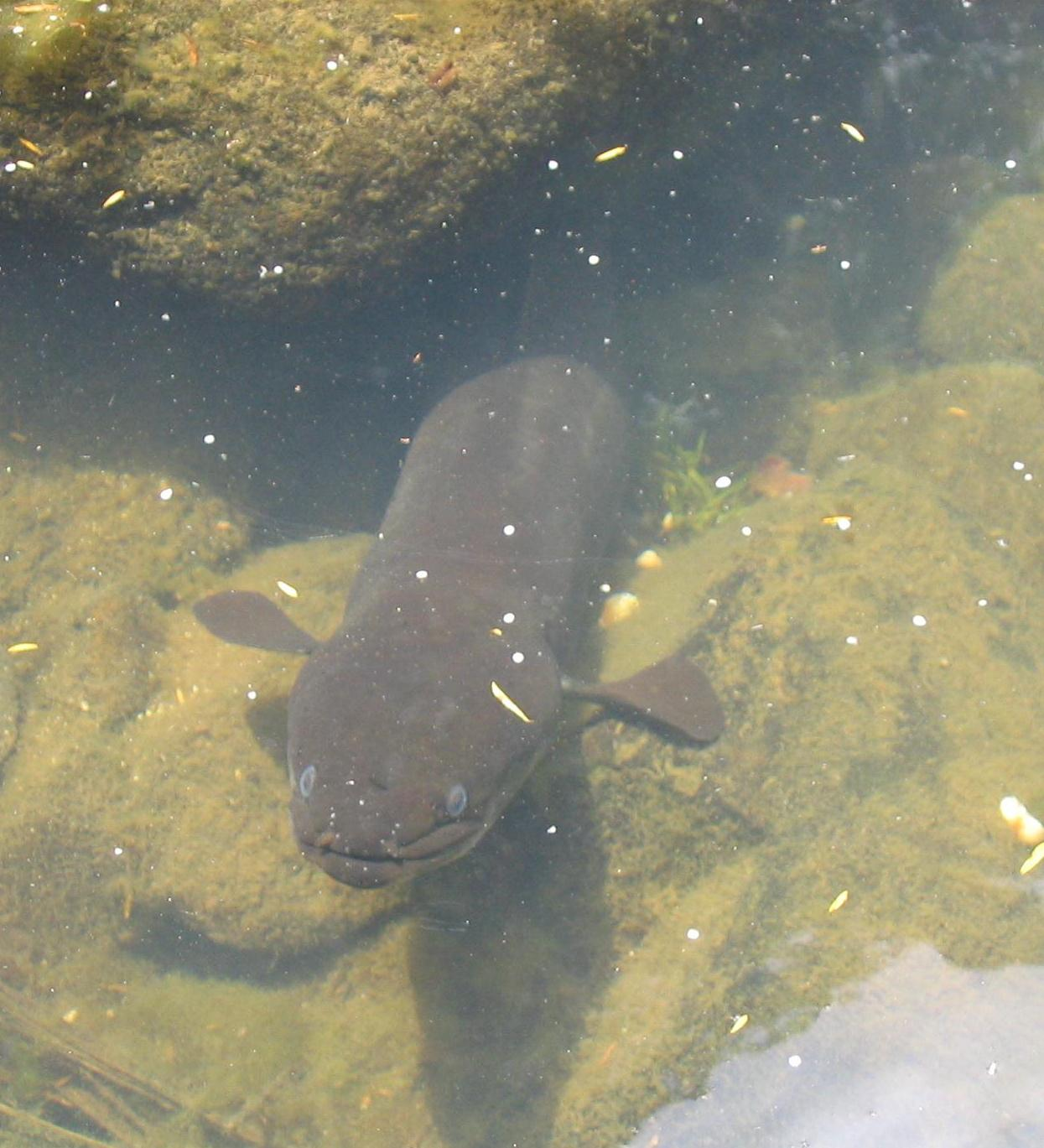
New Zealand long fin eel at the base of the falls.

It has taken many decades for the young kauri (Agathis australis), known as 'rickers', to regenerate and finally begin to emerge through the forest canopy again. Many sharp-pointed, cone-shaped rickers can be seen from the Kitekite loop track near the falls. At about 100 years old, kauri begin to develop a spreading crown. It is now approaching 100 years since milling stopped. The crowns generally continue to expand for a further 500 years.

The walk to the falls progresses through a patch of nīkau palms where the call of the tūī is frequently heard from above. Other native plants include silver tree-ferns, pūriri trees whose red berries attract kererū (native pigeon), and the rangiora plant (termed 'bushman's friend' due to the soft underside of its broad leaf). The falls have been identified as a site of a rare moss Fissidens rigidulus var. pseudostrictus.

New Zealand longfin eel, (Anguilla dieffenbachii) hide among the rocks around the base of the falls.

== Canyoning ==
The falls are used for canyoning by an Auckland Regional Parks licensed operator. The issuing of the licence was a 'hot issue' at the 2002 AGM of the Piha Ratepayers and Residents Association where residents voiced concern over the environmental impact to the Kitekite Falls. However, ARC recreation coordinator Lee Whiley said there were no concerns. This recreational activity continues to this day under close monitoring by council. Climbing on the falls (going off track) is strictly prohibited and can only be done with a permit or licensed guide. Restrictions are in place to protect the rare moss growing in the wet areas of the waterfall.

== Gallery ==
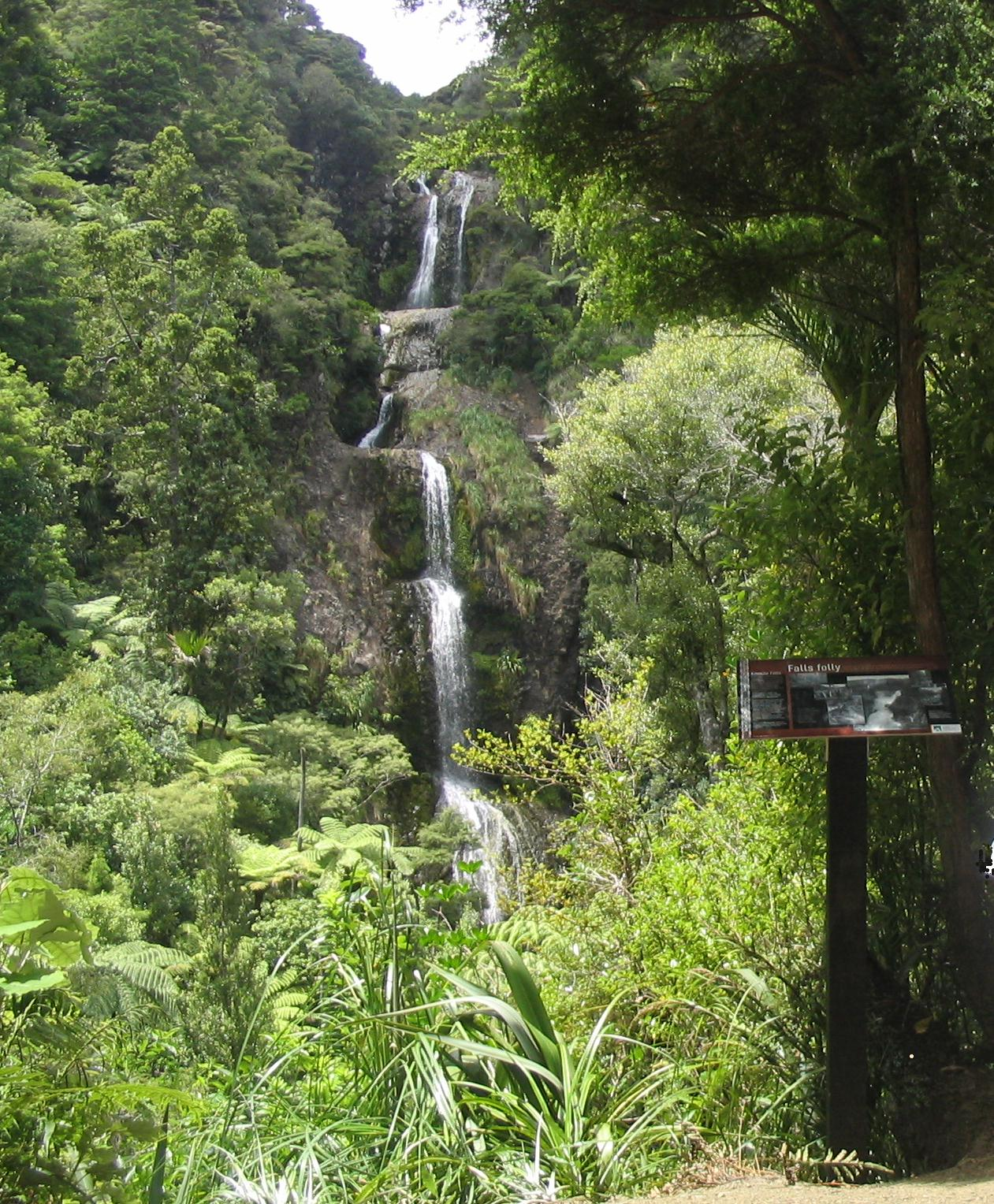
View from the Kitekite track lookout. The track then takes a steep descent to the base of the falls.

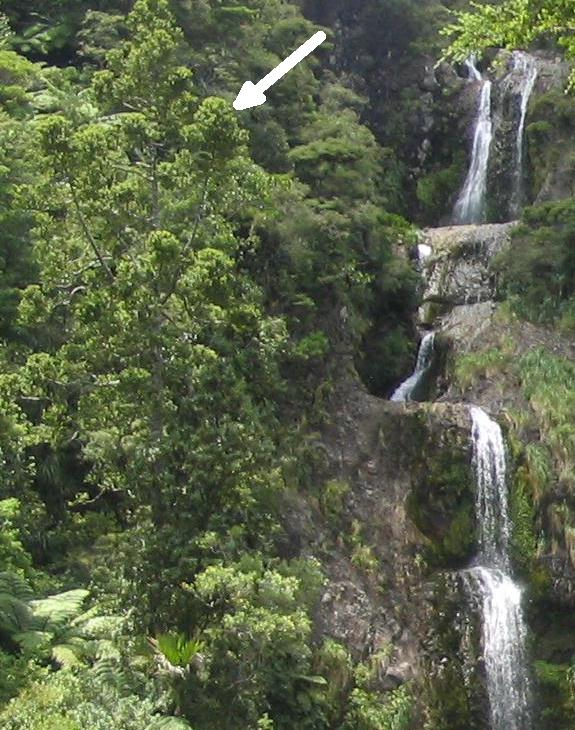
This young Kauri is around 100 years old. Its crown is beginning to spread above the forest canopy.

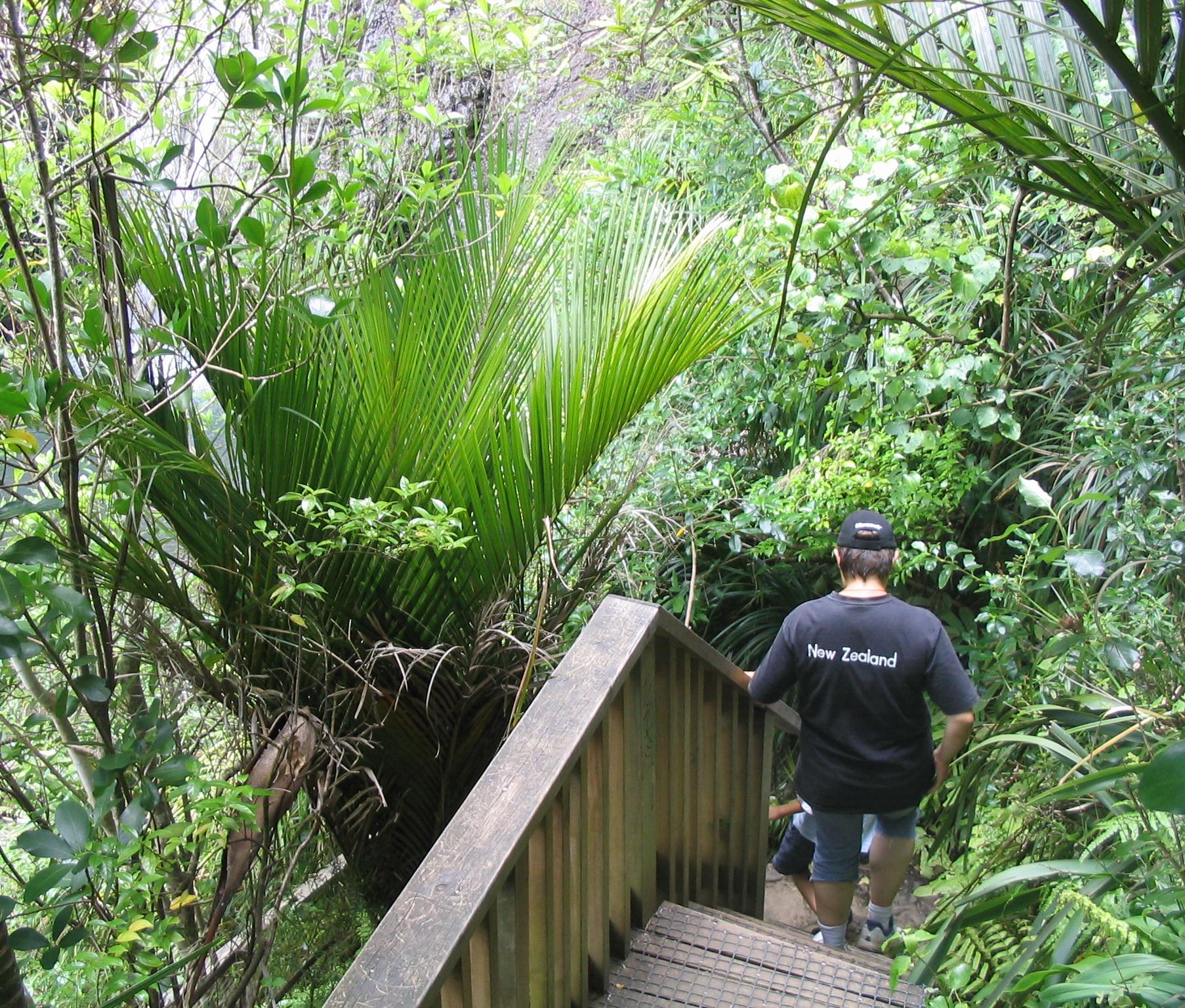
The Kitekite track descending to the base of the falls after the lookout. A beautiful Nikau Palm.

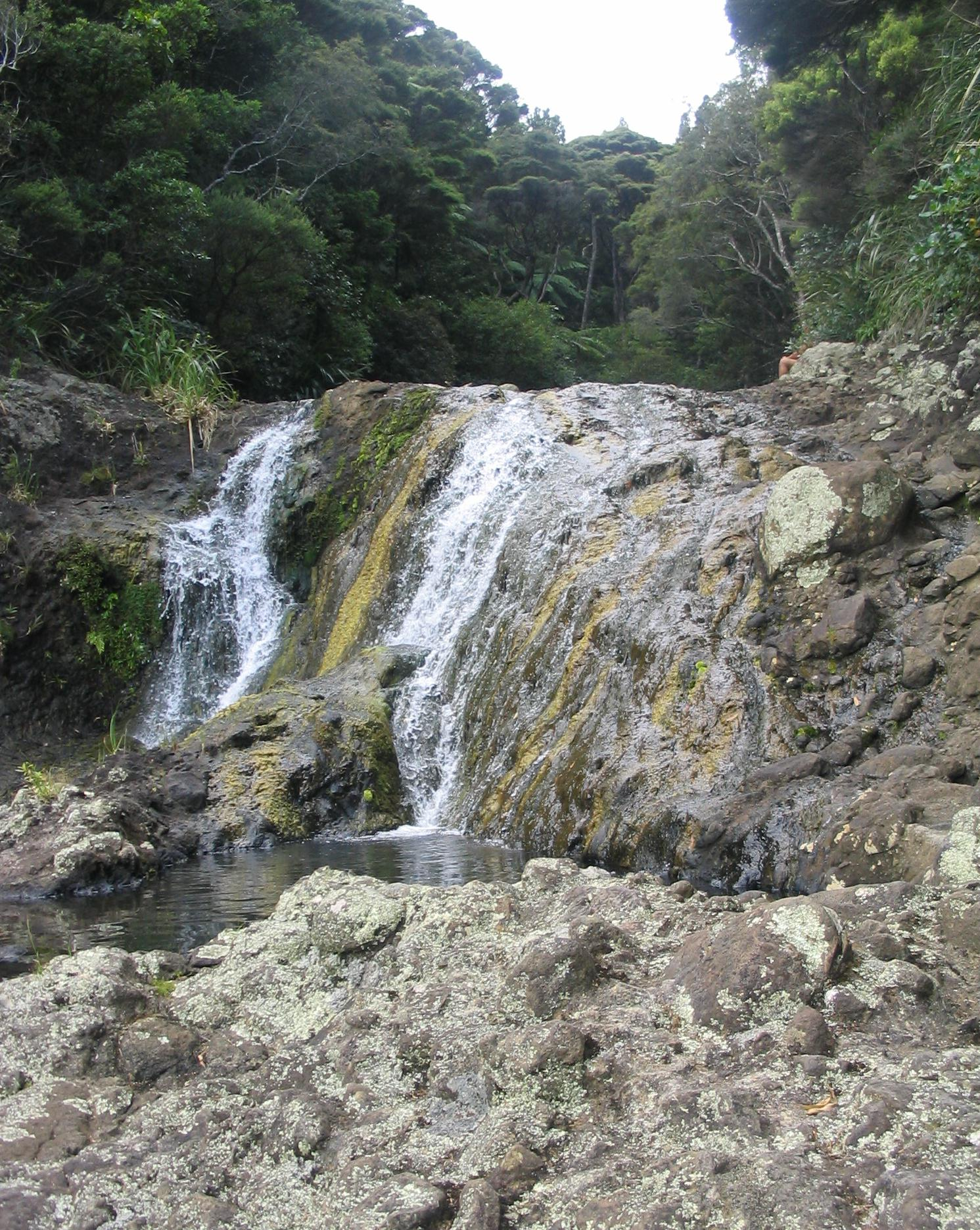
The upper swimming hole is just out of view above this small white water fall.

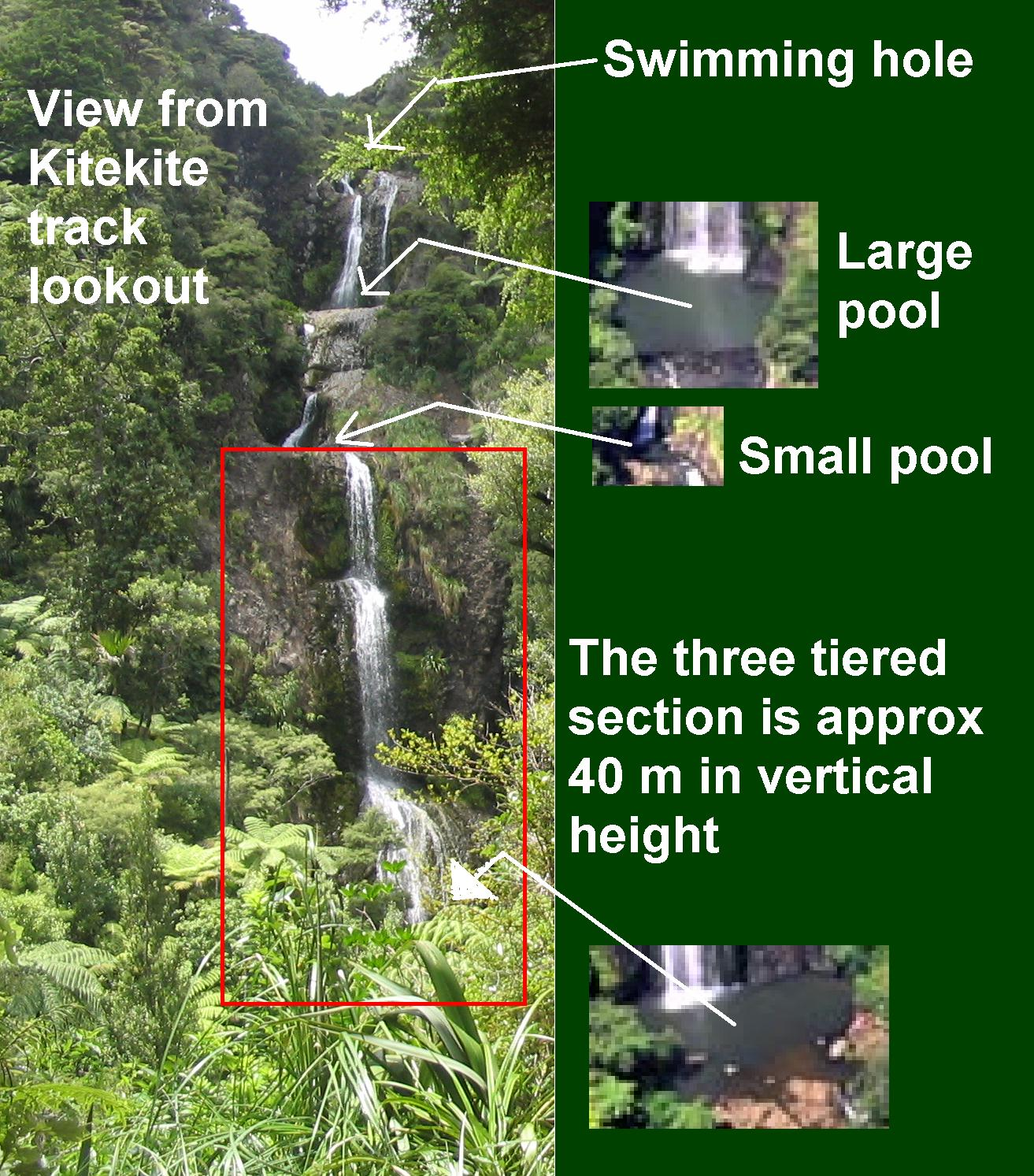
The 3-tiered falls descend 40m. Above them, waterfalls cascade over rocks (set back in pic)down about 40 m.

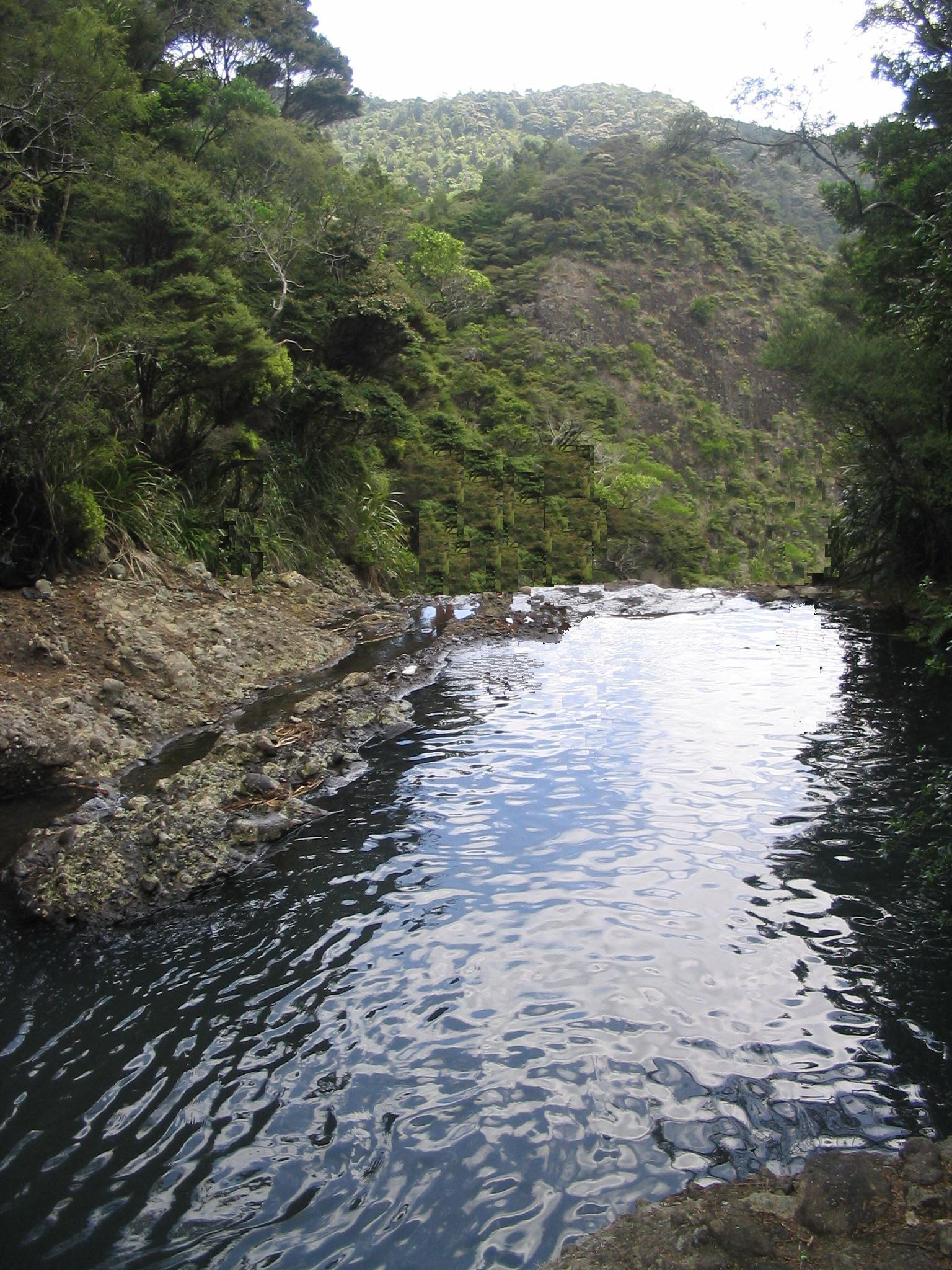
From this upper swimming hole, water cascades down 40 m before a final descent of 40 m over the three tiers.

== See also ==
- List of waterfalls
- Waterfalls of New Zealand
