= Piha Stream =

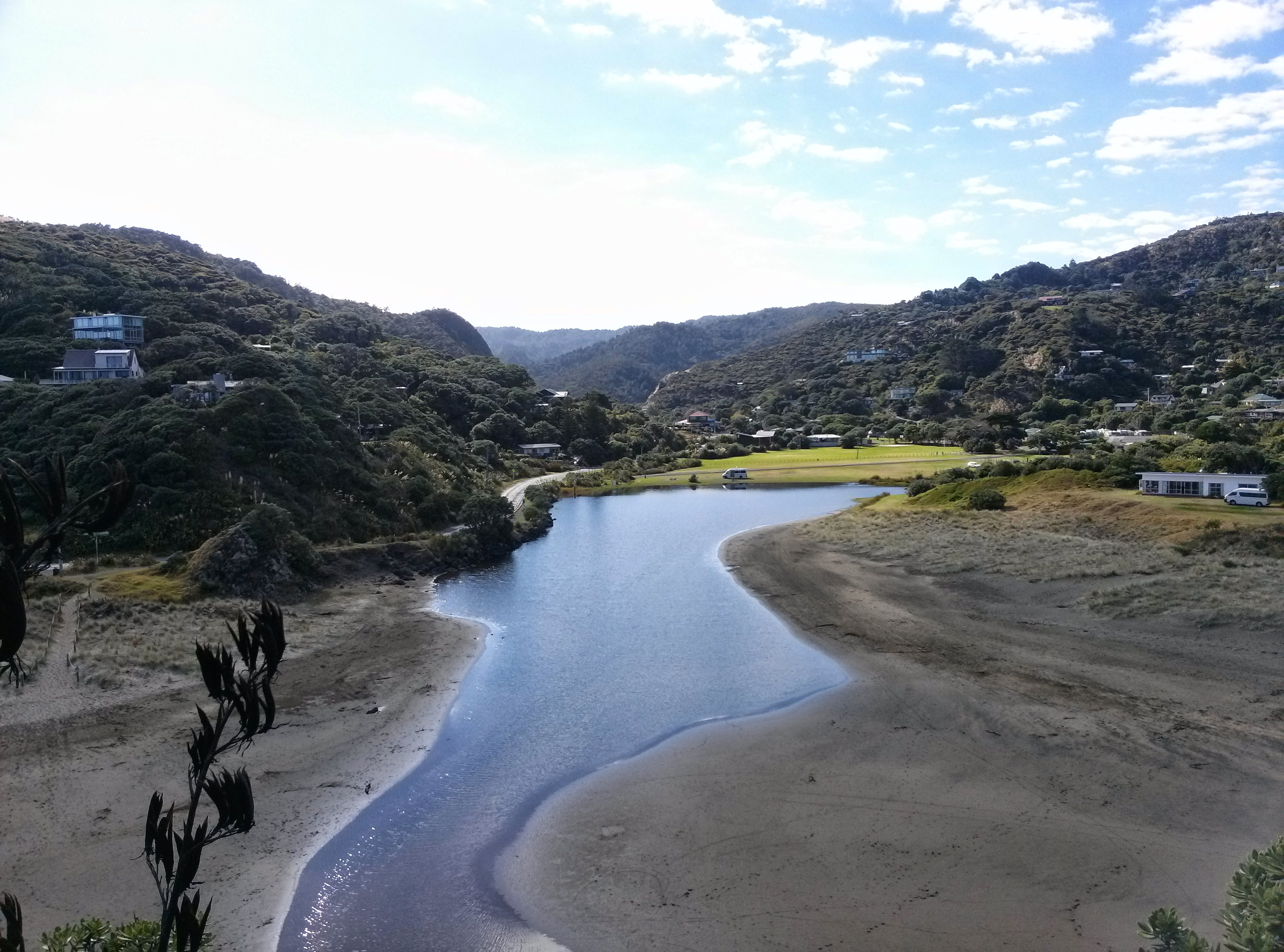
- Piha Stream seen from Lion Rock

- Mouth of Piha Stream Piha Stream (New Zealand)
- Route of the Piha Stream
- Native name: Waiokahu

Location
- Country: New Zealand
- Region: Auckland Region

Physical characteristics
- Source: Waitākere Ranges
  - coordinates: 36.945°S 174.525°E
- Mouth: Tasman Sea
  - coordinates: 36.9534°S 174.4681°E

Basin features
- Progression: Piha Stream → Tasman Sea
- Landmarks: Piha
- Tributaries
  - left: Glen Esk Stream
  - right: Centennial Stream, McKenzie Stream, Maungaroa Stream, Slipper Gully, Ingram Stream
- Bridges: Piha Eel Foot Bridge

Piha Stream is a stream of the Auckland Region of New Zealand's North Island. It flows westwards from its sources in the Waitākere Ranges through Piha village, and enters the Tasman Sea south of Lion Rock.

== Geography ==
The stream begins in the Waitākere Ranges near the junction of Piha Road and Anawhata Road. It flows westwards towards the Tasman Sea, joined by a number of tributaries: Centennial Stream, McKenzie Stream, Maungaroa Stream, Glen Esk Stream, Slipper Gully and Ingram Stream. The upper section of the Piha Stream features a small canyon, and an estuary is found at the mouth of the stream.

== Biodiversity ==
The stream is a known habitat for the shortjaw kōkopu and giant kōkopu, and the pouched lamprey.

== History ==
The stream is in the rohe of Te Kawerau ā Maki, and was given the name Waiokahu by the ancestor Rakataura of the Tainui migratory canoe, who named it "The Waters of Kahu" after his wife Kahukeke, who found the Piha Valley area beautiful. The stream was used as a place by Tāmaki Māori to catch piharau (lampreys) as they ascended from the ocean.

The Black Rock Dam was built around the year 1910 on the Piha Stream, as a driving dam for kauri logging.

In 2008, a new footbridge was constructed across the Piha Stream. Designed by local artist Mandy Patmore, the bridge depicts the lifecycle of the New Zealand longfin eel.

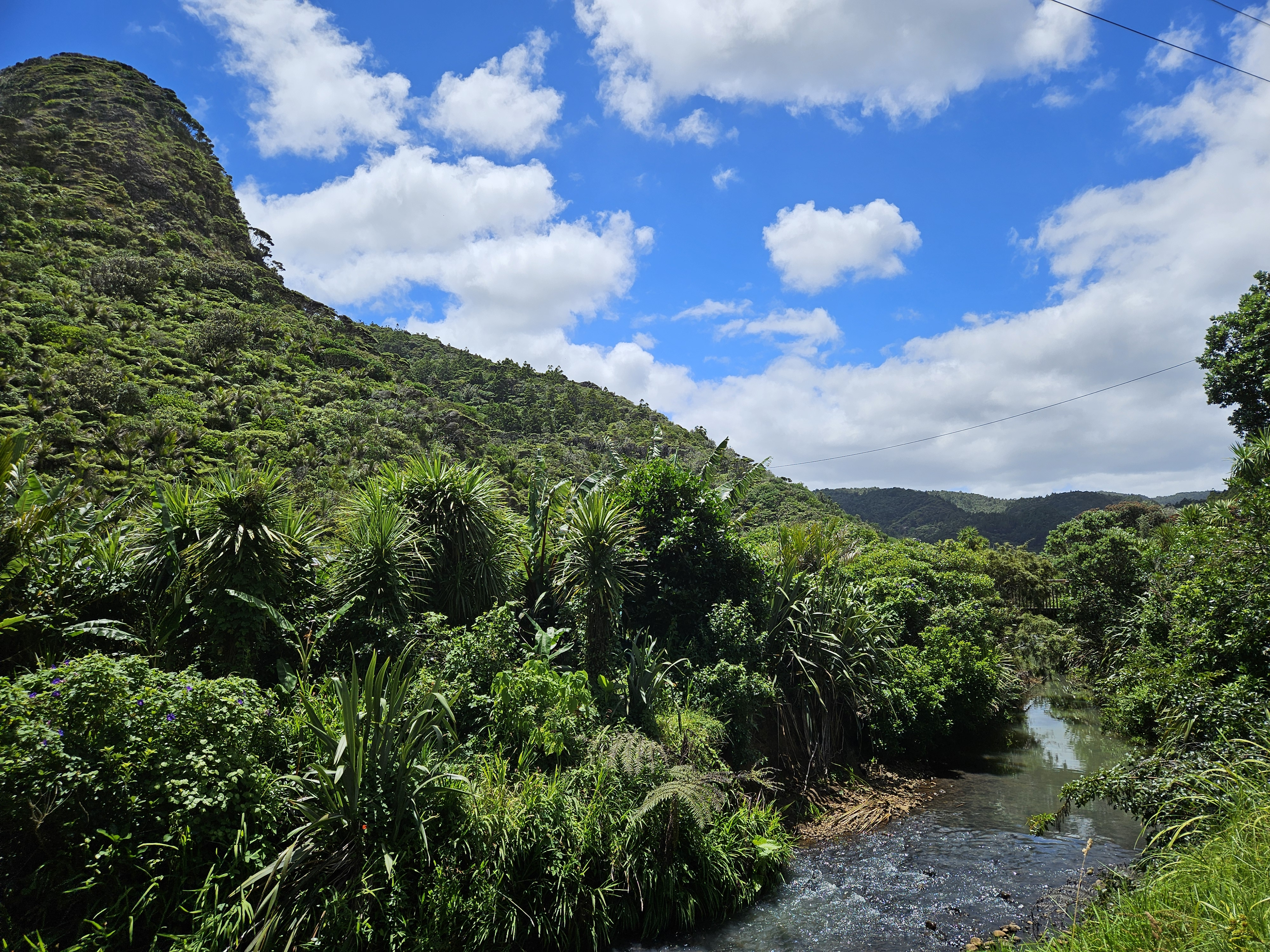
Kitenui Knob and Piha Stream

== Recreation ==
The Piha canyon is a place where abseiling can be done.

== See also ==
- List of rivers of New Zealand
