= Disappearance of Iraena Asher =

New Zealand student and model missing since 2004

Iraena Asher
- Born: Iraena Te Rama Awhina Asher; 17 July 1979; Auckland, New Zealand
- Disappeared: 11 October 2004 (aged 25); Piha, New Zealand
- Status: Missing for 22 years, 1 month and 6 days
- Occupations: Trainee teacher, model

Iraena Te Rama Awhina Asher (born 17 July 1979) was an Auckland trainee teacher and model who disappeared under controversial circumstances at Piha, a West Auckland beach, on 11 October 2004.

== Disappearance ==
Asher apparently spent time at a new boyfriend's home at Piha on 10 October 2004. At 9 pm that evening, she called the New Zealand Police using the 1-1-1 emergency telephone number, expressing fears for her safety.

Although a patrol car could have been made available to attend this incident, police decided to call a taxi for Asher to pick her up. Police said later that people sometimes obtained a free ride home in a police car after making a false emergency call. A taxi was dispatched, but it went to the wrong street in Onehunga, on the other side of the city from Piha. Asher was later found wandering the streets by a Piha couple, Julia Woodhouse and Bobbie Carroll, who took her into their home for several hours. At 1:10 am, she left their home and was subsequently seen by others, semi-clad, walking towards the beach. She ran off before she could be approached. This was the last known sighting of her.

Asher's family told police that she suffered from bipolar disorder.

In May 2005, Asher's family held a memorial service for her, telling mourners that if police had responded properly to her emergency call, she might be alive today. Her parents, Betty and Mike Asher, were said to be considering bringing a lawsuit against the New Zealand Police, on unspecified grounds. No legal proceedings were ever commenced by her parents. Mike Asher also went missing in January 2023 and was found dead of a heart attack three days later.

== Inquest ==
An inquest into her disappearance began on 17 July 2012. The police investigation into her disappearance found that she most likely drowned. During the inquest, the coroner criticised Woodhouse and Carroll for not calling the police themselves. The High Court subsequently found that the suggestion that their failure to call the police had contributed to Asher's death was based on speculation.

== See also ==
- List of people who disappeared mysteriously: post-1970
