= Anawhata =

Beach in Auckland, New Zealand

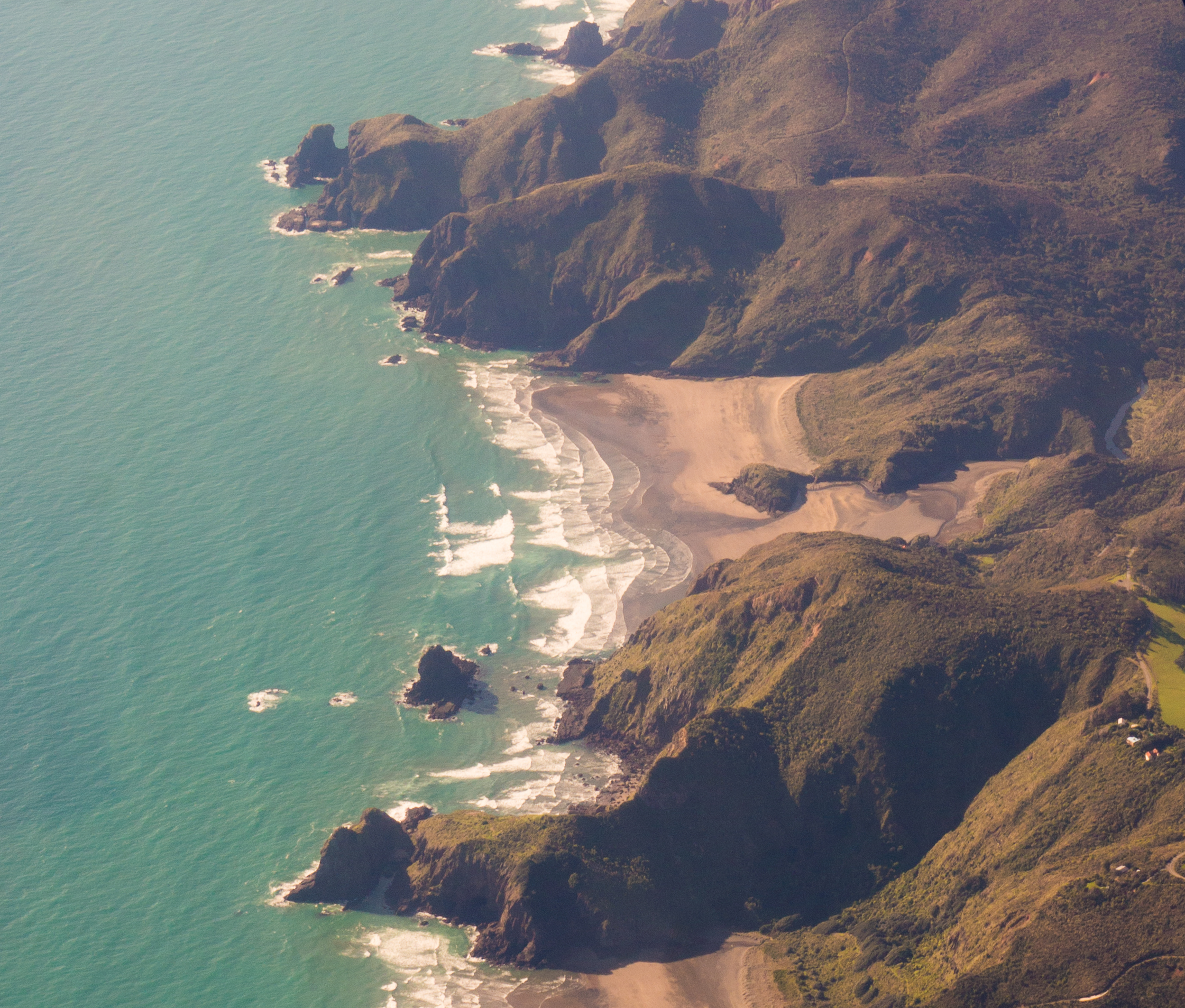
- Aerial view of Anawhata

- Location within the Auckland Region
- Location: Auckland Region, New Zealand
- Coordinates: 36°55′15″S 174°27′18″E
- Ocean/sea sources: Tasman Sea
- Islands: Keyhole Rock

Anawhata is a beach on the coast of New Zealand west of Auckland.

== Geography ==
Anawhata Beach is located along the West Coast of West Auckland, between the Tasman Sea and the Waitākere Ranges. It is located south of Te Henga / Bethells Beach, and north of Piha. The Anawhata Stream exits into the Tasman Sea at Anawhata.

The beach and coastal area including Parera Point is home to a number of plant species, including New Zealand flax, toetoe, tauhinu, Muehlenbeckia axillaris and buffalo grass.

== History ==
Local iwi (tribe) Te Kawerau ā Maki occupied this area for hundreds of years, and many settlements and fortifications were established. The name Anawhata refers to the elevated rock shelters found in the surrounding bluffs, which were used during seasonal fishing expeditions. These caves feature in Te Kawerau ā Maki legends, where a woman of high birth was saved from being imprisoned in a cave on the beach, by her lover who rescued her by lowering a rope down from the cliff face above the cave. The legend may the reason why the name Anawhata became popularly used among Te Kawerau ā Maki.

By 1870, Europeans had established farms and timber mills. A 14 km tramway was built between Anawhata and Whatipu to transport kauri logs.

== Location ==
Distance from Auckland; 40 km (50 minute drive). To the south of Anawhata are Piha, Karekare and Whatipu. To the north is Te Henga (Bethells Beach) and Muriwai. It is one of the least used beaches in the area because there is a long and unsealed road to reach it, and a steep track (Anawhata Beach Track) from there down to the beach.

== Recreation ==
As far back as 1966 the Auckland Tramping Club used the Anawhata stream for a day trip. Trampers were dropped off in the hills above the stream, and collected many hours later from the beach in an old bus.

The beach has no surf patrol, and as with all the beaches west of Auckland, swimming may not be safe due to rips.

== Panorama ==
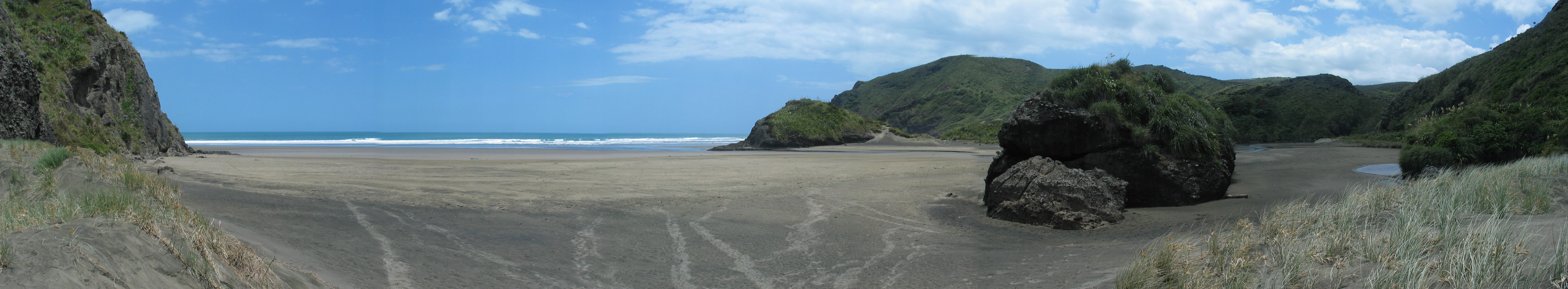
Anawhata beach
