= GHS =

GHS may refer to:

== Education ==
- Gaithersburg High School, Gaithersburg, Maryland, US
- Gallatin High School, several schools
- Glastonbury High School, Glastonbury, Connecticut, US
- Glendora High School, a school in Glendora, Los Angeles, US
- Glenunga International High School, formerly Glenunga High School, a school in Adelaide, South Australia
- Gloucester High School (Virginia), a school in Gloucester, Virginia, US
- Grafton High School (disambiguation), several schools
- Grant High School (disambiguation), several schools
- Grandview High School, Aurora, Colorado, US
- Grapevine High School, Grapevine, Texas, US
- Greenwich High School, Greenwich, Connecticut, US
- Greenwood High School (disambiguation), several schools
- Guam High School (disambiguation), several schools
- Gulf Harbour School, Whangaparaoa, Auckland, New Zealand

== Healthcare ==
- Geisinger Health System, Pennsylvania, US
- Ghana Health Service
- Global Health Security Index

== Other uses ==
- General Household Survey (South Africa), a national household survey in South Africa
- General Household Survey (United Kingdom), a defunct national household survey in the UK
- Georgia Historical Society, US
- Ghanaian cedi, currency
- Globally Harmonized System of Classification and Labelling of Chemicals
- Green Hills Software, an American software company
- Growth hormone secretagogue
- GHS (strings), a US guitar string manufacturer
