= Matakatia =

- Suburb
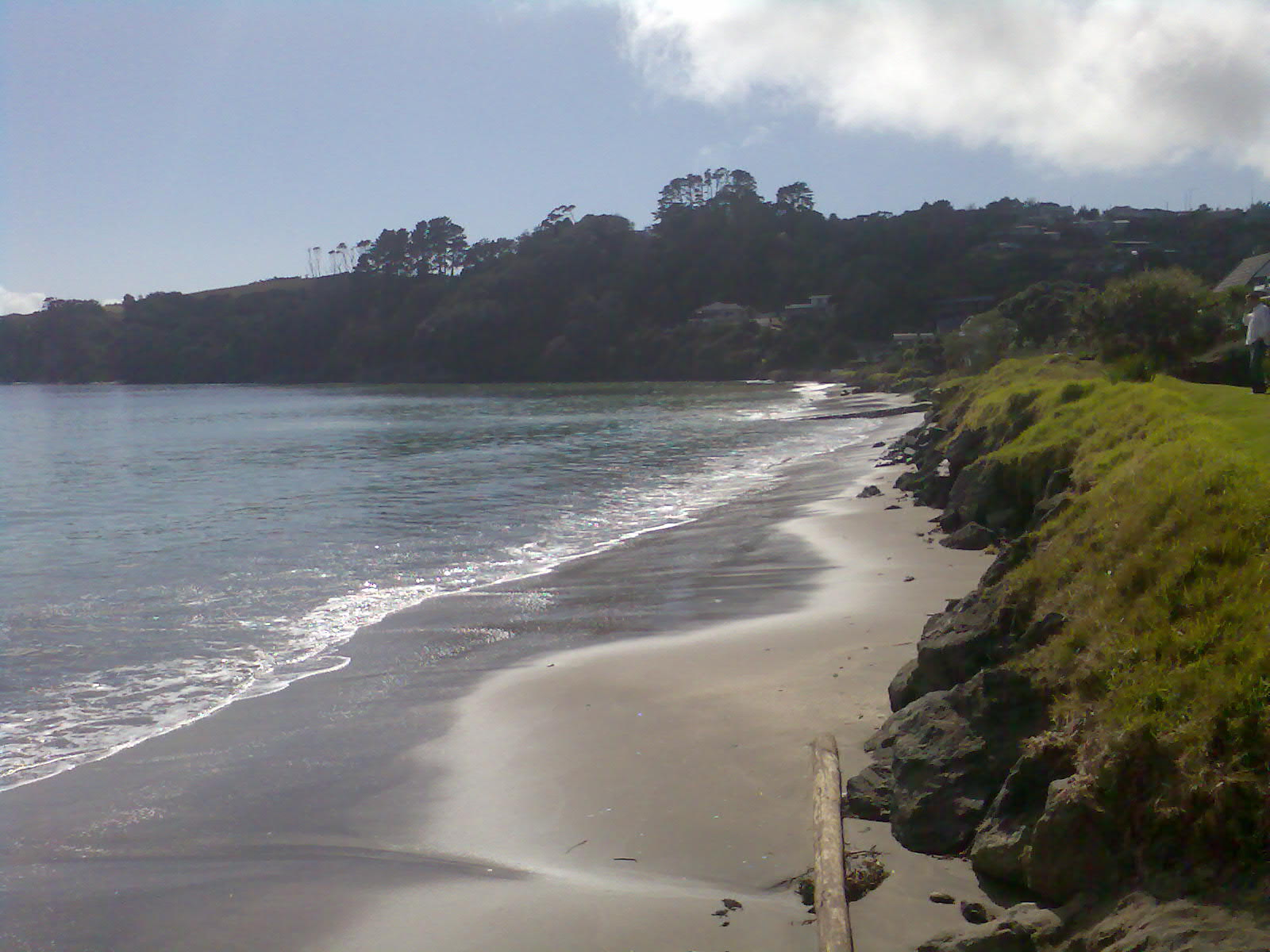
- Tindalls Beach
- Interactive map of Matakatia
- Coordinates: 36.620720°S 174.779100°E
- Country: New Zealand
- City: Auckland
- Local authority: Auckland Council
- Electoral ward: Albany ward
- Local board: Hibiscus and Bays

Area
  - Land: 293 ha (720 acres)

Population (June 2025)
  - Total: 1,970
  - Density: 672/km^{2} (1,740/sq mi)
- Postcode: 0930

	Tindalls Beach	Gulf Harbour
(Polkinghornes Bay)	Matakatia	Gulf Harbour
Manly	(Matakatia Bay)

Matakatia is a suburb situated on the Whangaparāoa Peninsula, towards the northern end of Auckland, New Zealand. It is about 43 kilometres (by road) north of the city centre.

Kotanui Island, also called Frenchmans Cap, is a sharp triangular rock rising from the water about 1,000 m (3,300 ft) offshore.

== History ==
The Waiau portage between Matakatia and Tindalls Beach allowed the movement of waka in the early 19th century.

A road was developed through the area in 1938 and sections were sold the following year.

The area to the north was Tindall's farm in the 1920s and is now the suburb of Tindalls Beach.

== Demographics ==
Tindalls-Matakatia statistical area, which includes Tindalls Beach, covers 2.93 km^{2} (1.13 sq mi) and had an estimated population of 1,970 as of June 2025, with a population density of 672 people per km^{2}.

Historical population
Year	Pop.	±% p.a.
2006	1,548	—
2013	1,749	+1.76%
2018	1,977	+2.48%
2023	1,938	−0.40%

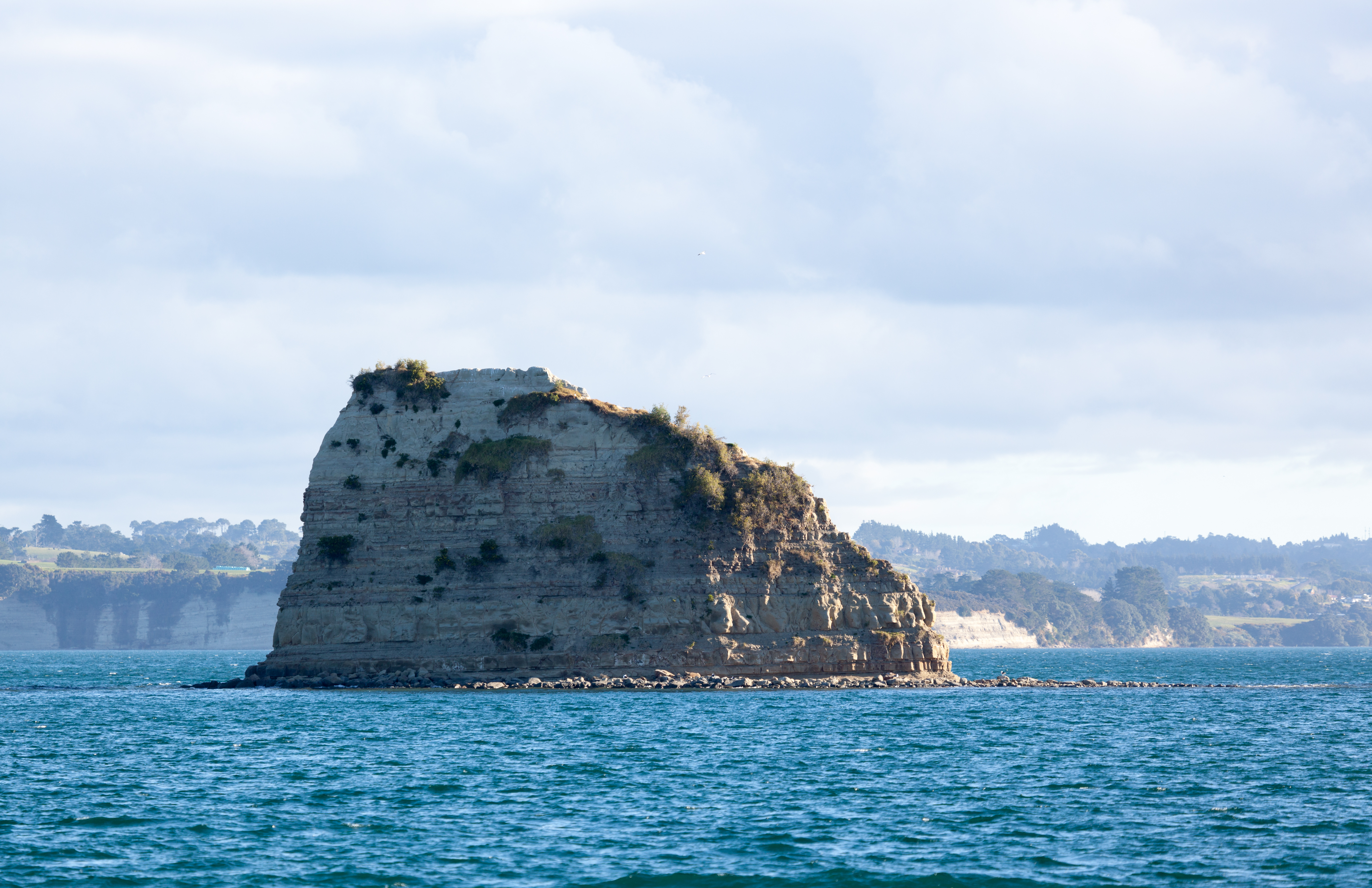
Kotanui Island

Tindalls-Matakatia had a population of 1,938 in the 2023 New Zealand census, a decrease of 39 people (−2.0%) since the 2018 census, and an increase of 189 people (10.8%) since the 2013 census. There were 951 males, 978 females and 6 people of other genders in 729 dwellings. 2.2% of people identified as LGBTIQ+. The median age was 49.6 years (compared with 38.1 years nationally). There were 294 people (15.2%) aged under 15 years, 270 (13.9%) aged 15 to 29, 900 (46.4%) aged 30 to 64, and 474 (24.5%) aged 65 or older.

People could identify as more than one ethnicity. The results were 89.6% European (Pākehā); 8.8% Māori; 2.6% Pasifika; 7.1% Asian; 1.5% Middle Eastern, Latin American and African New Zealanders (MELAA); and 2.3% other, which includes people giving their ethnicity as "New Zealander". English was spoken by 98.0%, Māori language by 1.2%, Samoan by 0.2%, and other languages by 13.8%. No language could be spoken by 0.9% (e.g. too young to talk). New Zealand Sign Language was known by 0.2%. The percentage of people born overseas was 33.3, compared with 28.8% nationally.

Religious affiliations were 32.0% Christian, 0.2% Hindu, 0.2% Māori religious beliefs, 0.3% Buddhist, 0.5% New Age, 0.2% Jewish, and 1.2% other religions. People who answered that they had no religion were 57.1%, and 8.7% of people did not answer the census question.

Of those at least 15 years old, 342 (20.8%) people had a bachelor's or higher degree, 873 (53.1%) had a post-high school certificate or diploma, and 321 (19.5%) people exclusively held high school qualifications. The median income was $43,200, compared with $41,500 nationally. 345 people (21.0%) earned over $100,000 compared to 12.1% nationally. The employment status of those at least 15 was that 780 (47.4%) people were employed full-time, 255 (15.5%) were part-time, and 24 (1.5%) were unemployed.
