= Arkles Bay =

- Suburb
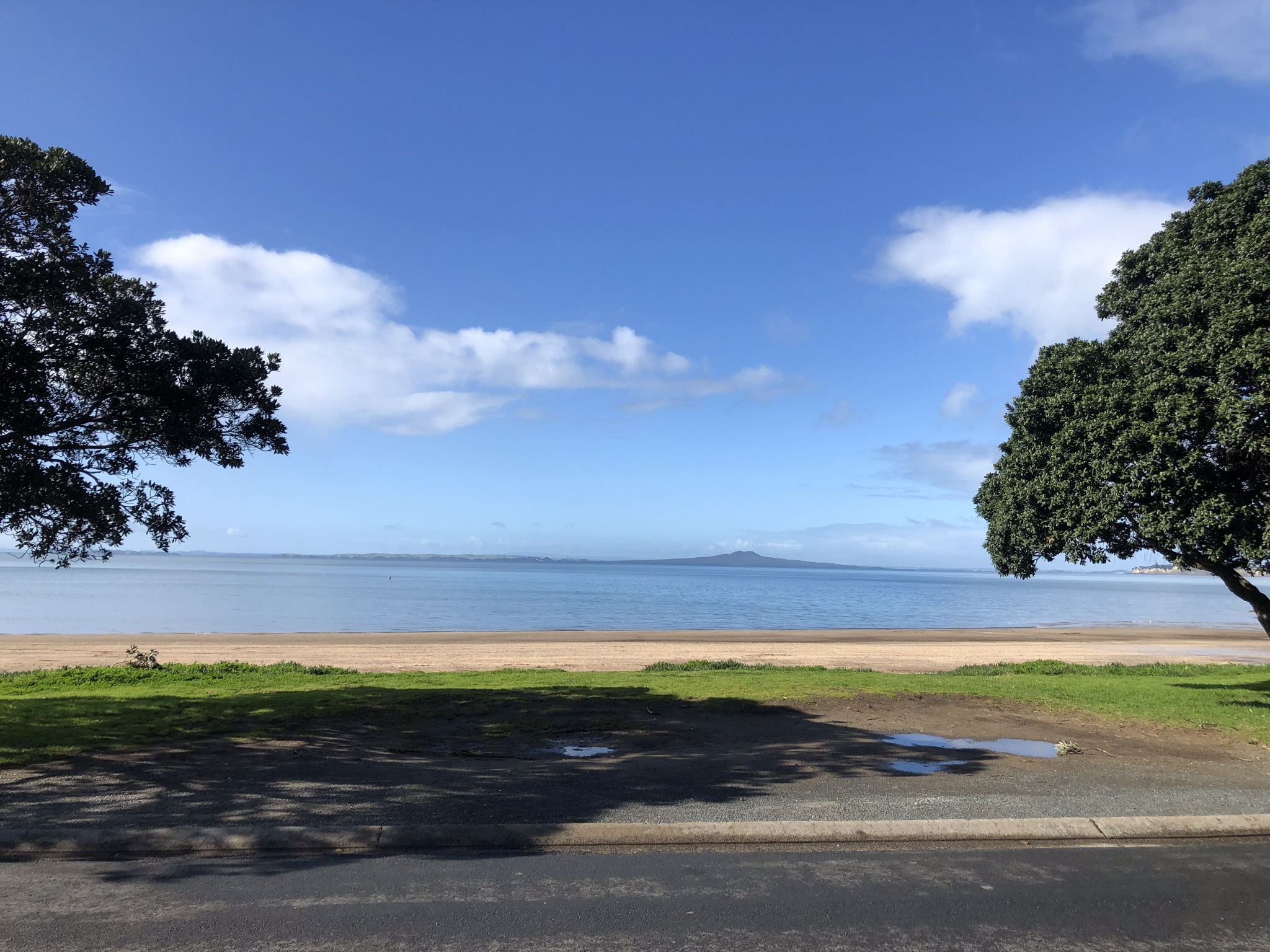
- Interactive map of Arkles Bay
- Coordinates: 36.64252994°S 174.75061100°E
- Country: New Zealand
- City: Auckland
- Local authority: Auckland Council
- Electoral ward: Albany ward
- Local board: Hibiscus and Bays Local Board

Area
  - Land: 166 ha (410 acres)

Population (June 2025)
  - Total: 2,030
  - Density: 1,220/km^{2} (3,170/sq mi)
- Postcode: 0932

Stanmore Bay	Whangaparaoa	Manly
Weiti River	Arkles Bay
	(Hauraki Gulf / Tīkapa Moana)

Arkles Bay is one of the northernmost suburbs of the contiguous Auckland metropolitan area located in New Zealand. It is located on the southern side of the Whangaparaoa Peninsula, in the Hibiscus Coast, located 25 kilometres (16 mi) north of the Auckland CBD. It is part of the Albany Ward area for local government purposes. Arkles Bay is known for its sheltered beaches, suitable for swimming and paddle boarding.

== History ==
The first European settler in the area was William Laing Thorburn, who bought land here in 1854 after cutting firewood in the Weiti River area from 1848 onwards. In 1878, the farm was bought by Scottish immigrant George Arkles, who operated boarding houses with his brother Andrew Arkles from the bay.

== Demographics ==
Arkles Bay, including Wade Heads, covers 1.66 km^{2} (0.64 sq mi) and had an estimated population of 2,030 as of June 2025, with a population density of 1,223 people per km^{2}.

Historical population
Year	Pop.	±% p.a.
2013	1,884	—
2018	1,956	+0.75%
2023	1,998	+0.43%

Wade Heads-Arkles Bay had a population of 1,998 in the 2023 New Zealand census, an increase of 42 people (2.1%) since the 2018 census, and an increase of 114 people (6.1%) since the 2013 census. There were 1,017 males, 978 females and 6 people of other genders in 714 dwellings. 2.9% of people identified as LGBTIQ+. The median age was 43.8 years (compared with 38.1 years nationally). There were 336 people (16.8%) aged under 15 years, 336 (16.8%) aged 15 to 29, 1,008 (50.5%) aged 30 to 64, and 321 (16.1%) aged 65 or older.

People could identify as more than one ethnicity. The results were 89.0% European (Pākehā); 8.0% Māori; 2.7% Pasifika; 6.8% Asian; 1.7% Middle Eastern, Latin American and African New Zealanders (MELAA); and 2.3% other, which includes people giving their ethnicity as "New Zealander". English was spoken by 98.0%, Māori language by 1.1%, Samoan by 0.2%, and other languages by 16.1%. No language could be spoken by 1.4% (e.g. too young to talk). New Zealand Sign Language was known by 0.2%. The percentage of people born overseas was 36.0, compared with 28.8% nationally.

Religious affiliations were 31.5% Christian, 0.6% Hindu, 0.2% Islam, 0.2% Māori religious beliefs, 0.8% Buddhist, 0.3% New Age, 0.2% Jewish, and 1.4% other religions. People who answered that they had no religion were 56.6%, and 8.4% of people did not answer the census question.

Of those at least 15 years old, 306 (18.4%) people had a bachelor's or higher degree, 876 (52.7%) had a post-high school certificate or diploma, and 363 (21.8%) people exclusively held high school qualifications. The median income was $50,700, compared with $41,500 nationally. 306 people (18.4%) earned over $100,000 compared to 12.1% nationally. The employment status of those at least 15 was that 936 (56.3%) people were employed full-time, 252 (15.2%) were part-time, and 39 (2.3%) were unemployed.
