= Penlink =

Road under construction in Auckland, New Zealand

State Highway 19
- O Mahurangi / Penlink
- State Highway 19 route

Route information
- Maintained by NZ Transport Agency Waka Kotahi
- Length: 7 km (4.3 mi)

Major junctions
- South end: SH 1 at Dairy Flat
- North end: Whangaparāoa Road at Stanmore Bay

Location
- Country: New Zealand
- Primary destinations: Whangaparāoa, Stillwater

Highway system
- New Zealand state highways; Motorways and expressways; List
← SH 18	→ SH 20

Penlink (State Highway 19), is a 7-kilometre-long (4.3-mile), two-lane future state highway. Construction began in late 2022 and is expected to conclude in late 2027. Once completed the new state highway will create a more direct and quicker route between the Whangaparāoa Peninsula and central Auckland in New Zealand.

The road is set to provide a second access route off the Whangaparāoa Peninsula, and is claimed by some to be needed to unlock large amounts of commercial land, contribute up to $173 million to GDP during its construction, and create employment estimated at more than 5000 jobs.

== Route ==
The approximately 7-kilometre-long (4.3-mile) Penlink route begins at a new interchange with the Northern Motorway connecting the Whangaparāoa Peninsula with State Highway 1 at Redvale. The interchange includes two southbound city-facing on and off ramps with the ability to construct northbound ramps in the future. The interchange will also include a vehicle connection to East Coast Road, where pedestrians and cyclists can also access the route.

The route will connect the urban areas of the Hibiscus Coast and East Coast Bays, which runs from Waiwera south down the eastern coastline to Campbells Bay.

Along the Penlink route there are three additional interchanges which will help to unlock the western region's potential growth which has been hampered by the traffic pinch point at the Silverdale interchange. The new interchanges will tie into Ara Weiti Road and Duck's Creek Road as well as several entirely new roads. This will allow easier access to Stillwater and Karapiro Bay (Weiti Bay) and support future growth and subdivisions in the area.

The Penlink Weiti River Crossing is set to be a 535-metre-long, 45-metre-tall extradosed bridge and will be the first of its kind in New Zealand. The bridge will only have two piers in order to allow vessels to pass between in the centre of the river. On the southern side of the bridge, a pedestrian path and cycleway will allow for access over the river.

At the northern end of the route, the route connects to Whangaparaoa Road, where road users, pedestrians and cyclists will be able to proceed towards the Whangaparāoa town centre or turn back towards Red Beach.

=== Future Proposals ===
- Construction of an Auckland Transport-operated Whangaparaoa Bus Station at the northern end of the route.
- Construction of north-facing on and off ramps at the interchange with SH 1 reducing the requirement for northbound travelers to use the Silverdale interchange.
- Construction of a four-lane extension westward connecting the highway to Bawden Road and Dairy Flat Highway.
- Construction of an improved connection to East Coast Road.
- Construction of a second lane or bus lane in each direction along the route.

== History ==
=== Initial Proposals ===
Plans to bridge the Weiti River near Stillwater were first envisaged as early as the 1970s as a way to solve numerous transport issues connecting the Whangaparāoa Peninsula to Auckland City.

Following early property purchases in the 1990s, in 2001, the then-proposed toll-road was first designated in the district plan. Rodney District Council had the project starting in mid-2002 with an expected completion in 2005, having spent $1.53 million on reports and consents. The project was initially expected to cost between $65 million and $69.9 million, which included a provision to widen Whangaparāoa Road.

Prior to the 2008 election, the then Government promised to fund a toll-free joint Regional Fuel Tax (80%) and Council (20%) proposal. The proposal was expected to cost $183 million and begin in 2011. Following a Central Government election defeat, in 2009, the Rodney District Council, who had invested $18 million in land and $5 million in preliminary costs for the project, attempted to appeal to the new Government to continue to fund the two-lane proposal with a possible dynamic lane for rush hour traffic.

=== Auckland Transport Proposals ===
With the creation of the Auckland Supercity on 1 November 2010, the project was moved to Auckland Council and its transport entity Auckland Transport who, continued to propose its development.

In 2013, Auckland Transport upgraded the proposal to a four-lane, toll-road. Construction of the new road would start in 2015/2016 and be completed by 2018 at a cost of $243 million. This proposal did not, however, include a provision to widen the existing Whangaparāoa Road. At this point, a two-lane option was no longer considered adequate as it would not be able to support the planned urban growth in the area.

In 2016, a dynamic lane system was installed on an existing two-lane section of Whangaparāoa Road, on a trial basis but then made permanent as a means of reducing congestion on the road in the absence of Penlink and as a cheaper alternative to widening the road as had previously been planned.

By 2018 Penlink was downscaled back to a two-lane road without provision for a dynamic lane, cycle, bus or walking facilities despite protests from locals and politicians. The project was pushed back another two years and now expected to cost $348 million.

=== NZ Transport Agency Project ===
In the leadup to the 2020 election, it was announced by the then Government that it would fund the $411 million two-lane road through the New Zealand Upgrade Programme. Expected to start in 2021, the project was intended to be concluded by 2025. Locals expressed concern that the project had been kept as a two-lane highway, likening it to the Harbour Bridge, which had to be widened not long after construction to cope with traffic.

Following the election, the project was then transferred to the NZ Transport Agency, who announced in 2022 that an agreement had been made to construct a two-lane potentially-tolled highway for a substantially higher estimated $830 million, delaying the project's start with completion now not expected until 2026. Alongside the announcement of the project, Auckland Transport confirmed its intention to construct a bus station as part of the project, which would utilise the route to connect users to the CBD.

After many years of delays, changes to the project and cost increases, work finally began in late 2022 with an official sod-turning ceremony.

In October 2023, it was announced that Auckland Transport no longer had the funds to construct the bus station, and as such, it was cancelled.

It was later announced by the Government that the road would be tolled upon completion, contrary to official advice not to. The future (then opposition) Government announced that it would review the decision and consider whether it would be possible to widen the road back to four-lanes.

The project was expected to conclude in late 2026. However, delays in the construction of the Weiti River Bridge caused by the bridge design and environmental factors means only the road sections will be completed by 2026, with the remaining work expected to be completed 12 months later in 2027.
