= Whangaparāoa Peninsula =

Whangaparāoa Peninsula "Bay of Whales"
- Suburban area
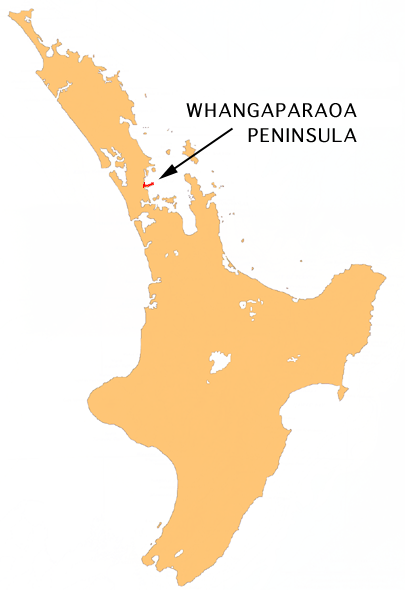
- Location of the Whangapāraoa Peninsula
- Coordinates: 36°38′S 174°46′E
- Country: New Zealand
- City: Auckland
- Local authority: Auckland Council
- Electoral ward: Albany Ward
- Local board: Hibiscus and Bays
- Electorate: Whangaparāoa; Te Tai Tokerau

Government
  - Territorial Authority: Auckland Council
  - Mayor of Auckland: Wayne Brown
  - Whangaparāoa MP: Mark Mitchell
  - Te Tai Tokerau MP: Mariameno Kapa-Kingi

Area
  - Total: 27.57 km^{2} (10.64 sq mi)

Population (June 2025)
  - Total: 38,680
  - Density: 1,403/km^{2} (3,634/sq mi)
- Time zone: UTC+12 (NZST)
  - Summer (DST): UTC+13 (NZDT)
- Website: www.whangaparaoa.info

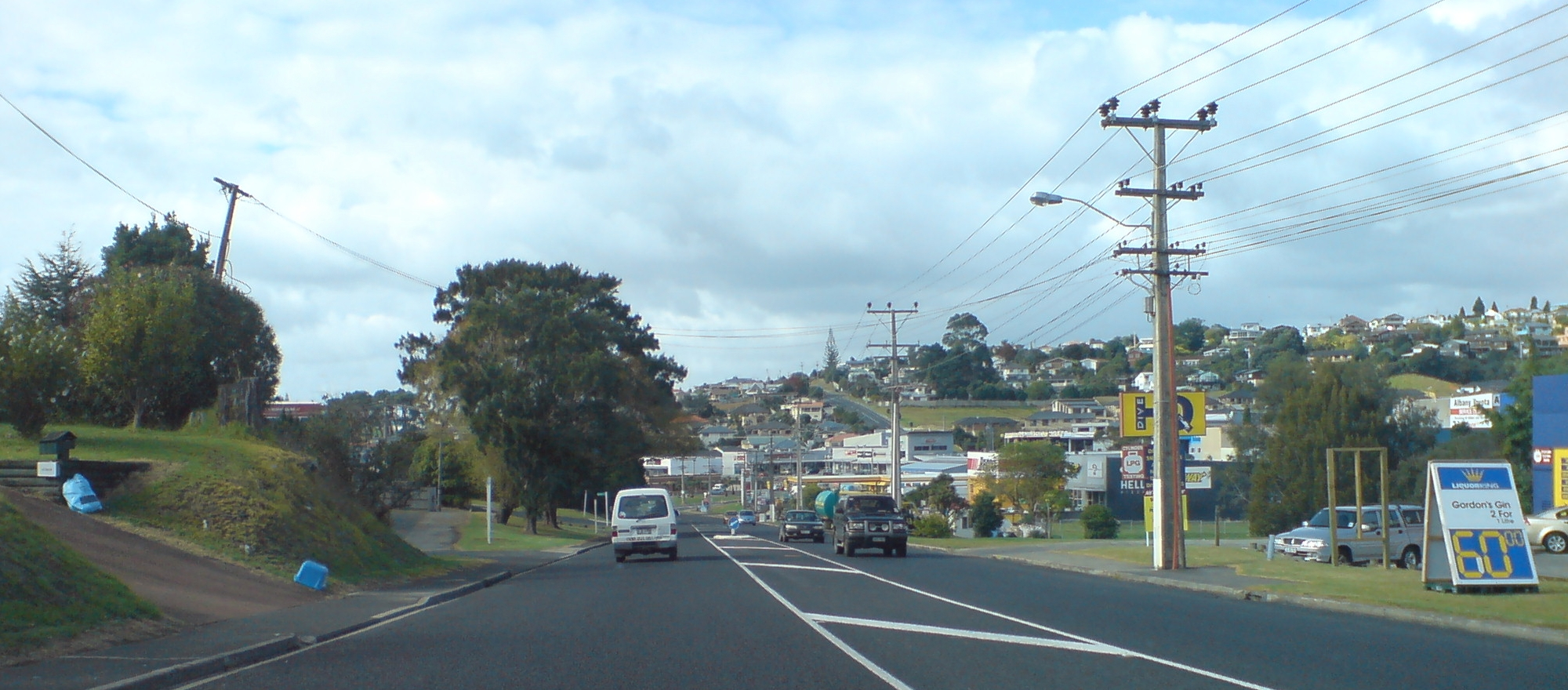
The peninsula has been heavily suburbanised in recent decades.

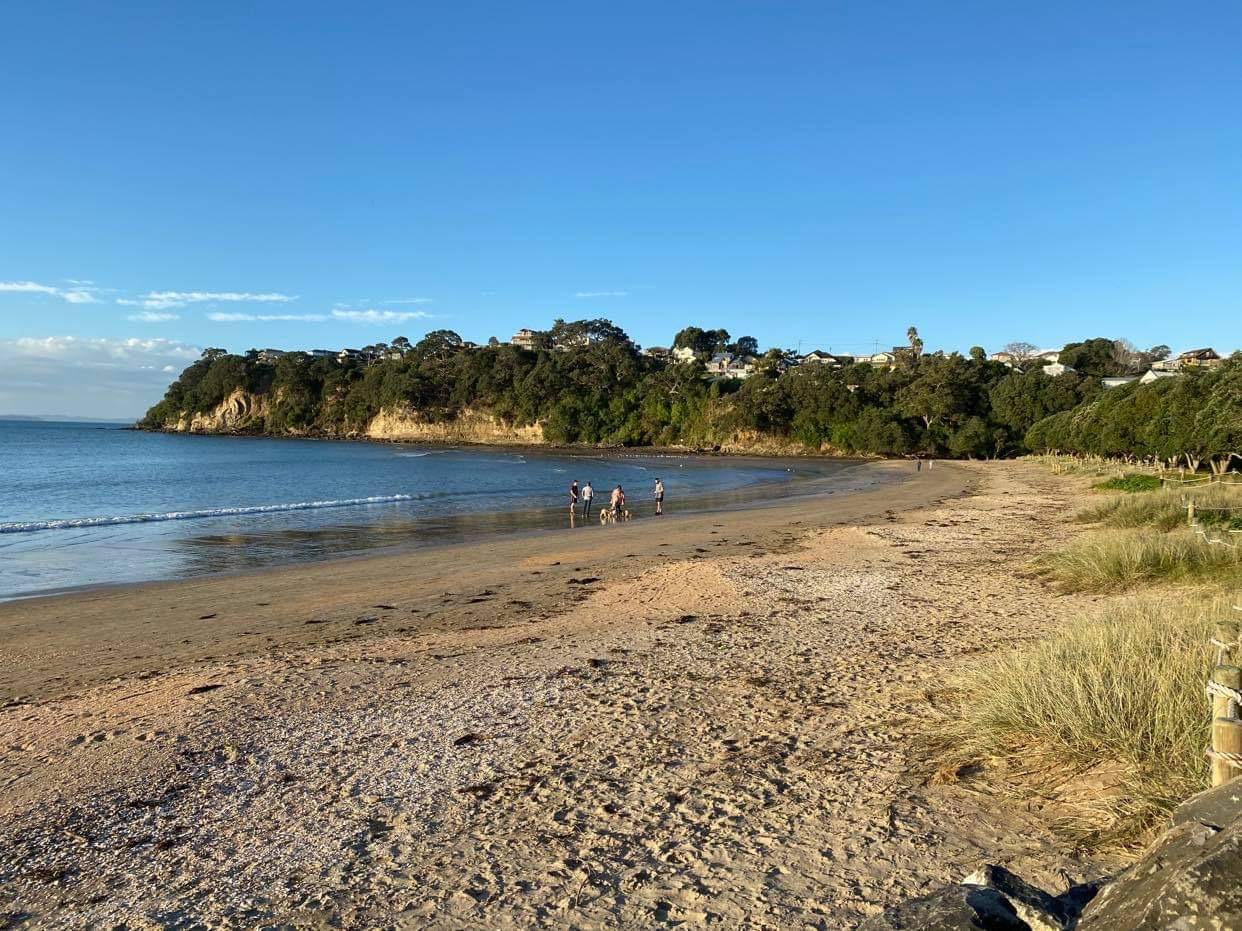
View of Stanmore Bay

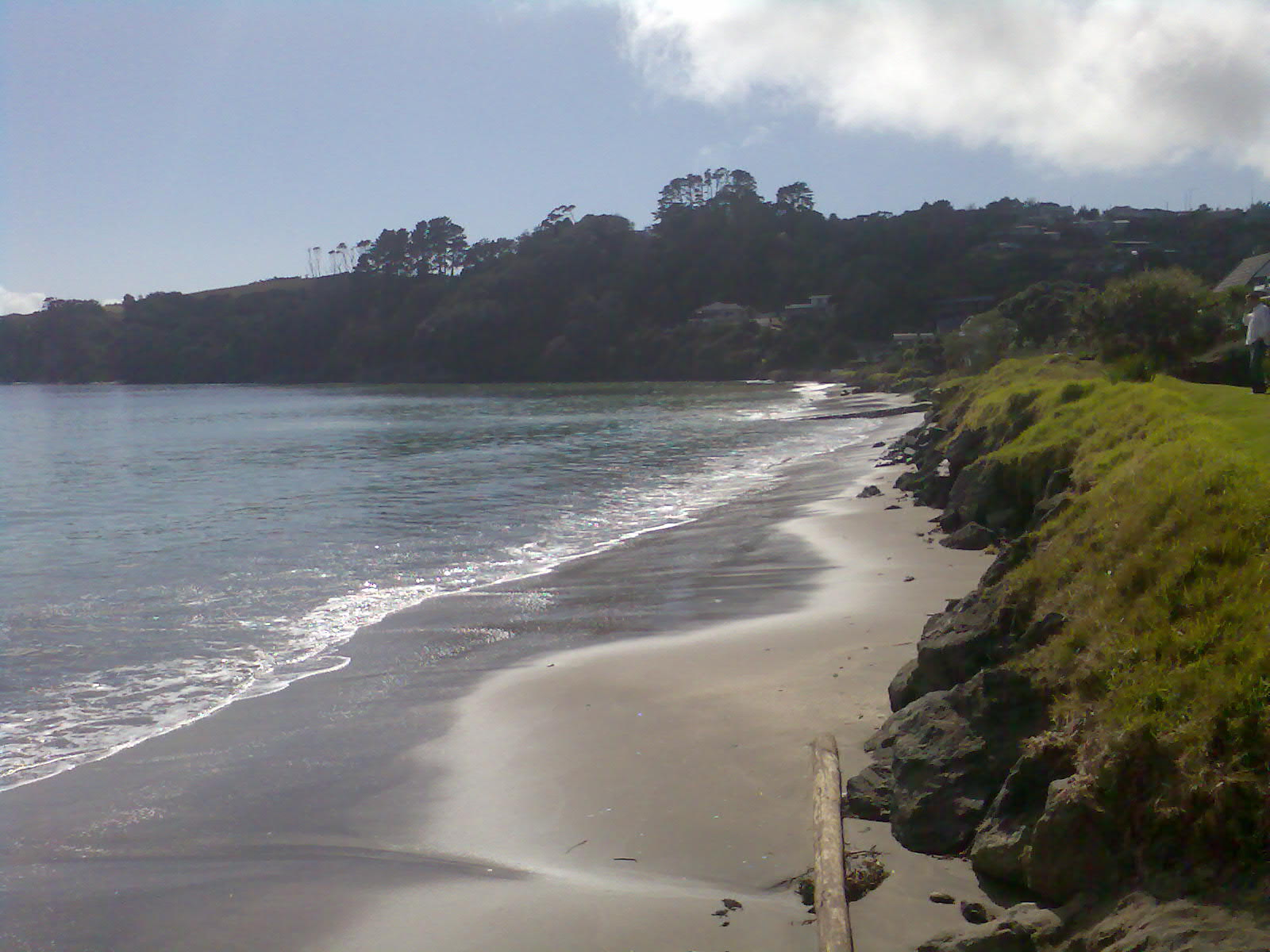
Tindalls Beach in late winter

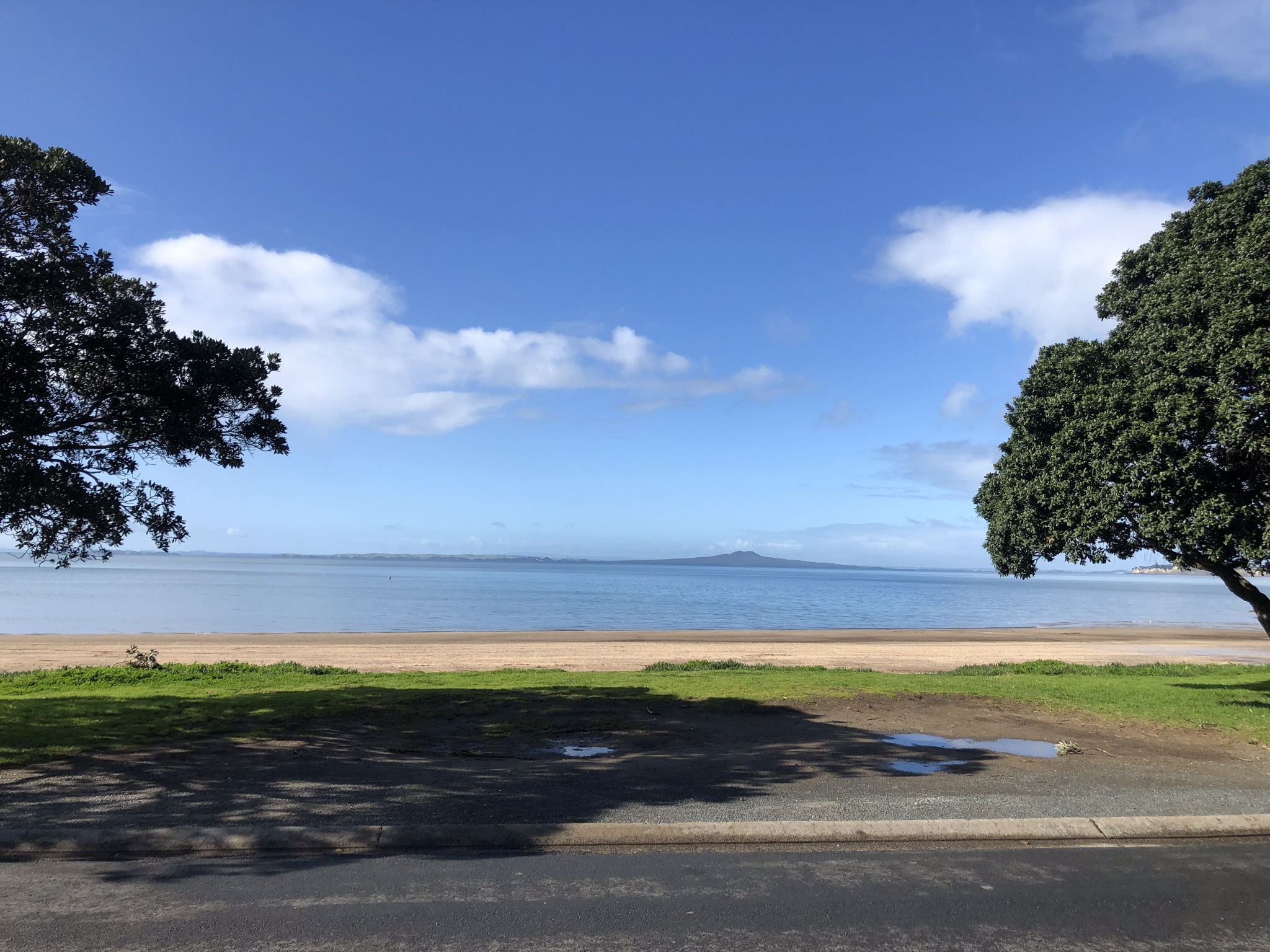
View of Arkles Bay

The Whangaparāoa Peninsula is a suburban area about 30–50 km north of Auckland, New Zealand. As of June 2025, it is home to 38,680 residents. The Peninsula stretches from Red Beach in the west, where it connects to Orewa and Silverdale, and extends to Army Bay in the east. It is part of the Hibiscus Coast and the Hauraki Gulf. There is one main road (Whangaparāoa Road) along its entire length, accessible from State Highway 1 via Hibiscus Coast Highway at Silverdale, or from Hibiscus Coast Highway at Orewa via Red Beach. Residents can commute to surrounding regions, including Auckland CBD, with the Gulf Harbour ferry at Gulf Harbour Marina, or by bus via the Hibiscus Coast Bus Station in Silverdale. Tourist attractions include Shakespear Regional Park and Tiritiri Matangi Island (4km off the coast), and numerous beaches. Community facilities include sport and recreation centres, a library, and public and private primary and secondary schools. The median age of the population is 38.1 years.

== History ==
The Kawerau hapū Ngāti Kahu traditionally inhabited the peninsula, prior to the arrival of Europeans. Ngāti Kahu's major focuses of settlement were around Te Haruhi Bay and Army Bay. A waka portage existed between Tindalls Beach and Matakatia, allowing travellers to bypass the Whangaparāoa Peninsula, who otherwise would have needed to travel around the entire peninsula.

Whangaparāoa Peninsula was purchased by the government in 1853, after which settlers began developing the land for grazing. Ngāti Kahu continued to live on the land until the 1890s. The Shakespear family acquired many of the landholdings, and farmed the area until 1967, when they sold their land to the Auckland Regional Council, who established the Shakespear Regional Park at the far end of the peninsula.

The Whangaparaoa Road District was formed and operational 31 October 1870 and dissolved in 1906.

== Geography ==
The peninsula is in the northern North Island, close to the base of the North Auckland Peninsula. The Māori language name Whangaparāoa means "Bay of Whales", and pods of orca and dolphin are regularly spotted in the waters off the peninsula. The peninsula is mostly urbanised and is in the Northern Auckland Zone of the Auckland urban area, as defined by Statistics New Zealand. Since 2010, it has been part of the Albany Ward and the Hibiscus and Bays Local Board of the Auckland Region. It is part of the General Electorate of Whangaparāoa.

A quickly growing area with new subdivisions being built, it is to be connected to State Highway 1 via a tolled bridge known as Penlink.

Auckland's Northern Motorway (State Highway One) was extended to Orewa at the end of the 1990s, reducing journey time into the city and making it more popular for commuters. The under construction Penlink road (including a bridge over the Weiti River from Stanmore Bay to Stillwater) will provide a quicker route between the peninsula and central Auckland.

The peninsula stretches east for 11 kilometres into the Hauraki Gulf, to the north of East Coast Bays. Tiritiri Matangi Island is three kilometres off its eastern tip.

Communities include Red Beach, Stanmore Bay, Manly, Tindalls Beach, Army Bay, Gulf Harbour, Matakatia, and Arkles Bay. At the end of the peninsula is Shakespear Regional Park.

The New Zealand Defence Force owns part of this area. The base has been used as a resettlement camp for refugees, such as in 2001 when 130 refugees lived there. In 2020 it was being used to quarantine New Zealanders who left Wuhan, China during the COVID-19 pandemic.

=== Climate ===
Whangaparāoa is a warm temperate oceanic climate (Cfb) on the Köppen Climate Classification System.

Climate data for Whangaparāoa, elevation 100 m (330 ft), (1991–2020 normals, extremes 1999–present)
Month	Jan	Feb	Mar	Apr	May	Jun	Jul	Aug	Sep	Oct	Nov	Dec	Year
Record high °C (°F)	30.6 (87.1)	30.5 (86.9)	27.6 (81.7)	26.2 (79.2)	22.7 (72.9)	21.4 (70.5)	19.4 (66.9)	20.4 (68.7)	22.2 (72.0)	24.0 (75.2)	26.4 (79.5)	27.7 (81.9)	30.6 (87.1)
Mean maximum °C (°F)	27.0 (80.6)	27.2 (81.0)	25.6 (78.1)	23.4 (74.1)	21.1 (70.0)	18.6 (65.5)	17.3 (63.1)	18.4 (65.1)	20.1 (68.2)	21.5 (70.7)	23.3 (73.9)	25.6 (78.1)	27.7 (81.9)
Mean daily maximum °C (°F)	23.6 (74.5)	24.1 (75.4)	22.5 (72.5)	20.2 (68.4)	17.6 (63.7)	15.3 (59.5)	14.4 (57.9)	15.0 (59.0)	16.4 (61.5)	18.0 (64.4)	19.6 (67.3)	21.8 (71.2)	19.0 (66.3)
Daily mean °C (°F)	19.8 (67.6)	20.5 (68.9)	19.2 (66.6)	17.2 (63.0)	14.9 (58.8)	12.8 (55.0)	11.8 (53.2)	12.1 (53.8)	13.2 (55.8)	14.6 (58.3)	16.0 (60.8)	18.2 (64.8)	15.9 (60.5)
Mean daily minimum °C (°F)	16.0 (60.8)	16.9 (62.4)	15.9 (60.6)	14.3 (57.7)	12.3 (54.1)	10.2 (50.4)	9.2 (48.6)	9.3 (48.7)	10.1 (50.2)	11.2 (52.2)	12.4 (54.3)	14.5 (58.1)	12.7 (54.8)
Mean minimum °C (°F)	12.6 (54.7)	13.8 (56.8)	12.6 (54.7)	10.3 (50.5)	8.1 (46.6)	6.6 (43.9)	5.5 (41.9)	6.1 (43.0)	6.4 (43.5)	7.7 (45.9)	8.9 (48.0)	10.9 (51.6)	4.7 (40.5)
Record low °C (°F)	10.5 (50.9)	11.4 (52.5)	9.7 (49.5)	7.5 (45.5)	4.0 (39.2)	4.1 (39.4)	3.4 (38.1)	2.3 (36.1)	4.6 (40.3)	5.9 (42.6)	7.0 (44.6)	7.4 (45.3)	2.3 (36.1)
Average rainfall mm (inches)	53.9 (2.12)	64.1 (2.52)	87.7 (3.45)	82.1 (3.23)	117.8 (4.64)	108.0 (4.25)	100.2 (3.94)	87.4 (3.44)	87.5 (3.44)	73.0 (2.87)	59.3 (2.33)	79.2 (3.12)	1,000.2 (39.35)
Source: NIWA

== Demographics ==
Whangaparāoa covers 27.57 km^{2} (10.64 sq mi) and had an estimated population of 38,680 as of June 2025, with a population density of 1,403 people per km^{2}.

Historical population
Year	Pop.	±% p.a.
2013	31,770	—
2018	35,565	+2.28%
2023	37,650	+1.15%

Whangaparāoa had a population of 37,650 in the 2023 New Zealand census, an increase of 2,085 people (5.9%) since the 2018 census, and an increase of 5,880 people (18.5%) since the 2013 census. There were 18,303 males, 19,215 females and 132 people of other genders in 13,977 dwellings. 2.7% of people identified as LGBTIQ+. There were 7,110 people (18.9%) aged under 15 years, 5,721 (15.2%) aged 15 to 29, 17,313 (46.0%) aged 30 to 64, and 7,506 (19.9%) aged 65 or older.

People could identify as more than one ethnicity. The results were 86.2% European (Pākehā); 9.5% Māori; 3.2% Pasifika; 10.3% Asian; 1.6% Middle Eastern, Latin American and African New Zealanders (MELAA); and 2.4% other, which includes people giving their ethnicity as "New Zealander". English was spoken by 96.6%, Māori language by 1.3%, Samoan by 0.2%, and other languages by 15.6%. No language could be spoken by 2.0% (e.g. too young to talk). New Zealand Sign Language was known by 0.3%. The percentage of people born overseas was 34.1, compared with 28.8% nationally.

Religious affiliations were 33.2% Christian, 1.2% Hindu, 0.5% Islam, 0.2% Māori religious beliefs, 0.7% Buddhist, 0.4% New Age, 0.1% Jewish, and 1.2% other religions. People who answered that they had no religion were 54.9%, and 7.7% of people did not answer the census question.

Of those at least 15 years old, 6,099 (20.0%) people had a bachelor's or higher degree, 15,720 (51.5%) had a post-high school certificate or diploma, and 6,789 (22.2%) people exclusively held high school qualifications. 5,091 people (16.7%) earned over $100,000 compared to 12.1% nationally. The employment status of those at least 15 was that 15,573 (51.0%) people were employed full-time, 4,290 (14.0%) were part-time, and 597 (2.0%) were unemployed.

Individual SA3 statistical areas
Name	Area (km^{2})	Population	Density (per km^{2})	Dwellings	Median age	Median income
Red Beach	4.31	9,546	2,215	3,525	44.0 years	$42,800
Stanmore Bay	5.74	10,770	1,876	3,975	38.1 years	$47,200
Wade Heads-Arkles Bay	1.66	1,998	1,204	714	43.8 years	$50,700
Manly	2.61	5,928	2,271	2,298	44.6 years	$43,400
Tindalls-Matakatia	2.93	1,938	661	729	49.6 years	$43,200
Gulf Harbour	4.10	5,988	1,460	2,190	42.2 years	$47,300
Army Bay	6.22	1,482	238	546	46.7 years	$41,500
New Zealand					38.1 years	$41,500

== Economy ==
=== Whangaparāoa Town Centre and Coast Plaza ===
In the past twenty years the township has developed on the high land above Stanmore Bay, including a shopping centre (Coast Plaza), a movie theatre, a bowling alley, a library and community centre.

Coast Plaza has 350 carparks, and is anchored by Countdown.

=== Stanmore Bay Shopping Complex ===
The Stanmore Bay shopping complex opened in 2015, replacing the previous complex. The new centre includes 16 retail spaces and is anchored by New World When completed, the Stanmore Shopping complex will mark the end of the Penlink motorway connection.

=== Manly Village ===
The Manly Village is home to many of the coast's restaurants and shops. Plans were lodged for upgrades to part of the complex in 2017 which would have increased retail spaces and added more apartments but have not progressed.

=== Gulf Harbour Marina, shops and restaurants ===
Opening in the late 1980s the Gulf Harbour Marina is home to a variety of boat maintenance services, and retail. The marina provides for vessels up to 55 metres and has in excess of 1050 berths.

== Sport ==
The peninsula is home to the Silverdale Seahawks rugby union and also Hibiscus Coast Raiders rugby league, that are a part of Auckland Rugby League and compete in the Fox Memorial Championship. The peninsula is also home to football (soccer) club Hibiscus Coast AFC, which competes in the Lotto Sport Italia NRFL Division 2. Whangaparāoa has one open (Whangaparāoa Golf Club) and one closed (as of 20 July 2023) (closed ) golf club (Gulf Harbour Country Club).

== Transportation ==
Hibiscus Coast is served by Auckland Transport bus routes operated by AT Metro to destinations including Hibiscus Coast Bus Station and central Auckland. Commuter ferries operated by Auckland Transport and Fullers360 run between Gulf Harbour and central Auckland on week days. Tourism services operate from Auckland City via Gulf Harbour to Tiritiri Matangi Island on select days.

== Education ==
- Whangaparāoa College is a co-educational secondary (years 7–13) state school with a roll of 1843 students as of September 2025. It opened in 2005.
- Wentworth College is a co-educational secondary (years 7–13) private school with a roll of 458 students as of September 2025. It opened in 2003. They offer the Cambridge curriculum.
- Wentworth Primary is a co-educational primary (years 1–6) private school with a roll of 160 students as of September 2025. It opened in 2009.They offer the Cambridge curriculum.
- Whangaparāoa School is a co-educational contributing primary (years 1–6) state school with a roll of 847 students as of September 2025.
- Stanmore Bay School is a co-educational contributing primary (years 1–6) state school with a roll of 521 students as of September 2025. It opened in 1979. It is known for sports and arts programmes.
- Gulf Harbour School is a co-educational contributing primary (years 1–6) state school with a roll of 559 students as of September 2025. It was founded in the 2000s.
- Red Beach School is a co-educational contributing primary (years 1–6) state school with a roll of 483 students as of September 2025. It opened in 1989.
- KingsWay School is a co-educational composite (years 1–13) christian state-integrated school with a roll of 2043 students. The school has 2 campuses which are located at the border of the Whangaparāoa Peninsula. The senior campus (years 7–13) is located in Red Beach. The primary campus (years 1–6) is located in Silverdale.

== Notable people ==
Notable people that were born or live/lived on the Whangaparāoa Peninsula include:

- Janet Frame (1924–2004), author. Frame lived at Whangaparāoa adjacent to Shakespear Regional Park in the 1970s.
- Russell Coutts (born 1962), international sailing champion. Coutts lives on the Whangaparaoa peninsula, where he is president of the Manly Sailing Club and has started the Russell Coutts Sailing Foundation.
- Scott Beard (born 1960s), Detective Inspector with New Zealand Police. Beard is nationally known for leading the investigation of the murder of Grace Millane and other high profile cases. He has lived on the Hibiscus Coast since the mid-1990s.
- Stu Duval, artist and writer. Duval lives in Army Bay.

== See also ==
- Shakespear Regional Park
- Gulf Harbour
- Whangaparāoa (New Zealand electorate)
