= Army Bay =

- Suburb
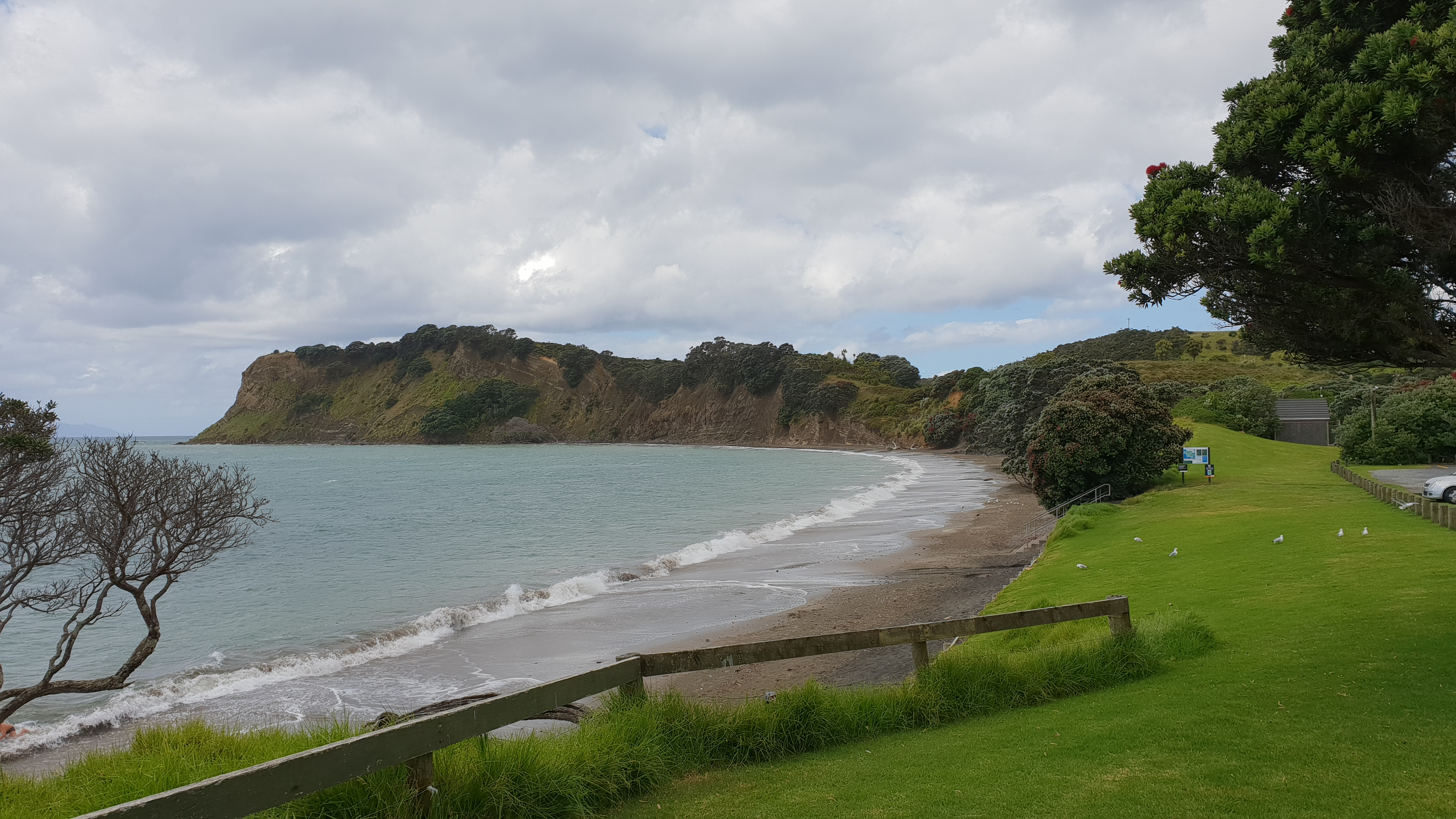
- Army Bay beach
- Interactive map of Army Bay
- Coordinates: 36.604°S 174.802°E
- Country: New Zealand
- City: Auckland
- Local authority: Auckland Council
- Electoral ward: Albany ward
- Local board: Hibiscus and Bays

Area
  - Land: 622 ha (1,540 acres)

Population (June 2025)
  - Total: 1,460
  - Density: 235/km^{2} (608/sq mi)

(Coal Mine Bay)	(Whangaparaoa Bay)
	Army Bay	Shakespear Regional Park
Gulf Harbour	Gulf Harbour	(Okoromai Bay)

Army Bay is a northern coastal suburb of Auckland, New Zealand. It is on the Whangaparāoa Peninsula about 47 kilometres (by road) north of the city centre. It is named for the New Zealand Defence Force area north of Shakespear Regional Park. The military area was used to quarantine New Zealanders and Pacific Islanders evacuated from Wuhan during the COVID-19 pandemic in February 2020.

== Demographics ==
Army Bay covers 6.22 km^{2} (2.40 sq mi) and had an estimated population of 1,460 as of June 2025, with a population density of 235 people per km^{2}.

Historical population
Year	Pop.	±% p.a.
2006	1,284	—
2013	1,410	+1.35%
2018	1,566	+2.12%
2023	1,482	−1.10%

Army Bay had a population of 1,482 in the 2023 New Zealand census, a decrease of 84 people (−5.4%) since the 2018 census, and an increase of 72 people (5.1%) since the 2013 census. There were 720 males, 759 females and 3 people of other genders in 546 dwellings. 2.6% of people identified as LGBTIQ+. The median age was 46.7 years (compared with 38.1 years nationally). There were 264 people (17.8%) aged under 15 years, 195 (13.2%) aged 15 to 29, 702 (47.4%) aged 30 to 64, and 318 (21.5%) aged 65 or older.

People could identify as more than one ethnicity. The results were 89.3% European (Pākehā); 9.3% Māori; 5.1% Pasifika; 6.5% Asian; 2.2% Middle Eastern, Latin American and African New Zealanders (MELAA); and 1.2% other, which includes people giving their ethnicity as "New Zealander". English was spoken by 97.6%, Māori language by 1.2%, Samoan by 0.4%, and other languages by 13.8%. No language could be spoken by 1.8% (e.g. too young to talk). New Zealand Sign Language was known by 0.4%. The percentage of people born overseas was 37.0, compared with 28.8% nationally.

Religious affiliations were 30.8% Christian, 0.4% Hindu, 0.4% Islam, 0.4% Māori religious beliefs, 0.6% Buddhist, 0.6% New Age, 0.2% Jewish, and 0.6% other religions. People who answered that they had no religion were 58.7%, and 7.1% of people did not answer the census question.

Of those at least 15 years old, 249 (20.4%) people had a bachelor's or higher degree, 621 (51.0%) had a post-high school certificate or diploma, and 252 (20.7%) people exclusively held high school qualifications. The median income was $41,500, compared with $41,500 nationally. 195 people (16.0%) earned over $100,000 compared to 12.1% nationally. The employment status of those at least 15 was that 591 (48.5%) people were employed full-time, 174 (14.3%) were part-time, and 24 (2.0%) were unemployed.
