= Gulf Harbour =

- Suburb
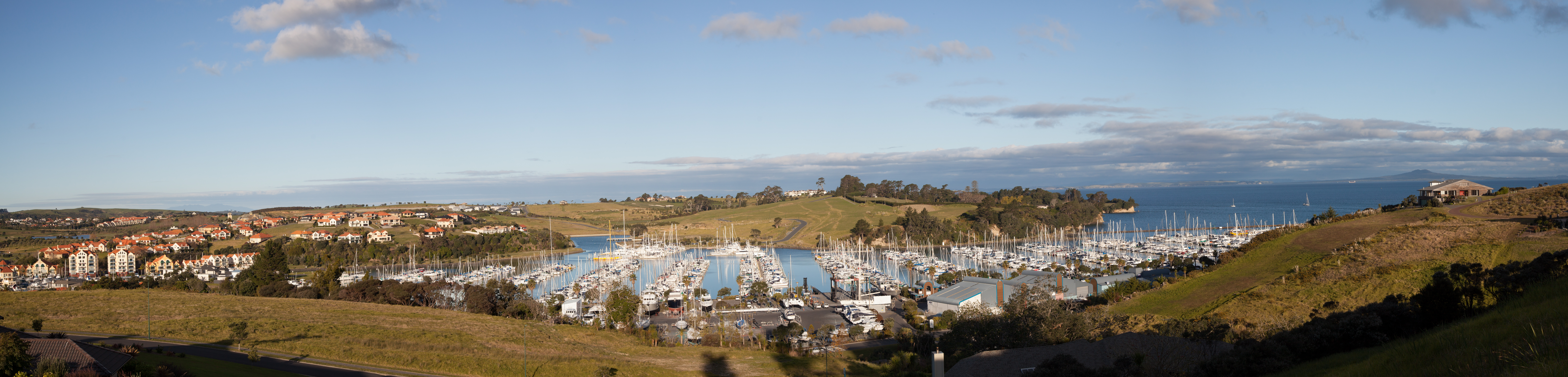
- Gulf Harbour panorama
- Interactive map of Gulf Harbour
- Coordinates: 36.614°S 174.791°E
- Country: New Zealand
- City: Auckland
- Local authority: Auckland Council
- Electoral ward: Albany ward
- Local board: Hibiscus and Bays

Area
  - Land: 410 ha (1,000 acres)

Population (June 2025)
  - Total: 6,210
  - Density: 1,500/km^{2} (3,900/sq mi)

	(Whangaparaoa Bay)	Army Bay
Tindalls Beach	Gulf Harbour	Okoromai Bay
Matakatia	(Hauraki Gulf)

Gulf Harbour is a suburb development some 4 km from the end of the Whangaparāoa Peninsula, and 7 km from Whangaparaoa Town Centre, towards the northern end of Auckland, New Zealand. It has one of the country's largest marinas, and had, until 2023, one of the country's top golf courses and used to be regarded as a retreat for Auckland's well-off. The site is sometimes also known as Hobbs Bay and was sold in the early seventies by landowners, the Hobbs family, who still retain some of the coastal area including the Hobbs Bay beach.

A limited ferry service operates between Gulf Harbour and downtown Auckland.

== Demographics ==
Gulf Harbour covers 4.10 km^{2} (1.58 sq mi) and had an estimated population of 6,210 as of June 2025, with a population density of 1,515 people per km^{2}.

Historical population
Year	Pop.	±% p.a.
2006	3,294	—
2013	4,305	+3.90%
2018	5,601	+5.40%
2023	5,988	+1.35%

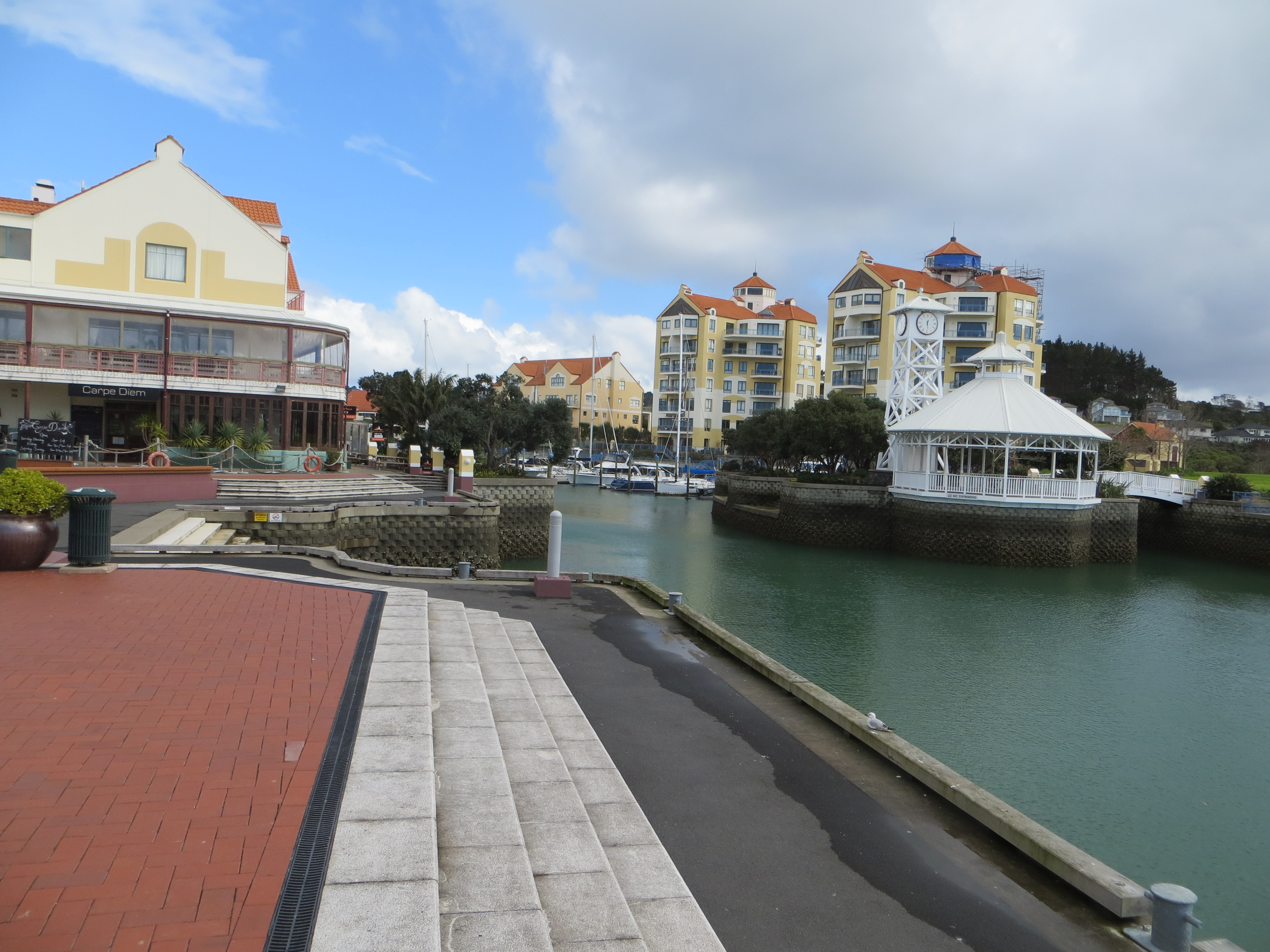
View from the east at head of the harbour 2014

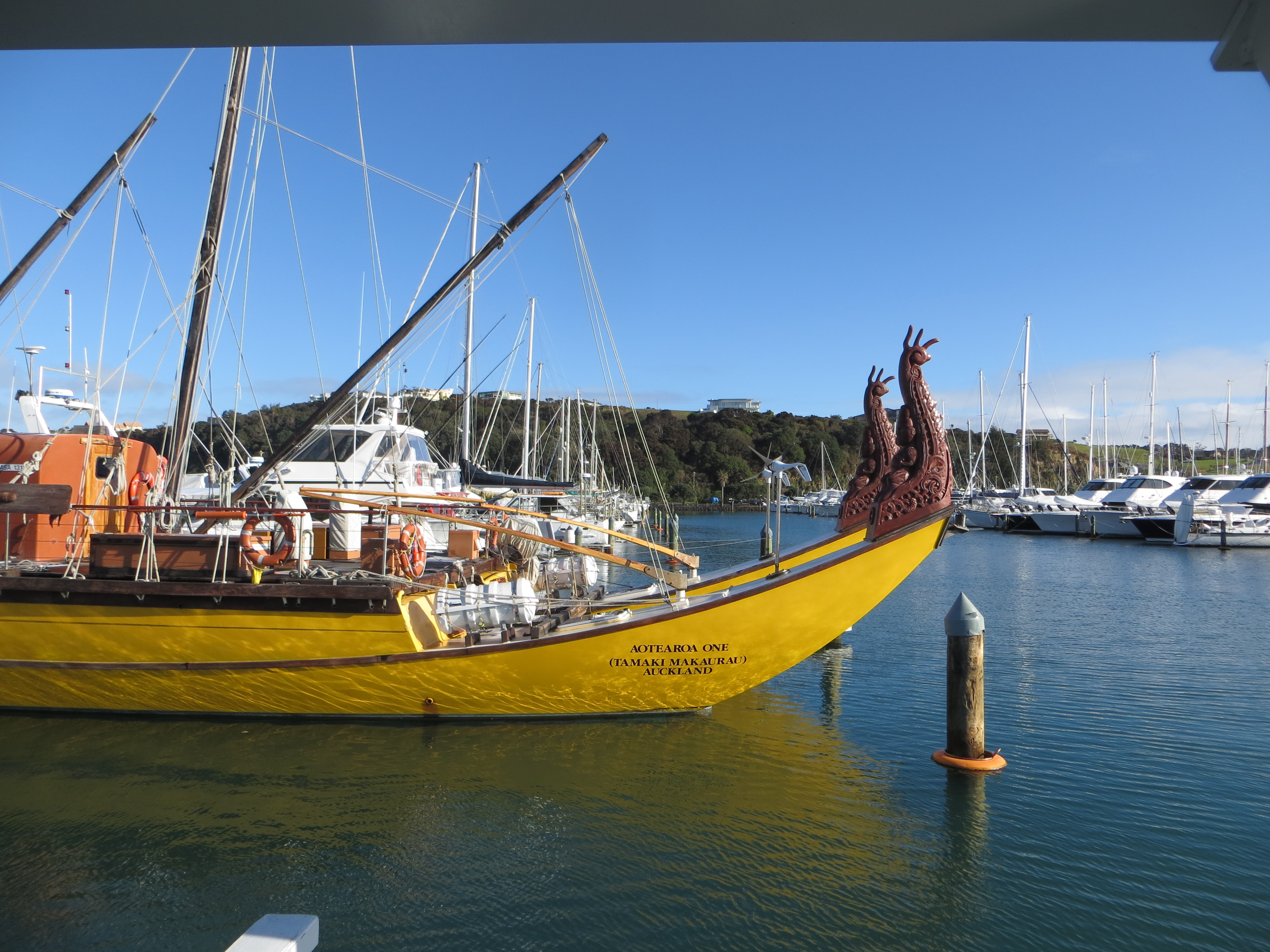
view of the marina from the passenger ferry jetty 2014

Gulf Harbour had a population of 5,988 in the 2023 New Zealand census, an increase of 387 people (6.9%) since the 2018 census, and an increase of 1,683 people (39.1%) since the 2013 census. There were 2,973 males, 3,003 females and 12 people of other genders in 2,190 dwellings. 2.6% of people identified as LGBTIQ+. The median age was 42.2 years (compared with 38.1 years nationally). There were 1,197 people (20.0%) aged under 15 years, 789 (13.2%) aged 15 to 29, 2,868 (47.9%) aged 30 to 64, and 1,131 (18.9%) aged 65 or older.

People could identify as more than one ethnicity. The results were 82.1% European (Pākehā); 6.7% Māori; 2.5% Pasifika; 15.5% Asian; 2.1% Middle Eastern, Latin American and African New Zealanders (MELAA); and 3.1% other, which includes people giving their ethnicity as "New Zealander". English was spoken by 95.8%, Māori language by 1.1%, Samoan by 0.2%, and other languages by 22.8%. No language could be spoken by 1.9% (e.g. too young to talk). New Zealand Sign Language was known by 0.4%. The percentage of people born overseas was 46.6, compared with 28.8% nationally.

Religious affiliations were 34.5% Christian, 1.7% Hindu, 0.9% Islam, 0.1% Māori religious beliefs, 0.9% Buddhist, 0.4% New Age, 0.2% Jewish, and 1.4% other religions. People who answered that they had no religion were 51.4%, and 8.8% of people did not answer the census question.

Of those at least 15 years old, 1,050 (21.9%) people had a bachelor's or higher degree, 2,316 (48.3%) had a post-high school certificate or diploma, and 1,113 (23.2%) people exclusively held high school qualifications. The median income was $47,300, compared with $41,500 nationally. 879 people (18.3%) earned over $100,000 compared to 12.1% nationally. The employment status of those at least 15 was that 2,457 (51.3%) people were employed full-time, 630 (13.1%) were part-time, and 93 (1.9%) were unemployed.

Individual statistical areas
Name	Area (km^{2})	Population	Density (per km^{2})	Dwellings	Median age	Median income
Gulf Harbour North	1.76	2,976	1,691	993	39.7 years	$49,800
Gulf Harbour South	2.34	3,015	1,288	1,197	44.3 years	$45,200
New Zealand					38.1 years	$41,500

== Education ==
Gulf Harbour School is a decile 10 primary school (years 1–6) school with a roll of 534 students.

Wentworth College is a secondary (years 7–13) school with a roll of 433 students. It is a private school which opened in 2003. Wentworth Primary School is a private primary school which opened in February 2008 on the same site. It has a roll of 155 students.

All three schools are coeducational. Rolls are as of July 2025.

The closest public high school to Gulf Harbour is Whangaparaoa College.
