= Silverdale, Auckland =

Silverdale
- Suburb
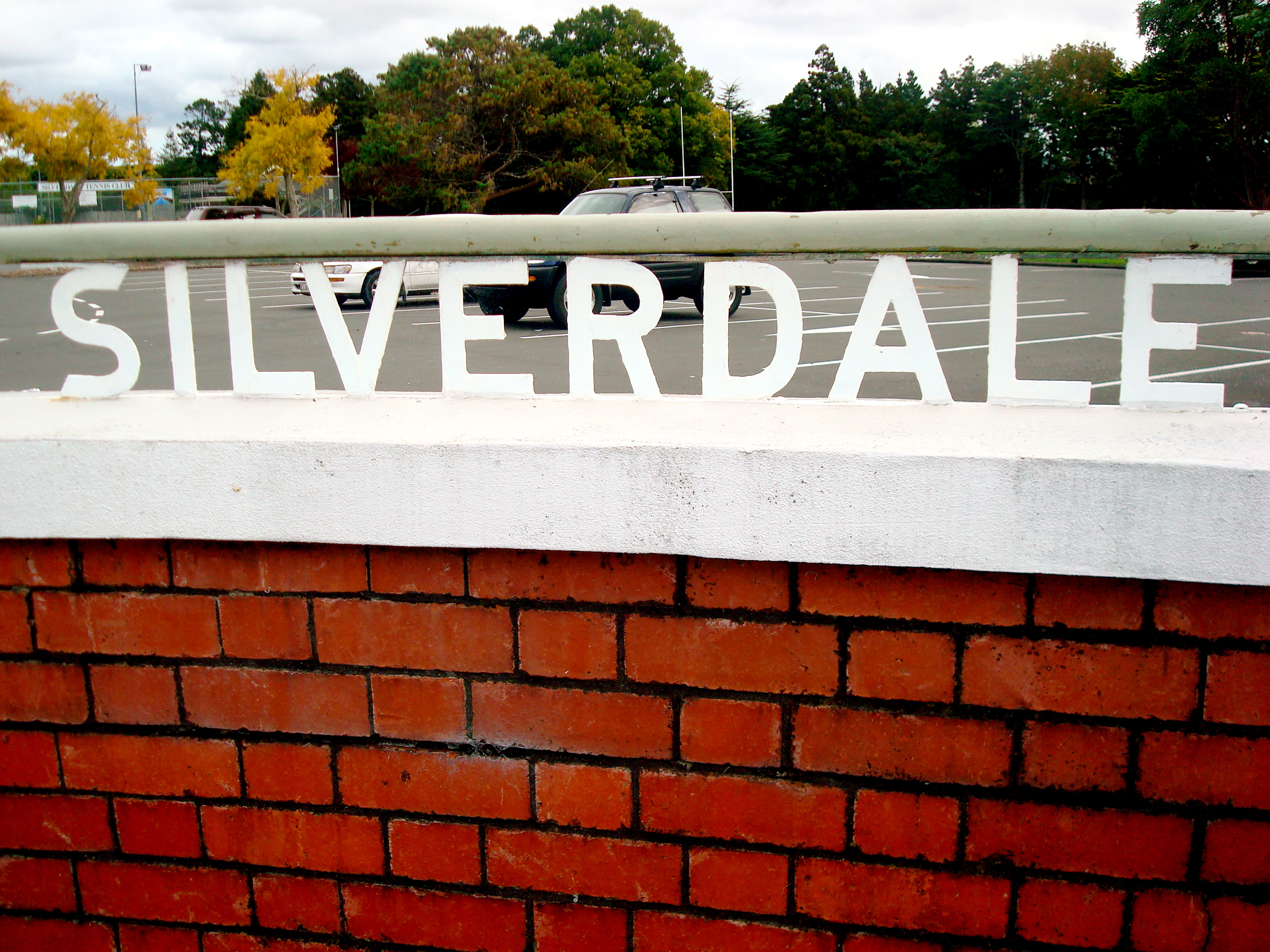
- Silverdale War Memorial
- Interactive map of Silverdale
- Coordinates: 36.6166642°S 174.666664°E
- Country: New Zealand
- City: Auckland
- Local authority: Auckland Council
- Electoral ward: Albany ward
- Local board: Hibiscus and Bays
- Established: 1968

Area
  - Land: 1,377 ha (3,400 acres)

Population (June 2025)
  - Total: 2,760
  - Density: 200/km^{2} (519/sq mi)
- Postcode: 0932

Waiwera	Orewa	Millwater
Wainui	Silverdale	Red Beach
Dairy Flat	Dairy Flat	Stanmore Bay

Silverdale is a village approximately 30 km north of Auckland in the North Island of New Zealand. It is located on the north bank of the Weiti River and lies to the west of the Whangaparāoa Peninsula.

State Highway 1 passes to the west of the village via the Northern Motorway. The former route of State Highway 1 runs south-west to north-east through the village. This route was redesignated State Highway 17 before being redesignated Hibiscus Coast Highway (part of Urban Route 31). This passes through Orewa and Waiwera before joining State Highway 1 at the termination of the motorway south of Puhoi.

Hibiscus Coast busway station is the northernmost station participating in the Northern Busway. It is located on the Hibiscus Coast Highway a few hundred metres south-west of Silverdale.

== History ==
The township was established under the name Wade (a corruption of Weiti) but renamed Silverdale in 1911 because of the many poplar trees in the area at the time and because it is situated in a dale. The historic areas of Silverdale feature a number of 19th century buildings from when the township was established, including the Holy Trinity Anglican Church from 1885, and the Methodist Parsonage, built in 1887. The Wesleyan church was built in Parnell in the mid-1840s, and transported to Silverdale by sea c. 1856.

== Demographics ==
Silverdale covers 13.77 km^{2} (5.32 sq mi) and had an estimated population of 2,760 as of June 2025, with a population density of 200 people per km^{2}.

Historical population
Year	Pop.	±% p.a.
2006	1,824	—
2013	1,272	−5.02%
2018	1,365	+1.42%
2023	2,043	+8.40%
The 2006 population is for an area of 13.55 km^{2}, which included Stillwater. Source:

Silverdale had a population of 2,043 in the 2023 New Zealand census, an increase of 678 people (49.7%) since the 2018 census, and an increase of 771 people (60.6%) since the 2013 census. There were 1,035 males, 1,002 females and 3 people of other genders in 636 dwellings. 3.2% of people identified as LGBTIQ+. There were 402 people (19.7%) aged under 15 years, 396 (19.4%) aged 15 to 29, 969 (47.4%) aged 30 to 64, and 276 (13.5%) aged 65 or older.

People could identify as more than one ethnicity. The results were 69.8% European (Pākehā); 8.5% Māori; 2.8% Pasifika; 23.3% Asian; 3.1% Middle Eastern, Latin American and African New Zealanders (MELAA); and 2.3% other, which includes people giving their ethnicity as "New Zealander". English was spoken by 93.5%, Māori language by 1.2%, Samoan by 0.3%, and other languages by 23.9%. No language could be spoken by 2.3% (e.g. too young to talk). New Zealand Sign Language was known by 0.1%. The percentage of people born overseas was 42.1, compared with 28.8% nationally.

Religious affiliations were 33.8% Christian, 1.9% Hindu, 1.8% Islam, 1.3% Buddhist, 0.3% New Age, and 1.2% other religions. People who answered that they had no religion were 53.0%, and 6.8% of people did not answer the census question.

Of those at least 15 years old, 336 (20.5%) people had a bachelor's or higher degree, 807 (49.2%) had a post-high school certificate or diploma, and 411 (25.0%) people exclusively held high school qualifications. 258 people (15.7%) earned over $100,000 compared to 12.1% nationally. The employment status of those at least 15 was that 873 (53.2%) people were employed full-time, 279 (17.0%) were part-time, and 36 (2.2%) were unemployed.

Individual statistical areas
Name	Area (km^{2})	Population	Density (per km^{2})	Dwellings	Median age	Median income
Silverdale Central	3.36	900	268	279	34.3 years	$43,200
Silverdale South	10.41	1,143	110	357	43.1 years	$44,200
New Zealand					38.1 years	$41,500

== Education ==
Silverdale Primary School is a contributing primary (years 1–6) school with a roll of 663 students as at July 2025. The school was founded in 1869 and moved to its current site at the end of 2006.

Stella Maris Primary School is a state integrated full primary (years 1–8) school with a roll of 338 students as at July 2025. The Catholic school opened at the beginning of 2005.

Both schools are coeducational.
