= Red Beach, New Zealand =

Red Beach
- Suburb
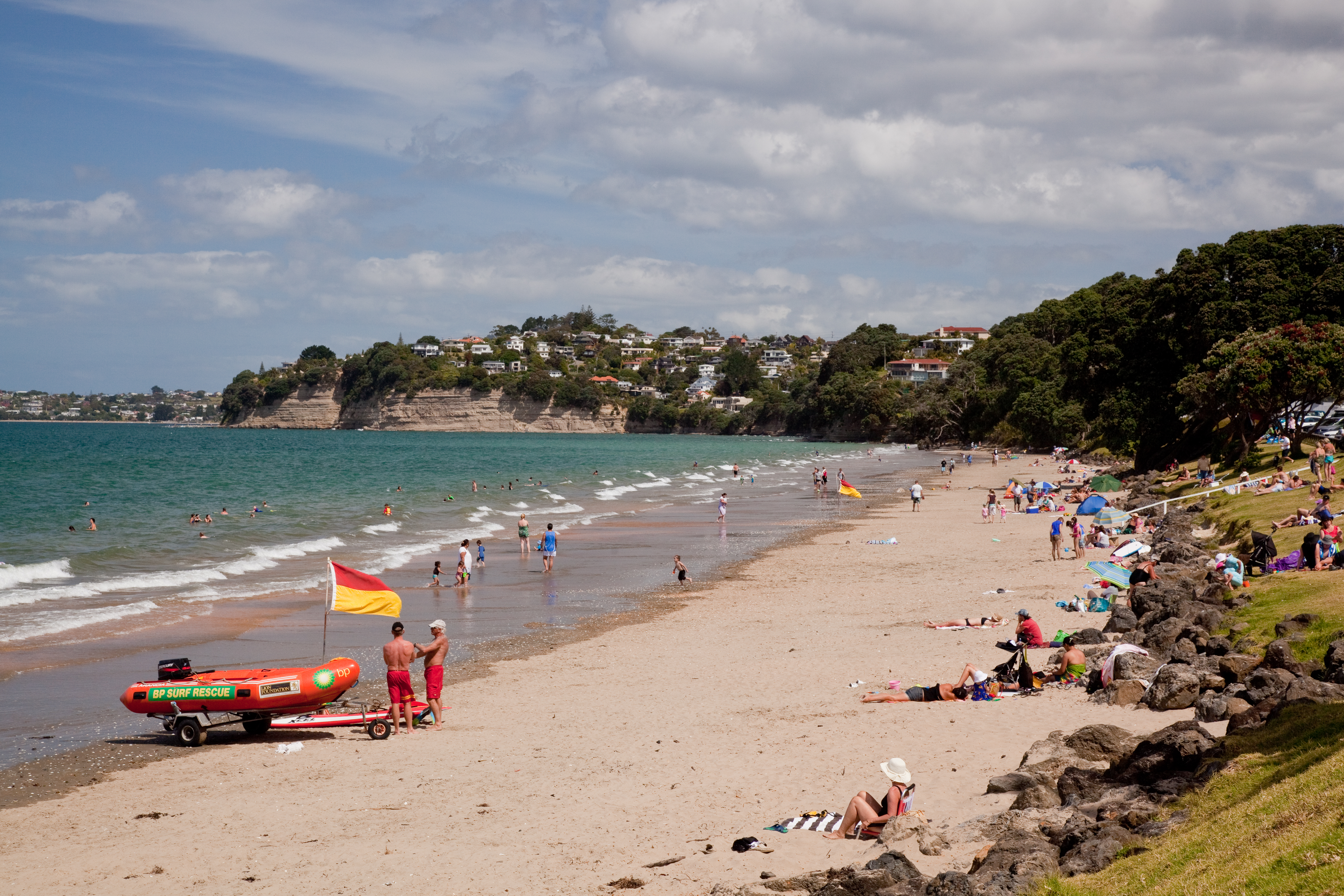
- Red Beach in 2010
- Interactive map of Red Beach
- Coordinates: 36.606°S 174.698°E
- Country: New Zealand
- City: Auckland
- Local authority: Auckland Council
- Electoral ward: Albany ward
- Local board: Hibiscus and Bays

Area
  - Land: 431 ha (1,070 acres)

Population (June 2025)
  - Total: 9,820
  - Density: 2,280/km^{2} (5,900/sq mi)
- Postcode: 0932

(Orewa River)	Orewa
Millwater	Red Beach	(Whangaparaoa Bay)
Silverdale	(Weiti River)	Stanmore Bay

Red Beach is a suburb surrounding the beach of the same name on the Hibiscus Coast, Auckland, New Zealand, at the base of the Whangaparāoa Peninsula. The suburb of Silverdale is to the south-west, and Orewa to the north.

== Geography ==
The beach is on the Hauraki Gulf and the suburb is bounded by two estuaries, that of the Weiti River to the south and the Ōrewa River to the north. The beach is named for its reddish colour. The sand is light brownish-grey in colour and its "red" colour is due to fragments of dark orange-brown, iron-stained, fossil shell. The majority of the iron-stained shells consists of highly fragmented bivalve shells, which are less than 2 cm (0.79 in) across.

The Hibiscus Coast Highway runs through the suburb. This was previously State Highway 1 and then State Highway 17. The majority of highway traffic now travels along the Northern Motorway inland instead, as the motorway was redesignated as State Highway 1 when an extension was completed in 2009. All road access to the rest of Whangaparāoa Peninsula currently runs through the suburb.

== History ==
Red Beach was named after the red shells found along the beach.

The 44 hectare Peninsula Golf Course, established in 1956, was rezoned for residential development in 2013, despite local opposition and Fletcher Living gained resource consent to build 520 houses on the site in December 2014.

== Demographics ==
Red Beach covers 4.31 km^{2} (1.66 sq mi) and had an estimated population of 9,820 as of June 2025, with a population density of 2,278 people per km^{2}.

Historical population
Year	Pop.	±% p.a.
2006	6,423	—
2013	7,554	+2.34%
2018	8,349	+2.02%
2023	9,546	+2.72%

Red Beach had a population of 9,546 in the 2023 New Zealand census, an increase of 1,197 people (14.3%) since the 2018 census, and an increase of 1,992 people (26.4%) since the 2013 census. There were 4,569 males, 4,959 females and 21 people of other genders in 3,525 dwellings. 2.5% of people identified as LGBTIQ+. The median age was 44.0 years (compared with 38.1 years nationally). There were 1,713 people (17.9%) aged under 15 years, 1,470 (15.4%) aged 15 to 29, 4,113 (43.1%) aged 30 to 64, and 2,250 (23.6%) aged 65 or older.

People could identify as more than one ethnicity. The results were 85.7% European (Pākehā); 8.1% Māori; 2.8% Pasifika; 11.0% Asian; 1.6% Middle Eastern, Latin American and African New Zealanders (MELAA); and 2.4% other, which includes people giving their ethnicity as "New Zealander". English was spoken by 96.4%, Māori language by 1.1%, Samoan by 0.2%, and other languages by 15.6%. No language could be spoken by 2.0% (e.g. too young to talk). New Zealand Sign Language was known by 0.4%. The percentage of people born overseas was 32.5, compared with 28.8% nationally.

Religious affiliations were 37.9% Christian, 1.2% Hindu, 0.4% Islam, 0.2% Māori religious beliefs, 0.9% Buddhist, 0.3% New Age, 0.1% Jewish, and 0.9% other religions. People who answered that they had no religion were 51.3%, and 7.1% of people did not answer the census question.

Of those at least 15 years old, 1,611 (20.6%) people had a bachelor's or higher degree, 3,957 (50.5%) had a post-high school certificate or diploma, and 1,761 (22.5%) people exclusively held high school qualifications. The median income was $42,800, compared with $41,500 nationally. 1,320 people (16.9%) earned over $100,000 compared to 12.1% nationally. The employment status of those at least 15 was that 3,828 (48.9%) people were employed full-time, 1,086 (13.9%) were part-time, and 114 (1.5%) were unemployed.

Individual statistical areas
Name	Area (km^{2})	Population	Density (per km^{2})	Dwellings	Median age	Median income
Kingsway	0.90	2,346	2,607	777	39.4 years	$49,600
Red Beach West	1.84	3,210	1,745	1,212	44.9 years	$38,100
Red Beach East	1.56	3,987	2,556	1,533	47.1 years	$43,500
New Zealand					38.1 years	$41,500

== Landmarks and attractions ==
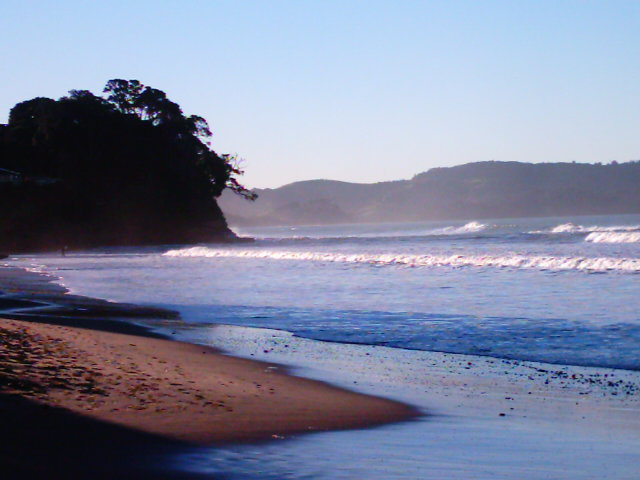
Surf at Red Beach

Popular attractions include:

- The Red Beach Surf Club
- Totara Views
- William Bayes play ground
- Red Beach Shops

== Annual events ==
- Red Beach School Gala
- Streetlight Competition

== Education ==
Red Beach School is a contributing primary (years 1–6) school with a roll of 458 students. The school opened in 1989 covering years 1–8, but reduced its age range when Hibiscus Coast Intermediate opened in 1997 (the intermediate later became part of Whangaparaoa College).

KingsWay School is a state integrated composite (years 1–13) school with a roll of 2008 students. The school provides a non-denominational Christian-based education.

Both schools are coeducational. Rolls are as of July 2025.
