= Michael Goudie =

Michael Goudie is a New Zealand politician who was an Auckland Councillor.

== Political career ==
Auckland Council
Years	Ward	Affiliation
2010–2013	Albany	Independent

In 2007, Michael Goudie was the youngest ever councillor elected to the Rodney District Council.

In the 2010 Auckland Council elections, Goudie was elected to represent the Albany ward on the Auckland Council Governing Body. Goudie successfully served two terms before retiring in 2013.
