= Hibiscus and Bays Local Board =

Coordinates: 36.59245750°S 174.6937814°E

Hibiscus and Bays Local Board Te Poari a Rohe o Hibiscus and Bays
- Local board of Auckland Council
- Hibiscus and Bays in the Auckland Region
- Country: New Zealand
- Region: Auckland
- Territorial authority: Auckland Council
- Ward: Albany Ward
- Legislated: 2010

Area
  - Land: 110.02 km^{2} (42.48 sq mi)

Population (June 2025)
  - Total: 121,100
  - Density: 1,101/km^{2} (2,851/sq mi)

Local board members

Leadership
- Chairperson: Alexis Poppelbaum, Backing the Bays
- Deputy chairperson: Jake Law, Coast Community

Structure
- Seats: 8
- Political groups: Backing the Bays (4); Coast Community (2); Coast People (2)
- Length of term: 3 years

Elections
- Last election: 2025
- Next election: 2028

Meeting place
- 2 Glen Road, Browns Bay, Auckland

The Hibiscus and Bays Local Board is one of the 21 local boards of the Auckland Council. It is one of two boards overseen by the council's Albany Ward councillors. The board consists of eight members elected at large.

The board's area is divided into the Hibiscus Coast subdivision and the East Coast Bays subdivision, the latter of which stretches as far south as Campbells Bay. The board area also includes Tiritiri Matangi Island, off the end of the Whangaparāoa Peninsula.

== Geography ==
The area includes the suburbs of Waiwera, Orewa, Red Beach, Stanmore Bay, Manly, Army Bay, Gulf Harbour, Arkles Bay, Silverdale, Stillwater, Long Bay, Torbay, Waiake, Browns Bay, Rothesay Bay, Murrays Bay, Mairangi Bay and Campbells Bay.

The boundary of Hibiscus and Bays stretches from Waiwera in the north to Campbells Bay in the south, and across the Whangaparaoa Peninsula out to Tiritiri Matangi Island in the east. The main town centres are at Orewa, Silverdale, Whangaparaoa, Browns Bay and Mairangi Bay.

== Demographics ==
Hibiscus and Bays Local Board Area covers 110.02 km^{2} (42.48 sq mi) and had an estimated population of 121,100 as of June 2025, with a population density of 1,101 people per km^{2}.

Historical population
Year	Pop.	±% p.a.
2006	81,858	—
2013	89,829	+1.34%
2018	104,010	+2.97%
2023	114,033	+1.86%

Hibiscus and Bays had a population of 114,033 in the 2023 New Zealand census, an increase of 10,023 people (9.6%) since the 2018 census, and an increase of 24,204 people (26.9%) since the 2013 census. There were 55,452 males, 58,203 females and 378 people of other genders in 40,431 dwellings. 2.8% of people identified as LGBTIQ+. The median age was 41.3 years (compared with 38.1 years nationally). There were 21,477 people (18.8%) aged under 15 years, 18,345 (16.1%) aged 15 to 29, 52,998 (46.5%) aged 30 to 64, and 21,210 (18.6%) aged 65 or older.

People could identify as more than one ethnicity. The results were 75.9% European (Pākehā); 7.2% Māori; 2.4% Pasifika; 20.6% Asian; 2.2% Middle Eastern, Latin American and African New Zealanders (MELAA); and 2.2% other, which includes people giving their ethnicity as "New Zealander". English was spoken by 94.7%, Māori language by 1.0%, Samoan by 0.2%, and other languages by 24.7%. No language could be spoken by 1.9% (e.g. too young to talk). New Zealand Sign Language was known by 0.3%. The percentage of people born overseas was 42.9, compared with 28.8% nationally.

Religious affiliations were 33.4% Christian, 1.2% Hindu, 0.7% Islam, 0.2% Māori religious beliefs, 1.1% Buddhist, 0.4% New Age, 0.2% Jewish, and 1.1% other religions. People who answered that they had no religion were 55.1%, and 6.7% of people did not answer the census question.

Of those at least 15 years old, 29,469 (31.8%) people had a bachelor's or higher degree, 43,065 (46.5%) had a post-high school certificate or diploma, and 20,022 (21.6%) people exclusively held high school qualifications. The median income was $46,400, compared with $41,500 nationally. 17,022 people (18.4%) earned over $100,000 compared to 12.1% nationally. The employment status of those at least 15 was that 47,388 (51.2%) people were employed full-time, 13,191 (14.3%) were part-time, and 1,920 (2.1%) were unemployed.

== 2025-2028 term ==
The current board members for the 2025-2028 term, elected at the 2025 local elections, are:

Name	Affiliation	Subdivision	Position
Alexis Poppelbaum	Backing the Bays	East Coast Bays	Chairperson
Jake Law	Coast Community	Hibiscus Coast	Deputy Chairperson
Julia Parfitt	Backing the Bays	East Coast Bays	Board member
Leanne Willis	Coast People	Hibiscus Coast	Board member
Gregg Walden	Backing the Bays	East Coast Bays	Board member
Gary Brown	Coast People	Hibiscus Coast	Board member
Gemma Moffatt	Coast Community	Hibiscus Coast	Board member
Mike Bishop	Backing the Bays	East Coast Bays	Board member

== 2022–2025 term ==
The board members, elected in the 2022 local body elections, in election order:

Gary Brown, Coast People, (10405 votes)
Alexis Poppelbaum, Backing the Bays, (9195 votes)
Julia Grace Parfitt, Backing the Bays, (8567 votes)
Leanne Willis, Coast People, (7925 votes)
Victoria Short, Independent Locals, (6635 votes)
Sam Mills, Coast People, (6016 votes)
Gregg Walden, Backing the Bays, (5794 votes)
Jake Law, Team Coast, (5618 votes)

== 2019–2022 term ==
Board members, elected in the 2019 local body elections, in election order:

Julia Parfitt, Backing the Bays, (8052 votes)
Janet Fitzgerald, Positively Penlink, (7569 votes)
Alexis Poppelbaum, Backing the Bays, (6935 votes)
Gary Brown, Coast People and Penlink First, (6827 votes)
Andy Dunn, Coast People and Penlink First, (6793 votes)
Leanne Willis, Coast People and Penlink First, (5790 votes)
Gary Holmes, Backing the Bays, (5723 votes)
Victoria Short, Independent, (5020 votes)

== 2016–2019 term ==
Board members, elected in the 2016 local body elections, in election order:

Julia Parfitt, People over Politics, (8481 votes)
Janet Fitzgerald, Positively Penlink, (7924 votes)
Mike Williamson, People and Penlink First, (7687 votes)
Vicki Watson, People and Penlink First, (6856 votes)
Caitlin Watson, People and Penlink First, (6508 votes)
David Cooper, People over Politics, (5986 votes)
Christina Bettany, (no affiliation), (5847 votes)
Gary Holmes, People over Politics, (5645 votes)

== See also ==
- Penlink - an upcoming bypass highway
