= Shakespear Regional Park =

Nature park in New Zealand

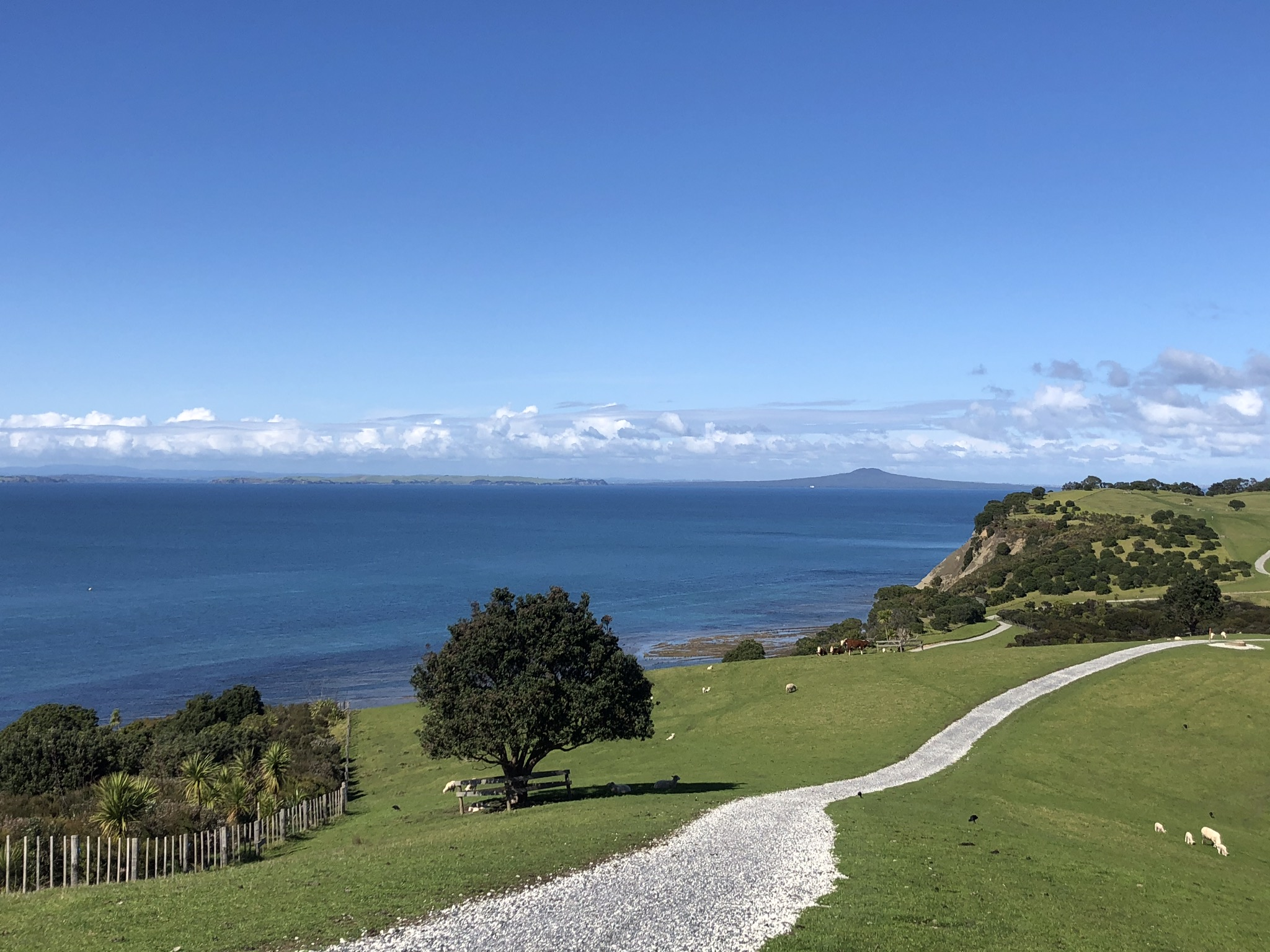
- Walking trails at Shakespear Regional Park

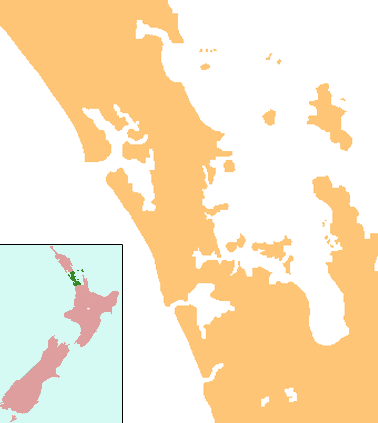
- Location within New Zealand Auckland
- Location: Auckland, New Zealand
- Coordinates: 36.608°S 174.823°E
- Area: 500 hectares (1,200 acres)
- Operator: Auckland Council

Shakespear Regional Park (Māori: Te Papa Rēhia ā-Rohe o Shakespear) is a nature park in the Auckland Region of New Zealand. It is located at the tip of the Whangaparāoa Peninsula, and is named after the Shakespear family who first came on to the land when Sir Robert Hamilton purchased 1392 acres on behalf of his grandson, Robert Shakespear, from Ranulph Dacre in 1883.

The park includes the Tamaki Leadership Centre, a Royal New Zealand Navy base.

== Geography ==
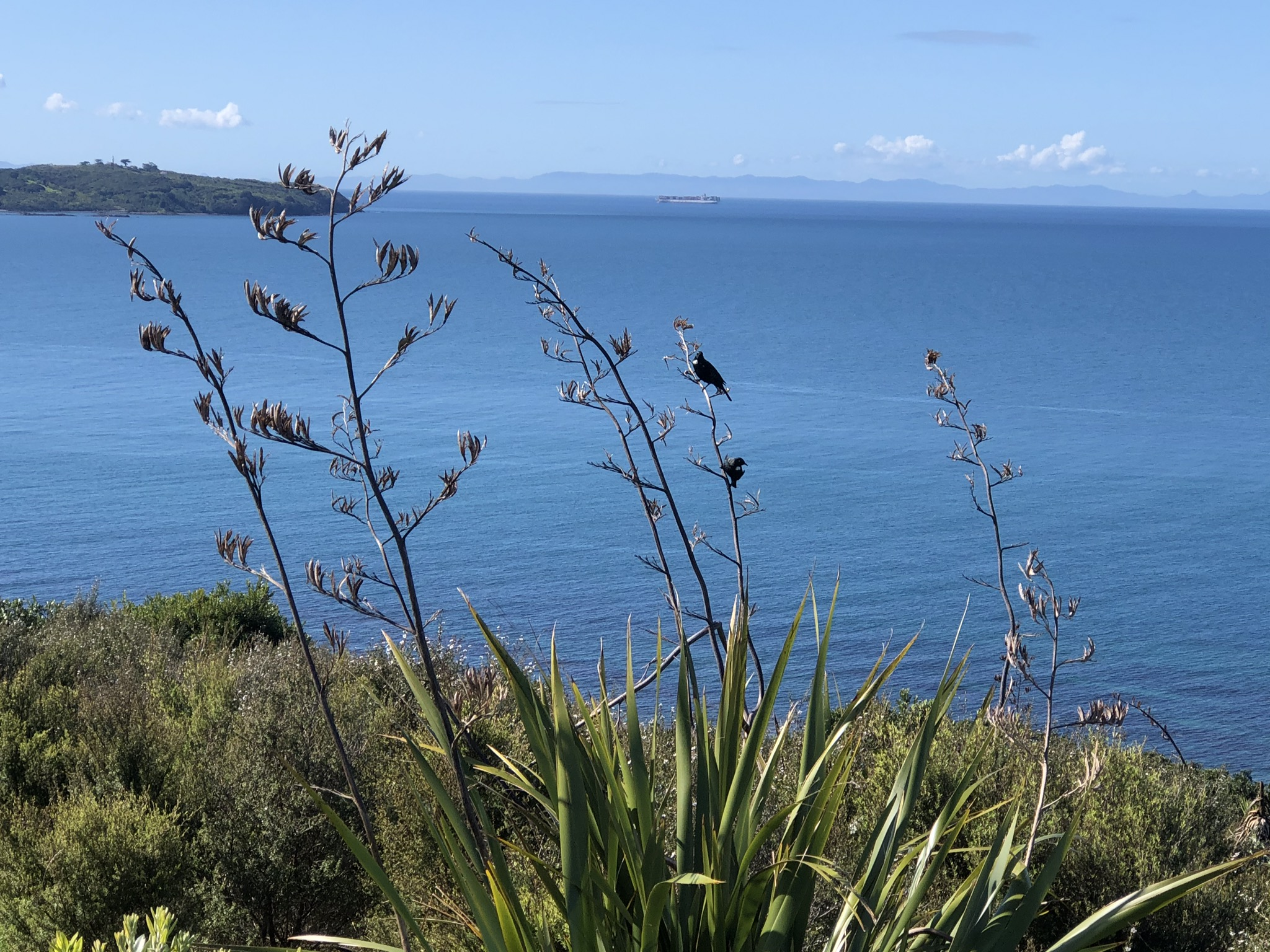
Tui in the harakeke (flax) at Shakespear Regional Park

The park is located at the end of the Whangaparāoa Peninsula. Much of the coastline is lined by sandstone cliffs, which shelter the beach-lined Te Haruhi Bay. At the Park's western border, a narrow lowland separates Okoromai Bay and Army Bay. It used to be thickly populated with kelp but has now been thinned out by kina population.

Most of the regional park is the Shakespear Open Sanctuary, a collaboration between the Shakespear Open Sanctuary Society and local authorities. Kiwi birds have been spotted in the sanctuary.

A 1.7-kilometre (1.1 mi) pest/predator-proof fence across the peninsula, completed in March 2011, protects the park's wildlife. This includes resident invertebrates and lizards, along with birds migrating from the nearby Tiritiri Matangi island sanctuary. Brodifacoum poison airdrops were conducted in July 2011 to eradicate mammalian pests.

== History ==
The Kawerau hapū Ngāti Kahu traditionally inhabited the area, prior to the arrival of Europeans. Ngāti Kahu's major focuses of settlement were around Te Haruhi Bay and Army Bay. Whangaparaoa Peninsula was purchased by the government in 1853, after which settlers began developing the land for grazing. Ngāti Kahu continued to live on the land until the 1890s. The Shakespear family acquired many of the landholdings in 1883, and farmed the area for much of the 20th century.

The northern area of the park was acquired by the New Zealand Army during World War II. The Army still occupies the site, and because of this, pillboxes can be found around the park.

In 1967 the Shakespear family sold their land to the Auckland Regional Council, who established the Shakespear Regional Park.

== Recreation ==
There are three main walkways in the park: Heritage Trail, Lookout Track and Tiri Tiri Track.
