= Guam High School =

Guam High School may refer to:

== United States ==
- Guam High School (Guam)

== South Korea ==
- Guam High School (Daegu)
