= Wentworth College, Auckland =

Wentworth College

Location
- 65 Gulf Harbour Drive, Gulf Harbour, Auckland, New Zealand; 36°36′47.17″S 174°47′27.80″E

Information
- Type: Private coed secondary, years 7–13
- Established: 27 August 2003; 23 years ago
- Ministry of Education Institution no.: 484
- Principal: Bruce Tong
- Enrolment: 468 (July 2026)
- Colours: Red; Blue; Gold
- Socio-economic decile: 10Z
- Website: wentworth.school.nz

Wentworth College is a private secondary college in Gulf Harbour, in the Auckland region of New Zealand. Wentworth Primary is a private primary school which shares the site.

== Primary ==
The primary services years one to six with a low school roll of just 155 students.

== College ==
Wentworth College is the older, more commonly known secondary (years 7–13) part of the school with a roll of 468 students.

== Computer Science College ==
The Wentworth Computer Science College (years 9-13) operates as a satellite campus of Wentworth College and provides Cambridge International examinations in years 11-13 in a variety of subjects in addition to a STEM and in particular computer-science focused curriculum in years 9-10, and industry qualifications in applied sciences in higher years. It is located in a commercial building in Newmarket.

== Education examinations ==
In 2008, Wentworth College decided to transition from the New Zealand examination standard, National Certificate of Educational Achievement (NCEA), to the University of Cambridge International Examinations (CIE). The first group of students completed their IGCSE level (year 11) in 2009; these students then progressed onto their AS level which they completed at the end of 2010. These students then went on to finish and complete the A-levels at the end of 2011. The Class of 2011 were the first transitioned, CIE students to graduate the College and were the first to receive Wentworth College Diplomas. the entire school has been on the Cambridge standard since 2011.

== International students ==
Wentworth College constantly has international students in its specialised courses. These students come from all over the world, with the majority from Asia. Wentworth also participates in student exchange programs when requested by students to do so. Countries that students have come from include South Korea, Thailand, China, Japan, Taiwan, Argentina, the United States of America and Norway. Large school trips are also welcomed, with Wentworth students adopting a student each for a week to their home and providing them with insight to life in New Zealand.

== Operation and history ==
Both of the facilities are privately owned and operated. The primary and secondary parts of the school work close together on all aspects of the school life, sharing one principal, Bruce Tong. Second in command was Steve Wackrow until 2011. The current Head of College is Lisa Chamberlain, while the head of the Computer Science College is Charles Wilkinson.

The college opened on 27 August 2003; 23 years ago. The primary opened in February 2008 on the same site.

== Government reviews and ratings ==
Both of the facilities have a decile rating of 10. Both also have a very positive Education Review Office (ERO) report. The latest College Report was conducted in October 2009. The first Primary report in August 2008.
