= Guam High School (Daegu) =

High school in Daegu, South Korea

- 구암고등학교
- Daegu; South Korea

Information
- Established: 1997; 29 years ago

Guam High School (Korean: 구암고등학교) is a high school that is located in Daegu in South Korea.

== Symbol of school ==
The flower that symbolizes the school is Japanese apricot flower, which indicates elegant figure, noble dignity, elegant curve beauty. The tree is T. caespitosa, which means strong patience, vitality, firm spirit and integrity, stubborn intention and eternity.

== History ==
The school was approved on February 25 1997, and the first entrance ceremony was held on March 17 1997.
