= Stanmore Bay =

- Suburb
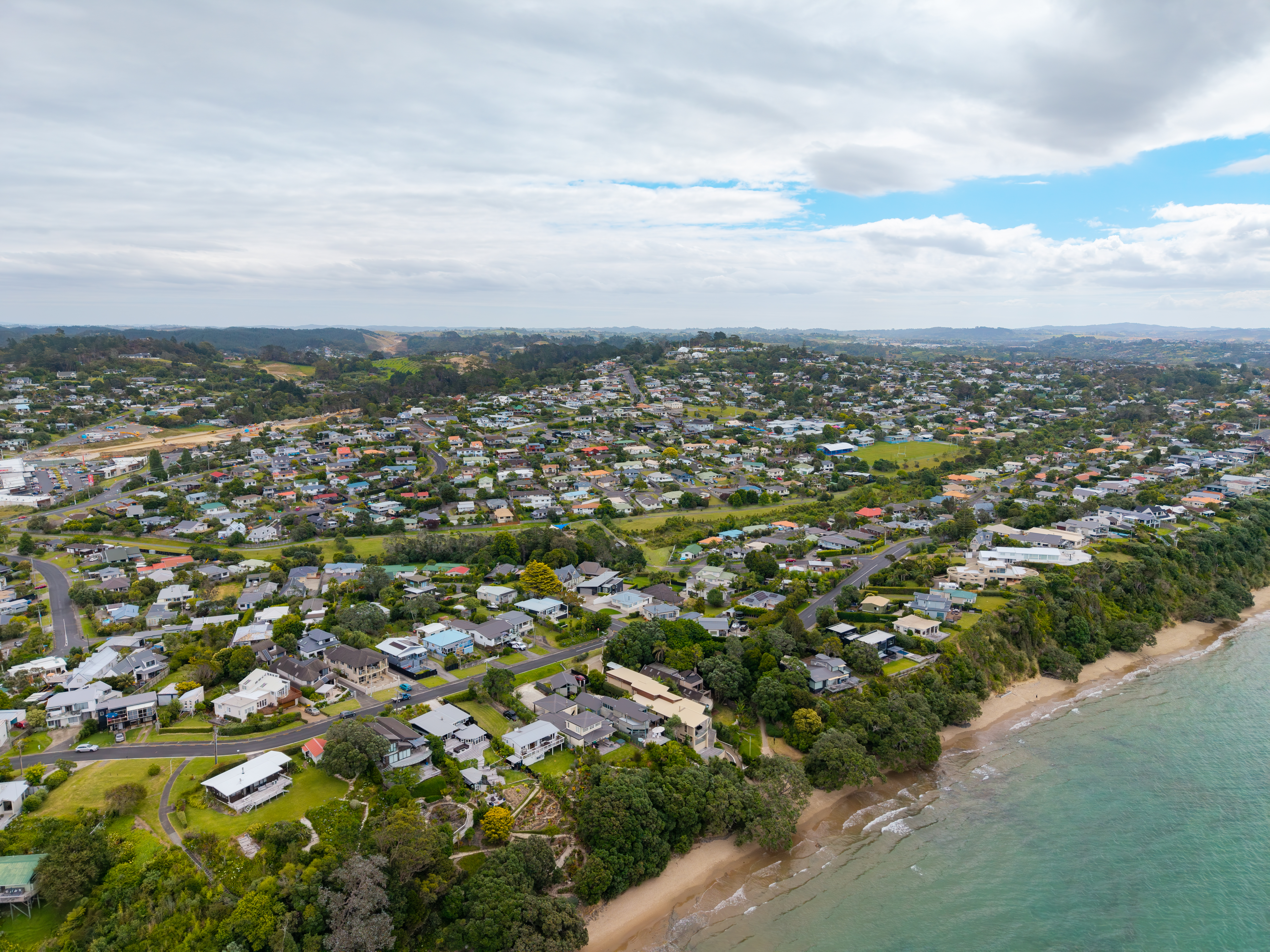
- View of Stanmore Bay
- Interactive map of Stanmore Bay
- Coordinates: 36.6333308°S 174.7333304°E
- Country: New Zealand
- City: Auckland
- Local authority: Auckland Council
- Electoral ward: Albany ward
- Local board: Hibiscus and Bays

Area
  - Land: 574 ha (1,420 acres)

Population (June 2025)
  - Total: 11,170
  - Density: 1,950/km^{2} (5,040/sq mi)
- Postcode: 0932

Red Beach	(Whangaparaoa Bay)
Stillwater	Stanmore Bay	Manly
(Weiti River)	Wade Heads	Arkles Bay

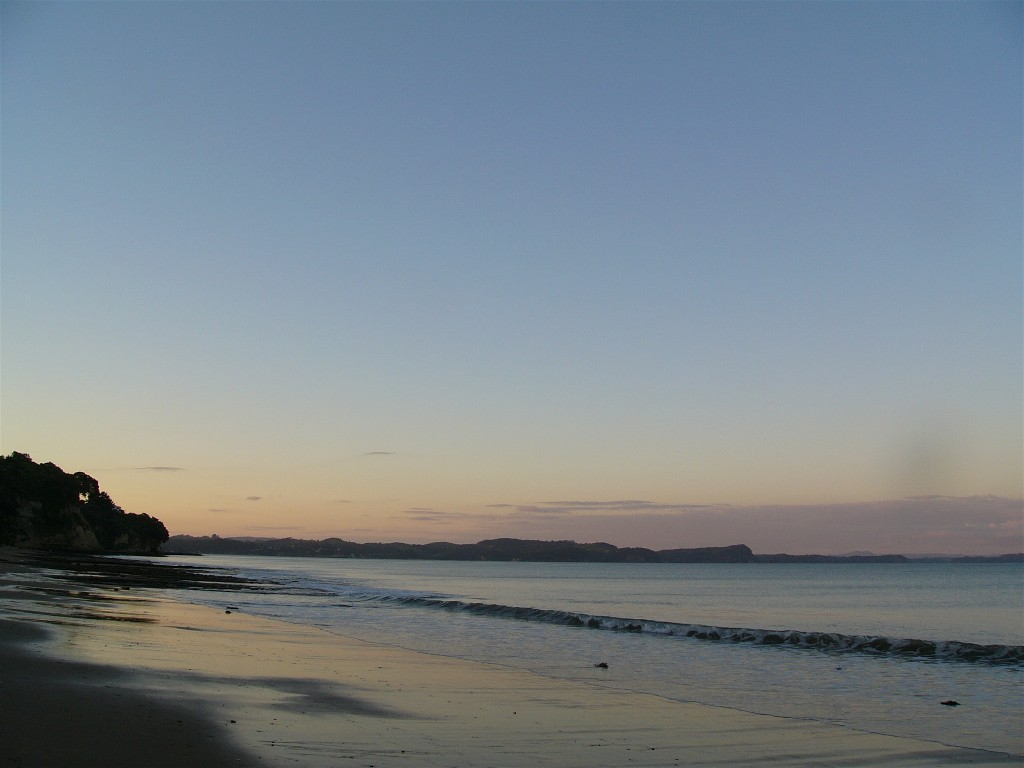
Sunset at Stanmore Bay.

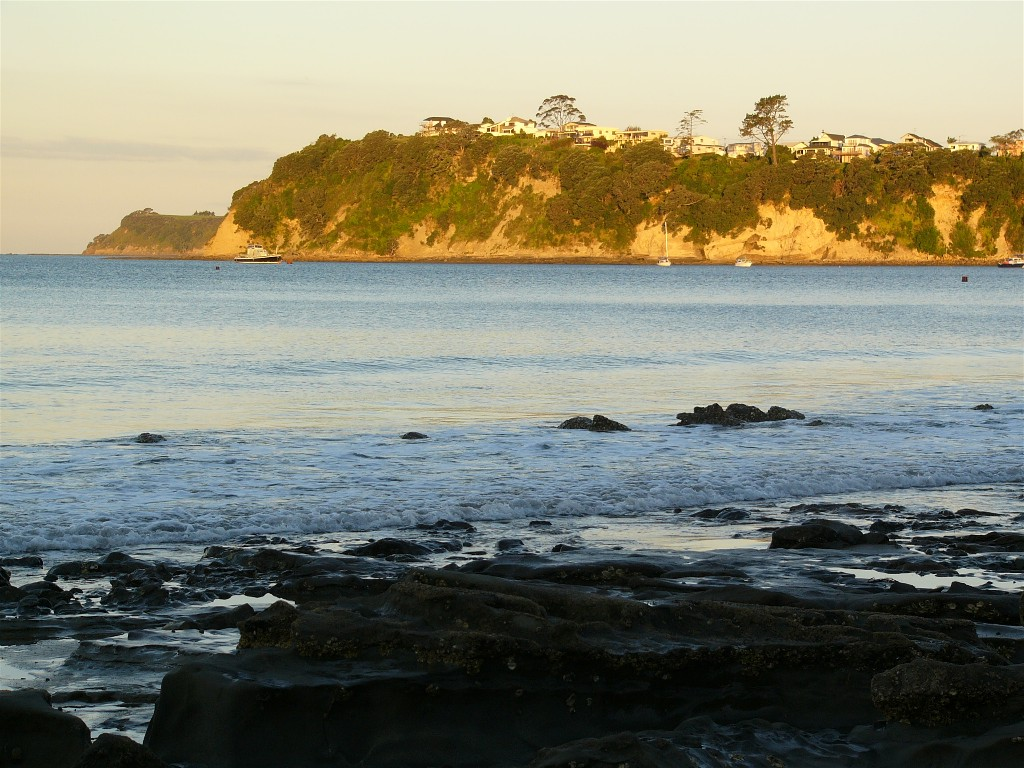
The last rays of the setting sun light up the headland at Stanmore Bay.

Stanmore Bay is a suburb and beach located on the Whangaparāoa Peninsula, in the Auckland Region of New Zealand. The beach is on the northern side of the peninsula.

== History ==
Stanmore bay was first settled by European settlers in the 1850s, and was named Glanville's Bay after the early residents. It was renamed Stanmore bay by the Hill family, who called it this after Stanmore in London. The area was named Stanmore by Walter James Hill son of Henry Hill who emigrated to New Zealand in 1853, because it reminded the family of Stanmore, England where they came from. The Hill family purchased 500 acres to farm but because it was only accessible by boat, they found it difficult to pursue farming there.

== Demographics ==
Stanmore Bay covers 5.74 km^{2} (2.22 sq mi) and had an estimated population of 13,200 as of June 2025, with a population density of 1,946 people per km^{2}.

Historical population
Year	Pop.	±% p.a.
2006	10,164	—
2013	9,225	−1.38%
2018	10,212	+2.05%
2023	10,770	+1.07%
The 2006 population is for a larger area of 7.40 km^{2} which includes Arkles Bay. Source:

Stanmore Bay had a population of 10,770 in the 2023 New Zealand census, an increase of 558 people (5.5%) since the 2018 census, and an increase of 1,545 people (16.7%) since the 2013 census. There were 5,220 males, 5,505 females and 42 people of other genders in 3,975 dwellings. 2.8% of people identified as LGBTIQ+. The median age was 38.1 years (compared with 38.1 years nationally). There were 2,211 people (20.5%) aged under 15 years, 1,812 (16.8%) aged 15 to 29, 5,052 (46.9%) aged 30 to 64, and 1,698 (15.8%) aged 65 or older.

People could identify as more than one ethnicity. The results were 85.2% European (Pākehā); 11.9% Māori; 3.5% Pasifika; 11.2% Asian; 1.5% Middle Eastern, Latin American and African New Zealanders (MELAA); and 2.3% other, which includes people giving their ethnicity as "New Zealander". English was spoken by 96.3%, Māori language by 1.6%, Samoan by 0.3%, and other languages by 14.7%. No language could be spoken by 2.5% (e.g. too young to talk). New Zealand Sign Language was known by 0.2%. The percentage of people born overseas was 31.4, compared with 28.8% nationally.

Religious affiliations were 30.9% Christian, 1.6% Hindu, 0.5% Islam, 0.3% Māori religious beliefs, 0.6% Buddhist, 0.6% New Age, 0.1% Jewish, and 1.3% other religions. People who answered that they had no religion were 56.9%, and 7.4% of people did not answer the census question.

Of those at least 15 years old, 1,611 (18.8%) people had a bachelor's or higher degree, 4,491 (52.5%) had a post-high school certificate or diploma, and 1,941 (22.7%) people exclusively held high school qualifications. The median income was $47,200, compared with $41,500 nationally. 1,290 people (15.1%) earned over $100,000 compared to 12.1% nationally. The employment status of those at least 15 was that 4,644 (54.3%) people were employed full-time, 1,164 (13.6%) were part-time, and 213 (2.5%) were unemployed.

Individual statistical areas
Name	Area (km^{2})	Population	Density (per km^{2})	Dwellings	Median age	Median income
Vipond	1.38	2,889	2,093	1,116	40.6 years	$44,300
Stanmore Bay West	0.99	2,646	2,673	951	36.7 years	$50,300
Stanmore Bay East	1.34	2,844	2,122	1,056	37.7 years	$45,100
Whangaparāoa Central	2.03	2,388	1,176	855	37.2 years	$49,900
New Zealand					38.1 years	$41,500

== Education ==
Whangaparaoa College is a secondary (years 7-13) school with a decile rating of 9 and a roll of 1,948 (March 2026). The college opened at the beginning of 2005, incorporating Hibiscus Coast Intermediate School. It was initially called Stanmore Bay Secondary School.

Stanmore Bay School is a contributing primary (years 1-6) school with a decile rating of 8 and a roll of 470 (March 2026). The school celebrated its 25th Jubilee in 2004.

Both schools are coeducational.
