= Grafton High School =

Grafton High School is the name of several high schools:

== Australia ==
- Grafton High School (New South Wales), Grafton, New South Wales

== United States ==
- Grafton High School (North Dakota), Grafton, North Dakota
- Grafton High School (Massachusetts), Grafton, Massachusetts
- Grafton High School (Virginia), Yorktown, Virginia
- Grafton High School (West Virginia), Grafton, West Virginia; a high school in Taylor County, West Virginia
- Grafton High School (Wisconsin), Grafton, Wisconsin
