= Manly, New Zealand =

Manly
- Suburb
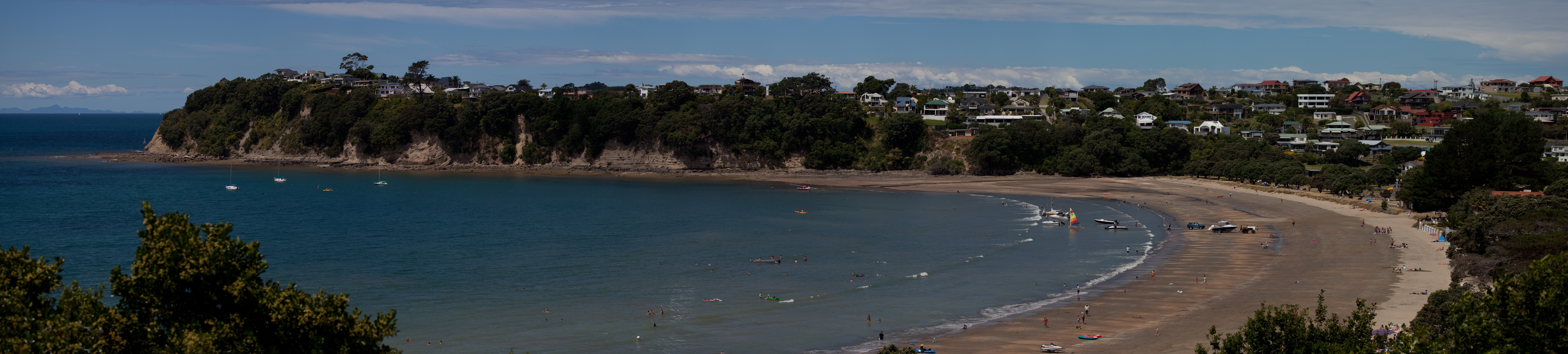
- Big Manly Beach
- Interactive map of Manly
- Coordinates: 36.632630°S 174.761880°E
- Country: New Zealand
- City: Auckland
- Local authority: Auckland Council
- Electoral ward: Albany ward
- Local board: Hibiscus and Bays

Area
  - Land: 261 ha (640 acres)

Population (June 2025)
  - Total: 6,020
  - Density: 2,310/km^{2} (5,970/sq mi)
- Postcode: 0930

Stanmore Bay	(Waiau Bay)	Tindalls Beach
	Manly	(Matakatia Bay)
Wade Heads	(Hauraki Gulf)	(Hauraki Gulf)

Manly is a suburb on the Whangaparāoa Peninsula, towards the northern end of Auckland, New Zealand. Manly Village is an established shopping centre, with the residential areas of Big Manly Beach to the north and Little Manly Beach to the south. The area was once a seaside holiday location, but has become residential suburbs within commuting distance of central Auckland city.

== History ==
Initially inhabited primarily by Ngāti Kahu, Manly is also home to two pā sites. In 1851 it was brought by the Crown as part of the Mahurangi purchase. By the 1890s, the land was settled by the Polkinghorne family.

In the 1920s, Ted Brown and Laurie Taylor began development of the area, also constructing a pier off Little Manly Beach. During this time the region was renamed after Manly a geographically similar seaside suburb north of Sydney.

Around 1927 the Hopper Family moved into the area, and farmed the area for a number of years. Later in the 1950s, the family then began subdividing the remaining land along with various other parts of the Hibiscus Coast.

== Demographics ==
Manly covers 2.61 km^{2} (1.01 sq mi) and had an estimated population of 6,020 as of June 2025, with a population density of 2,307 people per km^{2}.

Historical population
Year	Pop.	±% p.a.
2006	5,253	—
2013	5,643	+1.03%
2018	5,904	+0.91%
2023	5,928	+0.08%

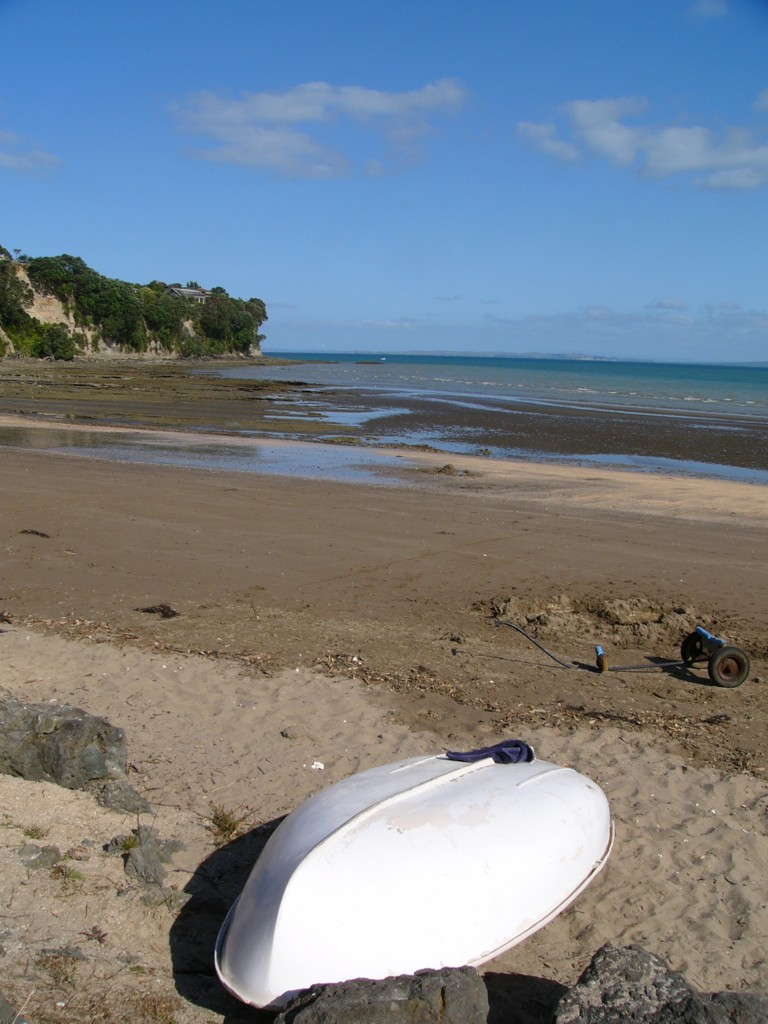
Big Manly beach

Manly had a population of 5,928 in the 2023 New Zealand census, an increase of 24 people (0.4%) since the 2018 census, and an increase of 285 people (5.1%) since the 2013 census. There were 2,853 males, 3,033 females and 42 people of other genders in 2,298 dwellings. 2.8% of people identified as LGBTIQ+. The median age was 44.6 years (compared with 38.1 years nationally). There were 1,095 people (18.5%) aged under 15 years, 849 (14.3%) aged 15 to 29, 2,670 (45.0%) aged 30 to 64, and 1,314 (22.2%) aged 65 or older.

People could identify as more than one ethnicity. The results were 90.1% European (Pākehā); 11.2% Māori; 3.6% Pasifika; 5.5% Asian; 1.2% Middle Eastern, Latin American and African New Zealanders (MELAA); and 2.3% other, which includes people giving their ethnicity as "New Zealander". English was spoken by 97.5%, Māori language by 1.5%, Samoan by 0.1%, and other languages by 10.8%. No language could be spoken by 1.6% (e.g. too young to talk). New Zealand Sign Language was known by 0.3%. The percentage of people born overseas was 27.7, compared with 28.8% nationally.

Religious affiliations were 30.0% Christian, 0.7% Hindu, 0.2% Islam, 0.3% Māori religious beliefs, 0.7% Buddhist, 0.5% New Age, 0.2% Jewish, and 1.5% other religions. People who answered that they had no religion were 58.5%, and 7.7% of people did not answer the census question.

Of those at least 15 years old, 930 (19.2%) people had a bachelor's or higher degree, 2,586 (53.5%) had a post-high school certificate or diploma, and 1,038 (21.5%) people exclusively held high school qualifications. The median income was $43,400, compared with $41,500 nationally. 756 people (15.6%) earned over $100,000 compared to 12.1% nationally. The employment status of those at least 15 was that 2,337 (48.4%) people were employed full-time, 729 (15.1%) were part-time, and 90 (1.9%) were unemployed.

Individual statistical areas
Name	Area (km^{2})	Population	Density (per km^{2})	Dwellings	Median age	Median income
Manly West	1.03	2,367	2,298	891	45.1 years	$45,100
Manly East	1.57	3,561	2.268	1,407	44.2 years	$42,400
New Zealand					38.1 years	$41,500

== Beaches ==
Manly is home to three Whangaparāoa Peninsula beaches, two on the northern and one on the southern side. The largest and most notable is the soft, white, sandy, and popular swimming location Big Manly Beach. The beach stretches approximately 1.25 kilometres and looks out over Whangaparāoa Bay. Over the summer months, a swimming pontoon is usually moored at Big Manly Beach.

Big Manly is accompanied by Swann Beach, which sits to the west, together forming Polkinghornes Bay.

Little Manly, which is located on the southern side, is known for its calm and picturesque outlook and conditions. At a length of around 300 metres Little Manly is one of the peninsula's smaller beaches. In 2018, Little Manly also gained a swimming pontoon which is moored there over the summer.

== Education ==
Whangaparaoa School is a coeducational contributing primary (years 1-6) school with a roll of 844 students as of October 2025. The school celebrated its centenary in 2002.

== Sport and recreation ==
=== Sailing ===
The Manly Sailing Club hosts a variety of Regional, National and International regattas off the coast of Big Manly Beach. Formally established on 13 April 1964 (61 years ago), the club also provides a variety of Learn to Sail Programmes through the Russell Coutts Sailing Foundation, and has links to schools in the area.

=== Bowling ===
Manly has been home to the Manly Bowling Club since it was incorporated on 13 August 1956; 69 years ago. Each year the club hosts a number of bowling, and social events.

=== Tennis ===
Manly is home to two tennis clubs, situated in both Edith Hopper Park and Manly Park.

The Whangaparaoa Tennis Club is the larger of the two and situated in Edith Hopper Park. The tennis club was established in 1951; 75 years ago in Manly Park, where the Manly Park Seniors Club is now located and later shifted to it current location in Edith Hopper Park in 1978. The club provides six artificial flood-lit courts, and accompanying facilities, offering courses for people of all ages and skill levels.

Situated in Manly Park, alongside the bowling club, the Manly Park Seniors Tennis Club has four courts as well as accompanying facilities.

=== Netball ===
The Hibiscus Coast Netball Centre is home to six netball courts is located in Edith Hopper Park. On 25 February 2021 the Hibiscus Coast Netball Centre voted in favour of Netball North Harbour taking over administration of the club.

=== Triathlon ===
Manly Park has a number of times hosted the Weet-bix Tryathlon.
