= Grant High School =

Grant High School may refer to the following schools:

== Australia ==
- Grant High School (Mount Gambier), South Australia

== United States ==
- Grant Community High School in Fox Lake, Illinois
- Grant County High School in Dry Ridge, Kentucky
- Grant High School (Louisiana), part of the Grant Parish School Board in Louisiana
- Grant High School (Los Angeles), in Valley Glen
- Grant High School (Portland, Oregon)
- Grant Union High School (John Day, Oregon)
- Grant Union High School (Sacramento, California)
- U. S. Grant High School (Oklahoma), in Oklahoma City
