= Albany ward (local government) =

- Ward of Auckland
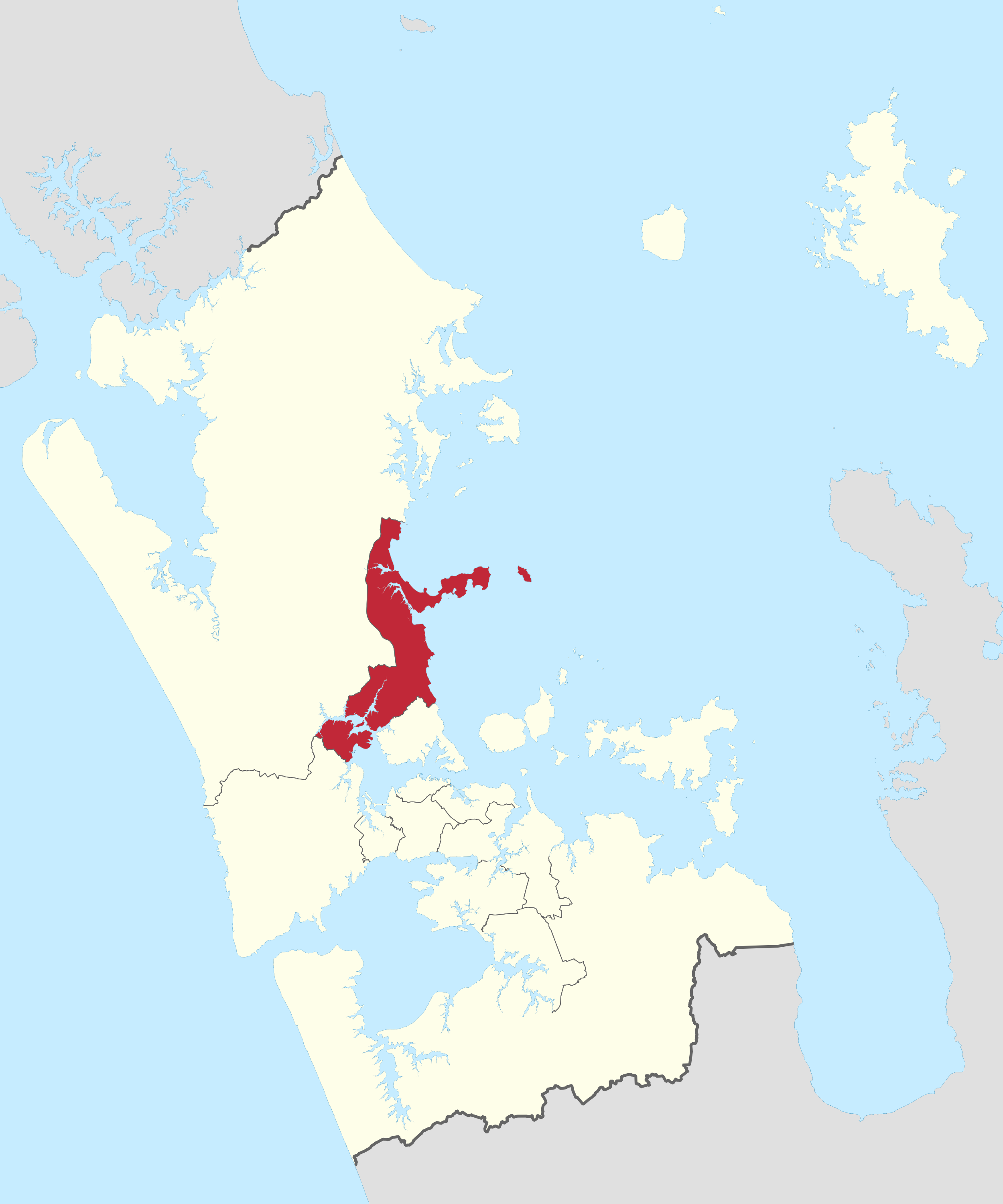
- Country: New Zealand
- Island: North Island
- Region: Auckland Region

Area
  - Land: 179.74 km^{2} (69.40 sq mi)

Population (June 2025)
  - Total: 205,600
  - Density: 1,144/km^{2} (2,963/sq mi)

The Albany ward is an Auckland Council ward which elects two councillors and covers the area of the Hibiscus and Bays and Upper Harbour local boards. The two councillors are currently John Watson and Victoria Short for the 2025-2028 term.

== Demographics ==
Albany ward covers 179.74 km^{2} (69.40 sq mi) and had an estimated population of 205,600 as of June 2025, with a population density of 1,144 people per km^{2}.

Historical population
Year	Pop.	±% p.a.
2006	124,731	—
2013	143,499	+2.02%
2018	166,854	+3.06%
2023	190,992	+2.74%

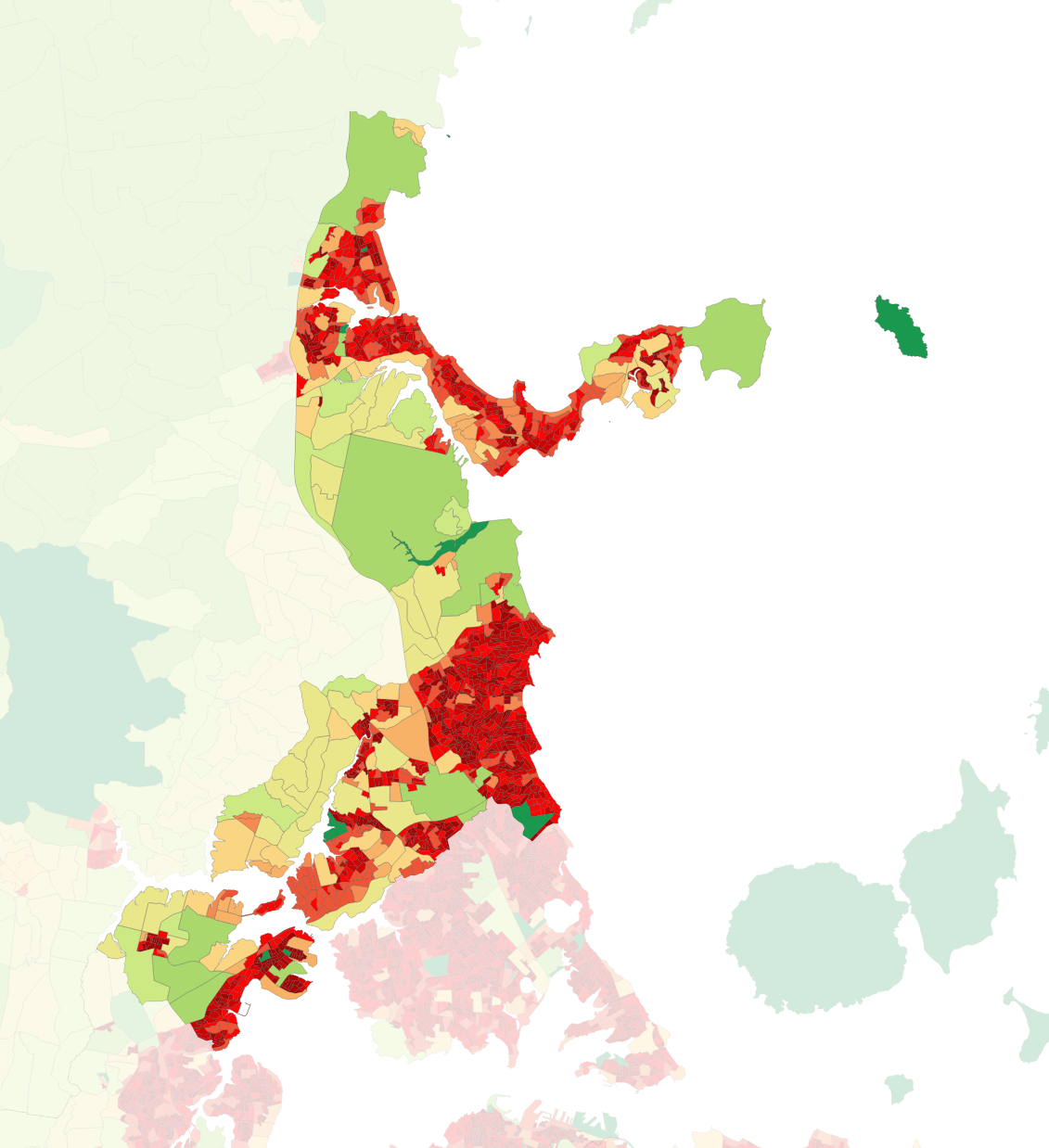
Population density in the 2023 census

Albany ward had a population of 190,992 in the 2023 New Zealand census, an increase of 24,138 people (14.5%) since the 2018 census, and an increase of 47,493 people (33.1%) since the 2013 census. There were 93,375 males, 97,008 females and 606 people of other genders in 65,652 dwellings. 3.0% of people identified as LGBTIQ+. The median age was 39.4 years (compared with 38.1 years nationally). There were 35,697 people (18.7%) aged under 15 years, 33,342 (17.5%) aged 15 to 29, 90,375 (47.3%) aged 30 to 64, and 31,578 (16.5%) aged 65 or older.

People could identify as more than one ethnicity. The results were 65.1% European (Pākehā); 6.7% Māori; 2.7% Pasifika; 30.6% Asian; 2.8% Middle Eastern, Latin American and African New Zealanders (MELAA); and 2.2% other, which includes people giving their ethnicity as "New Zealander". English was spoken by 92.9%, Māori language by 1.1%, Samoan by 0.3%, and other languages by 31.1%. No language could be spoken by 2.1% (e.g. too young to talk). New Zealand Sign Language was known by 0.3%. The percentage of people born overseas was 47.0, compared with 28.8% nationally.

Religious affiliations were 31.8% Christian, 2.0% Hindu, 1.3% Islam, 0.2% Māori religious beliefs, 1.5% Buddhist, 0.3% New Age, 0.2% Jewish, and 1.2% other religions. People who answered that they had no religion were 55.4%, and 6.2% of people did not answer the census question.

Of those at least 15 years old, 53,556 (34.5%) people had a bachelor's or higher degree, 67,665 (43.6%) had a post-high school certificate or diploma, and 34,080 (21.9%) people exclusively held high school qualifications. The median income was $47,200, compared with $41,500 nationally. 27,738 people (17.9%) earned over $100,000 compared to 12.1% nationally. The employment status of those at least 15 was that 81,450 (52.4%) people were employed full-time, 21,012 (13.5%) were part-time, and 3,384 (2.2%) were unemployed.

== Councillors ==
Albany Ward councillors of Auckland
- Incumbent; John Watson; Victoria Short
- Term length: Three years
- Inaugural holder: Michael Goudie; Wayne Walker
- Formation: 1 November 2010
- Website: www.aucklandcouncil.govt.nz

Election		Councillors elected	Affiliation	Votes	Notes
2010	1	Michael Goudie	Independent	9201	
2010	2	Wayne Walker	Putting People First	8547	
2013	1	Wayne Walker	Putting People First	13918	
2013	2	John Watson	Putting People First	12936	
2016	1	John Watson	Putting People First	19324	
2016	2	Wayne Walker	Putting People First	17938	
2019	1	John Watson	Putting People First	28510	
2019	2	Wayne Walker	Putting People First	24768	
2022	1	John Watson	Putting People First	20575	
2022	2	Wayne Walker	Putting People First	20007	
2025	1	Victoria Short	Fix Auckland	16410	
2025	2	John Watson	Putting People First	15449	

== Election results ==
Election Results for the Albany Ward:

=== 2025 ===
Albany ward
Affiliation	Candidate	Votes	%
Fix Auckland	Victoria Short	16,410	
Putting People First	John Watson^{†}	15,449	
Putting People First	Wayne Walker^{†}	14,885	
Fix Auckland	Gary Brown	10,269	
ACT Local	Samuel Mills	7,771	
Independent	Dylan Davey	5,108	
Independent	Kyle Parker	4,977	
Independent	Callum Blair	3,172	
Independent	John McCallum	1,372	
Informal		105	
Blank		1,267	
Turnout			
Registered		141,257	
Fix Auckland gain from Putting People First			
Putting People First hold			
^{†} incumbent

=== 2022 ===
Albany Ward
Affiliation	Candidate	Votes	%
Putting People First	John Watson	20,575	40.43
Putting People First	Wayne Walker	20,007	39.31
Independent Locals	Victoria Short	14,968	29.41
Your Community Future	Jake Law	9,120	17.92
Your Community Future	Sylvia Yang	7,298	14.34
Independent	Tony Corbett	6,529	12.83
Independent	Callum Blair	6,480	12.73
Communities First	John Davies	3,189	6.27
Independent	Alezix Heneti	1,381	2.71
Informal		87	0.17
Blank		3,073	6.04
Turnout		50,892	

=== 2016 Election Results ===
	Name	Affiliation	Votes	%
1	John Watson	Putting People First	19,324	24.4%
2	Wayne Walker	Putting People First	17,938	22.6%
	Lisa Whyte	Auckland Future	15,926	20.1%
	Graham Lowe	Auckland Future	15,549	19.6%
	John Bensch	Independent	5,126	6.5%
	Alezix Heneti	Independent	1,538	1.9%
Blank			3,852	4.9%
Informal			74	0.1
Turnout			79,327	
