= Weiti Village =

Settlement in Auckland, New Zealand

- Suburb
- Interactive map of Weiti Village
- Coordinates: 36.662°S 174.725°E
- Country: New Zealand
- City: Auckland
- Local authority: Auckland Council
- Electoral ward: Albany ward
- Local board: Hibiscus and Bays

Area
  - Land: 103 ha (250 acres)

Population (June 2025)
  - Total: 100
  - Density: 97/km^{2} (250/sq mi)
- Postcode: 0794

Silverdale	Stillwater	(Weiti River)
Dairy Flat	Weiti Village	(Karepiro Bay)
Redvale	Ōkura	Long Bay

Weiti Village, also called Weiti Bay, is a rural settlement north of Auckland City, New Zealand. It is under the local governance of the Auckland Council.

Weiti Village is on the north shore of the Ōkura River, and is separated from the rest of Auckland by the Okura Bush Scenic Reserve.

The settlement is a developing gated waterfront community, with the first houses completed in 2021. Protests were mounted against the development in 2018 on the grounds of potential damage to the Long Bay-Okura Marine Reserve.

== Demographics ==
Statistics New Zealand describes Weiti Village as a rural settlement, which covers 1.03 km^{2} (0.40 sq mi) and had an estimated population of 100 as of June 2025, with a population density of 97 people per km^{2}. The settlement is part of the larger Ōkura Bush statistical area.

Historical population
Year	Pop.	±% p.a.
2013	0	—
2018	0	0.00%
2023	60	—

Weiti Village had a population of 60 in the 2023 New Zealand census, and the area was not populated previously. There were 33 males and 27 females in 21 dwellings. The median age was 52.6 years (compared with 38.1 years nationally). There were 9 people (15.0%) aged under 15 years, 6 (10.0%) aged 15 to 29, 36 (60.0%) aged 30 to 64, and 6 (10.0%) aged 65 or older.

People could identify as more than one ethnicity. The results were 60.0% European (Pākehā), 35.0% Asian, and 10.0% Middle Eastern, Latin American, and African New Zealanders (MELAA). English was spoken by 90.0%, and other languages by 40.0%. The percentage of people born overseas was 55.0%, compared with 28.8% nationally.

The only religious affiliation listed was 30.0% Christian. People who answered that they had no religion were 65.0%. No one answered the census question.

Of those at least 15 years old, 15 (29.4%) people had a bachelor's or higher degree, 18 (35.3%) had a post-high school certificate or diploma, and 9 (17.6%) people exclusively held high school qualifications. The median income was $67,200, compared with $41,500 nationally. 21 people (41.2%) earned over $100,000 compared to 12.1% nationally. The employment status of those at least 15 was that 21 (41.2%) people were employed full-time and 6 (11.8%) were part-time.
