= Millwater, New Zealand =

Millwater
- Suburb
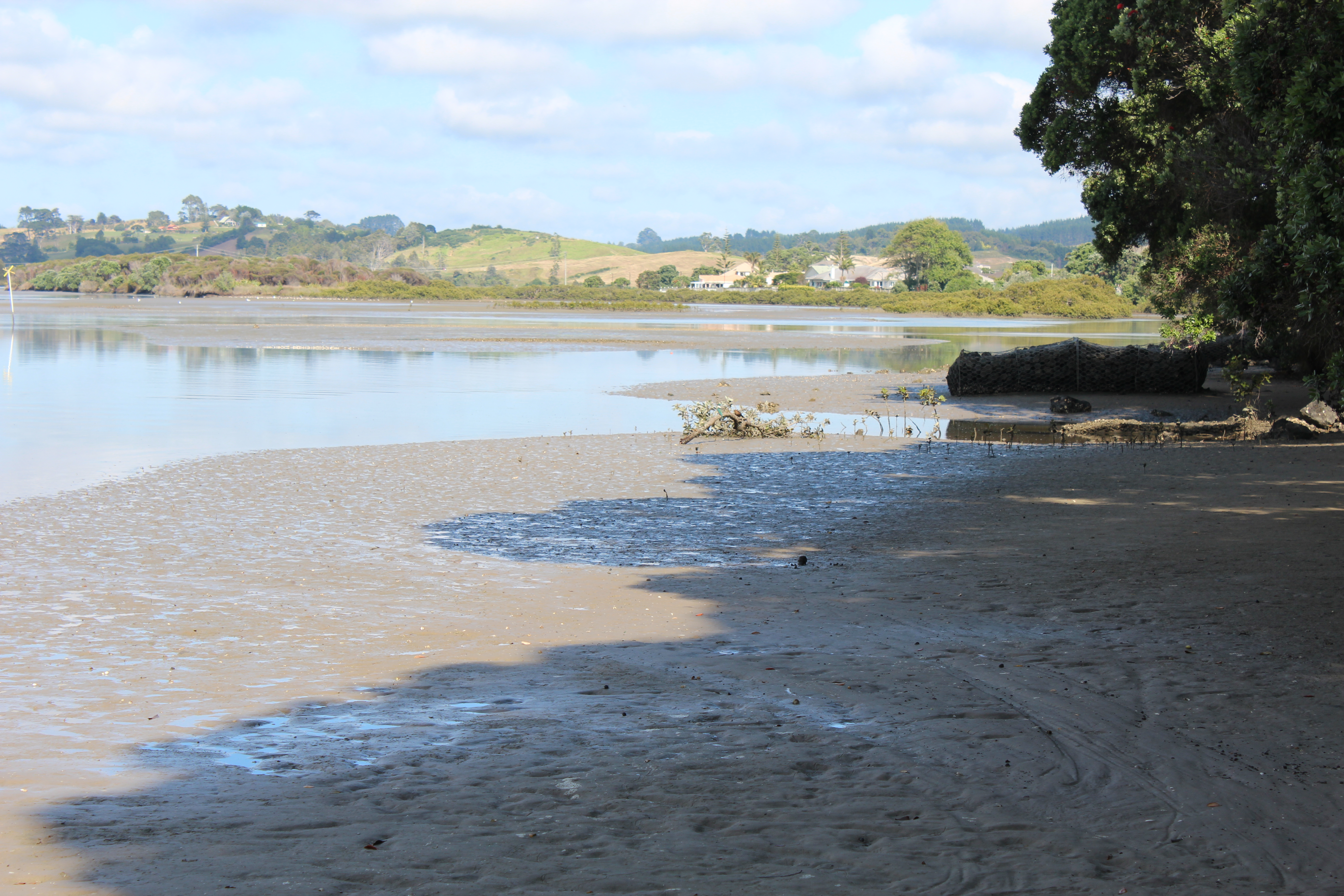
- Millwater seen from the Orewa River.
- Interactive map of Millwater
- Coordinates: 36°36′11″S 174°40′19″E
- Country: New Zealand
- City: Auckland
- Local authority: Auckland Council
- Electoral ward: Albany ward
- Local board: Hibiscus and Bays

Area
  - Land: 417 ha (1,030 acres)

Population (June 2025)
  - Total: 8,790
  - Density: 2,110/km^{2} (5,460/sq mi)
- Postcode: 0932

	Puhoi	Orewa
Milldale	Millwater	Red Beach
Dairy Flat	Silverdale	Stillwater

Millwater is a northern suburb of Auckland, located in New Zealand. It is about 33 kilometres (by road) north of the city centre. The Auckland Northern Motorway and Orewa River form its western and northern boundaries respectively.

Millwater was built on former farmland in 2005. Development is expected to be complete in 2022, with an anticipated population of 10,000.

A companion suburb of Milldale is intended on the other side of the Northern Motorway, and this will include a new primary school for the area.

== Demographics ==
Millwater covers 4.17 km^{2} (1.61 sq mi) and had an estimated population of 8,790 as of June 2025, with a population density of 2,108 people per km^{2}.

Historical population
Year	Pop.	±% p.a.
2006	99	—
2013	867	+36.34%
2018	5,946	+46.97%
2023	7,947	+5.97%

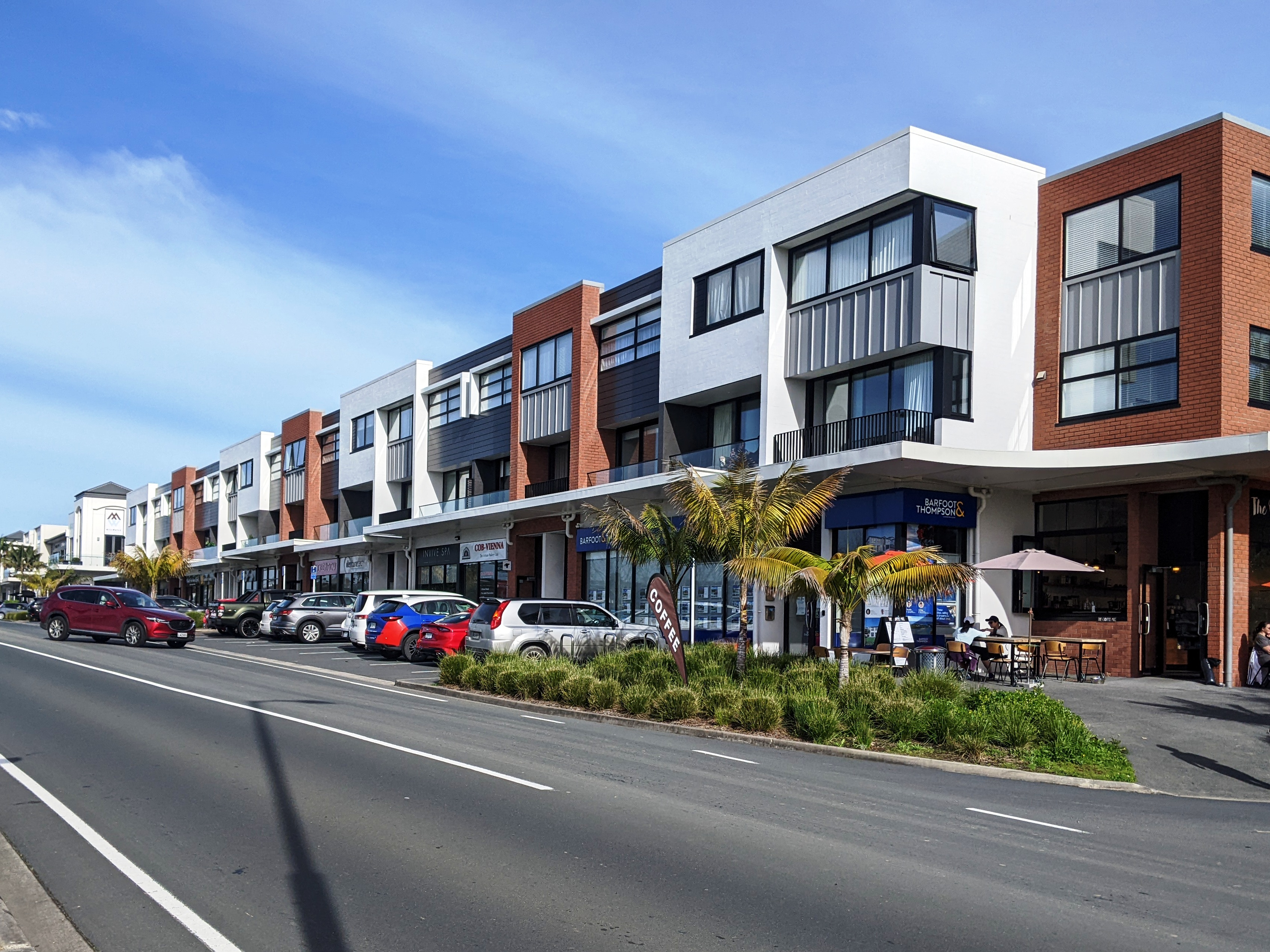
Millwater shopping area

Millwater had a population of 7,947 in the 2023 New Zealand census, an increase of 2,001 people (33.7%) since the 2018 census, and an increase of 7,080 people (816.6%) since the 2013 census. There were 3,933 males, 3,993 females and 21 people of other genders in 2,382 dwellings. 2.2% of people identified as LGBTIQ+. There were 2,055 people (25.9%) aged under 15 years, 1,203 (15.1%) aged 15 to 29, 3,891 (49.0%) aged 30 to 64, and 804 (10.1%) aged 65 or older.

People could identify as more than one ethnicity. The results were 64.3% European (Pākehā); 5.7% Māori; 1.2% Pasifika; 33.4% Asian; 2.5% Middle Eastern, Latin American and African New Zealanders (MELAA); and 1.7% other, which includes people giving their ethnicity as "New Zealander". English was spoken by 93.0%, Māori language by 0.6%, and other languages by 35.0%. No language could be spoken by 2.2% (e.g. too young to talk). New Zealand Sign Language was known by 0.1%. The percentage of people born overseas was 50.5, compared with 28.8% nationally.

Religious affiliations were 37.9% Christian, 2.8% Hindu, 1.1% Islam, 0.1% Māori religious beliefs, 1.5% Buddhist, 0.1% New Age, 0.2% Jewish, and 0.9% other religions. People who answered that they had no religion were 49.7%, and 5.8% of people did not answer the census question.

Of those at least 15 years old, 1,647 (28.0%) people had a bachelor's or higher degree, 2,436 (41.3%) had a post-high school certificate or diploma, and 1,299 (22.0%) people exclusively held high school qualifications. 1,482 people (25.2%) earned over $100,000 compared to 12.1% nationally. The employment status of those at least 15 was that 3,378 (57.3%) people were employed full-time, 852 (14.5%) were part-time, and 108 (1.8%) were unemployed.

Individual statistical areas
Name	Area (km^{2})	Population	Density (per km^{2})	Dwellings	Median age	Median income
Millwater Central	1.75	3,660	2,091	1,170	39.4 years	$55,000
Millwater South	2.42	4,287	1,771	1,212	35.3 years	$55,000
New Zealand					38.1 years	$41,500
