= Fairview Heights =

Fairview Heights may refer to:

== In the United States ==
- Fairview Heights, Illinois
  - Fairview Heights (St. Louis MetroLink)
- Fairview Heights, Virginia
- Fairview Heights station (Los Angeles Metro)

== In New Zealand ==
- Fairview Heights, New Zealand
