= Milldale, New Zealand =

Milldale
- Suburb
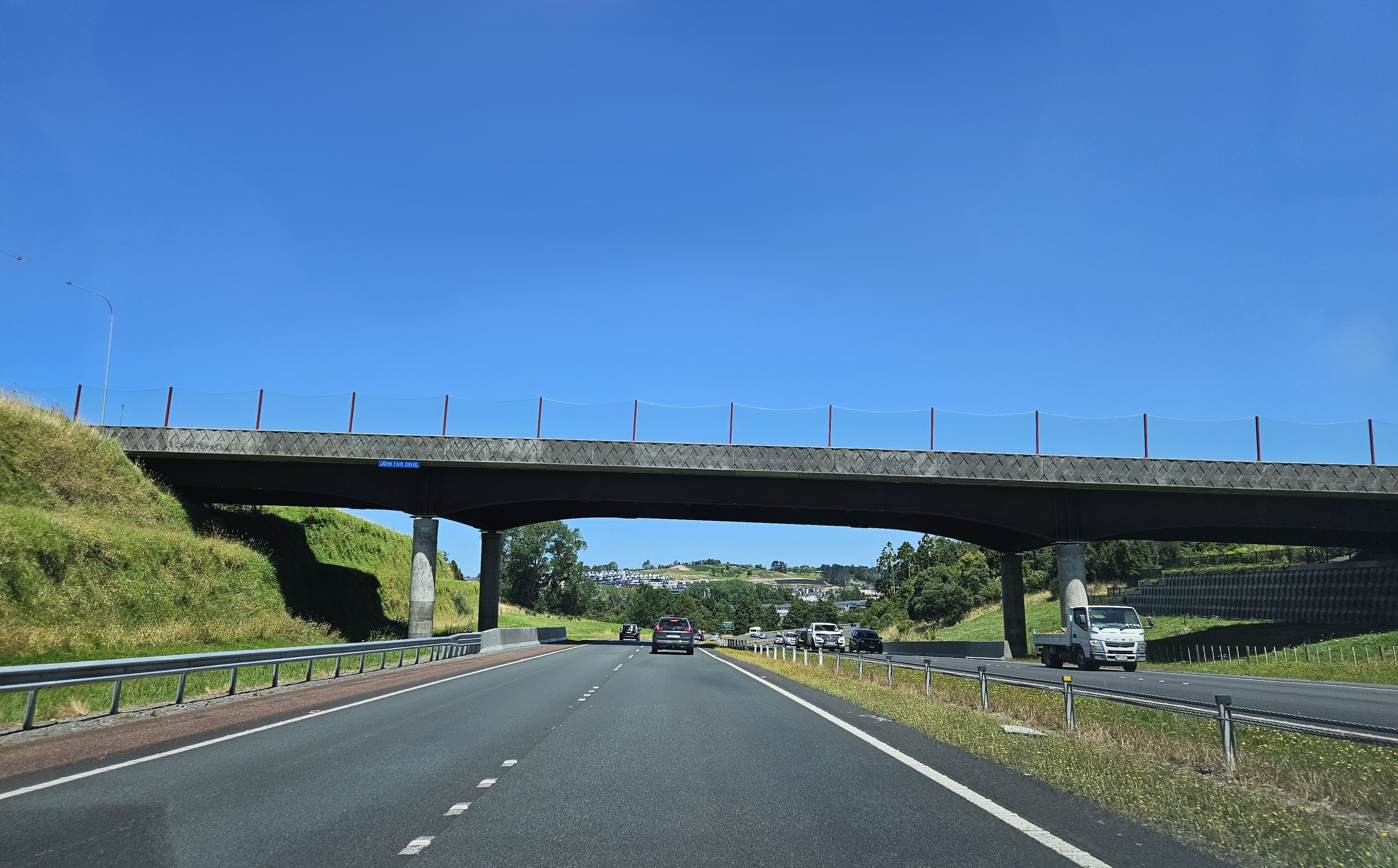
- Highgate Bridge, connecting Silverdale and Milldale across the Auckland Northern Motorway
- Interactive map of Milldale
- Coordinates: 36.61299°S 174.65257°E
- Country: New Zealand
- City: Auckland
- Local authority: Auckland Council
- Electoral ward: Rodney Ward
- Local board: Rodney Local Board
- Board subdivision: Dairy Flat

Area
  - Land: 522 ha (1,290 acres)

Population (June 2025)
  - Total: 3,170
  - Density: 607/km^{2} (1,570/sq mi)
- Postcode: 0932

	Puhoi	Orewa
Wainui	Milldale	Millwater
	Dairy Flat	Silverdale

Milldale is a suburb of Auckland, 33 kilometres north of the city centre. The Auckland Northern Motorway forms its eastern boundary. Construction of the suburb began in 2019, and will take approximately 12 years to complete.

The development, which is planned to accommodate 4500 new dwellings on a 300 hectare site includes a town centre, schools and a retirement village

In 2022, the developer of the suburb, Fulton Hogan, purchased a further 191 hectares of farmland adjacent to Milldale, known as Longburn Farm.

== Demographics ==
Milldale covers 5.22 km^{2} (2.02 sq mi) and had an estimated population of 3,170 as of June 2025, with a population density of 607 people per km^{2}.

Historical population
Year	Pop.	±% p.a.
2013	162	—
2018	147	−1.92%
2023	2,238	+72.39%

Milldale had a population of 2,238 in the 2023 New Zealand census, an increase of 2,091 people (1422.4%) since the 2018 census, and an increase of 2,076 people (1281.5%) since the 2013 census. There were 1,107 males, 1,125 females and 3 people of other genders in 708 dwellings. 2.5% of people identified as LGBTIQ+. The median age was 33.2 years (compared with 38.1 years nationally). There were 627 people (28.0%) aged under 15 years, 339 (15.1%) aged 15 to 29, 1,155 (51.6%) aged 30 to 64, and 114 (5.1%) aged 65 or older.

People could identify as more than one ethnicity. The results were 62.9% European (Pākehā); 5.4% Māori; 1.6% Pasifika; 32.6% Asian; 3.2% Middle Eastern, Latin American and African New Zealanders (MELAA); and 2.1% other, which includes people giving their ethnicity as "New Zealander". English was spoken by 93.0%, Māori language by 0.7%, Samoan by 0.3%, and other languages by 37.5%. No language could be spoken by 4.0% (e.g. too young to talk). New Zealand Sign Language was known by 0.1%. The percentage of people born overseas was 56.2, compared with 28.8% nationally.

Religious affiliations were 39.9% Christian, 5.1% Hindu, 0.8% Islam, 0.1% Māori religious beliefs, 2.3% Buddhist, 0.1% New Age, and 1.1% other religions. People who answered that they had no religion were 46.2%, and 4.2% of people did not answer the census question.

Of those at least 15 years old, 531 (33.0%) people had a bachelor's or higher degree, 642 (39.9%) had a post-high school certificate or diploma, and 312 (19.4%) people exclusively held high school qualifications. The median income was $71,500, compared with $41,500 nationally. 480 people (29.8%) earned over $100,000 compared to 12.1% nationally. The employment status of those at least 15 was that 1,155 (71.7%) people were employed full-time, 174 (10.8%) were part-time, and 42 (2.6%) were unemployed.

== Education ==
Ahutoetoe School is a coeducational contributing primary (years 1–6) school with a roll of 294 as of October 2025. The school was established in 2023 in temporary premises, and moved to its current site in 2024.
