= Oteha =

- Suburb
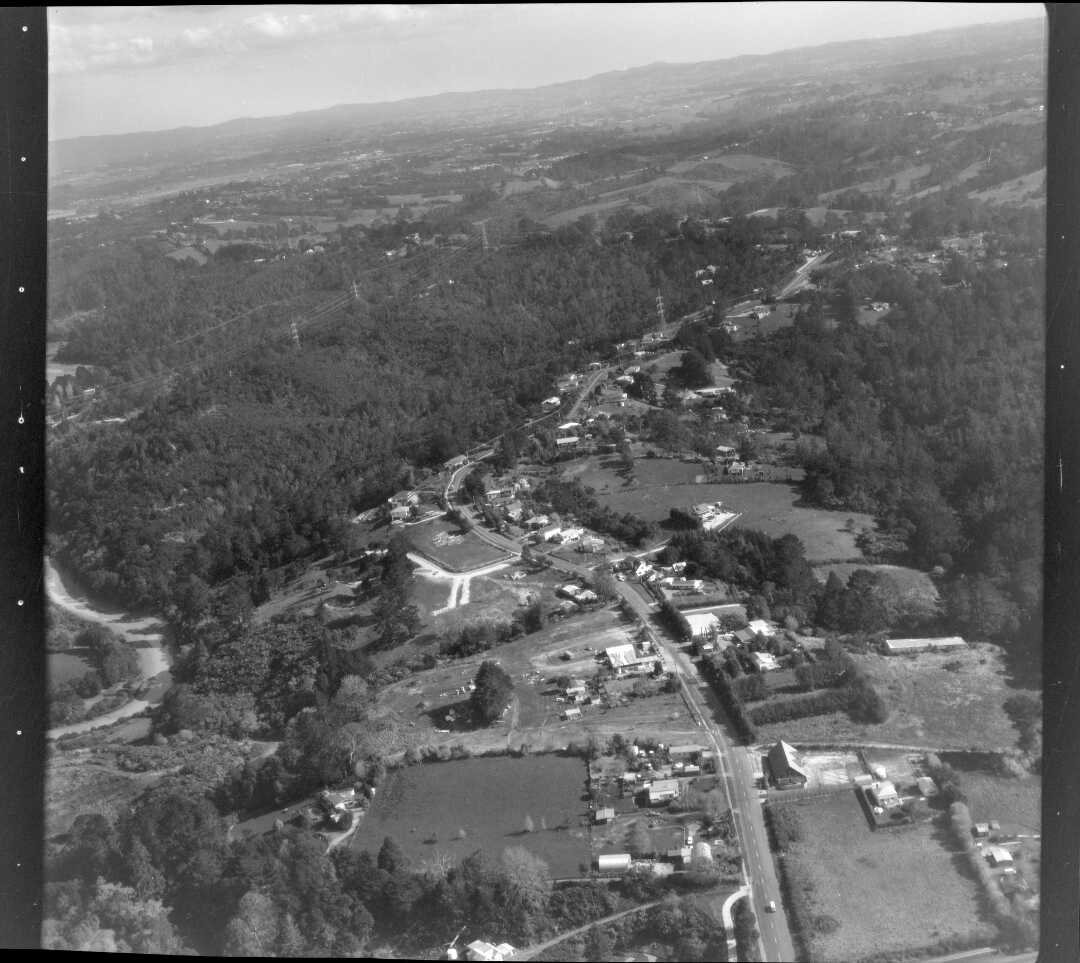
- Historic Aerial view of Oteha
- Interactive map of Oteha
- Coordinates: 36.718°S 174.717°E
- Country: New Zealand
- City: Auckland
- Local authority: Auckland Council
- Electoral ward: Albany ward
- Local board: Upper Harbour Local Board

Area
  - Land: 129 ha (320 acres)

Population (June 2025)
  - Total: 5,870
  - Density: 4,550/km^{2} (11,800/sq mi)
- Postcode: 0632

Dairy Flat	Fairview Heights	Northcross
Albany	Oteha	Browns Bay
Albany	Pinehill	Rothesay Bay

Oteha is an Auckland suburb, which is under local governance of Auckland Council. The area is defined by Oteha Valley Road on the north, East Coast Road on the east, Spencer Road on the south, and the Auckland Northern Motorway on the west.

== Demographics ==
Oteha covers 1.29 km^{2} (0.50 sq mi) and had an estimated population of 5,870 as of June 2025, with a population density of 4,550 people per km^{2}.

Historical population
Year	Pop.	±% p.a.
2006	3,033	—
2013	4,506	+5.82%
2018	5,112	+2.56%
2023	5,379	+1.02%

Oteha had a population of 5,379 in the 2023 New Zealand census, an increase of 267 people (5.2%) since the 2018 census, and an increase of 873 people (19.4%) since the 2013 census. There were 2,607 males, 2,757 females and 15 people of other genders in 1,749 dwellings. 3.2% of people identified as LGBTIQ+. The median age was 35.9 years (compared with 38.1 years nationally). There were 1,089 people (20.2%) aged under 15 years, 1,074 (20.0%) aged 15 to 29, 2,616 (48.6%) aged 30 to 64, and 603 (11.2%) aged 65 or older.

People could identify as more than one ethnicity. The results were 33.2% European (Pākehā); 3.2% Māori; 1.5% Pasifika; 62.6% Asian; 3.8% Middle Eastern, Latin American and African New Zealanders (MELAA); and 2.0% other, which includes people giving their ethnicity as "New Zealander". English was spoken by 85.7%, Māori language by 0.5%, Samoan by 0.1%, and other languages by 55.4%. No language could be spoken by 2.0% (e.g. too young to talk). New Zealand Sign Language was known by 0.2%. The percentage of people born overseas was 67.4, compared with 28.8% nationally.

Religious affiliations were 33.5% Christian, 3.0% Hindu, 2.2% Islam, 2.7% Buddhist, 0.1% New Age, 0.1% Jewish, and 0.9% other religions. People who answered that they had no religion were 52.6%, and 5.0% of people did not answer the census question.

Of those at least 15 years old, 1,347 (31.4%) people had a bachelor's or higher degree, 1,524 (35.5%) had a post-high school certificate or diploma, and 1,104 (25.7%) people exclusively held high school qualifications. The median income was $43,000, compared with $41,500 nationally. 534 people (12.4%) earned over $100,000 compared to 12.1% nationally. The employment status of those at least 15 was that 2,319 (54.1%) people were employed full-time, 549 (12.8%) were part-time, and 120 (2.8%) were unemployed.

Individual statistical areas
Name	Area (km^{2})	Population	Density (per km^{2})	Dwellings	Median age	Median income
Oteha East	0.76	3,090	4,066	1,086	37.2 years	$44,700
Oteha West	0.53	2,289	4,319	666	34.3 years	$40,800
New Zealand					38.1 years	$41,500

== Education ==
Oteha Valley School is a coeducational contributing primary school (years 1–6) with a roll of 510 students as at July 2026. The school opened in 2004.

City Impact Church School is a composite school (years 1–13), with a roll of 351 students as at July 2026. It is a private Christian school.
