= Stillwater, New Zealand =

Stillwater, New Zealand, may refer to:

- Stillwater, Auckland
- Stillwater, West Coast
