= Surfing in New Zealand =

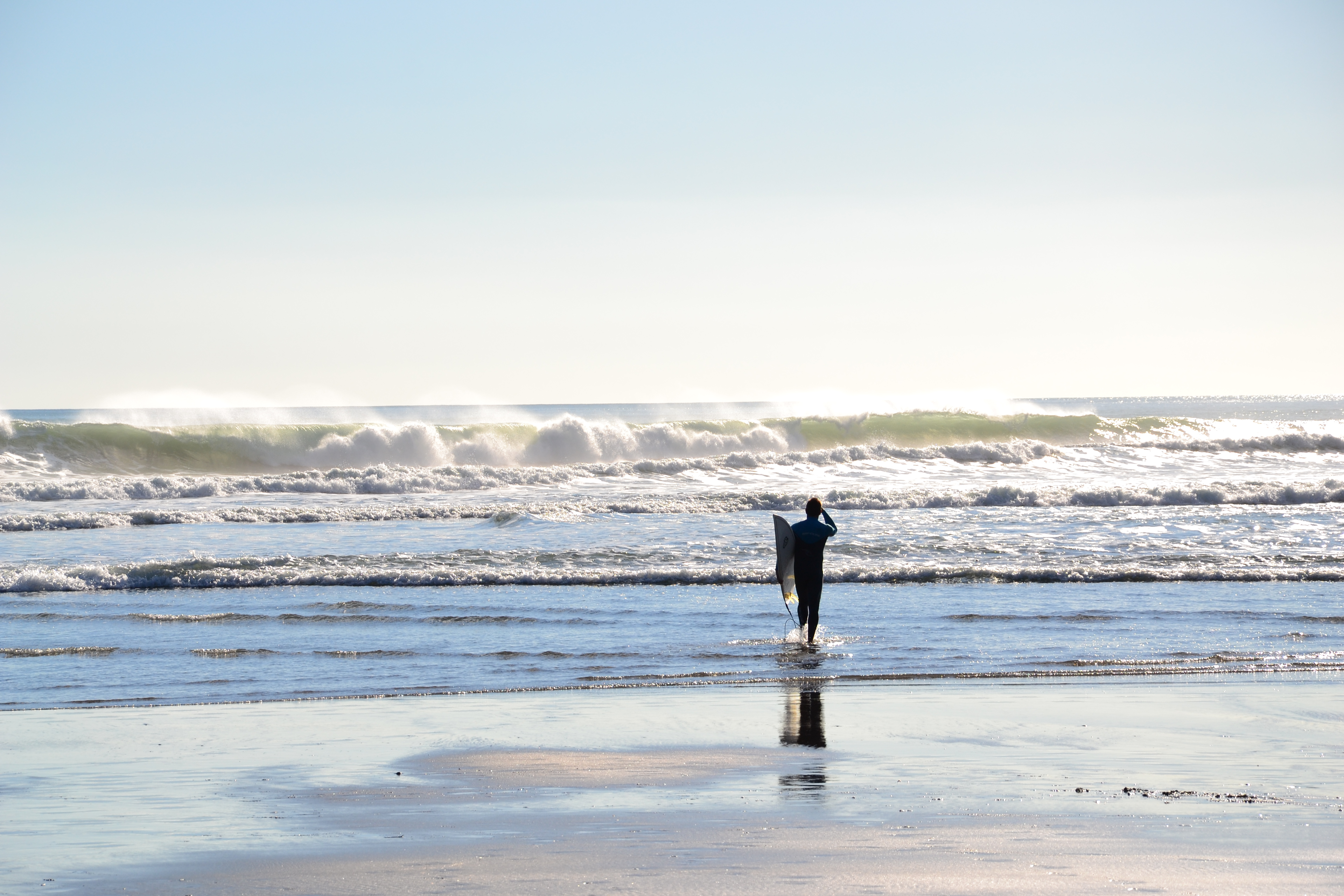
- Lone surfer on Piha Beach, Auckland, NZ
- Country: New Zealand
- Governing body: Surfing New Zealand
- National team: New Zealand Surf Team
- Clubs: 64

National competitions
- New Zealand National Surfing Championships

International competitions
- Oceania Surfing Cup; World Surfing Championships; Summer Olympics

New Zealand is a popular surfing destination, with a long history of the sport and a varied coastline with locations suitable for all types of surfing. The West coast is notably consistent, with big swells and high winds, whereas the east coast is dominated by cyclone season swells; the North island is notably warmer than the South, but less consistent; mean temperatures range from 7 °C to 20 °C, depending on location and time of year. Winter is more consistent than Summer, with a southeasterly swell. The climate of New Zealand is varied, so different surf conditions are encountered across the islands.

== History ==
Surfing was a part of Māori culture before the arrival of European settlers in the 19th century. The practice was called whakahekeheke, and was carried out using a variety of craft, including boards, or kopapa, and even bags of southern bull-kelp (pōhā). The influence of Christian missionaries led to a noted decline in surfing.

It was later revived following a tour of New Zealand by Hawai'ian surfer Duke Kahanamoku in 1915, when he gave demonstrations to locals. By the 1920s and 1930s, New Zealanders were surfing using solid wooden boards.

Surfing was utilised in the Surf Lifesaving movement, which used heavy hollow longboards to paddle through the surf. Imported magazines in the 1950s contained plans for longboards, which were improved upon to incorporate features such as a rocker and fin. These boards helped attracted younger members to lifesaving.

Up until this point, surfing consisted of riding the wave in a straight line perpendicular to the beach. In 1958, two American lifeguards, Bing Copeland and Rick Stoner, came to stay at Piha Surf Lifesaving Club and introduced the concept of surfing across the face of the wave on a smaller board. Copeland and Stoner also helped locals to make copies of their boards, introducing modern surfing and surfboards to New Zealand. These new surfing techniques put more emphasis on the surf conditions, causing surfers to go in search of better locations and conditions, resulting in a decline in the number of surfing lifesavers.

In 1963 the first National Surfing Championships was held at Mount Maunganui, followed by the establishment of the New Zealand Surf Riders' Association. In 1966, New Zealand sent its first representative team to the World Surfing Championships in San Diego. By the late 1960s, more surfboard builders were setting up business, using improved technology which resulted in shorter boards. This allowed for greater speed in executing turns and cutbacks. Conflict between surfers and the New Zealand Surf Lifesaving Association over the safety of surfing in close proximity to swimmers was partially resolved by the introduction of "surf lanes" and leg ropes.

== Governing body ==
Surfing New Zealand is the governing body for the sport of surfing in New Zealand. It was established in 1963, and is involved in the organisation of competitions, the development of local training programmes and the education of surfing coaches and judges.

== Māori and surfing ==
Water sports were popular in Māori culture, and considered important for ensuring children were comfortable in water.

There are a number of modern surfing clubs and championships which cater to Māori surfers. The Auahi Kore Māori Titles, held since 1992, is a national surfing championship open to Māori contestants in eight categories. The Auahi Kore Aotearoa Māori Surfing Team compete in the Oceania Surfing Cup, an international surfing championship for indigenous nations of the South Pacific.

== Big-wave surfing ==
There are limited sites for big-wave surfing in New Zealand, with one exception being the area around Papatowai on the Catlins Coast in the southern South Island.

The best surf spots in New Zealand are,

1. Raglan (North Island)

2. Taranaki

3. Piha Beach

4. Shipwreck Bay

5. Kaikoura

6. Dunedin and Otago Peninsula

== Culture ==
As surfing grew in popularity, the search for the best available conditions led to certain towns and cities becoming centres of the sport, with a distinctive New Zealand surfing culture arising in these areas. These include Raglan, Mt Maunganui and Gisborne in the North Island and Saint Clair and Sumner in the South Island.

Raglan is particularly known for its consistent surf, and many people visit the small town to learn surfing from one of the local surf schools.

There are currently several proposals to construct artificial surfing lagoons, including the Auckland Surf Park, Swell Planet and the Kaiapoi Aquasports Park.

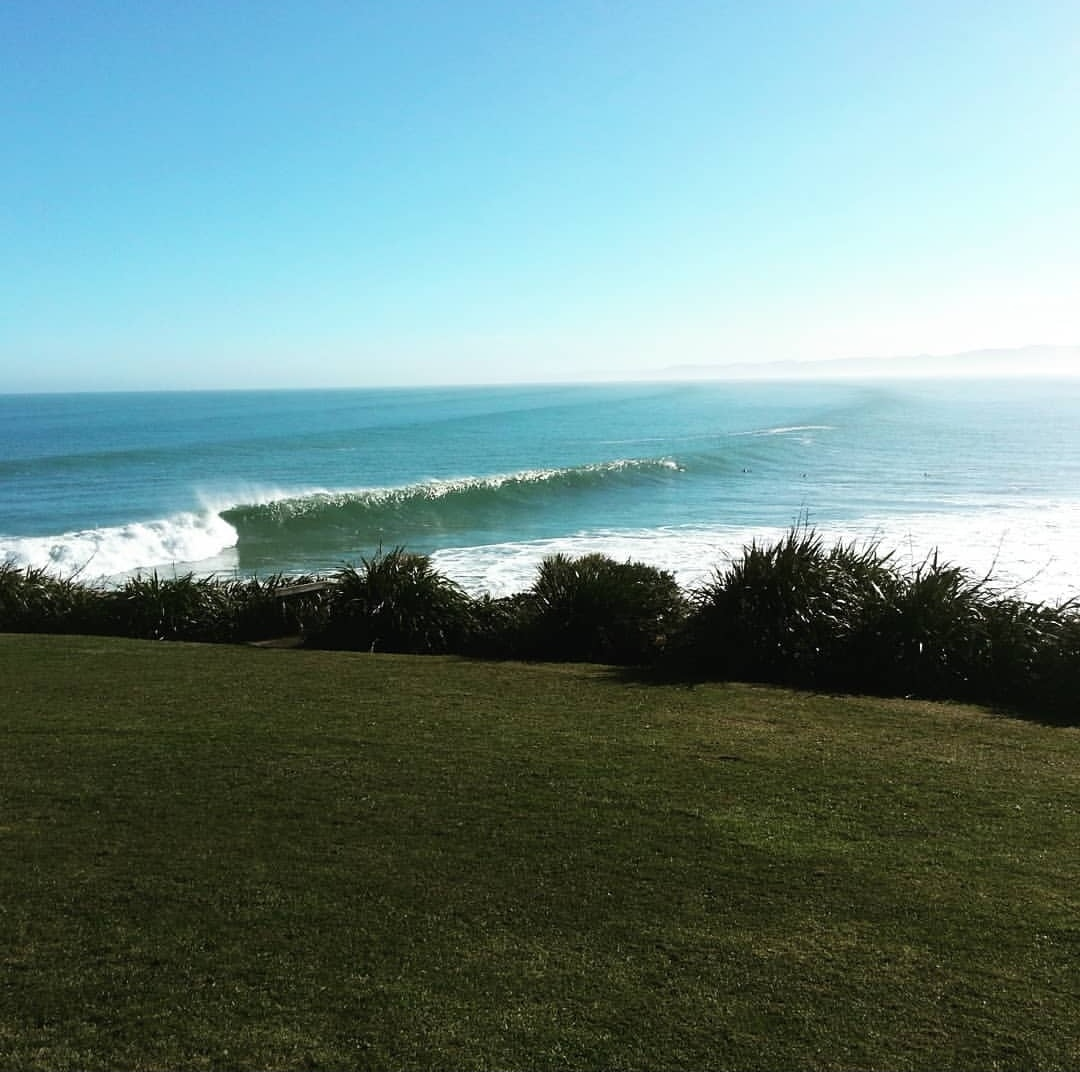
Manu Bay at Raglan

== Demographics ==
In 1963 there were approximately 300 surfers in the country, but this number grew to an estimated 15,000 by 1967, and estimated 240,000 today.

== See also ==
- Sport in New Zealand
- Surfing in Australia
- Surf Life Saving New Zealand
- Tourism in New Zealand
