= Redvale =

Redvale may refer to:

- Redvale, Colorado, United States
- Redvale, New Zealand

== See also ==
- Redvales
