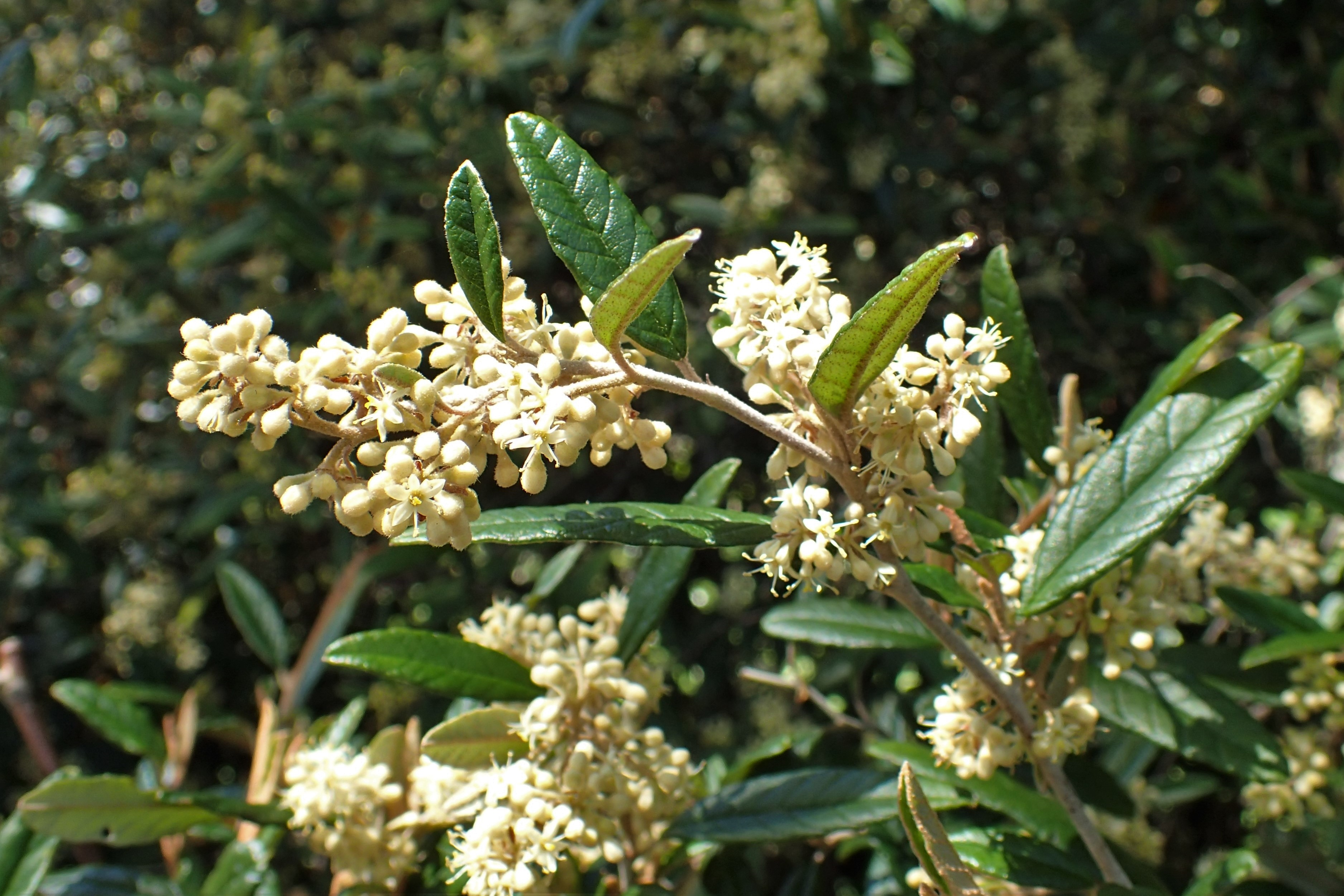

Conservation status
- Range Restricted (NZ TCS)

Scientific classification
- Kingdom: Plantae
- Clade: Tracheophytes
- Clade: Angiosperms
- Clade: Eudicots
- Clade: Rosids
- Order: Rosales
- Family: Rhamnaceae
- Genus: Pomaderris
- Species: P. rugosa

Binomial name
- Pomaderris rugosa Cheeseman, 1923

= Pomaderris rugosa =

Species of flowering plant

Pomaderris rugosa, wrinkle-leaved kūmaraho, or wrinkle-leaf pomaderris, is endemic to lowlands of the upper North Island of New Zealand. It is a widely spreading, much-branched shrub, with reddish hairy branches and narrow wrinkled narrow leaves, up to 6 cm (2.4 in) long and up to 1.4 cm (0.55 in) wide, which are dark green on top and pale-grey below. P. rugosa grows up to 3 m (9.8 ft), or sometimes 12 m (39 ft) and flowers mainly from October to December, with cream to yellow blossom, formed of many small clusters. Fruit is dry and small and present from November to May. P. rugosa is frost resistant.

It is classed as Naturally Uncommon, but is widespread, often in pine forests, and grows mostly in Coromandel and west coast of Firth of Thames, but is also present on the nearby islands of Rotoroa, Ponui, Mayor / Tūhua and around Aotea and Kāwhia Harbours. Further north, at Herekino and along the Weiti River it also grows, possibly having been introduced. It prefers poor soils, rock (especially Rhyolite) and estuaries.
