= Fairview Heights, New Zealand =

Fairview Heights
- Suburb
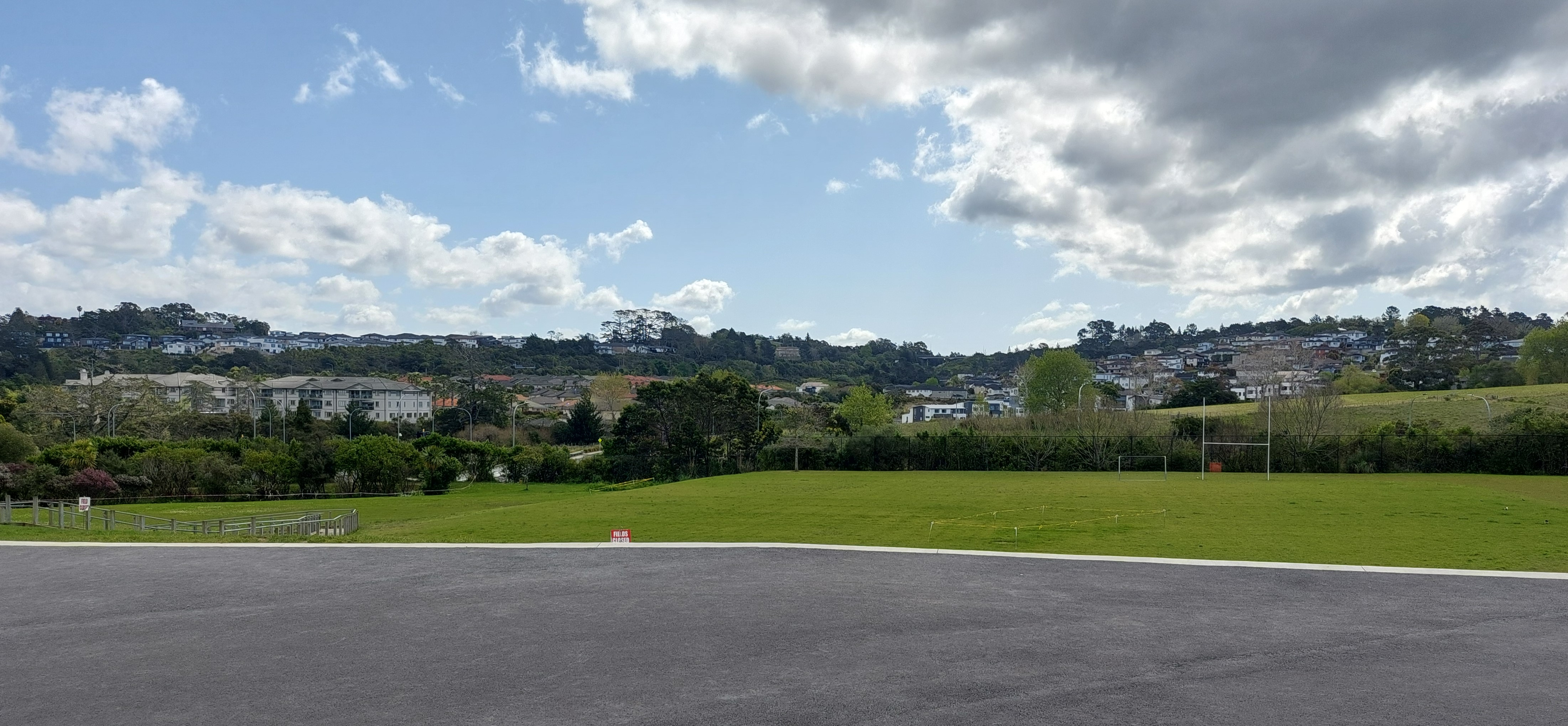
- View of Fairview Heights from Oteha
- Interactive map of Fairview Heights
- Coordinates: 36.710°S 174.715°E
- Country: New Zealand
- City: Auckland
- Local authority: Auckland Council
- Electoral ward: Albany ward
- Local board: Upper Harbour Local Board

Area
  - Land: 161 ha (400 acres)

Population (June 2025)
  - Total: 4,520
  - Density: 2,810/km^{2} (7,270/sq mi)
- Postcode: 0632

Redvale	Okura	Torbay Heights
Dairy Flat	Fairview Heights	Northcross
Albany	Oteha	Pinehill

Fairview Heights is a suburb located on the North Shore of Auckland, New Zealand. It is under local governance of Auckland Council. The area is defined by Lonely Track Road on the north, East Coast Road on the east, Oteha Valley Road on the south, and the Auckland Northern Motorway on the west. Until the end of the 20th century, the area was rural.

== Demographics ==
Fairview Heights covers 1.61 km^{2} (0.62 sq mi) and had an estimated population of 4,520 as of June 2025, with a population density of 2,807 people per km^{2}.

Historical population
Year	Pop.	±% p.a.
2006	1,116	—
2013	2,931	+14.79%
2018	3,897	+5.86%
2023	4,152	+1.28%

Fairview Heights had a population of 4,152 in the 2023 New Zealand census, an increase of 255 people (6.5%) since the 2018 census, and an increase of 1,221 people (41.7%) since the 2013 census. There were 2,028 males, 2,115 females and 6 people of other genders in 1,182 dwellings. 3.2% of people identified as LGBTIQ+. The median age was 35.7 years (compared with 38.1 years nationally). There were 741 people (17.8%) aged under 15 years, 903 (21.7%) aged 15 to 29, 1,884 (45.4%) aged 30 to 64, and 624 (15.0%) aged 65 or older.

People could identify as more than one ethnicity. The results were 34.4% European (Pākehā); 3.5% Māori; 2.1% Pasifika; 60.2% Asian; 4.2% Middle Eastern, Latin American and African New Zealanders (MELAA); and 1.9% other, which includes people giving their ethnicity as "New Zealander". English was spoken by 86.9%, Māori language by 0.8%, Samoan by 0.1%, and other languages by 52.1%. No language could be spoken by 2.2% (e.g. too young to talk). New Zealand Sign Language was known by 0.4%. The percentage of people born overseas was 64.0, compared with 28.8% nationally.

Religious affiliations were 26.1% Christian, 3.0% Hindu, 2.0% Islam, 0.1% Māori religious beliefs, 2.0% Buddhist, 0.1% New Age, and 1.4% other religions. People who answered that they had no religion were 60.2%, and 4.9% of people did not answer the census question.

Of those at least 15 years old, 1,071 (31.4%) people had a bachelor's or higher degree, 1,212 (35.5%) had a post-high school certificate or diploma, and 894 (26.2%) people exclusively held high school qualifications. The median income was $37,800, compared with $41,500 nationally. 429 people (12.6%) earned over $100,000 compared to 12.1% nationally. The employment status of those at least 15 was that 1,602 (47.0%) people were employed full-time, 378 (11.1%) were part-time, and 96 (2.8%) were unemployed.
