= Redvale, New Zealand =

Redvale
- Suburb
- Interactive map of Redvale
- Coordinates: 36.68250830°S 174.69641540°E
- Country: New Zealand
- City: Auckland
- Local authority: Auckland Council
- Electoral ward: Albany ward
- Local board: Hibiscus and Bays Local Board
- Postcode: 0932

Dairy Flat	Stillwater	Okura Bush
Coatesville	Redvale	Okura
Albany Heights	Fairview Heights	Torbay

Redvale is a settlement slightly north of the Auckland metropolitan area, in New Zealand. Part of it is located in the North Shore, and most of Redvale is rural. It is located north of Fairview Heights, and borders Lonely Track Road. State Highway 1 runs through parts of Redvale, and the suburb is located in Albany ward.

== Geography ==
The area of Redvale was a rural community in 1905. The Redvale Landfill is in neighbouring Dairy Flat, rather than in Redvale itself.
