= Orewa =

- Suburb
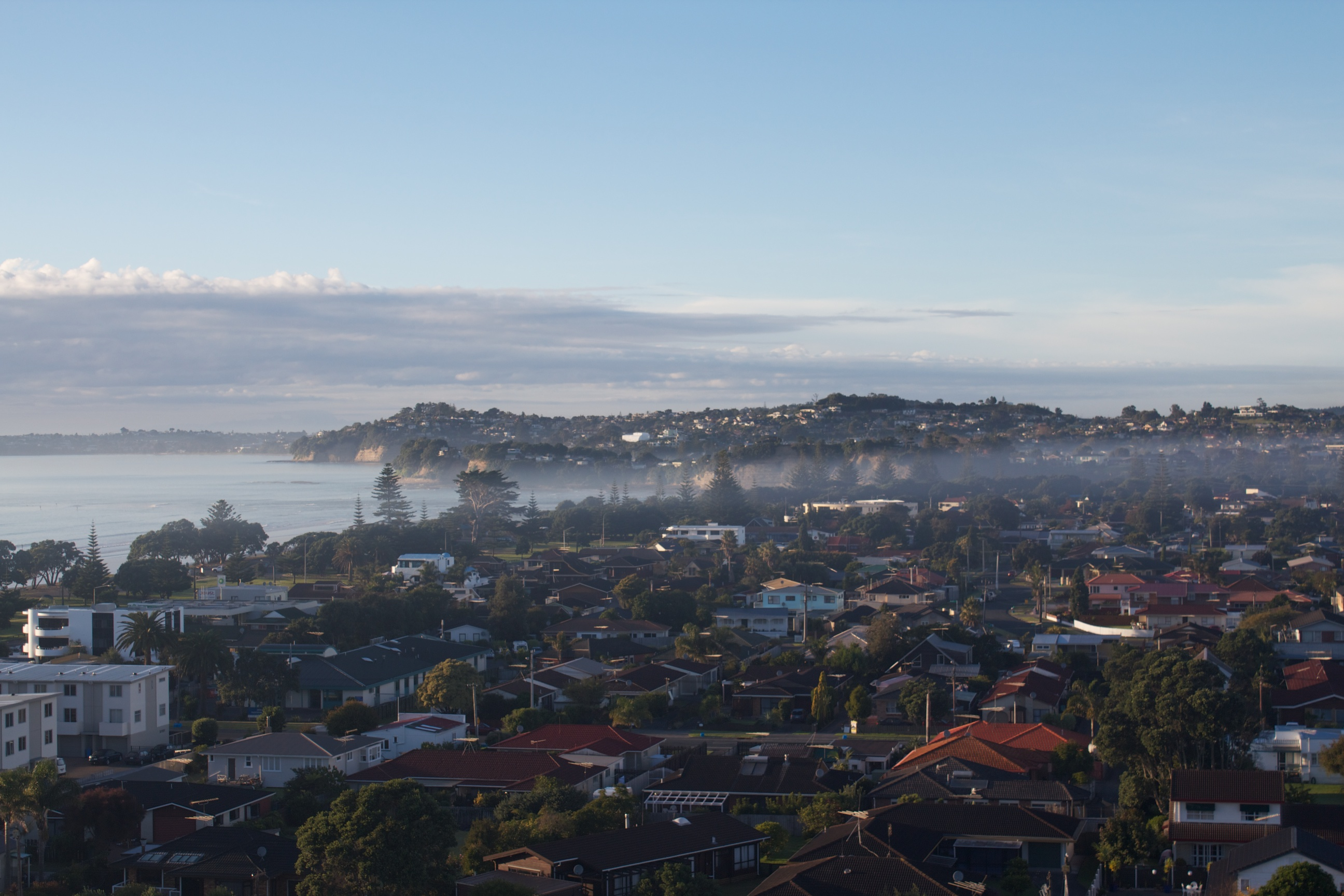
- Orewa township, looking south towards the Whangaparāoa Peninsula
- Interactive map of Orewa
- Coordinates: 36.585°S 174.695°E
- Country: New Zealand
- City: Auckland
- Local authority: Auckland Council
- Electoral ward: Albany ward
- Local board: Hibiscus and Bays

Area
  - Land: 716 ha (1,770 acres)

Population (June 2025)
  - Total: 14,030
  - Density: 1,960/km^{2} (5,080/sq mi)
- Postcode(s): 0931, 0932

Orewa (Māori: Ōrewa) is a settlement in the northern Auckland Region of New Zealand. It is a suburb of the Hibiscus Coast, just north of the base of the Whangaparāoa Peninsula and 40 kilometres (25 mi) north of central Auckland. The Northern Motorway, part of State Highway 1, passes just inland of Orewa and extends through the twin Johnston Hill tunnels to near Puhoi.

Tāmaki Māori settled in the Orewa area since at least the 13th century, utilising the resources of the Ōrewa River and Whangaparāoa Bay, where an important shark fishery was located. After the Kawerau warrior Maki unified many of the Tāmaki Māori people of the northern and western Auckland Region, his younger son Maraeariki settled along the Ōrewa River. Kawerau hapū, including Ngāti Kahu, lived in the Orewa area until the mid-19th century.

Orewa was a part of the Mahurangi Block, forest sold to the Crown in 1841. Kauri loggers and itinerant kauri gum diggers were among the first Europeans to come to Orewa, with the first permanent residents arriving in the 1840s and 1850s. Orewa House was constructed in 1856, becoming the de Jersey Grut family home for three generations, later run as a boarding house and accommodation by Alice and Edward Eaves. During the 1920s, Orewa became a popular destination for campers and holidayers.

Orewa rapidly developed suburban housing in the 1950s and 1960s, in part due to the opening of the Auckland Harbour Bridge, with the town centre and Hillary Square developing from 1953. Further major developments at Orewa occurred in the 1980s and 2000s, and Orewa became the administrative centre for the Rodney District from 1989 to 2010. The town gained national press in 2004 when National Party leader Don Brash gave the Orewa Speech, in which he discussed race relations between Māori and Pākehā.

== Etymology ==
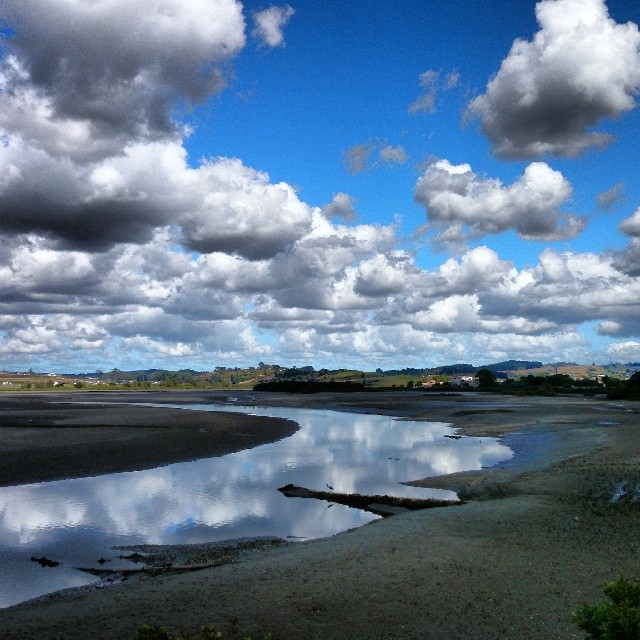
The settlement of Orewa takes its name from the adjacent Ōrewa River

The name Orewa was originally used to describe the Ōrewa River and estuary, and was later applied to the beach during European times. The etymology of Ōrewa is unknown, but the most likely origin is that it is a shortening of Te Wai-o-Rewa ("The Waters of Rewa"), referring to an early Kawerau rangatira called Rewa. References to the Ōrewa River in English date from at least the 1840s,

== Geography ==
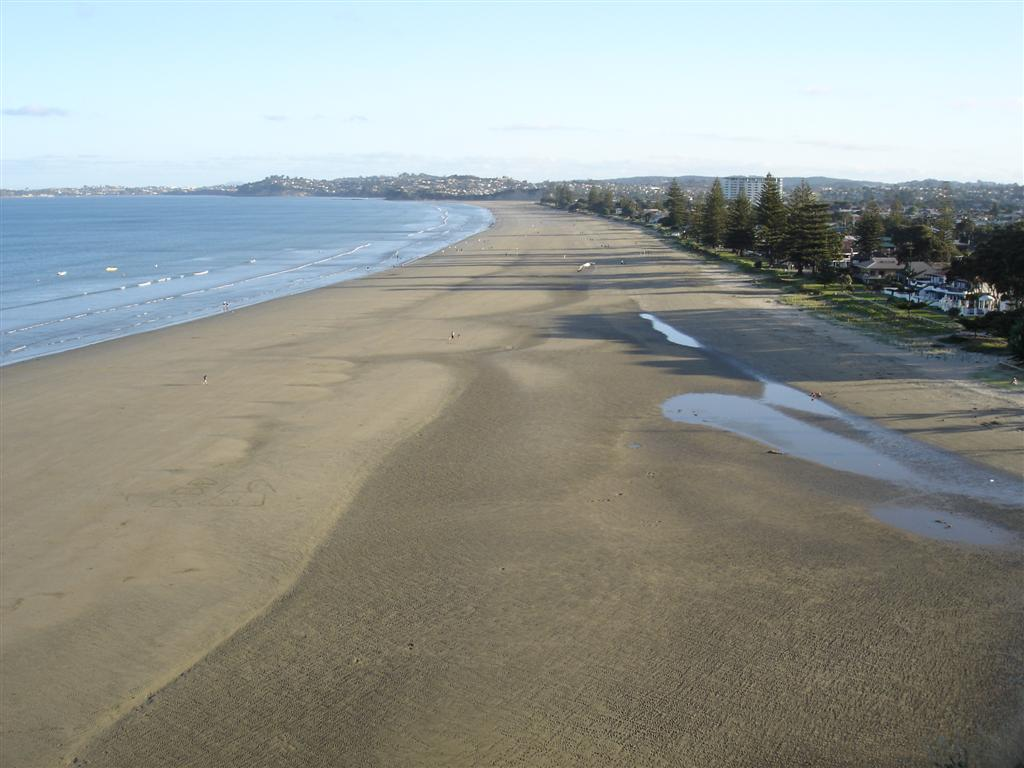
Ōrewa Beach, a major beach of Whangaparāoa Bay, lines the east of the township

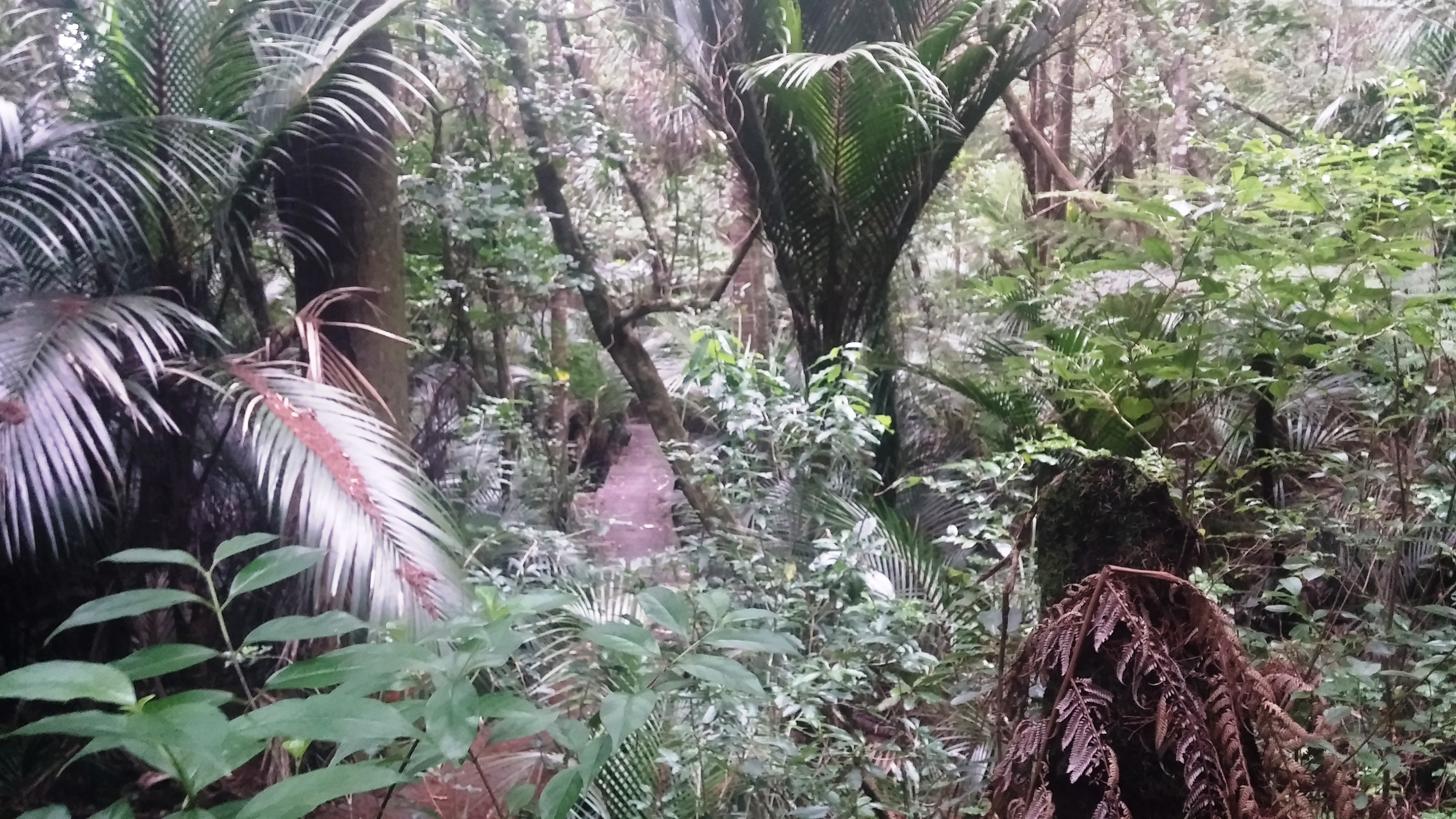
Alice Eaves Scenic Reserve features remnant kauri forests, including one tree estimated to be over 300 years old, and is also the location of Nukuhau, a Kawerau defensive pā

Orewa is a coastal town on the Hibiscus Coast, located on the northern shores of the Ōrewa River. Ōrewa Beach lines the eastern margin of the settlement, which is one of the major beaches surrounding Whangaparāoa Bay. The highest point in Orewa is an 134 metres (440 ft) hill in the Nukumea Scenic Reserve, from which the Nukumea Stream flows.

The beach settlement of Hatfields Beach is located to the north across the Nukumea Stream, South of Orewa heading towards the Whangaparāoa Peninsula is the suburb of Red Beach, and the Highgate and Millwater developments of Silverdale are located to the southwest.

Prior to human settlement, Orewa was primarily a kauri-dominated forest. By the 1840s, the Orewa beach was primarily sandhills, and likely had areas of peat swamp. Alice Eaves Scenic Reserve is an area of Orewa that includes remnant kauri forest, including one estimated to be over 300 years old.

=== Māori history ===
The Hibiscus Coast area has been settled since at least the 13th century, with many of the first Māori occupants identifying as Ngā Oho. The wider area between the Ōrewa River and Mahurangi River was traditionally known as Mahurangi, named after a pā located at the mouth of the Waiwera River. The Ōrewa River estuary features some of the most densely found archaeological sites in the area, and was an important sheltered harbour, which offered marine resources such as shellfish and flounder, and connections to inland walking routes. Portages, where waka could be hauled overland between waterways, connected the Hibiscus Coast area to the Kaipara Harbour in the west. The Aotoetoe portage travelled north between the Kaukapakapa River and the Ōrewa River.

Likely in the 17th century, the warrior Maki migrated from the Kāwhia Harbour to his ancestral home in the Auckland Region. Maki conquered and unified many of the Tāmaki Māori tribes as Te Kawerau ā Maki, including those of the North Shore and Hibiscus Coast. After Maki's death, his sons settled different areas of his lands, creating new hapū, including the wider Hibiscus Coast hapū of Ngāti Manuhiri, Ngāti Maraeariki, Ngāti Poataniwha and Ngāti Kahu.

Maki's younger son Maraeariki primarily settled at the head of the Ōrewa River. An island in the Ōrewa River adjacent to his kāinga, Te Motu-o-Marae-Ariki, was named in remembrance of him. His hapū Ngāti Maraeariki grew to occupy lands between Whangaparāoa and Ōmaha, while continuing to focus settlement at Orewa. By the mid-1700s, Marutūāhu tribes from the Hauraki Gulf, especially Ngāti Pāoa, sought to control the Whangaparāoa Bay shark fishery, and waged war against Ngāti Kahu, a hapū formed from Maki's granddaughter Kahu, who were primarily based on the Whangaparāoa Peninsula. During this period, Kawerau-descended hapū held exclusive land rights to the Hibiscus Coast area, while fishing rights were shared between Ngāti Kahu and Marutūāhu tribes.

Orewa is home to two known defensive pā sites: Nukuhau Pā at Alice Eaves Scenic Reserve above the Nukumea Stream, which was held by Kawerau-descendant hapū. The second is Orewa South Bridge Pa, at the southern mouth of the Orewa estuary. Traditional names recorded for the area include Nukumea, the stream to the north of Orewa, Wahakataka, the northern tributary of the Ōrewa River at Arran Hills and Te Rua Taniwha, at the western end of the Orewa estuary. Te Rua Taniwha is associated with Ngāti Whātua o Kaipara ancestor Pokopoko-whiti-te-ra, who was famed for having slain a taniwha here.

In September 1821 during the Musket Wars, a Ngāpuhi taua (war party) ventured south to avenge past losses against Ngāti Kahu in the 1790s. The Kawerau-descendant tribes were heavily defeated, and survivors fled to the Waikato, gradually returning in the 1830s. On return, Ngāti Kahu formed intertribal marriages with Ngāti Whātua o Kaipara, seasonally migrating between Orewa, Te Haruhi Bay and Ōkura. Naval officer Byron Drury recorded a settlement at the mouth of the Ōrewa River in 1853 called Poaheke, where the residents had been influenced by Wesleyan missionaries. Ngāti Kahu settlement at Whangaparāoa continued until the 1870s.

=== Early colonial era and holidaymakers ===
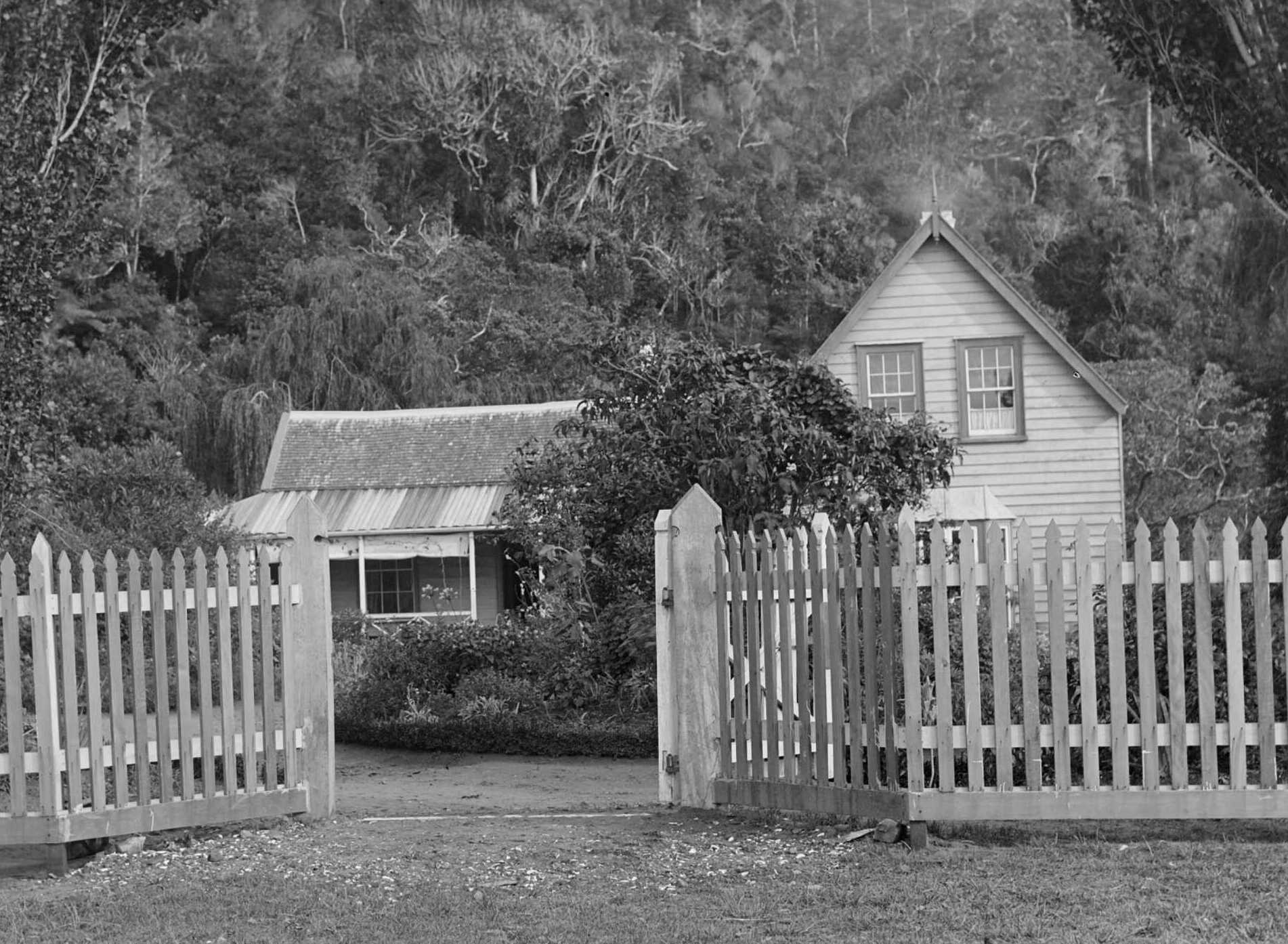
The de Grut family house at Orewa, pictured between 1880 and 1899. The house would later become a popular hotel, the Orewa House

Early kauri timber merchants were drawn to the Weiti River catchment to the south of Orewa by the late 1830s, The Ōrewa River catchment was used during the 1840s and 1850s to a lesser extent. Due to the former kauri forest, the Orewa area was a location that drew kauri gum diggers, who harvested the area until the early 20th century.

Following the signing of the Treaty of Waitangi in 1840, the Crown made the first purchases of the Mahurangi and Omaha blocks on 13 April 1841, which included Orewa. While some iwi and hapū with customary interests had been engaged, such as Ngāti Paoa and Ngāi Tai ki Tāmaki, others, including Te Kawerau ā Maki, Ngāti Manuhiri and Ngāti Rango, were not involved with transactions. This led to Ngāti Manuhiri being alienated from land on the Hibiscus Coast.

The earliest permanent European resident in Orewa is likely sawyer and boatbuilder John Ryan, who bought land in 1854 but had lived in the area since the 1840s. In the early 1850s, the Brunton family purchased land adjacent to the Orewa waterfall, establishing a home and jetty. The Brunton family constructed a bridge in 1880, and their house was home to the Orewa Falls post office.

In 1856, Captain Isaac Rhodes Cooper built Orewa House with the 58th (Rutlandshire) Regiment of Foot. This became the family residence of Channel Islands migrants, the de Jersey Gruts, in 1868, after the family struggled to establish a farm at Birkenhead. Orewa House was the de Jersey Grut home for three generations, becoming a commercial guest house in 1906. By the late 1880s, the clay road to Auckland was diverted to Wainui, leading the de Grut family to cut a road to Waiwera themselves.

In the latter 19th century as kauri gum deposits became rarer, land at Orewa was developed into orchards, where apples, pears, grapes and citrus fruit were grown for the Auckland market. Gradually the orchards were replaced by dairy farms in the 1920s, when fruit growing became economic.

In 1918, Francis Hitchins purchased the de Grut farm, selling Orewa House to Alice and Edward Eaves in 1919. Hitchins attempted to subdivide the farm, but land sales were disappointing, so onsold the farm to Dr. E. B. Gunson in the mid-1920s. Orewa became a popular destination for campers and holidayers in the 1920s, which led to the height of popularity of Orewa House. By the 1930s, coastal steamers were no longer the major form of transportation due to improved roading infrastructure, and in the 1940s Orewa Hall was constructed, where films were shown to the community.

=== Suburban development ===
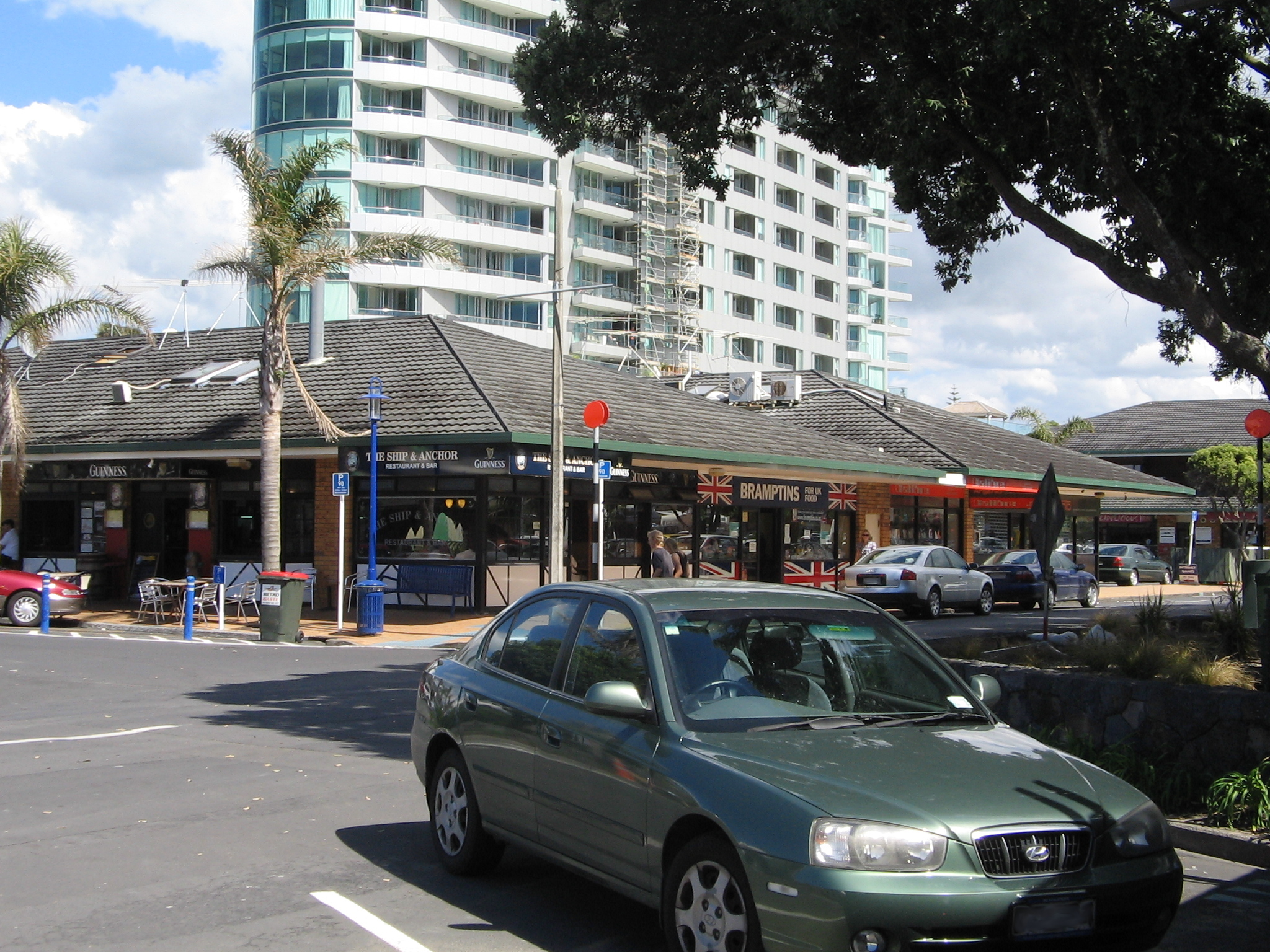
Shops in Orewa town centre, with the Nautilus apartment building in the background

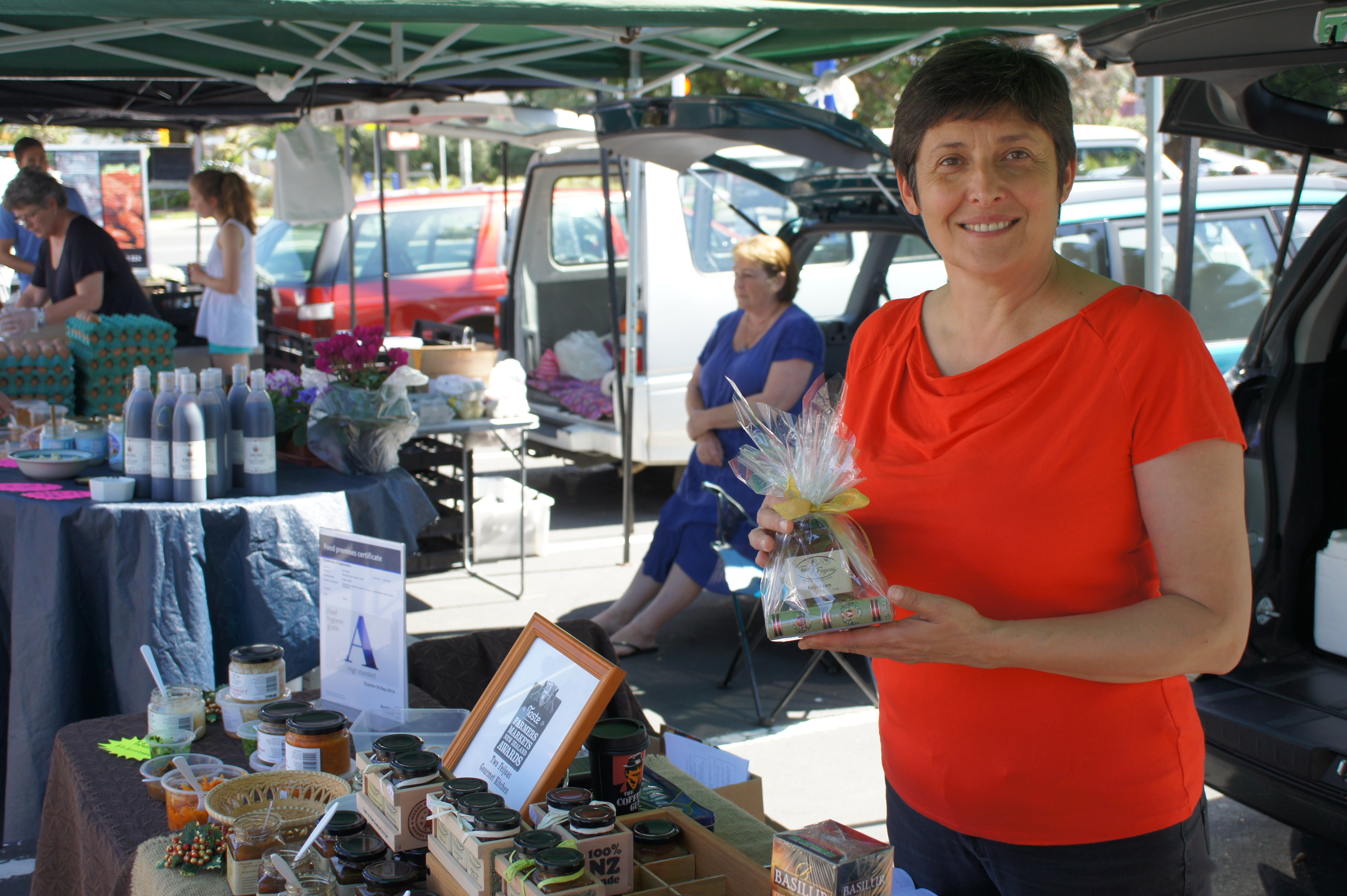
Orewa Market

Orewa was subdivided for suburban housing in the 1950s. The Orewa town centre was developed in 1953, which included a shopping precinct and Hillary Square. The square is named after Sir Edmund Hillary, whose family owned a holiday bach at Orewa, where he stayed in summers in the 1930s. This period saw the establishment of the Orewa Surf Life Saving Club in 1950, and the Orewa Bowling Club in 1952. In 1957, the Orewa Skating Rink was constructed. The rink developed into an entertainment precinct for the Hibiscus Coast in the 1960s, including a minigolf range and concert space. The rink was demolished in 1983.

Orewa experienced a building and population boom in the 1960s, due to the opening of the Auckland Harbour Bridge, rapidly urbanising between 1964 and 1975. In 1966, Alice Eaves Scenic Reserve was established on the former lands adjacent to Orewa House, after the Eaves family donated the land to the Waitemata County Council after Alice Eaves' death, and in the same year the Orewa Picture Theatre was constructed adjacent to Hillary Square.

In 1968, Alan Horobin opened Orewa Marineland, a home for rescue animals including chimpanzees, llamas, seals, dolphins and "Sid the Sea elephant". Marineland closed in 1978. The Orewa Combined Business Association formed in 1970. The Orewa Community Centre was constructed in 1972. Development of the northern shores of the Ōrewa River began in 1983 with further developed in 1995.

A 2.5-metre (8 ft 2 in) concrete statue by Marinus van Kooten of Sir Edmund Hillary was unveiled in Hillary Square in 1983. The statue degraded over time, and was replaced with a bronze statue by Chen Wei Ming in 1991. In 1990, the Centrestage Theatre was developed in Orewa by the United Players.

By the late 1990s, the Auckland Northern Motorway was extended to Orewa. This created a major link for the area back to the city. In 2004, a 12-storey apartment complex called the Nautilus was completed at Orewa. The only high rise building on the Hibiscus Coast, it is home to over 300 people, and in 2009 faced issues for being a leaky building.

Orewa made political headlines on 27 January 2004, when New Zealand National Party leader Don Brash, then the leader of the opposition in Parliament, gave what became known as the Orewa Speech in front of the local Rotary club on a theme of race relations in New Zealand and, in particular, the special status of Māori. He advocated 'one rule for all'.

In 2008, Kensington Park, the former site of the Orewa Caravan Park, was developed into a new housing area.

== Demographics ==
Historical population
Year	Pop.	±% p.a.
2006	7,371	—
2013	8,586	+2.20%
2018	10,242	+3.59%
2023	13,107	+5.06%
The 2006 population is for a smaller area of 6.80 km^{2}. Source:

Orewa covers 7.16 km^{2} (2.76 sq mi) and had an estimated population of 14,030 as of June 2025, with a population density of 1,959 people per km^{2}.

Orewa had a population of 13,107 in the 2023 New Zealand census, an increase of 2,865 people (28.0%) since the 2018 census, and an increase of 4,521 people (52.7%) since the 2013 census. There were 5,931 males, 7,140 females and 33 people of other genders in 5,433 dwellings. Of the people, 2.3% identified as LGBTIQ+. The median age was 51.4 years (compared with 38.1 years nationally). There were 1,893 people (14.4%) aged under 15 years, 1,515 (11.6%) aged 15 to 29, 5,163 (39.4%) aged 30 to 64, and 4,533 (34.6%) aged 65 or older.

People could identify as more than one ethnicity. The results were 81.4% European (Pākehā); 6.4% Māori; 2.6% Pasifika; 15.2% Asian; 1.9% Middle Eastern, Latin American and African New Zealanders (MELAA); and 2.2% other, which includes people giving their ethnicity as "New Zealander". English was spoken by 96.4%, Māori language by 0.8%, Samoan by 0.3%, and other languages by 19.8%. No language could be spoken by 1.5% (e.g. too young to talk). New Zealand Sign Language was known by 0.3%. The percentage of people born overseas was 39.8, compared with 28.8% nationally.

Religious affiliations were 41.9% Christian, 1.6% Hindu, 0.7% Islam, 0.1% Māori religious beliefs, 1.1% Buddhist, 0.4% New Age, 0.2% Jewish, and 1.3% other religions. People who answered that they had no religion were 46.1%, and 6.7% of people did not answer the census question.

Of those at least 15 years old, 2,199 (19.6%) people had a bachelor's or higher degree, 5,436 (48.5%) had a post–high school certificate or diploma, and 2,901 (25.9%) people exclusively held high school qualifications. The median income was $37,700, compared with $41,500 nationally; 1,671 people (14.9%) earned over $100,000 compared to 12.1% nationally. The employment status of those at least 15 was that 4,605 (41.1%) people were employed full-time, 1,401 (12.5%) were part-time, and 183 (1.6%) were unemployed.

Individual statistical areas
Name	Area (km^{2})	Population	Density (per km^{2})	Dwellings	Median age	Median income
Orewa West	1.50	810	540	243	35.5 years	$61,400
Orewa North	1.53	4,614	3,016	1,788	53.1 years	$37,600
Orewa Central	1.45	3,183	2,195	1,551	59.8 years	$34,600
Orewa South	1.38	3,024	2,191	1,407	60.1 years	$30,700
Millwater North	0.93	1,353	1,455	405	36.3 years	$59,600
Ara Hill	0.36	123	342	39	31.8 years	$81,400
New Zealand					38.1 years	$41,500

== Education ==
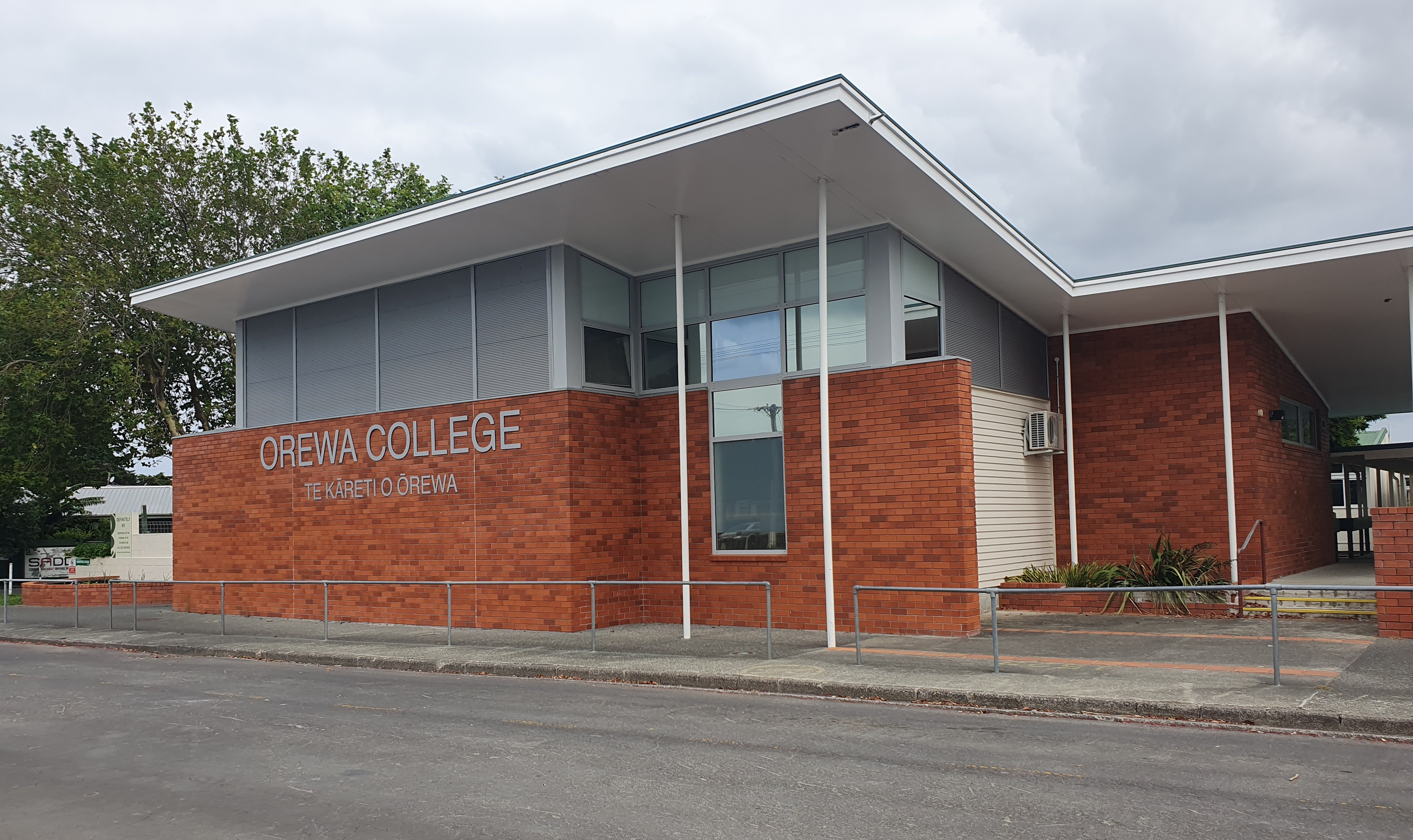
Orewa College

Orewa District High School was founded in 1956. In 1974, the school was split into Orewa School and Orewa College. Orewa Beach School was founded in 1978 (originally as Orewa North School), and another primary school opened at Red Beach to the south in 1988.

Orewa College is a secondary (years 7–13) school with a roll of 2,282 students.

Orewa School and Orewa Beach School are contributing primary (years 1–6) schools, with rolls of 379 students and 398 students respectively.

All three schools are coeducational. Rolls are as of July 2026.

== Local government ==
From 1877 until 1974, Orewa was administered by the Waitemata County, a large rural county north and west of the city of Auckland. In 1974 the county was dissolved, becoming part of Rodney County, them from 1989 to 2010 Rodney District. Orewa was the administrative centre for the Rodney District. The Rodney District was amalgamated into Auckland Council in November 2010, under a single unitary authority system.

Within the Auckland Council, Orewa is a part of the Hibiscus Coast subdivision of the Hibiscus and Bays local government area, governed by the Hibiscus and Bays Local Board. It is a part of the Albany ward, which elects two councillors to the Auckland Council.

== Bibliography ==
- [Destination Orewa Beach] (2021). Orewa: Then + Now. Destination Orewa Beach. ISBN 978-0-473-58724-6.
- Grover, Robin (1996). Alias the Wade: The Story of Silverdale, 1839–1853. ISBN 0473040026.
- Grover, Robin (2008). Why the Hibiscus? Place Names of the Hibiscus Coast. Silverdale Printing. ISBN 978-0-473-13484-6.
- Stone, R. C. J. (2001). From Tamaki-makau-rau to Auckland. Auckland University Press. ISBN 1869402596.
