= Alice Eaves Scenic Reserve =

Park in Auckland, New Zealand

Coordinates: 36°34′27″S 174°41′16″E

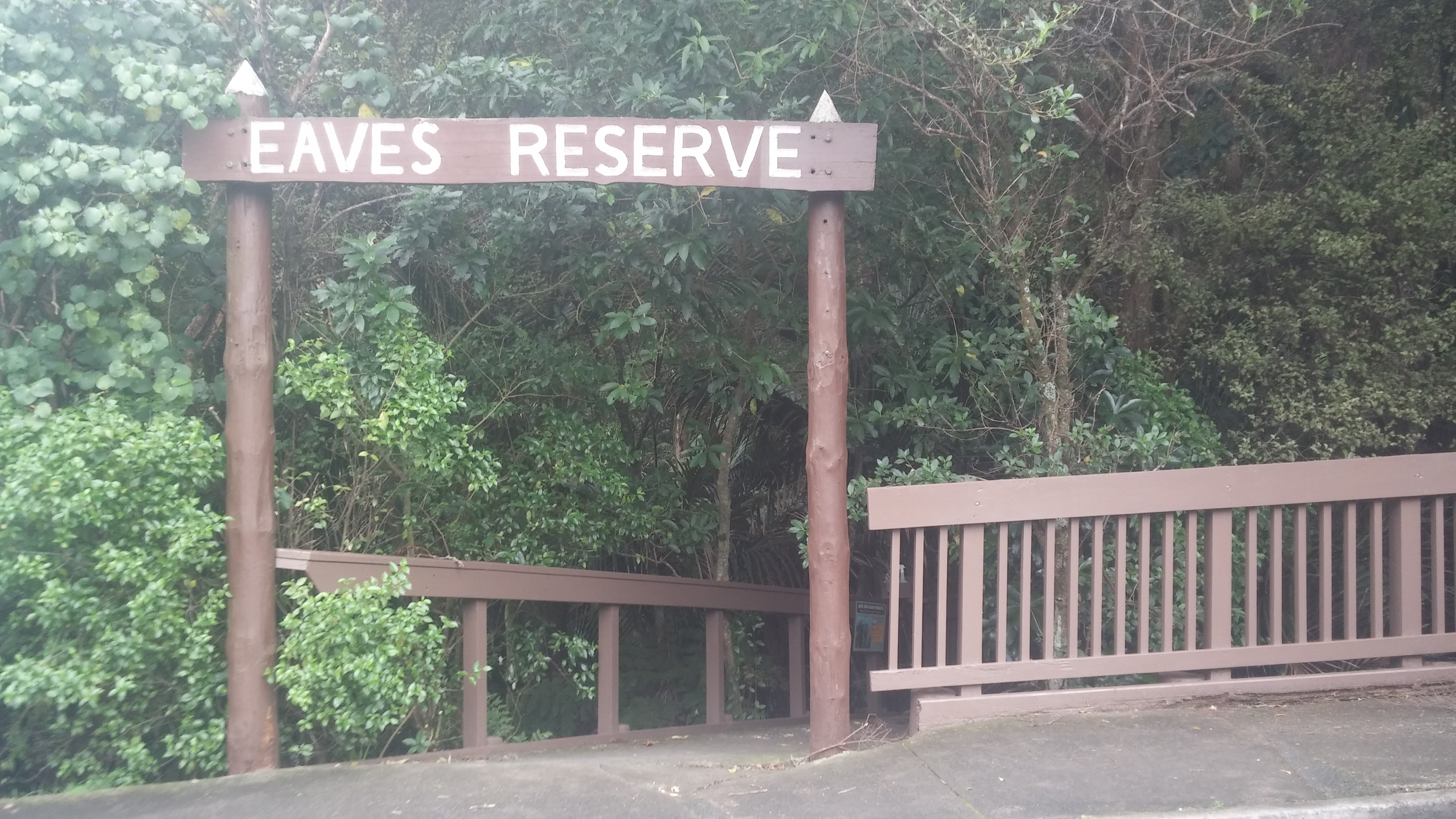
Entrance

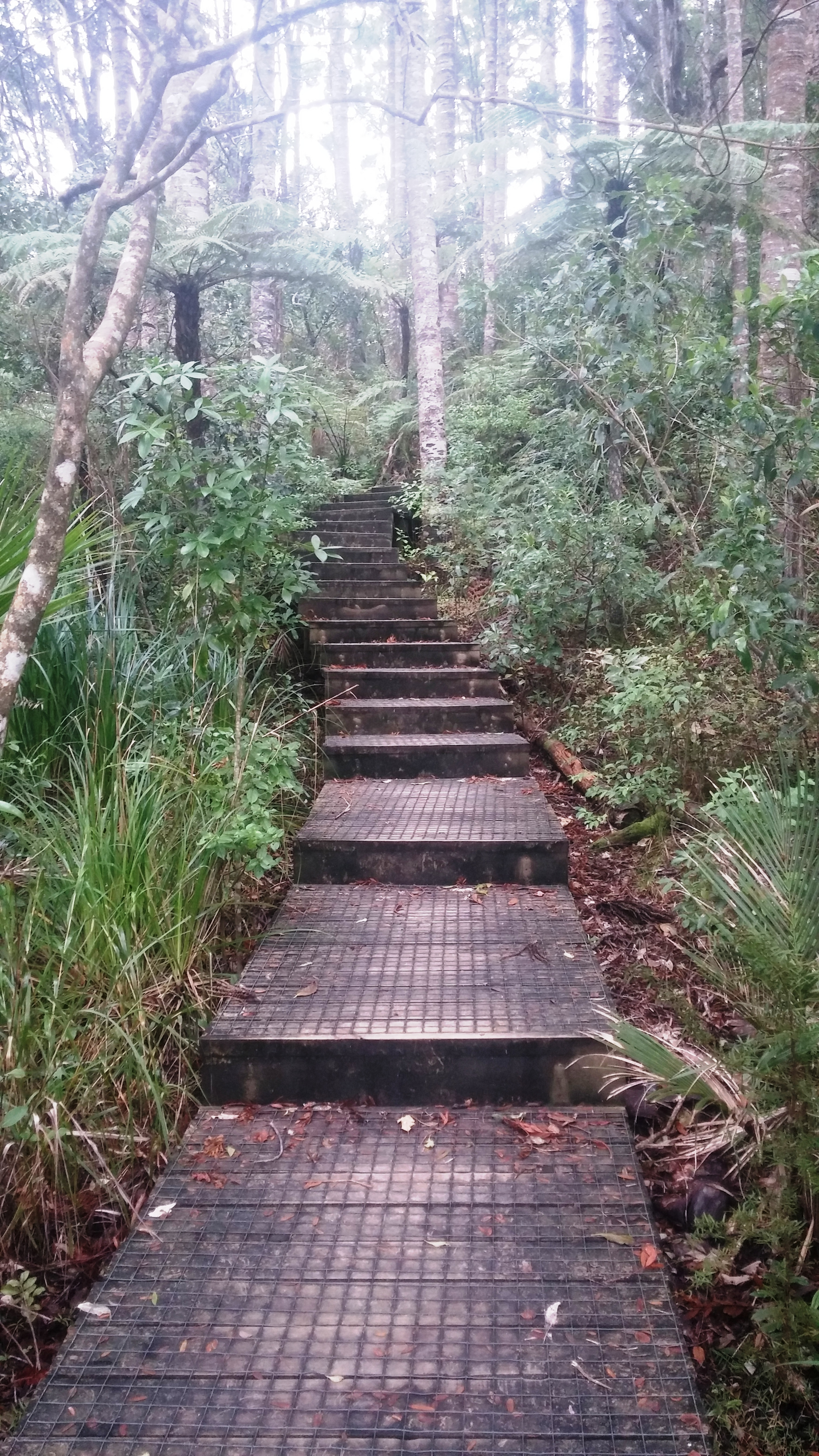
Path

Alice Eaves Scenic Reserve, known colloquially as "Eaves Bush", is a 16ha forest located at the northern end of Orewa, in Auckland, New Zealand. It is named after Alice Caroline Eaves, whose family bequeathed the land to the nation in 1960.

== Historical background ==
The area was previously a defensive pā, built by Te Kawerau sub-tribes, occupied until as recently as 1827. Ngāti Pāoa ceded the land to the Crown on 5 January 1854, which was subsequently granted to an Austrian, Captain Martin Krippner, in 1860.

In the 1870s, Major de Grut took over the land until it was sold to the Eaves family in 1919. In 1940, the Eaves family made the decision that the land should "never fall into private hands again" and after the death of Mrs Eaves in 1955, the native bush on the property was "designated as reserve and gifted to the community."

The local Lions began making tracks, building bridges and removing invasive weeds, and the Reserve was formally opened by the Lions Club Chairman, Don Woods on 10 December 1960. The daughters of Alice and Edward Eaves were present.

== Features ==
A series of pedestrian walkways have been constructed through the reserve, as well as a wooden look out point over Orewa Beach that was built in 1997.

The reserve includes kauri trees as old as 300 years. In addition, the bush contains native trees such as tōtara, mataī, kahikatea, pūriri, rata, karaka, rimu, rewarewa, nīkau and taraire. A number of these trees can be identified by labels along the walkway.

Several small streams feed the Nukumea Stream, which marks the reserve's southern boundary.

== Local Board and Council governance ==
The status of the land is Scenic Reserve 19(1)(a) and under the Reserves Act, the management is the responsibility of the Hibiscus and Bays Local Board, elected representatives under the Governing Body, Auckland Council. The role of the Board is to make decisions on local matters such as the maintenance and upgrading of facilities, caring for the environment, preservation of heritage and supporting activities in the area. Taking into account issues that could impact the significant natural and heritage values of the Reserve, the Board's draft Plan for 2020 proposed intentions aimed at preserving and enhancing ecosystems, improving or realigning paths to protect against pathogen incursion, retaining "cultural heritage including the remnant ring ditch Pā site particularly when considering any future development or park enhancement and [consideration of] opportunities to improve connections through the park and deliver on the Hibiscus and Bays Greenways / Local Paths Plan 2016." Following community consultation the Final Hibiscus and Bays Local Board Plan adopted on 5 November 2020, listed "aspirational outcomes" and key initiatives to achieve objectives. Under Outcome 3, one objective was to "support the development and implementation of ecological and environmental restoration plans", with one key initiative to "support the remediation of tracks to help stop the spread of kauri dieback and enable public access." Another outcome in the Plan that related to the Reserve, to 'Protect, maintain and improve access and amenities for activities on our coastlines, parks and reserves' stated a key initiative to "implement the Hisbiscus and Bays Greenways Local Paths Plan for walkways and cycleways." The 2020/2021 Annual Report of the Local Board noted that the pedestrian bridge over the Nukumea Stream near Reserve had been renewed, and acknowledged the contribution of the Eaves Bush Appreciation Group in maintaining the Reserve over many years.

=== Threat to kauri trees ===
In June 2019, the Reserve was required by the Auckland Council to close to the public due to the danger of kauri dieback caused by the spread of a pathogen in contaminated soil possibly being carried on the soles of shoes. Lauri Rands from the Eaves Bush Appreciation Society expressed sadness but noted that protection of the 800-year-old kauri in the Reserve was a good example of the importance of taking this action.

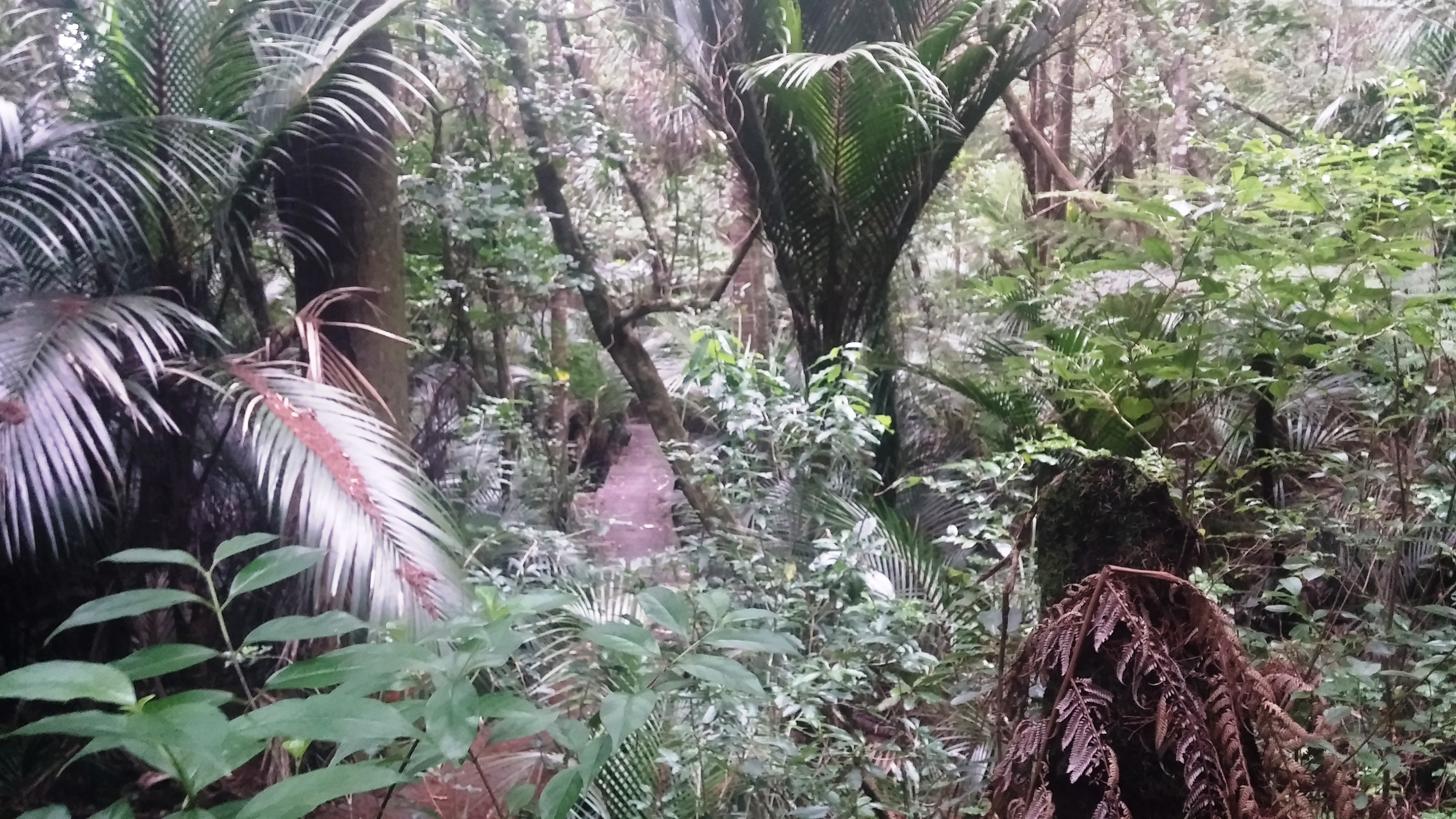
Eaves Bush path

The lower track on the Reserve was re-opened on 30 August 2020 with a hygiene station at the entrance and exit to allow shoes to be cleaned. It was noted at the time, that the upper tracks were scheduled for re-opening late in 2021. Hibiscus and Bays Local Board Chair Gary Brown expressed delight at the reopening and appreciation to the Council for the work they had done to bring this about. He also acknowledged the voluntary contribution of the Eaves Bush Appreciation Group who had worked for years to weed, plant and trap pests. Members of this group were the first to walk the re-opened section.

=== Greenways projects ===
The Greenways project proposed by the Auckland Council in 2016 had been prioritised by the Hisbiscus and Bays Local Board in 2017 and a feasibility report for implementing walking and cycling connections between the Reserve and Hatfields Beach was completed in 2018. In its Objectives, the Report noted: "The proposed Alice Eaves Walkway and Cycleway development has potential benefits to a wide range of the community and visitors; from local residents who wish to venture along a safe walkway, commuters using the walkway as an alternative to using the road and visitors looking to explore the area."
