= Auckland Surf Park =

Surf park in Dairy Flat, Auckland, New Zealand

- Location: Auckland, New Zealand
- Coordinates: 36.65643°S 174.64177°E
- Status: Under construction
- Opens: 2027
- Owner: Aventuur
- Area: 43 hectares (110 acres)

Auckland Surf Park is a heated artificial surfing lagoon currently under construction. In 2023, it was decided that the park would be located in Dairy Flat, several kilometres west of the Hibiscus Coast in north Auckland. Once completed, it will be the world's first heated artificial surfing lagoon.

The park is reportedly expected to cost NZ$100 million to construct, and will employ in excess of 400 people during its construction. Once operational, the park is expected to employ more than 120 employees.

== History ==
In late 2020, the surf park was first announced following the announcement of Swell Planet, another surf park also set to be located in north Auckland.

In May 2023, it was the intention for Auckland Surf Park to become the world's first heated surfing wave pool was announced, along with the park's location. Later in the year, it was revealed that the park had entered into final resource consenting with the Environmental Protection Authority.

The park received its resource consent in June 2024 with construction then expected to start in late 2024. On 10 February 2025 Aventuur broke ground on the project. The park is now expected to open sometime in 2027, with between 12 and 18 months required to construct.

== Lagoon ==
At the centre of the surf park is a 2.2 hectares (5.4 acres) Wavegarden Cove artificial surfing lagoon. The lagoon is set to be heated to allow for year-round operation.

== Amenities ==
The development is set to include accommodation of approximately 90 individual cabins, and a 50-room lodge. Additionally, it is set to include a cafe, kiosk, farm-to-table restaurant, surf club, hiring and coaching facilities.

== Environmental Conservation ==
The development will also include a data centre, and a 5-8 MW solar farm covering 8 hectares (20 acres) to help power the development and data centre. With the target of achieving a Green Star rating from the NZGBC, excess heat is set to be captured from the data centre and used to warm the surfing lagoon.
