= Fairview Heights, Virginia =

Unincorporated community in Virginia, United States

Coordinates: 37.816813°N 79.812562°W

Fairview Heights is an unincorporated community in Alleghany County, Virginia, United States.
