= Ōkura, New Zealand =

Ōkura
- Suburb
- Interactive map of Ōkura
- Coordinates: 36.67476506°S 174.72031740°E
- Country: New Zealand
- City: Auckland
- Local authority: Auckland Council
- Electoral ward: Albany ward
- Local board: Hibiscus and Bays

Area
  - Land: 36 ha (89 acres)

Population (June 2025)
  - Total: 380
  - Density: 1,100/km^{2} (2,700/sq mi)
- Postcode: 0792

Redvale	Weiti Village	(Karepiro Bay)
Redvale	Ōkura	Long Bay
Fairview Heights	Northcross	Torbay

Ōkura is a rural settlement to the north of Auckland, New Zealand. It is under the local governance of the Auckland Council. The official name is spelled with a macron.

Ōkura is a small village on the south shore of the Okura River, on the opposite shore to the Okura Bush Scenic Reserve. It is the only location that provides access to the Okura River in the form of basic launching facilities for small craft.

The New Zealand Ministry for Culture and Heritage gives a translation of "place of red (clay)" for Ōkura.

== History ==
The area was traditionally referred to by the name Karepiro, and was in rohe of the Ngāti Manuhiri iwi (tribe). The north shore of the Okura River was the location of Otaimaro, an extensive settlement. In 1848, Henry Dacre and his father Captain Ranulph Dacre purchased the land surrounding the river, creating the Weiti Station. Their house, the Dacre Cottage, was built circa 1855 on the north shore of the river from locally made bricks.

== Demographics ==
Statistics New Zealand describes Ōkura as a rural settlement, which covers 0.36 km^{2} (0.14 sq mi) and had an estimated population of 380 as of June 2025, with a population density of 1,056 people per km^{2}. The settlement is part of the larger Ōkura Bush statistical area.

Historical population for Ōkura settlement
Year	Pop.	±% p.a.
2006	324	—
2013	357	+1.40%
2018	372	+0.83%
2023	381	+0.48%

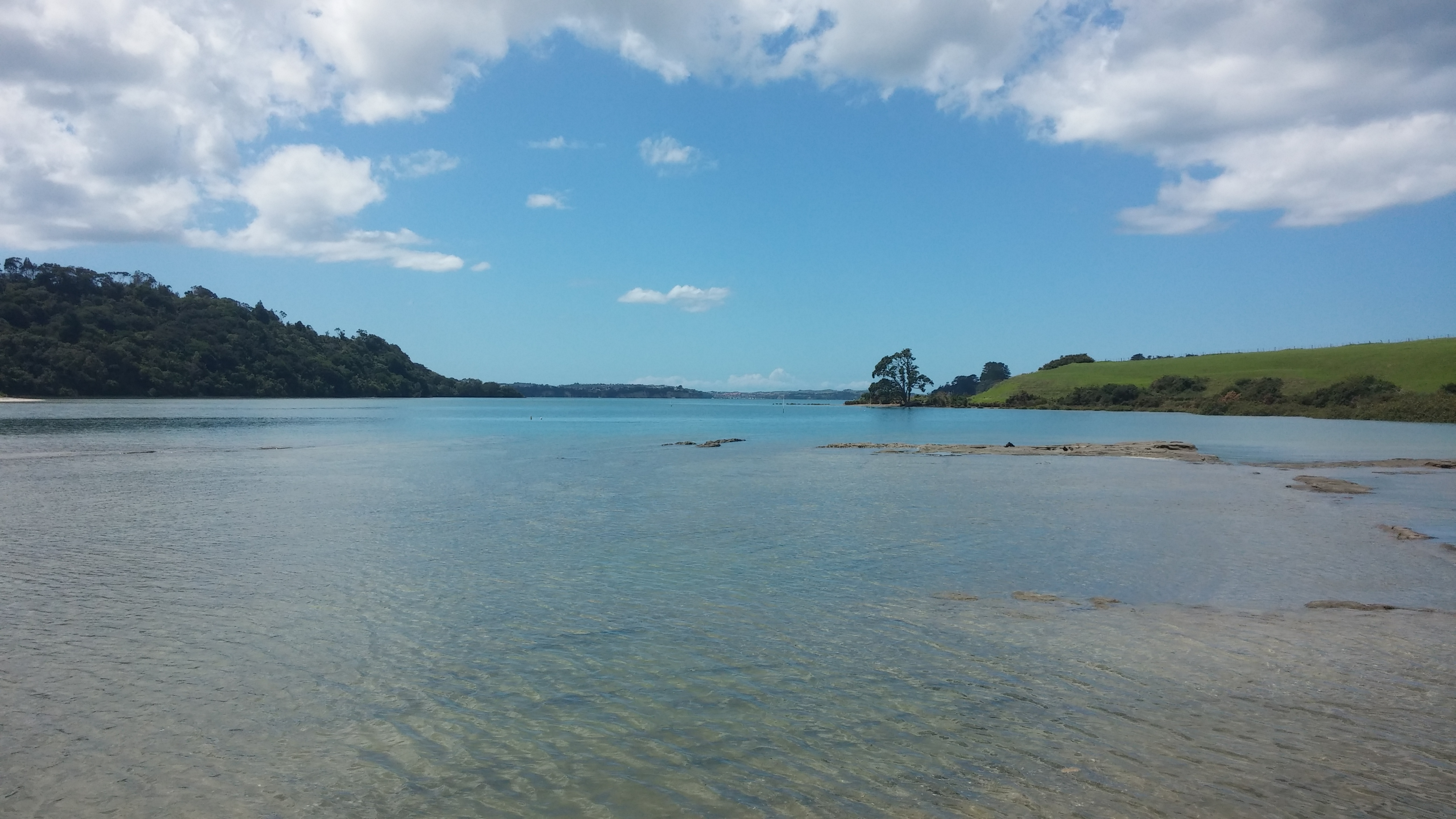
Okura River from the end of Okura River Road

Ōkura settlement had a population of 381 in the 2023 New Zealand census, an increase of 9 people (2.4%) since the 2018 census, and an increase of 24 people (6.7%) since the 2013 census. There were 189 males and 195 females in 132 dwellings. 2.4% of people identified as LGBTIQ+. The median age was 42.1 years (compared with 38.1 years nationally). There were 66 people (17.3%) aged under 15 years, 72 (18.9%) aged 15 to 29, 183 (48.0%) aged 30 to 64, and 60 (15.7%) aged 65 or older.

People could identify as more than one ethnicity. The results were 92.9% European (Pākehā), 8.7% Māori, 2.4% Pasifika, 3.9% Asian, and 1.6% other, which includes people giving their ethnicity as "New Zealander". English was spoken by 96.9%, Māori language by 0.8%, and other languages by 12.6%. No language could be spoken by 3.1% (e.g. too young to talk). The percentage of people born overseas was 33.9, compared with 28.8% nationally.

Religious affiliations were 26.0% Christian, 2.4% Hindu, 0.8% Islam, 0.8% Buddhist, 0.8% New Age, and 1.6% other religions. People who answered that they had no religion were 64.6%, and 6.3% of people did not answer the census question.

Of those at least 15 years old, 72 (22.9%) people had a bachelor's or higher degree, 159 (50.5%) had a post-high school certificate or diploma, and 60 (19.0%) people exclusively held high school qualifications. The median income was $53,700, compared with $41,500 nationally. 66 people (21.0%) earned over $100,000 compared to 12.1% nationally. The employment status of those at least 15 was that 171 (54.3%) people were employed full-time, 54 (17.1%) were part-time, and 6 (1.9%) were unemployed.

=== Ōkura Bush statistical area ===
Ōkura Bush statistical area, which includes Weiti Village, covers 28.27 km^{2} (10.92 sq mi) and had an estimated population of 1,480 as of June 2025, with a population density of 52 people per km^{2}.

Historical population for Okura Bush
Year	Pop.	±% p.a.
2006	1,125	—
2013	1,227	+1.25%
2018	1,272	+0.72%
2023	1,395	+1.86%
The 2006 population is for a larger area of 28.99 km^{2}. Source:

Ōkura Bush had a population of 1,395 in the 2023 New Zealand census, an increase of 123 people (9.7%) since the 2018 census, and an increase of 168 people (13.7%) since the 2013 census. There were 735 males, 657 females and 3 people of other genders in 450 dwellings. 2.8% of people identified as LGBTIQ+. The median age was 41.6 years (compared with 38.1 years nationally). There were 252 people (18.1%) aged under 15 years, 237 (17.0%) aged 15 to 29, 696 (49.9%) aged 30 to 64, and 210 (15.1%) aged 65 or older.

People could identify as more than one ethnicity. The results were 77.4% European (Pākehā); 7.1% Māori; 3.0% Pasifika; 18.7% Asian; 2.4% Middle Eastern, Latin American and African New Zealanders (MELAA); and 2.2% other, which includes people giving their ethnicity as "New Zealander". English was spoken by 94.2%, Māori language by 0.9%, and other languages by 24.9%. No language could be spoken by 1.7% (e.g. too young to talk). New Zealand Sign Language was known by 0.4%. The percentage of people born overseas was 38.5, compared with 28.8% nationally.

Religious affiliations were 29.0% Christian, 0.6% Hindu, 0.4% Islam, 1.1% Buddhist, 0.2% New Age, 0.2% Jewish, and 1.1% other religions. People who answered that they had no religion were 61.7%, and 6.2% of people did not answer the census question.

Of those at least 15 years old, 264 (23.1%) people had a bachelor's or higher degree, 543 (47.5%) had a post-high school certificate or diploma, and 243 (21.3%) people exclusively held high school qualifications. The median income was $50,900, compared with $41,500 nationally. 237 people (20.7%) earned over $100,000 compared to 12.1% nationally. The employment status of those at least 15 was that 609 (53.3%) people were employed full-time, 168 (14.7%) were part-time, and 15 (1.3%) were unemployed. Before the 2023 census, Okura Bush had a larger boundary, covering 28.99 km^{2} (11.19 sq mi). Using that boundary, Okura Bush had a population of 1,332 at the 2018 New Zealand census, an increase of 48 people (3.7%) since the 2013 census, and an increase of 207 people (18.4%) since the 2006 census. There were 432 households, comprising 681 males and 651 females, giving a sex ratio of 1.05 males per female. The median age was 39.7 years (compared with 37.4 years nationally), with 237 people (17.8%) aged under 15 years, 285 (21.4%) aged 15 to 29, 633 (47.5%) aged 30 to 64, and 174 (13.1%) aged 65 or older.

Ethnicities were 83.8% European/Pākehā, 5.9% Māori, 1.8% Pacific peoples, 14.0% Asian, and 1.8% other ethnicities. People may identify with more than one ethnicity.

The percentage of people born overseas was 37.8, compared with 27.1% nationally.

Although some people chose not to answer the census's question about religious affiliation, 58.8% had no religion, 32.2% were Christian, 0.5% had Māori religious beliefs, 0.2% were Hindu, 0.5% were Muslim, 1.1% were Buddhist and 1.8% had other religions.

Of those at least 15 years old, 309 (28.2%) people had a bachelor's or higher degree, and 99 (9.0%) people had no formal qualifications. The median income was $40,200, compared with $31,800 nationally. 276 people (25.2%) earned over $70,000 compared to 17.2% nationally. The employment status of those at least 15 was that 579 (52.9%) people were employed full-time, 183 (16.7%) were part-time, and 27 (2.5%) were unemployed.
