= Stillwater, Auckland =

Stillwater
- Suburb
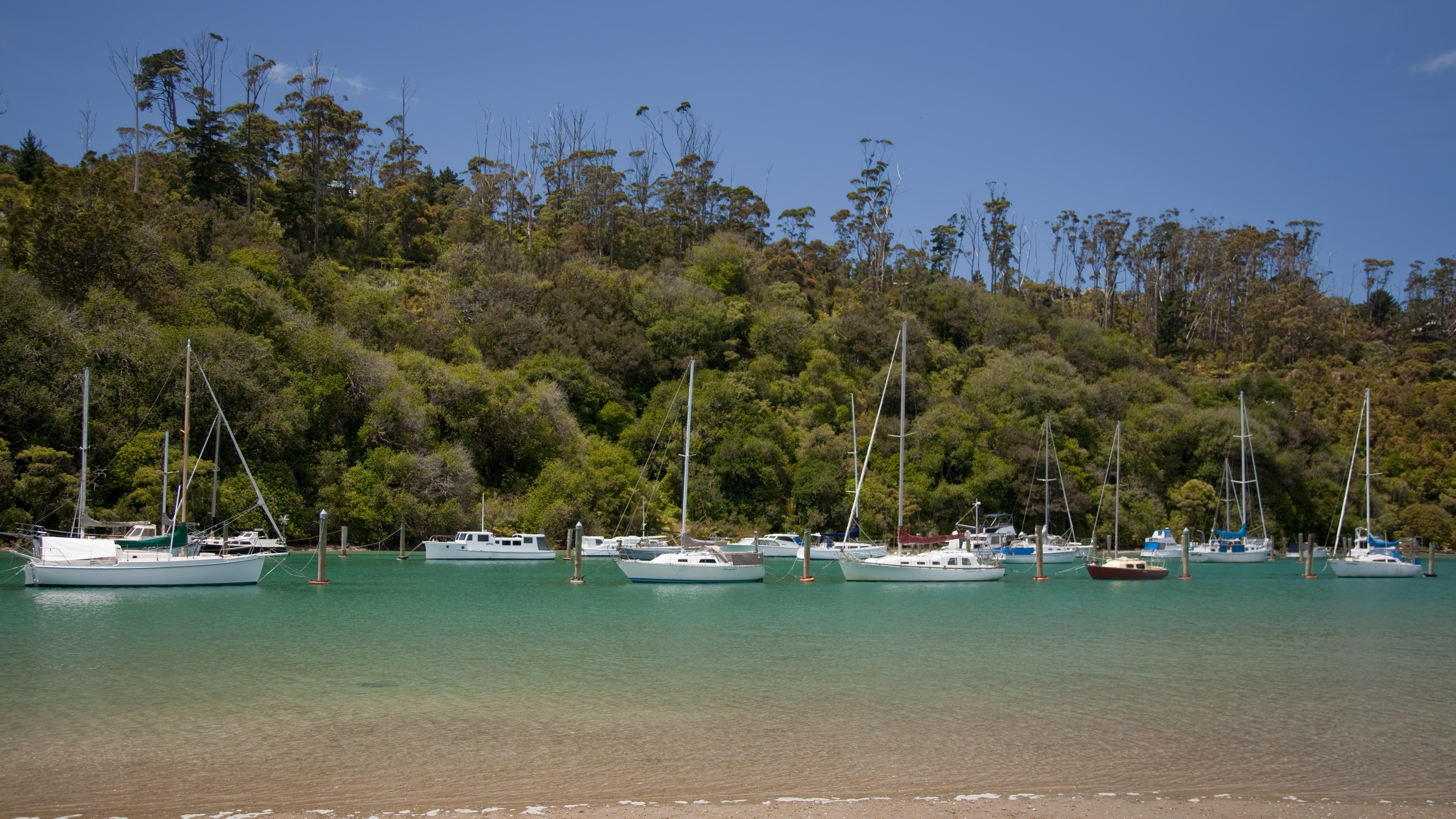
- Yachts moored at Stillwater
- Interactive map of Stillwater
- Coordinates: 36.639°S 174.715°E
- Country: New Zealand
- City: Auckland
- Local authority: Auckland Council
- Electoral ward: Albany ward
- Local board: Hibiscus and Bays

Area
  - Land: 44 ha (110 acres)

Population (June 2025)
  - Total: 940
  - Density: 2,100/km^{2} (5,500/sq mi)
- Postcode(s): 0794, 0932, 0992

Wainui	Silverdale	Red Beach
Dairy Flat	Stillwater	Stanmore Bay
Dairy Flat	Weiti Village	Hauraki Gulf

Stillwater is a village in the northern end of Auckland in the North Island of New Zealand. Situated on the Weiti River immediately south of the Whangaparāoa Peninsula in the Rodney District, it is part of the area known as the Hibiscus Coast.

== History ==
In the 1850s, century Silverdale (then known as The Wade) was established as a port for transporting kauri logs to Auckland. Stillwater was also used as a secondary landing to transport logs, kauri gum and later fruit produce from orchards established on cleared land at Stillwater, Silverdale and Dairy Flat. As there was no roading sea was the only form of transport available. The last shipment of kauri gum to leave Stillwater was in 1890. The pack horse tracks from Dairy Flat are still clearly visible on the Weiti Station property. The earliest European name for the area was Five Fingers, in reference to the many sandspits found along the Weiti River.

The earliest settler in the Stillwater area was Ranulph Dacre, who began timber felling in 1848. Dacre was followed by Andrew Weatherspoon Thorburn and his family in 1852. Part of his original holding is now a reserve and memorial park bequeathed on their farm. Several houses were built on the river's edge in the early days as more land was cleared and made available for farming. Some live stock was introduced, but fruit from orchards seemed to be the major produce transported to Auckland from Stillwater.

Other early settlers included the Percy, Blackshaw and McPike brothers families. In 1950 the McPike brothers subdivided their farm to form what has become the Stillwater settlement known today. After the Second World War the motor camp was developed and a road from East Coast Road constructed. Prior to this there existed only a farm track to Stillwater with a ford crossing at Doctor's Creek. The original bridge built was gradually improved over the years to the two lane concrete bridge today.

In 1958, a residential subdivision was constructed in the area, bringing more residents. This is the point when Stillwater was adopted as the name of the settlement. In 1980 the Council began tar-sealing the road. In 1985 Stillwater was connected to the Whangaparaoa sewerage system and more substantial houses were built in the area. By the year 2000, most of the power and telephone cables were put underground and footpaths formed the length of Stillwater Crescent. Houses were built on almost all the original sections developed and Stillwater could no longer be called a holiday resort; it had become a well established marine suburb.

In time Coastal Heights was developed followed by the adjoining Inlet Views property and new coastal development is taking place over the river opposite the Stillwater Boat Club. Buildings continue to appear as land is cleared.

In late 2022, construction began on a new motorway between the Auckland Northern Motorway and the Whangaparāoa Peninsula, crossing the Weiti River at Stillwater and connecting the township to the Auckland motorways network. The road is projected to open in 2026.

== Demographics ==
Statistics New Zealand describes Stillwater as a rural settlement, which covers 0.44 km^{2} (0.17 sq mi) and had an estimated population of 940 as of June 2025, with a population density of 2,136 people per km^{2}. The settlement was part of the larger Silverdale South statistical area before the 2023 census.

Historical population
Year	Pop.	±% p.a.
2006	816	—
2013	870	+0.92%
2018	978	+2.37%
2023	939	−0.81%

Stillwater had a population of 939 in the 2023 New Zealand census, a decrease of 39 people (−4.0%) since the 2018 census, and an increase of 69 people (7.9%) since the 2013 census. There were 471 males, 462 females and 3 people of other genders in 324 dwellings. 2.2% of people identified as LGBTIQ+. The median age was 40.5 years (compared with 38.1 years nationally). There were 195 people (20.8%) aged under 15 years, 132 (14.1%) aged 15 to 29, 504 (53.7%) aged 30 to 64, and 105 (11.2%) aged 65 or older.

People could identify as more than one ethnicity. The results were 93.3% European (Pākehā); 8.9% Māori; 1.6% Pasifika; 4.5% Asian; 0.6% Middle Eastern, Latin American and African New Zealanders (MELAA); and 2.6% other, which includes people giving their ethnicity as "New Zealander". English was spoken by 97.1%, Māori language by 1.0%, Samoan by 0.3%, and other languages by 12.1%. No language could be spoken by 1.9% (e.g. too young to talk). The percentage of people born overseas was 31.0, compared with 28.8% nationally.

Religious affiliations were 24.6% Christian, 0.3% Māori religious beliefs, 0.3% Buddhist, 0.3% New Age, and 1.0% other religions. People who answered that they had no religion were 67.7%, and 5.4% of people did not answer the census question.

Of those at least 15 years old, 129 (17.3%) people had a bachelor's or higher degree, 429 (57.7%) had a post-high school certificate or diploma, and 132 (17.7%) people exclusively held high school qualifications. The median income was $59,200, compared with $41,500 nationally. 144 people (19.4%) earned over $100,000 compared to 12.1% nationally. The employment status of those at least 15 was that 486 (65.3%) people were employed full-time, 87 (11.7%) were part-time, and 15 (2.0%) were unemployed.

== Bibliography ==
- Grover, Robin (2008). Why the Hibiscus? Place Names of the Hibiscus Coast. Silverdale Printing. p. 56. ISBN 978-0-473-13484-6.
