= Weiti River =

River in the Auckland Region, New Zealand

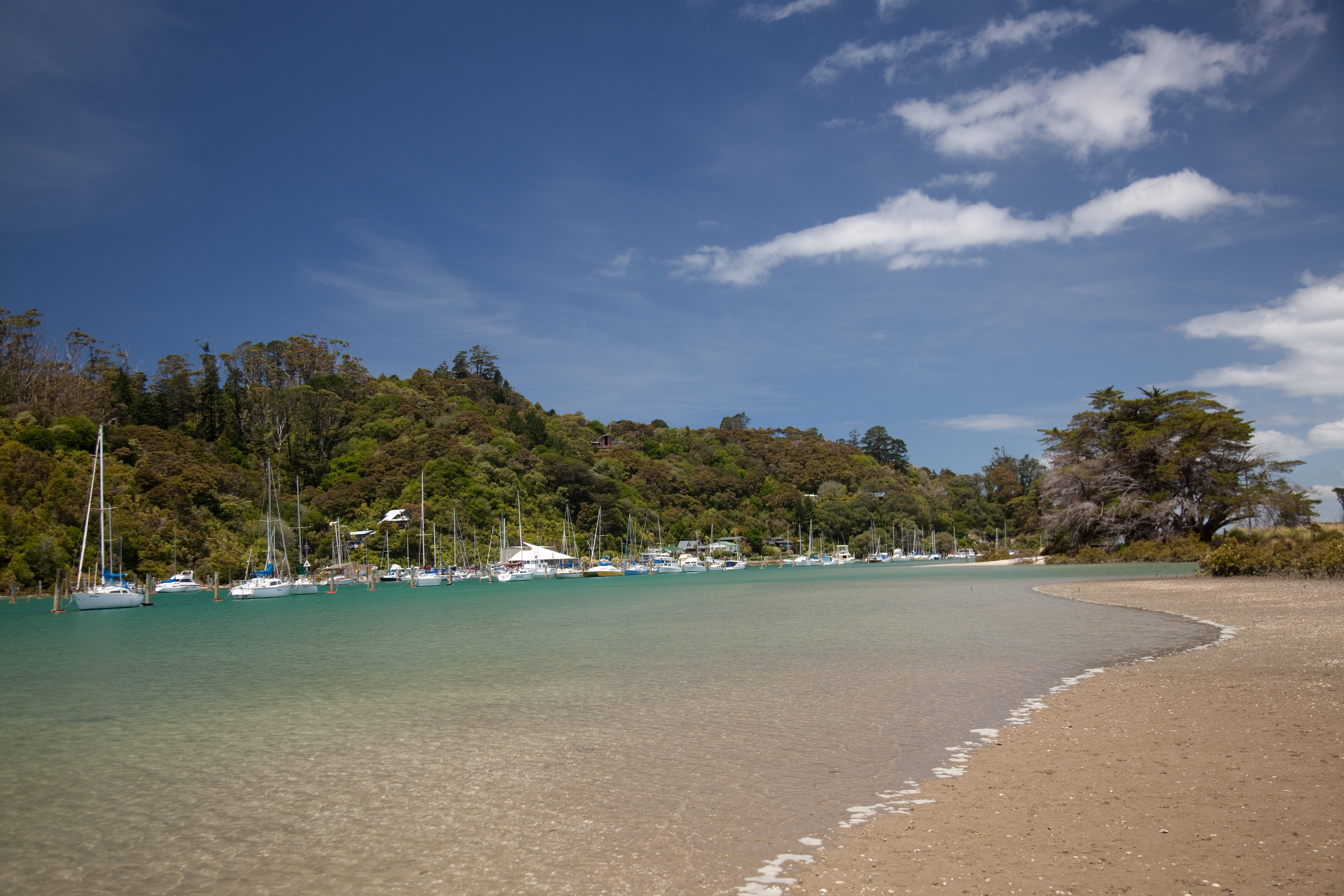
- The Weiti River near Stillwater, Auckland

- Mouth of the Weiti River Weiti River (New Zealand)
- Route of the Weiti River

Location
- Country: New Zealand
- Region: Auckland Region

Physical characteristics
- Source
  - location: Confluence of the Weiti Stream and John Creek
  - coordinates: 36.61964°S 174.66738°E
- Mouth: Karepiro Bay
  - coordinates: 36.6474°S 174.7337°E

Basin features
- Progression: Weiti River → Karepiro Bay → Hauraki Gulf → Pacific Ocean
- Landmarks: Silverdale, Stillwater, Wade Heads, Whangaparaoa Peninsula
- Tributaries
  - right: Duck Creek, Doctors Creek
- Bridges: Penlink Bridge

The Weiti River is an estuarine river to the north of Auckland in the North Island of New Zealand. It rises as the Weiti Stream in the low hills approximately 7 kilometres (4 mi) west of Silverdale and emerges into the Hauraki Gulf immediately south of the Whangaparāoa Peninsula. The upper stretches of the river are heavily grown with mangroves but with care, small craft can navigate it as far as Silverdale at high tide. Stillwater is the only other settlement along the river's banks. Wentworth College, based in nearby Gulf Harbour, uses the Weiti River for its rowing training.

Up until the 1950s this river and estuary was known by locals as the Wade river.
