= Dairy Flat =

- Interactive map of Dairy Flat
- Coordinates: 36.663°S 174.6393°E
- Country: New Zealand
- Region: Auckland
- Ward: Rodney
- Community board: Rodney Local Board
- Subdivision: Dairy Flat subdivision
- Electorates: Whangaparāoa; Te Tai Tokerau

Government
  - Territorial authority: Auckland Council
  - Mayor of Auckland: Wayne Brown
  - Whangaparāoa MP: Mark Mitchell
  - Te Tai Tokerau MP: Mariameno Kapa-Kingi

Area
  - Total: 64.15 km^{2} (24.77 sq mi)

Population (June 2025)
  - Total: 5,310
  - Density: 82.8/km^{2} (214/sq mi)

Dairy Flat is a rural district 8 km south of Orewa and 28 km north of central Auckland in the North Island of New Zealand. Until the early 1990s most of the district was in dairy farms of 40 to 60 hectares (100 to 150 acres). With the growth of Auckland and the extension of the Northern Motorway into the area, these are being gradually subdivided into lifestyle blocks of around 2 to 5 hectares (5 to 12 acres), many of which are grazing sheep, horses, beef cattle or deer. Although it still retains a rural character, it is counted as part of the Auckland urban area in official statistics.

== Geography ==
Dairy Flat has a small village shopping centre and the Dairy Flat Primary School. A major facility is the North Shore Aerodrome owned and operated by the North Shore Aero Club. In addition to aero club and private aircraft, the field is used by Barrier Air to run a scheduled air service in passenger aircraft to Great Barrier Island, some 40 nautical miles (75 km) offshore of the coast. The major road is the Northern Motorway, and secondarily Urban Route 31, which was formerly State Highway 17 and, before the extension of the motorway, State Highway 1.

== History ==
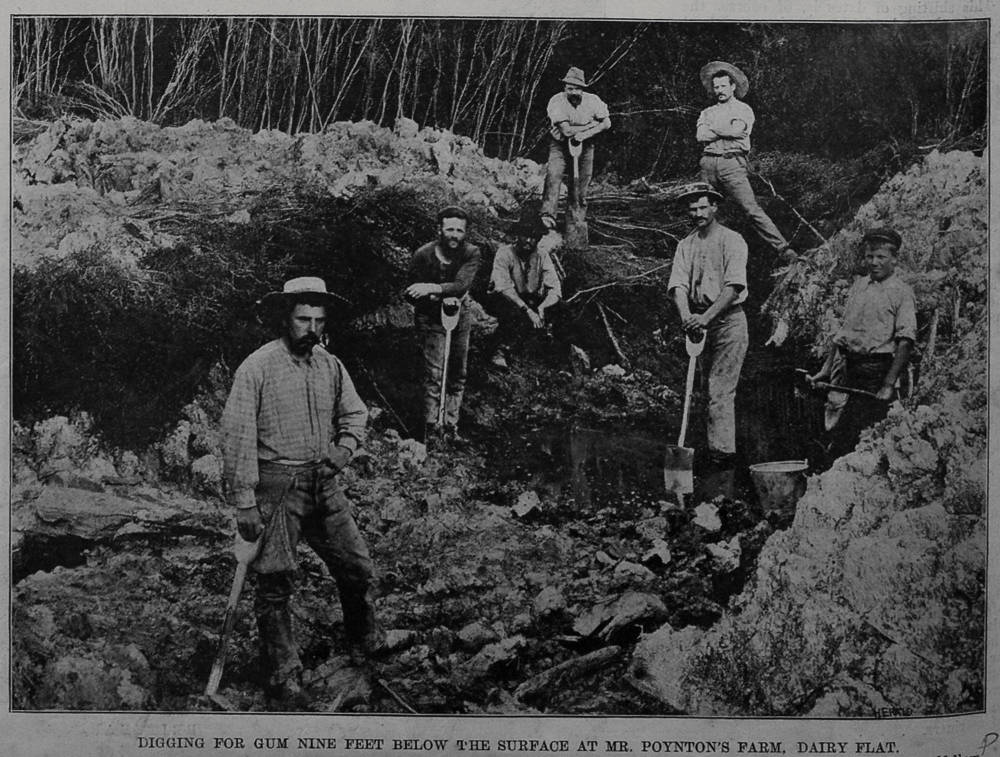
Digging for gum nine feet below the surface at Mr Poynton's farm, Dairy Flat

In the 1850s, Maurice and Mary Kelly established a dairy farm in the area, likely at the location of the North Shore Aerodrome. They named the adjacent stream Dairy Stream, and Dairy Flat was in turn named after the stream. The first known references to the name Dairy Flat come from 1865. The area was a plentiful source of kauri gum, which was sold at the local kauri gum camps: Bull Town on Poyntons Farm, Tiger Camp, and Horse Shoe Bush/Nanahu. Maurice Kelly took over the family timber felling business in the 1860s and 1870s. In 1878, Dairy Flat School was established.

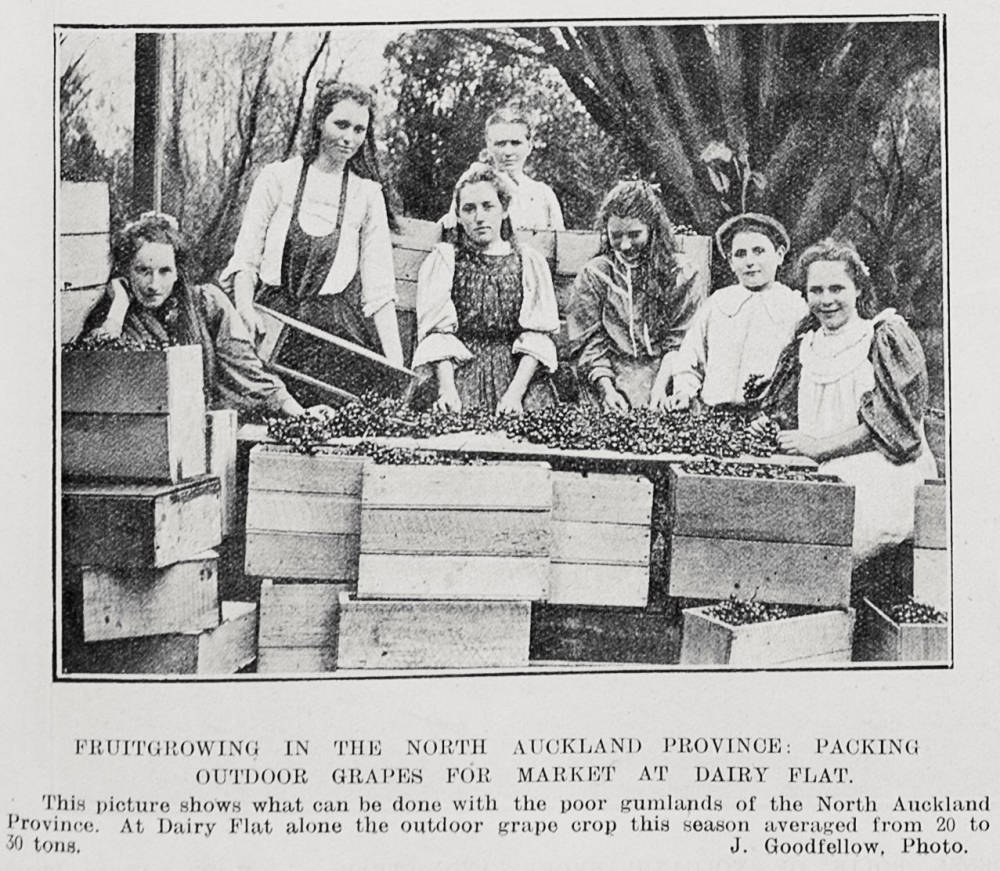
Fruit growing In The North Auckland Province

Lime quarrying began in the early 1920s. Local residents lobbied for the area's name to be changed from Dairy Flat to Pine Valley in 1931, but were unsuccessful. The area started to be used for flights in the early 1960s, and in 1963 the North Shore Aero Club was established, operating from North Shore Aerodrome.

The Redvale lime quarry started operating in the 1960s. Waste Management Incorporated bought the quarry site in 1988 and began operating it as Redvale Landfill in 1993. As of 2025 it was taking more than half of Auckland's rubbish. Methane created by the decomposing waste at the landfill is used to generate electricity. Redvale Landfill and Energy, managed by Waste Management NZ, is consented until 2028.

The area was administered by Rodney County Council until 1989, then by Rodney District Council from 1989 to 2010. It has been administered by Auckland Council since 2010 and is in its Rodney ward.

The Auckland Surf Park is a heated artificial surfing lagoon being built in Dairy Flat and expected to open in 2027.

A proposal to build up to 1,100 residences and a village centre between Horseshoe Bush Road and Kahikatia Flat Road failed to get a fast-track approval in October 2026.

== Demographics ==
Dairy Flat covers 64.15 km^{2} (24.77 sq mi) and had an estimated population of 5,310 as of June 2025, with a population density of 83 people per km^{2}.

Historical population
Year	Pop.	±% p.a.
2006	3,756	—
2013	4,203	+1.62%
2018	4,614	+1.88%
2023	4,977	+1.53%
The 2006 population is for a larger area of 69.17 km^{2}. Source:

Dairy Flat had a population of 4,977 in the 2023 New Zealand census, an increase of 363 people (7.9%) since the 2018 census, and an increase of 774 people (18.4%) since the 2013 census. There were 2,553 males, 2,409 females and 18 people of other genders in 1,542 dwellings. 2.7% of people identified as LGBTIQ+. The median age was 40.5 years (compared with 38.1 years nationally). There were 840 people (16.9%) aged under 15 years, 1,020 (20.5%) aged 15 to 29, 2,403 (48.3%) aged 30 to 64, and 714 (14.3%) aged 65 or older.

People could identify as more than one ethnicity. The results were 76.9% European (Pākehā); 8.9% Māori; 2.3% Pasifika; 19.0% Asian; 1.2% Middle Eastern, Latin American and African New Zealanders (MELAA); and 2.5% other, which includes people giving their ethnicity as "New Zealander". English was spoken by 94.1%, Māori language by 1.9%, Samoan by 0.2%, and other languages by 22.3%. No language could be spoken by 1.4% (e.g. too young to talk). New Zealand Sign Language was known by 0.3%. The percentage of people born overseas was 35.0, compared with 28.8% nationally.

Religious affiliations were 28.0% Christian, 0.5% Hindu, 0.8% Islam, 0.2% Māori religious beliefs, 0.7% Buddhist, 0.5% New Age, 0.2% Jewish, and 1.3% other religions. People who answered that they had no religion were 61.6%, and 6.4% of people did not answer the census question.

Of those at least 15 years old, 897 (21.7%) people had a bachelor's or higher degree, 2,085 (50.4%) had a post-high school certificate or diploma, and 909 (22.0%) people exclusively held high school qualifications. The median income was $47,300, compared with $41,500 nationally. 753 people (18.2%) earned over $100,000 compared to 12.1% nationally. The employment status of those at least 15 was that 2,220 (53.7%) people were employed full-time, 627 (15.2%) were part-time, and 111 (2.7%) were unemployed.

Individual statistical areas
Name	Area (km^{2})	Population	Density (per km^{2})	Dwellings	Median age	Median income
Dairy Flat North	18.76	1,797	96	519	38.5 years	$42,500
Dairy Flat West	30.98	1,524	49	507	40.9 years	$51,500
Dairy Flat South	14.40	1,659	115	519	42.2 years	$49,300
New Zealand					38.1 years	$41,500

== Education ==
Dairy Flat School is a coeducational contributing primary (years 1–6) school with a roll of 271 as of July 2026. The school was established in 1878. It was a full primary (years 1–8) school in 2015 and a contributing primary school by 2018. As of 2008, most students leaving the school went on to attend Orewa College, with some going to Westlake Boys High School, Westlake Girls High School, Long Bay College or Rangitoto College.
