= Te Muri Regional Park =

Regional park in Auckland, New Zealand

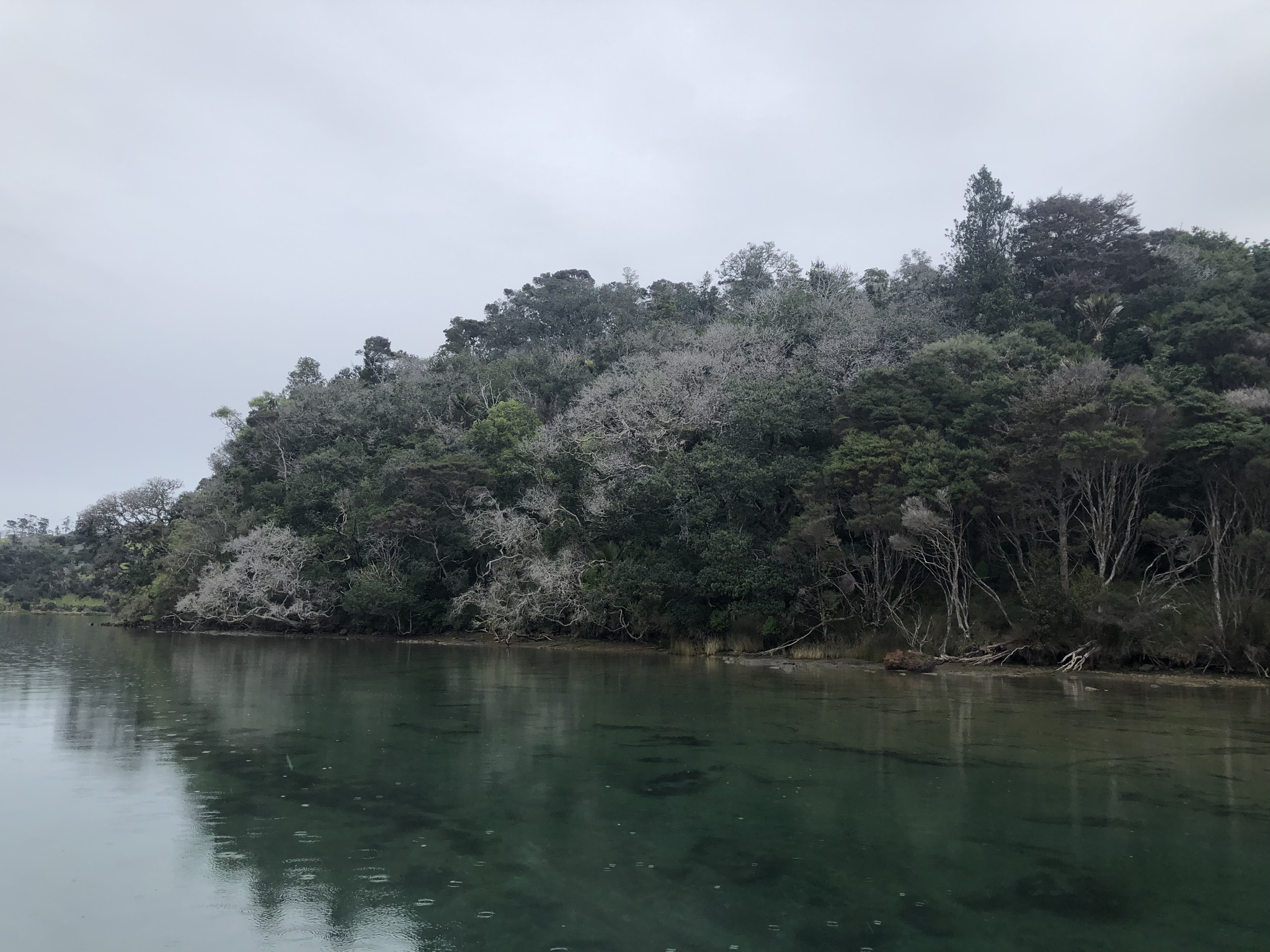
- Beilschmiedia tarairi trees along the Puhoi River, Te Muri Regional Park

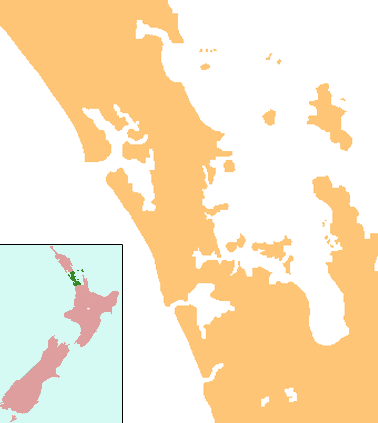
- Location within New Zealand Auckland
- Location: Rodney, Auckland, New Zealand
- Nearest town: Waiwera
- Coordinates: 36.519°S 174.706°E
- Area: 444 hectares (1,100 acres)
- Established: 2010

Te Muri Regional Park is a regional park north of Auckland in New Zealand's North Island. It is situated between the estuaries of the Puhoi River and Te Muri-O-Tarariki Stream, on the east coast of New Zealand's North Island. The park is bordered by two other regional parks: Mahurangi West Regional Park to the north, and Wenderholm Regional Park to the south.

== Geography ==
Te Muri Regional Park is a peninsula formed between the Te Muri-O-Tarariki Stream to the north and the Puhoi River to the south. The eastern coastline of the regional park, Te Muri Beach, is the location of Te Muri urupa / cemetery. The highest point in the regional park is Pūhoi, an 138 metres (453 ft) hill.

== Biodiversity ==
Te Muri Regional Park and Wenderholm Regional Park are a part of the 82 hectares (200 acres) Wenderholm and Te Muri Coastal Forest biodiversity focus area, an area where coastal forest transitions into estuarine and coastal environments. Native bird species found in the park include kererū, kākā, tūī, riroriro and pīwakawaka. Kororā penguins occasionally nest in the area.

== History ==
In 1973, the Auckland Regional Authority purchased 63.8 hectares (158 acres) at Te Muri Beach. During the 1980s, the Authority planned to link the beach to the adjacent parks, Mahurangi West and Wenderholm, by constructing concrete bridges over the two estuaries.

In 2010, the Auckland Regional Council purchased the adjoining 382 hectares (940 acres) Schischka family farm, leading to the creation of Te Muri Regional Park.
