= Mahurangi =

Mahurangi is a region of the North Auckland Peninsula in New Zealand. Mahurangi has been settled since c.1400 AD. Conflicts in the 18th and 19th century led to the area being depopulated, with Māori returning around the time of European arrival. Mahurangi was purchased by the Crown in 1841 but as this purchase did not involve all relevant Māori groups it was not finalised until 1853.

== Etymology ==
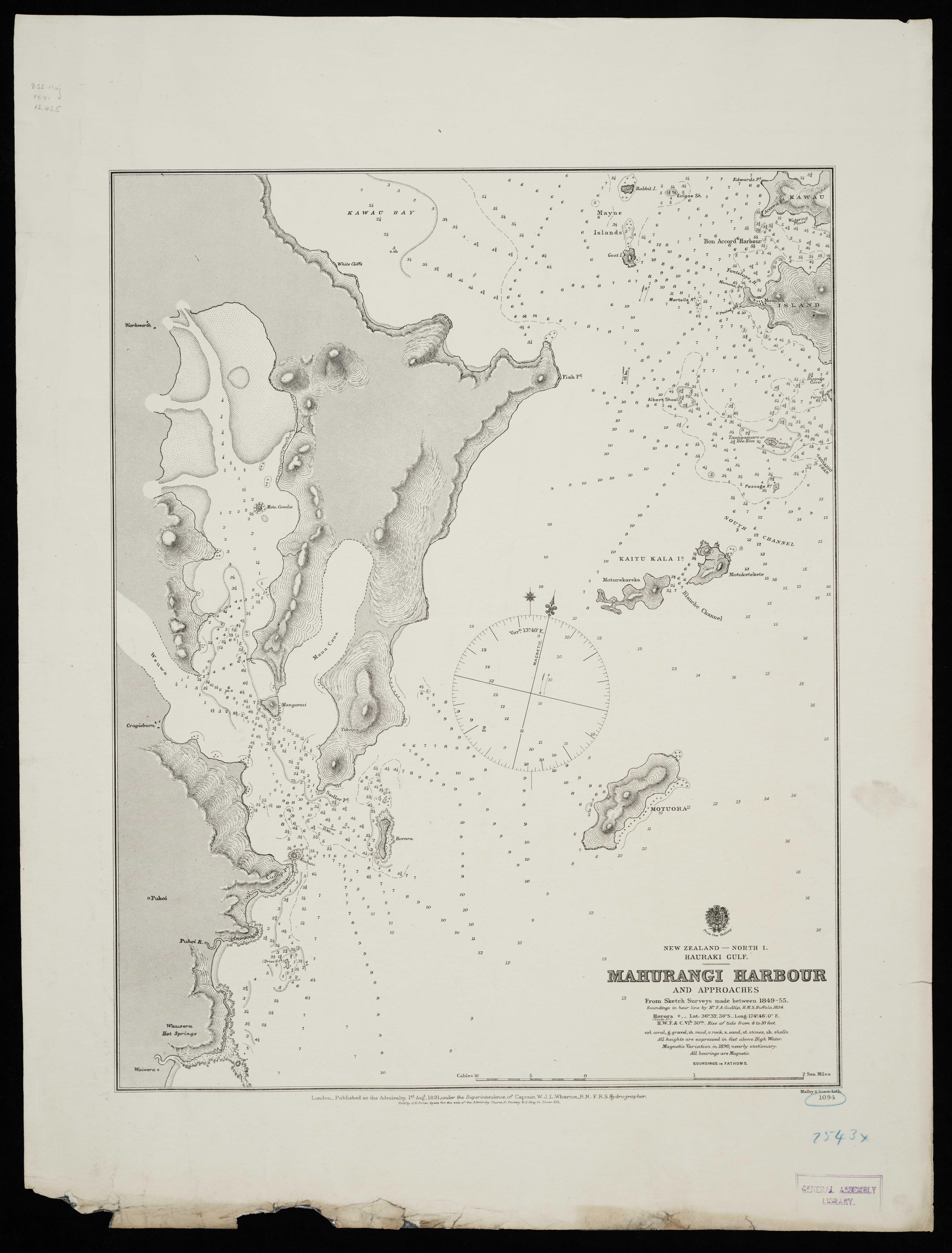
An 1891 map of Mahurangi

The name Mahurangi comes from an island at the mouth of the Waiwera River. The island was named in honour of a legendary ancestor who is said to have to helped construct the Tainui canoe.

== History ==
Around the 14th-century a later wave of Polynesian migration conquered the Mahurangi area from its inhabitants. These peoples became Ngai Tahuhu. In the 16th-century a southern tribe invaded and conquered Ngai Tahuhu. This group would go onto become the sub-tribes that were identified in the Mahurangi by the time of European arrival. In Māori mythology Toi-te-huatahi is the legendary founding ancestor for the Mahurangi tribes. Around the 1720s Ngati Rongo and Ngati Manuhiri would enter into conflict with Ngati Paoa and Ngati Maru over the area with skirmishes occurring throughout the century. During the Musket Wars in the 1820s Ngapuhi attacked the region and the Mahurangi area became uninhabited by 1825. In the late 1830s and 1840s Ngati Rongo and Ngati Raupo returned to the area, with Ngati Rongo occupying Te Muri in 1836.

The Mãori sub-tribes Ngāti Rongo, Ngāti Kā and Ngāti Raupō were the groups that occupied the Mahurangi region by the time of European arrival. Marutūahu would visit the region in the summer. In 1841 the government purchased the Mahurangi region (100,000 acres (40,000 ha)) from Hauraki Maori for £200, although this purchase was disputed by other Mãori and the government ended up having to also buy the land off Ngāti Rongo, with a purchase finalised in 1853. This final purchase allowed the Mahurangi Block to be properly demarcated and land surveying and subdivision followed suit.

Settlement of the Mahurangi region focused on the coastal areas, with Maori moving between different locations as resources depleted and seasons changed. The area had good access to shark fishing grounds and the desirability led to conflict between different tribes over access to this resource. The hinterland provided access to plants and birds.

The Mahurangi region was initially heavily forested with kauri, which was felled for use in shipbuilding and other activities. The first European settlement in the modern Auckland Region was established due to this forest; Gordon Browne established a spar station on the Pukaouka Peninsula in the Mahurangi Harbour in 1832 with support of Hauraki Māori. In 1834 the British navy took over the station. In the 1840s and 1850s European settlers arrived in greater numbers in the Mahurangi area and began extensive logging of the forest. By 1880 shipbuilding ceased in Mahurangi. Logging moved further inland as the coastal forests were depleted until the 1930s, when the supply of kauri had been depleted.

Church Missionary Society missionaries first arrived in Mahurangi in 1833 and by the 1840s had converted most of the local Māori to Christianity.

Robert Graham was one of the first Europeans to settle in the area, after the 1841 Mahurangi purchase he bought land at Waiwera and established a hotel and bathhouse utilising the natural hotsprings to attract visitors.

== List of settlements in Mahurangi ==
- Mahurangi East
- Mahurangi West
- Matakana
- Waiwera
- Warkworth
