= Couldrey House =

Mid-19th century historic homestead, Wenderholm Regional Park, New Zealand

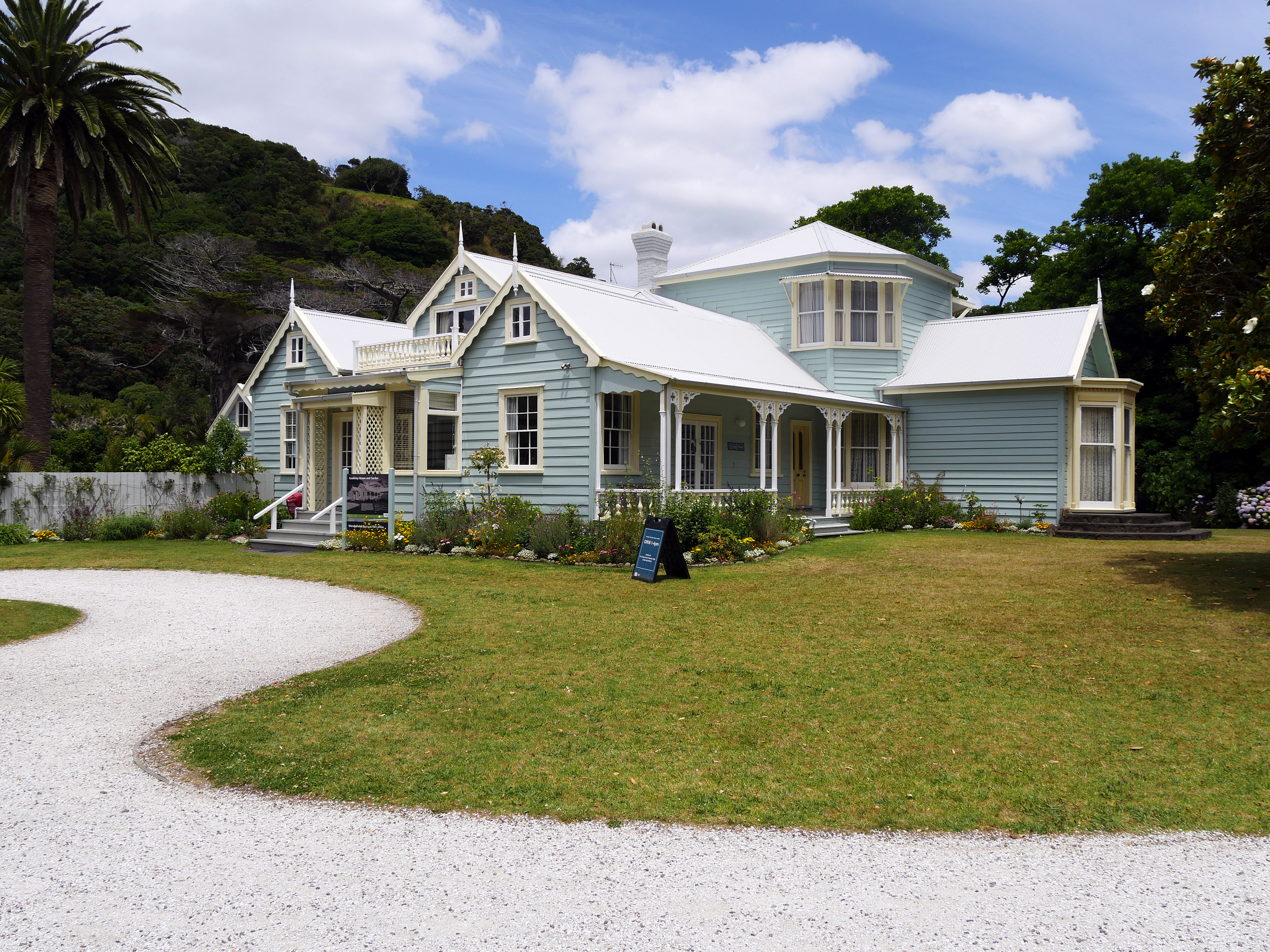
- Couldrey House
- Interactive map of the Couldrey House area
- Alternative names: Wenderholm
- Etymology: From surname of Herbert William Couldrey

General information
- Status: Public museum
- Architectural style: Victorian
- Location: Wenderholm Regional Park, 37 Schischka Road, Waiwera
- Coordinates: 36°32′00″S 174°42′40″E
- Current tenants: The Friends of Couldrey House Charitable Trust
- Completed: 1857
- Owner: Auckland Council

Couldrey House is a mid-19th century historic homestead located in the Wenderholm Regional Park, in the Auckland region of New Zealand. Couldrey House was originally built and owned by Robert Graham. The house has hosted many notable individuals including Queen Elizabeth II. In the 1980s the house was opened to the public and it currently functions as a museum.

== Description ==
The original home was built entirely from kauri. It was a single storey cottage with two gables and a shingle roof.

== History ==
Robert Graham was the first European to settle the area. Graham was a notable politician who had served as the fifth Superintendent of Auckland Province. Graham arrived in the area in 1842 and would prevent the trees, some of which being ancient, from being felled for timber. In 1857 Graham built a small holiday home. He named the house Wenderholm (Swedish for winter home). The house was originally situated near the cliffs but, in 1860 it was moved to near the current site. Moving the home required a bullock team and manpower from several marines.

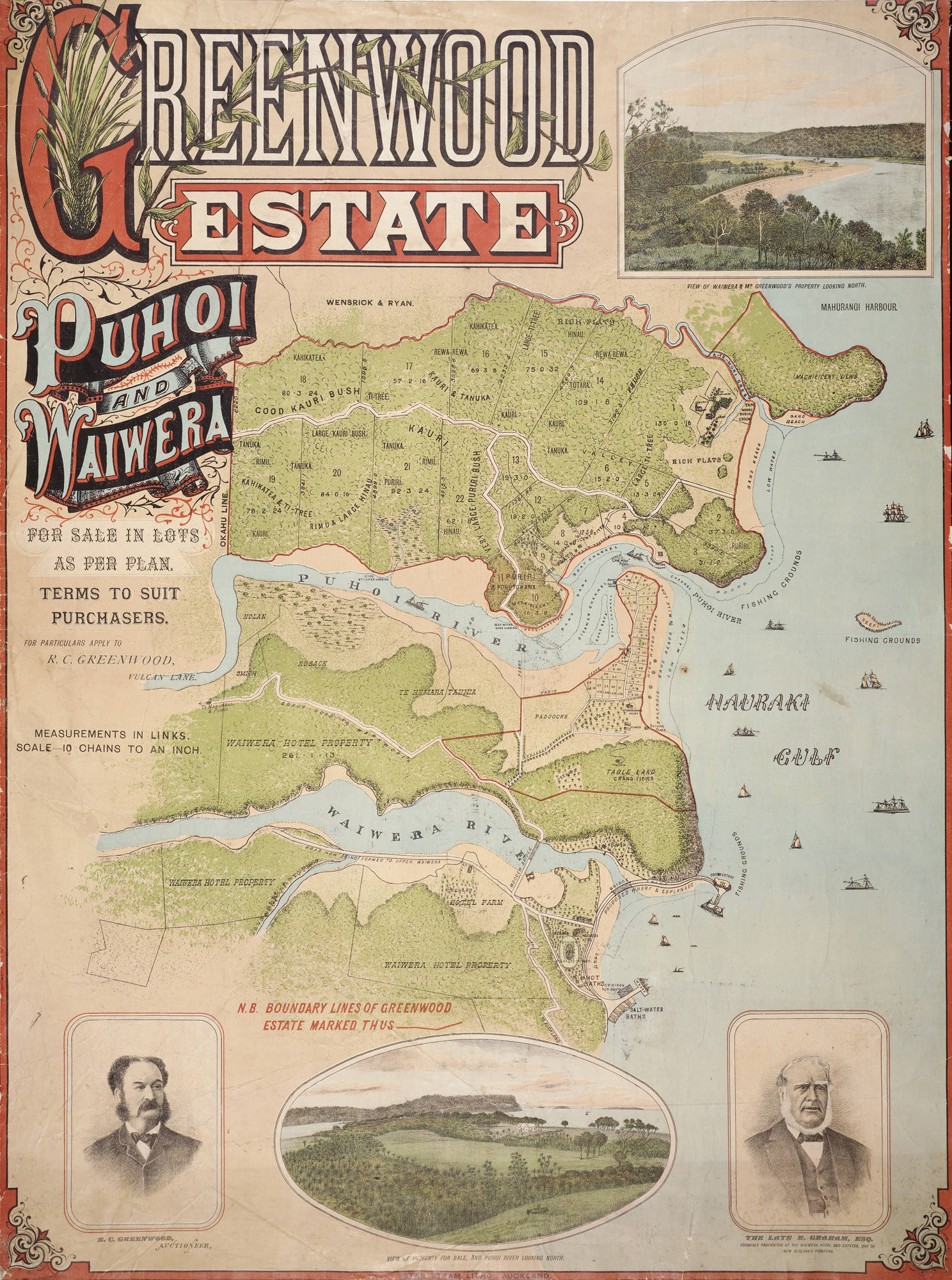
Map of proposed Greenwood Estate

Graham had a wharf constructed by his property for ships that came up the Puhoi.

During the later years of the Long Depression Graham sold the land and home to Robert Greenwood. Greenwood planned to subdivide it and sell it as the Greenwood Estate. The poor economic conditions led to this plan failing and the land north of the Puhoi River (Wenderholm) was sold to Samuel Jagger with the headland south of the river being sold to the Waiwera Company (which Graham was a part of).

Major John Whitney purchased the property as a retirement home in 1896. He would live at Wenderholm for more than 20 years after making another purchase for land owned by the Waiwera Company. Whitney had the property move to where it stands today and renovated the building by adding an old chapel onto the home to serve as a music room. The Whitneys also had a small number of house cows, sheep, donkeys, horses, and dogs.

In April 1919, Whitney left for England and sold the property to Annabella Mary Geddes after his wife had passed. Geddes was a founding member of the Royal Plunket Society and used the house as a holiday home until selling it.

In 1927, Captain Thomas Caradoc Kerry, a Pacific trader, purchased the property from Geddes. He was known to have hosted eminent guests during his time with the property. Kerry got the money to purchase Wenderholm after receiving an insurance payment in England over the beaching of the Ariadne. Lloyd's of London had taken him to court for conspiracy to defraud but he was acquitted by jury and was later paid the full £20,000. Couldrey House contains two chairs that were taken from the Ariadne.

In 1940 the house was purchased by Herbert William Couldrey. Couldrey owned a shipping company in Auckland. Between 1957 and 1960 he renovated the property and moved it onto another site. He had given it a Victorian style.

Couldrey planned to subdivide Wenderholm into several lifestyle blocks in the 1960s. Although the plan was approved by the Rodney County Council it was appealed by the Auckland Regional Authority who subsequently purchased the land in 1965 under eminent domain to serve as Auckland's first regional park. The Couldrey family remained in ownership of the home and continued to live there until 1973: when they sold the property to Auckland Regional Council. The council renamed the property Couldrey House in the family's honour.

On 23 February 1980, the three rooms of the house were opened to the public. By 1981 Couldrey House was fully opened to the public. The Friends of Couldrey House Trust has managed the property since 1990. Couldrey House had received protected heritage status with the Rodney District Council by 1997.

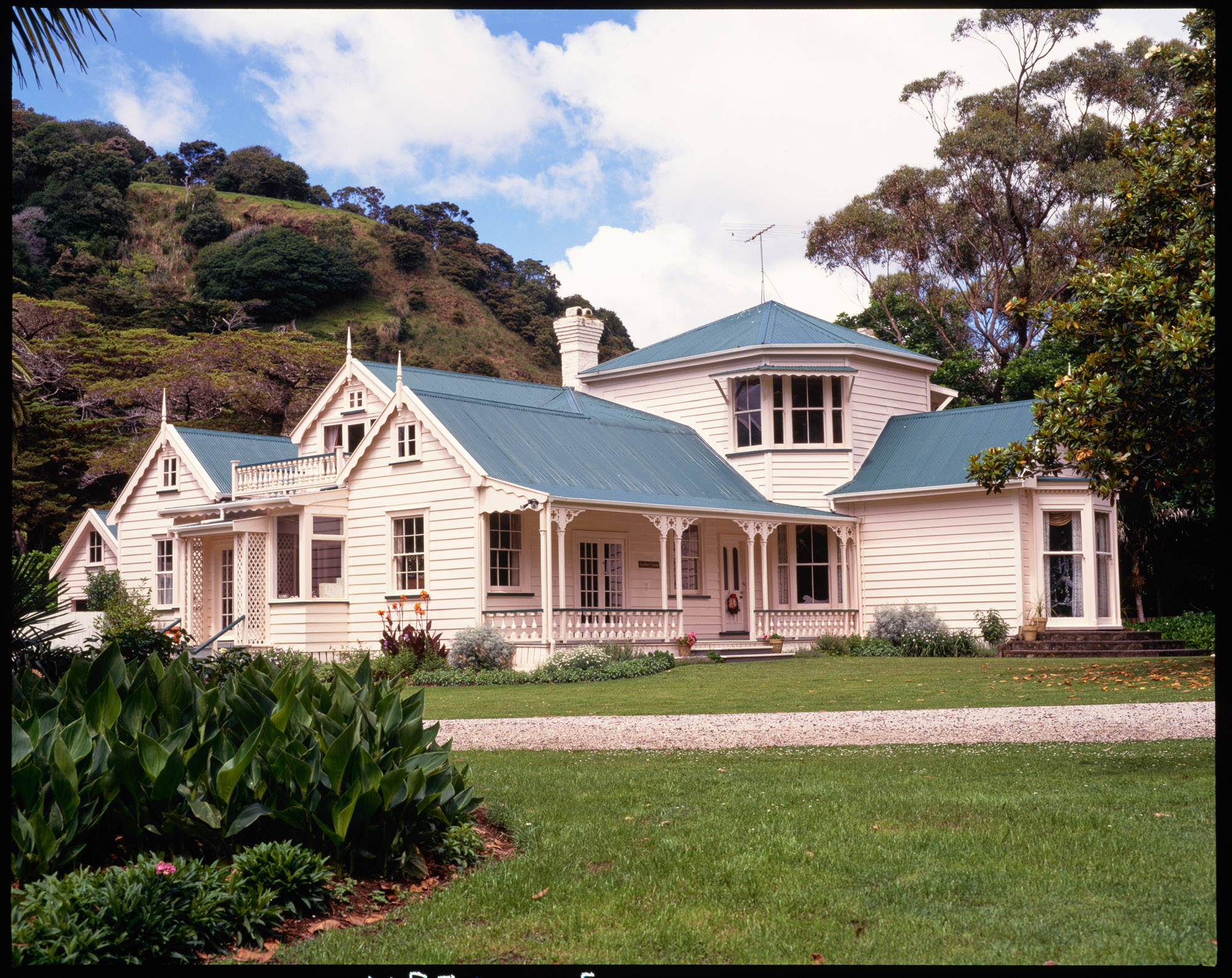
Couldrey House in 1996

Filming for an episode of the Epitaph TV series took place at Couldrey House in 1998.

In 2001 Auckland Council announced it would preserve the property as it would have been in the 1950s.

== Notable visitors ==
The house has been visited and occupied by a number of notable visitors, such as Vivien Leigh.

George Grey was a friend of Graham and visited the property regularly. He also gifted Graham kookaburras which ended up living around the property.

In 1896 Sir Henry St John Halford and his wife visited Wenderholm as guests of Major John Whitney.

Thomas Kerry hosted the wife of Lord Bledisloe.

In 1953 Queen Elizabeth II and Prince Philip visited Wenderholm and the house. On their way to the property they were greeted by a crowd of 300.

Anthony Eden visited the property in 1957 and from his suggestion Couldrey decided to renovate the property.

Other guests include Viscount Cobham, then Governor-General of New Zealand; the Duke of Argyle; and Googie Withers.
