= Waiwera River (Auckland) =

River in the Auckland Region, New Zealand

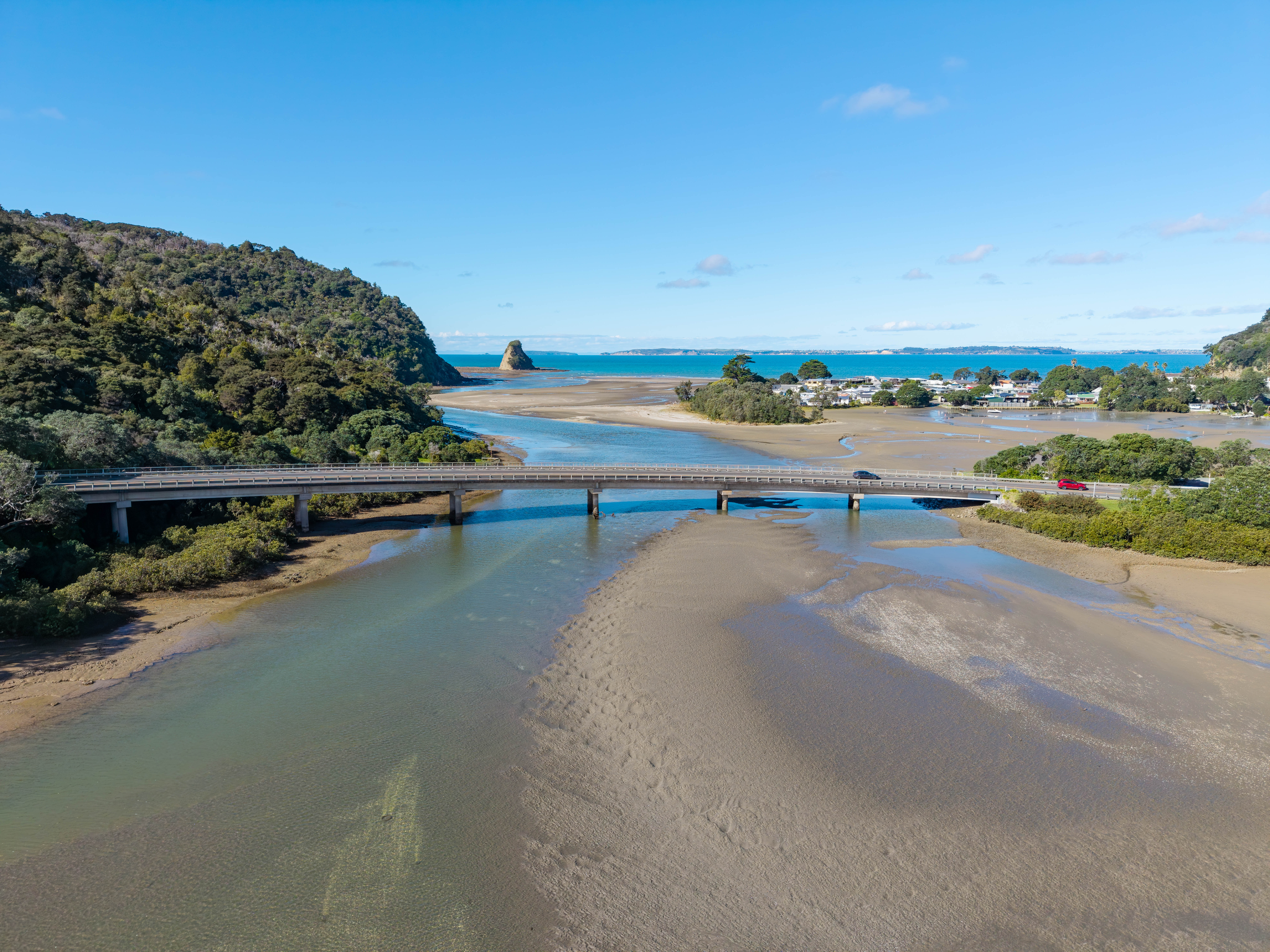
- The Waiwera River near Waiwera

- Mouth of the Waiwera River Waiwera River (Auckland) (New Zealand)
- Route of the Waiwera River

Location
- Country: New Zealand
- Region: Auckland Region

Physical characteristics
- Source
  - coordinates: 36.55534°S 174.5961°E
- Mouth: Whangaparāoa Bay
  - coordinates: 36.54148°S 174.71029°E

Basin features
- Progression: Waiwera River → Whangaparāoa Bay → Hauraki Gulf → Pacific Ocean
- Landmarks: Waiwera, Mahurangi Island
- Tributaries
  - right: Wainui Stream
- Bridges: Waiwera Bridge, Waiwera Viaduct

The Waiwera River is a stream of the Auckland Region of New Zealand's North Island, near the township of Waiwera.

== Description ==
The river begins in rural Rodney, flowing east. After passing Meales Hill, the river widens to a tidal estuary, flowing into the Hauraki Gulf between the Wenderholm Regional Park and the town of Waiwera. The mouth of the river is the tidal Waiwera Estuary, which is dominated by mangroves.

Mahurangi Island lies in the Hauraki Gulf at the river's mouth.

== History ==
The river is within the rohe of both Ngāti Manuhiri, who descend from Te Kawerau, and Ngāti Rongo, a hapū of Ngāti Whātua who came to the area from Hokianga. It was traditionally known as Awa Waiwerawera, and was used to access the inland ara (walking tracks) by waka. The wider area was traditionally known as Mahurangi, named after Mahurangi Island.

The river is the site of a battle between Ngāti Manuhiri and Ngāti Manaia (Ngāpuhi), and later the site of a peacemaking marriage between Tukituki of Ngāti Manuhiri and Rangihokaia, a rangatira of Ngāti Manaia.

An area of the southern shores was purchased by Scottish entrepreneur Robert Graham from Ngāti Rongo in 1844, where he established the Waiwera Hot Pools. The hot pools became a popular tourist destination in the 1870s, and people would be ferried to the resort along the river by John Sullivan, an early pioneer in the area.

The Waiwera Wastewater Treatment Plant was established in 1974 along the Waiwera River, receiving waste water from the township of Waiwera and releasing treated water into the river.

== See also ==
- List of rivers of New Zealand
