= List of shipwrecks in March 1868 =

The list of shipwrecks in March 1868 includes ships sunk, foundered, grounded, or otherwise lost during March 1868.

== 1 March ==
List of shipwrecks: 1 March 1868
Ship	State	Description
Hippocampi	United Kingdom	The brig foundered in the North Sea 3 nautical miles (5.6 km) east south east of Flamborough Head, Yorkshire. Her crew were rescued by the brig Shepherdess (United Kingdom). Hippocampi was on a voyage from Sheffield, Yorkshire to London.
HMS Lavinia	Royal Navy	The frigate sank in the harbor at Plymouth, Devon, after colliding with the passenger ship Cimbria (Hamburg).
Wiley Smith	United Kingdom	The schooner was driven ashore near Money Point, Nova Scotia, Canada. She was on a voyage from New York, United States to Halifax, Nova Scotia.

== 2 March ==
List of shipwrecks: 2 March 1868
Ship	State	Description
Eliza	United Kingdom	The brig was run into by the steamship Voltaic (United Kingdom) and sank at Garmoyle, County Antrim.
Sparkler	United Kingdom	The ship ran aground in the Bangka Strait. She was on a voyage from Singapore, Straits Settlements to Glasgow, Renfrewshire.
Sparkling Wave	United Kingdom	The barque was wrecked on Scroby Sands, Norfolk. Her fifteen crew and the ship's dog were rescued by the Caister Lifeboat Birmingham ( Royal National Lifeboat Institution). Sparkling Wave was on a voyage from Sunderland, County Durham to Cartagena, Spain.
St. Lawrence	United Kingdom	The barque ran aground in the Patapsco River. She was on a voyage from Baltimore, Maryland, United States to Demerara, British Guiana.
Victoria	United Kingdom	The schooner was driven ashore at Hoedekenskerke, Zeeland, Netherlands. She was on a voyage from Antwerp, Belgium to Swansea, Glamorgan. She was later refloated and taken in to Vlissingen, Zeeland.

== 3 March ==
List of shipwrecks: 3 March 1868
Ship	State	Description
Britannia	United Kingdom	The ship ran aground on the West Knock, off the north Kent coast.
Mary Ann	United Kingdom	The schooner was destroyed by fire at Antwerp, Belgium with the loss of four of the five people on board.
Una	United Kingdom	The brigantine was driven ashore at Bexhill, Sussex. She was on a voyage from Hull, Yorkshire to Swansea, Glamorgan. Una was refloated on 10 March and towed in to Rye, Sussex, where she arrived the next day.
Vesper	United Kingdom	The brig was wrecked at "Hiertdals", near Thisted, Denmark. She was on a voyage from Newcastle upon Tyne, Northumberland to Copenhagen, Denmark.
William Broderick	United Kingdom	The ship was driven ashore at Högby, Sweden. She was on a voyage from Söderhamn, Sweden to Middlesbrough, Yorkshire.

== 4 March ==
List of shipwrecks: 4 March 1868
Ship	State	Description
Anne and Jane	United Kingdom	The ship was run ashore at Eyemouth, Berwickshire. She was on a voyage from Newcastle upon Tyne to Leith, Lothian. She had broken up by 9 Mach.
Rapid	United Kingdom	The ship struck rocks at Montrose, Forfarshire. She was on a voyage from Easdale, in the Slate Islands to Montrose. She was refloated and towed in to Dundee, Forfarshire.
Water Lily	United Kingdom	The brig was driven ashore on Læsø, Denmark. She was on a voyage from Blyth, Northumberland to Rostock.

== 5 March ==
List of shipwrecks: 5 March 1868
Ship	State	Description
Globe	United Kingdom	The ship collided with Sophia ( Rostock) and sank in the Kattegat. Her crew were rescued by Karl Friedrich (Norway). Globe was on a voyage from Hull, Yorkshire to Danzig.
Halicore	United Kingdom	The brig was wrecked off Morant Bay, Jamaica. Her crew survived. She was on a voyage from Blyth, Northumberland to Sagua La Grande, Cuba.
Rubia	United Kingdom	The steamship was driven ashore and wrecked at Ostend, West Flanders. All on board survived.
Spirit of the Sea	United Kingdom	The ship departed from Sydney, New South Wales for Hong Kong. No further trace, presumed foundered with the loss of all hands.

== 6 March ==
List of shipwrecks: 6 March 1868
Ship	State	Description
Isabella Steward	United Kingdom	The ship ran aground on the West Hoyle Bank, in Liverpool Bay. Her crew were rescued. She was on a voyage from a Scottish port to Liverpool, Lancashire. She was refloated the next day and taken in to Hoylake, Cheshire.
Pearl	United Kingdom	The ship was wrecked on the Minsenerolde Oog, in the North Sea. She was on a voyage from Hartlepool, County Durham to Bremerhaven.
Unnamed	United Kingdom	The barge was run down and sunk in the River Thames at Blackwall, Middlesex by the steamship Somersetshire (United Kingdom). She was refloated the next day and beached.

== 7 March ==
List of shipwrecks: 7 March 1868
Ship	State	Description
Lapwing	United Kingdom	The schooner foundered in the North Sea north of Berwick upon Tweed, Northumberland. Her crew were rescued by the tug Berwick (United Kingdom). Lapwing was on a voyage from Sunderland, County Durham to the River Tay.
Matilda	Sweden	The brigantine was wrecked on Antigua. She was on a voyage from Saint Barthélemy and/or Barbados to New York, United States.

== 8 March ==
List of shipwrecks: 8 March 1868
Ship	State	Description
James C. Bell	United Kingdom	The ship was wrecked near Port Isaac, Cornwall. Her crew were rescued. She was on a voyage from Liverpool, Lancashire to Bombay, India.
Nepaul	United Kingdom	The ship was driven ashore at Algiers, Algeria. She was on a voyage from Sunderland, County Durham to Algiers. She was later refloated and taken in to Algiers for repairs.
Susannah	United Kingdom	The ship was driven ashore. She was on a voyage from Hamburg to Sunderland, County Durham. She was refloated on 10 March but struck a sunken wreck and was damaged. She completed her voyage in a leaky condition.
Vicata	United Kingdom	The ship was driven ashore at San Francisco, California, United States. She was on a voyage from San Francisco to Liverpool, Lancashire. She was consequently condemned.

== 9 March ==
List of shipwrecks: 9 March 1868
Ship	State	Description
Alcaig	United Kingdom	The ship departed from Liverpool, Lancashire for Lagos, Africa. No further trace, presumed foundered with the loss of all hands.
Isabella Scott	United Kingdom	The ship was lost in the Weser. Her crew were rescued. She was on a voyage from Hartlepool, County Durham to Bremen.
Levant	United Kingdom	The ship was driven ashore near Vlissingen, Zeeland, Netherlands. She was on a voyage from Antwerp, Belgium to Cardiff, Glamorgan. She was refloated on 21 March and towed back to Antwerp.
Margaret	United Kingdom	The lighter sprang a leak and sank. Her crew were rescued. She was on a voyage from Glasgow, Renfrewshire to the Kyles of Bute, Argyllshire.
Refuge	United Kingdom	The ship ran aground on the Kalloot Bank, off the coast of Zeeland, Netherlands. She was on a voyage from Antwerp to Cardiff. She was refloated on 23 March and towed in to Vlissingen, Zeeland.

== 10 March ==
List of shipwrecks: 10 March 1868
Ship	State	Description
Carysfort	United Kingdom	The ship sank off Garston, Lancashire. She was on a voyage from Arklow, County Wicklow to Garston.
Catherine	United Kingdom	The ship sank off "Table Land". She was on a voyage from Liverpool, Lancashire to Carmarthen.
Victoria	United Kingdom	The ship was wrecked at Portishead, Somerset.

== 11 March ==
List of shipwrecks: 11 March 1868
Ship	State	Description
Admiral Jervis	United Kingdom	The schooner sprang a leak and sank in the River Medway at Rochester, Kent.
Atlanta	United Kingdom	The barque ran aground on the Upper Middle Patch, in the Humber, capsized and sank. Her crew were rescued. She was on a voyage from Hull, Yorkshire to Aden.
Atlas	United Kingdom	The ship ran aground at Hartlepool, County Durham. She was on a voyage from London to Hartlepool. She was refloated and taken in to Hartlepool.
Edward Graham	United Kingdom	The ship was driven ashore in a cyclone at Mauritius and was wrecked.
Henry	United Kingdom	The ship sank off The Platters, Anglesey. Her crew were rescued. She was on a voyage from Runcorn, Cheshire to Plymouth, Devon.
La Plata	United Kingdom	The steamship ran aground off Saint Thomas, Virgin Islands.
Lorenzo	United Kingdom	The ship was driven ashore near New Orleans, Louisiana, United States. She was on a voyage from New Orleans to Liverpool, Lancashire. She was refloated on 24 March and resumed her voyage.
Mauritius	United Kingdom	The steamship was driven ashore and wrecked at Port-Louis, Mauritius during a cyclone.
Nouvelle Helvétie	United States	The ship was driven ashore and severely damaged at Ballyteague, County Kildare, United Kingdom. Her crew were rescued. She was on a voyage from New Orleans to Liverpool.
Paul et Louis	France	The schooner was in distress off the Channel Islands. More than 30 passengers were taken off by the steamship Normandy (United Kingdom), which towed the schooner in to Saint Helier, Jersey. Paul et Louis was on a voyage from Saint-Malo, Ille-et-Vilaine to the Newfoundland Colony.
Pike	United Kingdom	The ship ran aground at Hartlepool. She was on a voyage from Shoreham-by-Sea, Sussex to Hartlepool. She was refloated and taken in to Hartlepool.
Serca	United Kingdom	The ship foundered in the Indian Ocean 300 nautical miles (560 km) south west of Mauritius. Her crew were rescued. She was on a voyage from Liverpool to Aden.
Tudor	United Kingdom	The ship was destroyed by fire at Callao, Peru. She was on a voyage from the Chincha Islands to a European port.

== 12 March ==
List of shipwrecks: 12 March 1868
Ship	State	Description
Annie	United Kingdom	The ship was holed by ice and severely damaged at Philadelphia, Pennsylvania, United States.
Gozo	United Kingdom	The steamship was driven ashore at "Surnemund", Prussia. She was on a voyage from Hull to Stettin.
Serica	United Kingdom	The ship foundered in the Indian Ocean 300 nautical miles (560 km) south west of Mauritius in a typhoon with the loss of four lives. She was on a voyage from Liverpool, Lancashire to Aden.
Wolga	Russia	The steamship foundered 30 nautical miles (56 km) west south west of "Nussima". The 23 people on board took to two boats. One boat reached the coast of Japan, the other boat, with thirteen people on board was reported missing.
No. 1	Prussia	The brig ran aground on The Shingles, off the Isle of Wight, United Kingdom. She was on a voyage from London to Galaţi, Ottoman Empire. She was refloated and taken in to Yarmouth, Isle of Wight.

== 13 March ==
List of shipwrecks: 13 March 1868
Ship	State	Description
Alexandria	United Kingdom	The ship ran aground on the Cork Sand, in the North Sea off the coast of Suffolk. She was on a voyage from Alexandria, Egypt to Harwich, Essex. She was refloated and taken in to Harwich.
Ceres	Wismar	The ship was driven ashore near "Warbeck". She was on a voyage from Newcastle upon Tyne, Northumberland, United Kingdom to Lübeck.
Helen	United Kingdom	The smack was driven ashore near Campbeltown, Argyllshire. She was on a voyage from Ardrossan, Ayrshire to Campbeltown.
Pleiades	United Kingdom	The barque was driven ashore near Moville, County Donegal. She was on a voyage from Londonderry to Baltimore, Maryland, United States. She was refloated and towed in to Londonderry in a leaky condition.
Rudolph	Prussia	The ship ran aground at Goole, Yorkshire, United Kingdom. She was on a voyage from Agrigento, Sicily, Italy to Goole.
S. van Heel	Netherlands	The ship ran aground off Ramsgate, Kent, United Kingdom. She was on a voyage from South Shields, County Durham, United Kingdom to Batavia, Netherlands East Indies. She was refloated the next day and taken in to Ramsgate.
William	Denmark	The schooner foundered off Kristiansand, Norway. She was on a voyage from Copenhagen to Iceland.

== 14 March ==
List of shipwrecks: 14 March 1868
Ship	State	Description
Annie E. Boyd	United States	The ship sank at Philadelphia, Pennsylvania.
Baron Hambro'	United Kingdom	The steamship ran aground off Dragør, Denmark. She was on a voyage from Stettin to an English port.
Eliza	Spain	The steamship was wrecked at the mouth of the Andar. She was on a voyage from Cádiz to Liverpool, Lancashire, United Kingdom.
Elvira Gianello	Italy	The barque was wrecked at "Saint Antonia", Chile. There were twelve survivors. She was on a voyage from Buenos Aires, Argentina to Valparaíso, Chile.
Golden Horn	United Kingdom	The steamship was driven ashore south of Sulina, Ottoman Empire. Her crew were rescued by the Sulina Lifeboat.
Marion	United Kingdom	The ship ran aground on the Maplin Sand, in the North Sea off the coast of Essex. She was on a voyage from Rochester, Kent to Hull, Yorkshire. She was refloated and assisted in to Harwich, Essex in a leaky condition.
Tecumseh	United Kingdom	The ship was sighted whilst on a voyage from Liverpool, Lancashire to Boston, Massachusetts, United States. No further trace, presumed foundered with the loss of all hands.
Two Friends	United Kingdom	The schooner ran aground in the Milford Haven Waterway. She was on a voyage from Milford Haven, Pembrokeshire to Londonderry.
Vaarwel	Netherlands	The fishing smack was run down and sunk in the Dogger Bank by the steamship Stettin (United Kingdom) with the loss of four of her twelve crew. Survivors were rescued by Stettin.

== 15 March ==
List of shipwrecks: 15 March 1868
Ship	State	Description
Agnes	United Kingdom	The collier collided with a barque and sank in the River Mersey off New Brighton, Cheshire. Her crew were rescued by Cuba (United Kingdom). Agnes was on a voyage from Garston, Lancashire to Bangor.
Cornucopia	Canada	The ship was wrecked on Long Cay.
Cruiser	United Kingdom	The ship foundered off Mandal, Norway. Her crew were rescued. She was on a voyage from Hartlepool, County Durham to Pillau, Prussia.
Curfew, and Eider	United Kingdom	The ships collided off South Shields, County Durham and were both severely damaged. They put in to the River Tyne. Curfew was on a voyage from the River Wear to Dundee, Forfarshire. Eider was on a voyage from South Shields to Great Yarmouth, Norfolk.
Fokkelina Emmelina	Prussia	The ship ran aground on the Heilsand, in the North Sea. She was on a voyage from London, United Kingdom to Glückstadt. She was later refloated and taken in to Cuxhaven.

== 16 March ==
List of shipwrecks: 16 March 1868
Ship	State	Description
Harry Kelly	United Kingdom	The steamship was driveh ashore 4 nautical miles (7.4 km) south of Bridlington, Yorkshire.
Jack Tar	United Kingdom	The ship ran aground at Teignmouth, Devon. She was on a voyage from Teignmouth to London. She was refloated and resumed her voyage.
Lady of Love	United Kingdom	The ship ran aground on the Barnhourie Sandbank, off the coast of Wigtownshire. She was on a voyage from Liverpool, Lancashire to Dumfries.
Lumley	United Kingdom	The brig was driven ashore near Scalby, Yorkshire. She was on a voyage from South Shields, County Durham to Odesa, Russia. She was refloated and towed in to Scarborough, Yorkshire.
Prince Consort	United Kingdom	The brig ran aground on the Longsand, in the North Sea off the coast of Essex. She was later refloated and assisted in to Ramsgate, Kent by the smacks Elizabeth and Increase (both United Kingdom).
Pyrrha	United Kingdom	The ship departed from Alexandria, Egypt for Falmouth, Cornwall or Queenstown, County Cork. No further trace, presumed foundered with the loss of all hands.
Regulus	United Kingdom	The ship was driven ashore at Trelleborg, Sweden. She was on a voyage from Stettin to West Hartlepool, County Durham. She was refloated.

== 17 March ==
List of shipwrecks: 17 March 1868
Ship	State	Description
Celerity	United Kingdom	The ship ran aground at Pillau, Prussia. She was on a voyage from Middlesbrough, Yorkshire to Pillau. She was refloated the next day.
Cerica	United Kingdom	The ship foundered between the Cape of Good Hope, Cape Colony and Madagascar with the loss of four lives.
Creole	United States	The 1,229-gross register ton screw steamer was wrecked in fog without loss of life on the coast of New Jersey. A wreck in 20 feet (6 m) of water just off Bay Head, New Jersey, nicknamed "Bluff's Wreck" may be the wreck of Creole.
Elizabeth	United Kingdom	The ship departed from New York, United States for Liverpool, Lancashire. No further trace, presumed foundered with the loss of all hands.
Henriette	United Kingdom	The ship was driven ashore and wrecked on Husum, Prussia. She was on a voyage from Wöhrden, Prussia to the Firth of Forth.
John Isabella	United Kingdom	The ship collided with Concordia (United Kingdom)n and sank in the English Channel off Beachy Head, Sussex. Her crew were rescued by Concordia. John Isabella was on a voyage from South Shields, County Durham to Gibraltar.
Star of Hope	United Kingdom	The ship ran aground on Bornholm, Denmark. She was on a voyage from Pillau, Prussia to Dundee, Forfarshire. She was refloated on 20 March and taken in to Allinge, Denmark in a leaky condition.

== 18 March ==
List of shipwrecks: 18 March 1868
Ship	State	Description
Anne Marie	United Kingdom	The ship sank of Hirtshals, Denmark with the loss of all hands. She was on a voyage from Stockholm, Sweden to Hull, Yorkshire.
Juno	Prussia	The ship was driven ashore at Duncannon, County Wexford, United Kingdom.
Look Out	United Kingdom	The ship was driven ashore. She was on a voyage from Glasgow, Renfrewshire to Ayr.
Magnolia	United States	The steamboat suffered a boiler explosion 12 nautical miles (22 km) upstream of New York and was destroyed with the loss of at least 40 of the 160 people on board. There were at least 57 survivors. She was on a voyage from New York to Cincinnati, Ohio.
Mathilde	Denmark	The ship ran aground on the Haisborough Sands, in the North Sea off the coast of Norfolk, United Kingdom. She was on a voyage from Varberg, Sweden to London, United Kingdom. She was refloated on 20 March and assisted in to Great Yarmouth, Norfolk in a leaky condition.
Paragon	United Kingdom	The ship ran aground at Harwich, Essex. She was on a voyage from Lowestoft, Suffolk to Poole, Dorset. She was refloated.

== 19 March ==
List of shipwrecks: 19 March 1868
Ship	State	Description
Alice	United Kingdom	The ship was driven ashore 12 nautical miles (22 km) north of Libava, Courland Governorate. Her crew were rescued. She was on a voyage from Newcastle upon Tyne, Northumberland to Riga, Russia.
Boadicea	United Kingdom	The ship ran aground on St. George's Island, Massachusetts, United States. She was on a voyage from Puerto Rico to Boston, Massachusetts. She was refloated and taken in to Boston in a waterlogged condition.
Express	(United Kingdom of Great Britain and Ireland) New Zealand	The 149-ton brigantine was wrecked at Port Hutt in the Chatham Islands. All hands were saved.
Fernand	France	The barque was run down and sunk off The Lizard, Cornwall, United Kingdom. Her crew were rescued. She was on a voyage from Fécamp, Seine-Inférieure to the Newfoundland Colony.
Fortitude	United Kingdom	The ship was wrecked at Skeld, Shetland Islands. Her crew were rescued.
Growler	Flag unknown	The 48.5 ton schooner departed Victoria, Colony of British Columbia, bound for Sitka, Department of Alaska, but never arrived. Wreckage of and bodies from the ship later washed ashore on the southern end of Prince of Wales Island in the Alexander Archipelago in Southeast Alaska.
Hartley	United Kingdom	The brig was driven ashore north of Helsingør, Denmark. She was on a voyage from St. Davids, Pembrokeshire to Danzig.
Lucia	United Kingdom	The brig was wrecked at Thisted, Denmark. She was on a voyage from Newcastle upon Tyne, Northumberland to Aalborg, Denmark.
Merces	Danzig	The barque was driven ashore north of Helsingør. She was on a voyage from Newcastle upon Tyne to Swinemünde, Prussia.
Monarch	United Kingdom	The ship was driven ashore at Mablethorpe, Lincolnshire. She was on a voyage from Ipswich, Suffolk to Howdendyke, Yorkshire.
Neptune	United Kingdom	The ship was driven ashore 12 nautical miles (22 km) north of Libava. She was on a voyage from Pillau, Prussia to Ventspils, Courland Governorate.

== 20 March ==
List of shipwrecks: 20 March 1868
Ship	State	Description
Elizabeth and Harriet	United Kingdom	The ship collided with the brig Sultan (United Kingdom) and sank in the North Sea off Orfordness, Suffolk. Her crew were rescued by a smack.
Excelsior	United Kingdom	The ship was lost. She was on a voyage from London to Caen, Calvados, France.
Mary Frances	United Kingdom	The ship was wrecked at Shanghai, China. She was on a voyage from Cardiff, Glamorgan to Shanghai.

== 21 March ==
List of shipwrecks: 21 March 1868
Ship	State	Description
Carlisle	United Kingdom	The ship was damaged by fire at Bombay, India.
Conway Castle	United Kingdom	The ship ran aground on the Blackwater Bank, in the Irish Sea. She was on a voyage from Glasgow, Renfrewshire to Melbourne, Victoria. She was refloated with assistance from the Cahore and Wexford Lifeboats and a tug and resumed her voyage.
Dove	United Kingdom	The ship collided with the barque Arlington (United States) and sank 40 nautical miles (74 km) north north west of the Longships, Cornwall with the loss of three of her five crew. Survivors were rescued by Arlington.
Florence Nightingale	United Kingdom	The brig was driven ashore on Hveen, Sweden. She was on a voyage from Blyth, Northumberland to Copenhagen, Denmark. She was refloated with the assistance of a steamship and taken in tow for Copenhagen.
Matilda	United Kingdom	The fishing cutter collided with the steamship Kirklass (United Kingdom) and sank in the River Liffey. She had been refloated by 30 March.
Montagu	United Kingdom	The steamship was driven ashore near Wexford.
Sea Bird	United Kingdom	The ship sank in Morte Bay with the loss of all hands.
Success	Belgium	The ship was wrecked on the Kentish Knock. She was on a voyage from Antwerp to Akyab, Burma.

== 22 March ==
List of shipwrecks: 22 March 1868
Ship	State	Description
Albana	United Kingdom	The ship was abandoned in the North Sea off Tynemouth Castle, Northumberland. Her crew were rescued on 25 March by Drie Gezusters (Netherlands).
Peacock	United Kingdom	The ship was driven ashore at "Wilton", Prussia.

== 23 March ==
List of shipwrecks: 23 March 1868
Ship	State	Description
Cape Clear	United Kingdom	The ship was sighted in the Pacific Ocean whilst on a voyage from San Antonio, Chile to Queenstown, County Cork. No further trace, presumed foundered with the loss of all hands.
Dragoon	United Kingdom	The ship ran aground at Sulina, Ottoman Empire. She was on a voyage from Sulina to Galaţi. On being refloated, she was run into by the steamship Thomas Snowden (United Kingdom) and sank.
ARP Igurey	Paraguayan Navy	Paraguayan War: The gunboat was sunk in the Chaco River by Barroso, Pará, and Rio Grande (all Imperial Brazilian Navy).
Lady of Lune	United Kingdom	The ship was driven ashore near Dumfries.
Maude	United Kingdom	The barque foundered in the Mediterranean Sea 100 nautical miles (190 km) east of Malta. Her crew were rescued by the brig Emma (Prussia). Maude was on a voyage from Alexandria, Egypt to Falmouth, Cornwall.
ARP Tacuary	Paraguayan Navy	Paraguayan War: The gunboat was sunk in the Chacos River by Barroso, Pará, and Rio Grande (all Imperial Brazilian Navy).
Vine	United Kingdom	The ship was abandoned in the North Sea. She was on a voyage from Hartlepool, County Durham to the Weser.

== 24 March ==
List of shipwrecks: 24 March 1868
Ship	State	Description
Fly	(United Kingdom of Great Britain and Ireland) New Zealand	The cutter was driven ashore and wrecked at Oamaru. All hands were saved.
Jabez	United Kingdom	The brig ran aground on the Dutchaman's Bank, in the Menai Strait with the loss of her captain. Eight survivors were rescued by the Penmon Lifeboat. She was on a voyage from Liverpool, Lancashire to Palma de Mallorca, Spain.
Lord Seaton	United Kingdom	The barque sank off Cabo de Santa Maria, Portugal. Her crew survived. She was on a voyage from Adra, Spain to Newcastle upon Tyne, Northumberland.
Prairie Flower	United Kingdom	The brig capsized and sank at Newport, Monmouthshire. She was righted and refloated.
Unnamed	Flag unknown	The schooner ran aground on the Dutchman's Bank.

== 25 March ==
List of shipwrecks: 25 March 1868
Ship	State	Description
Alliance	(United Kingdom of Great Britain and Ireland) Jersey	The ship collided with J. M. Strachan (United Kingdom and sank in the North Sea off Scarborough, Yorkshire. Her crew were rescued by J. M. Strachan. Alliance was on a voyage from London to Tynemouth, Northumberland.
Black Diamond	United Kingdom	The collier, a steamship, ran aground and broke in two in the River Thames at the entrance to the Regent's Canal.
Hecla	United Kingdom	The brig ran aground at Southend-on-Sea, Essex. She was refloated.
Irwell	United Kingdom	The steamship ran ashore on Rønne, Denmark. She was on a voyage from Hull, Yorkshire to Danzig. She was refloated the next day and resumed her voyage.
Pacific	United Kingdom	The schooner was driven ashore and sank at Ballyhack, County Wexford. She was on a voyage from Kilrush, County Clare to Dublin. She was refloated on 6 April and towed in to Waterford for repairs.
Swift	United Kingdom	The brig ran aground south of Ayr. She was on a voyage from Belfast, County Antrim to Ayr. She was refloated on 28 March and taken in to Ayr the next day.

== 26 March ==
List of shipwrecks: 26 March 1868
Ship	State	Description
Grace	United Kingdom	The brig collided with Verona (United Kingdom) and sank off the Elbe No. 2 Lightship (Hamburg) with the loss of a crew member. Survivors were rescued by Verona.
Ogmore	United Kingdom	The steamship struck the Fairey Rock and was beached at Porthcawl, Glamorgan. She was on a voyage from Highbridge, Somerset to Porthcawl. She was refloated and taken in to Swansea, where she was found to be severely damaged.
Sarah	United Kingdom	The ship was wrecked near Philippeville, Algeria. Her crew were rescued. She was on a voyage from Alexandria, Egypt to Oran, Algeria.
Selina	United Kingdom	The brig was wrecked on the Outer Stag Rocks, off the coast of Cornwall with the loss of four of her six crew. Survivors were rescued by the Lizard Lifeboat. She was on a voyage from Swansea, Glamorgan to Par, Cornwall.

== 27 March ==
List of shipwrecks: 27 March 1868
Ship	State	Description
Comet	(United Kingdom of Great Britain and Ireland) New Zealand	The 17-ton cutter was wrecked at the mouth of the Puhoi River.
Maria	United Kingdom	The ship was driven ashore at Sanlúcar de Barrameda, Spain. She was on a voyage from Maryport, Cumberland to Seville, Spain.
Palmers	United Kingdom	The ship was driven ashore at Kessingland, Suffolk. Her crew were rescued.
Rachel	United Kingdom	The ship ran aground on the Maplin Sand, in the North Sea off the coast of Essex.
Sarah	United Kingdom	The Thames barge collided with the sloop Britannia (United Kingdom and sank in the River Thames at Blackwall, Middlesex. She was refloated on 30 March and repaired.
Sarah Jane	United Kingdom	The brig was wrecked at Philippeville, Algeria. Her crew were ashore at the time.
Selina	United Kingdom	The schooner was wrecked on the Outer Stag Rocks, on the coast of Cornwall with the loss of four of her crew. She was on a voyage from Swansea, Glamorgan to Par, Cornwall.
William	United Kingdom	The brigantine sprang a leak and foundered in the North Sea 56 nautical miles (104 km) east by north of Spurn Point, Yorkshire. Her crew were rescued by the smack Henry Smethurst (United Kingdom). William was on a voyage from Newcastle upon Tyne, Northumberland to Hanover, Prussia.

== 28 March ==
List of shipwrecks: 28 March 1868
Ship	State	Description
Indian	United Kingdom	The ship sprang a leak and was beached at Lowestoft, Suffolk. Her nine crew were rescued. She was on a voyage from South Shields, County Durham to Havre de Grâce, Seine-Inférieure, France.
Ocean Wave	United Kingdom	The ship ran aground on the Maplin Sand, in the North Sea off the coast of Essex. She was refloated.
Wave	United Kingdom	The schooner ran aground on the Inner Barber Sand, in the North Sea off the coast of Norfolk. Her four crew were rescued by the Caister Lifeboat Birmingham ( Royal National Lifeboat Institution). Wave was on a voyage from Ipswich, Suffolk to Inverness. She was refloated and taken in to Great Yarmouth, Norfolk.
William McGowan	United Kingdom	The ship ran aground on the Maplin Sand. She was refloated.
Young England	United Kingdom	The ship was abandoned in the Indian Ocean. Her crew were rescued by the barque Zanzibar (Hamburg). Young England was on a voyage from Newport, Monmouthshire to Hong Kong.

== 29 March ==
List of shipwrecks: 29 March 1868
Ship	State	Description
Eliza	United Kingdom	The ship sprang a leak and was abandoned off the Blasquets. Her crew were rescued. She was on a voyage from Kilrush, County Clare to Broadhaven Bay. Eliza was discovered off Bandon, County Cork in a derelict condition. She was towed in to Kilrush.
Herman	Prussia	The ship was driven ashore and wrecked on Rügen. She was on a voyage from Newcastle upon Tyne, Northumberland, United Kingdom to Stralsund.
Jessie Brown	United Kingdom	The steamship ran aground on the Long Rock, off Ballywalter, County Antrim. She was on a voyage from Morecambe, Lancashire to Ballycastle, County Antrim. She was refloated and taken in to Ardrossan, Ayrshire in a leaky condition.
William Orme	United Kingdom	The smack [[sprang a leak and sank in the Irish Sea off Fleetwood, Lancashire]]. Her crew were rescued. She was on a voyage from Liverpool, Lancashire to Ravenglass, Cumberland.

== 30 March ==
List of shipwrecks: 30 March 1868
Ship	State	Description
Mathilde	Denmark	The ship was driven ashore at Ringkøbing. She was on a voyage from Aarhus to London, United Kingdom.
Pekela	Netherlands	The ship was driven ashore and wrecked at Morup, Sweden. Her crew were rescued. She was on a voyage from London to Stettin.
Thistle	(United Kingdom of Great Britain and Ireland) New Zealand	The cutter was wrecked at Bream Head during a heavy sea. Two passengers drowned.

== 31 March ==
List of shipwrecks: 31 March 1868
Ship	State	Description
Atlas	United Kingdom	The schooner ran aground off Duncannon, County Wexford. She was on a voyage from Waterford to Dublin. She was refloated and resumed her voyage.
John Brewster	United Kingdom	The ship was sighted off Gibraltar whilst on a voyage from Enos, Ottoman Empire to London. No further trace, presumed foundered with the loss of all hands.

== Unknown date ==
List of shipwrecks: Unknown date in March 1868
Ship	State	Description
Admiral	United Kingdom	The ship was wrecked at Bermuda before 10 March. She was on a voyage from Savannah, Georgia, United States to Liverpool, Lancashire.
Aga Bagh	India	The ship was wrecked in the Hooghly River. She was on a voyage from Calcutta to Muscat, Sultanate of Muscat and Oman.
Amis et Marie	France	The ship sank at Fécamp, Seine-Inférieure. She was on a voyage from London United Kingdom to Pontrieux, Côtes-du-Nord.
Benjamin Attwood	United Kingdom	The steamship collided with a French steamship and sank off Sinope, Ottoman Empire.
Beta	Newfoundland Colony	The ship was wrecked at "Tonela".
Brilliante Eugenie	United Kingdom	The ship foundered in the Mediterranean Sea 30 nautical miles (56 km) off Sicily, Italy. Her crew were rescued.
Concordia	Netherlands	The ship was destroyed by fire at Buenos Aires, Argentina.
Consort	United Kingdom	The brig ran aground on the Longsand, in the North Sea off the coast of Essex. She was refloated with assistance from the smacks Elizabeth and Increase (both United Kingdom).
Cossack	United Kingdom	The ship was wrecked at Morant Bay, Jamaica. She was on a voyage from Greenock, Renfrewshire to Matanzas, Cuba.
Dragon	United Kingdom	The steamship collided with the steamship Thomas Snowdown (United Kingdom and sank in the Danube.
Elizabeth Wright	United Kingdom	The ship was driven ashore near Peterhead, Aberdeenshire and was abandoned by her crew. She later sank.
Fulton	United Kingdom	The ship ran aground at Catania, Sicily. She was on a voyage from Trieste to Pernambuco, Brazil. She was refloated.
Loreno	United Kingdom	The ship was driven ashore near Rangoon, Burma. She was refloated and found to be severely damaged.
Margaret	United Kingdom	The ship departed from Sunderland, County Durham for Aberdeen. No further trace, presumed foundered with the loss of all hands.
Maria Frances	United Kingdom	The ship was wrecked at Shanghai, China before 31 March.
Mount Zion	United Kingdom	The ship ran aground on the Maplin Sand, in the North Sea off the coast of Essex. She was refloated on 26 March.
Oceola	United Kingdom	The barque was run into by the steamship Dahkalieh ( (Ottoman Empire) Egypt) and sank in the Sea of Marmara with the loss of five of her crew. Survivors were rescued by Dahkalieh.
Sophie	United Kingdom	The ship brig was wrecked near Berwick upon Tweed, Northumberland.
Southern Queen	United Kingdom	The ship was driven ashore at Bombay, India. She was on a voyage from Liverpool to Bombay. She was refloated and taken in to Bombay in a severely leaky condition.
Triumph	(United Kingdom of Great Britain and Ireland) New Zealand	The schooner was driven against Kaikōura wharf during a storm and sank.
Viscata	United Kingdom	The ship was driven ashore near San Francisco, California, United States. She was on a voyage from San Francisco to Liverpool.
Wallasey	United Kingdom	The ship was abandoned off Cape Horn, Chile before 14 March. Her crew were rescued by the barque Elvira Gianello (Italy), but only five were to survive the wrecking of that vessel. Wallasey was on a voyage from the Chincha Islands to Queenstown, County Cork.
Walsoken	United Kingdom	The barque ran aground on the Longsand. She was refloated with assistance from a fleet of smacks, including Robert Owen (United Kingdom.
