= Mahurangi Island =

Island in New Zealand

Native name: Motu Mahurangi
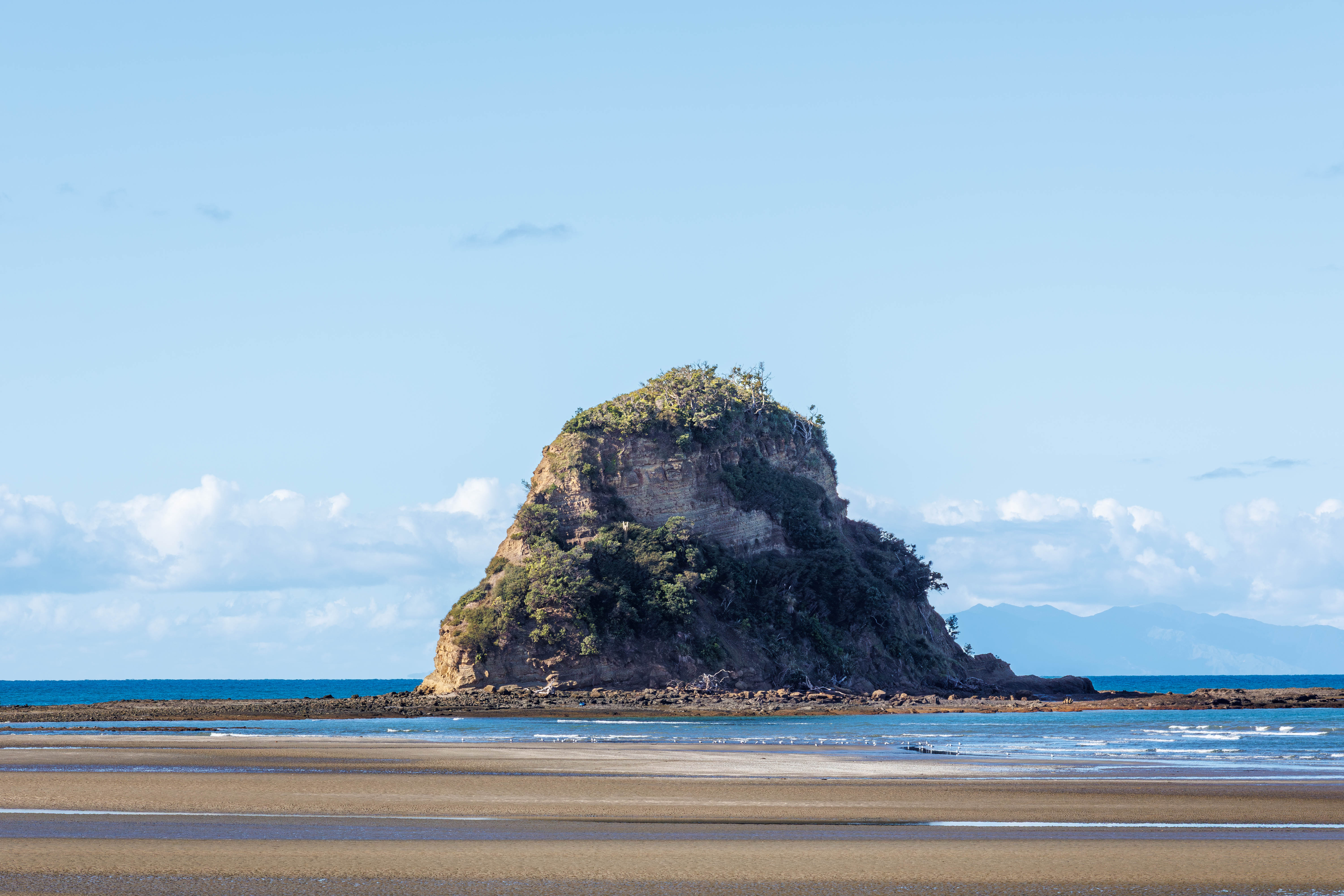
- Mahurangi Island seen from Waiwera Beach
- Interactive map of Mahurangi Island

Geography
- Location: Auckland
- Coordinates: 36°32′38″S 174°43′05″E
- Adjacent to: Hauraki Gulf
- Highest elevation: 49 m (161 ft)

Administration
- New Zealand

Mahurangi Island is an island at the mouth of the Waiwera River, in the Auckland Region, New Zealand.

== Description ==
Mahurangi Island is a 49-metre tall island located in the Hauraki Gulf at the mouth of the Waiwera River.

== History ==
The island was originally known by the name Motu Mahurangi, and is a place of importance to Ngāti Manuhiri. The island was named by the crew of the Tainui migratory canoe, after an elderly woman who lived in the homeland of the Tainui people, remaining there. Mahurangi was a revered figure, who was able to ensure that the voyage to Aotearoa was possible through her skill. Eventually, the name Mahurangi began to be applied to the wider area to the north, between Matakana and Waiwera.

Tāmaki Māori people constructed a defensive pā on the island, likely in the 1600s. Today, the island forms part of the Wenderholm Regional Park.
