= Puhoi River =

River in the Auckland Region, New Zealand

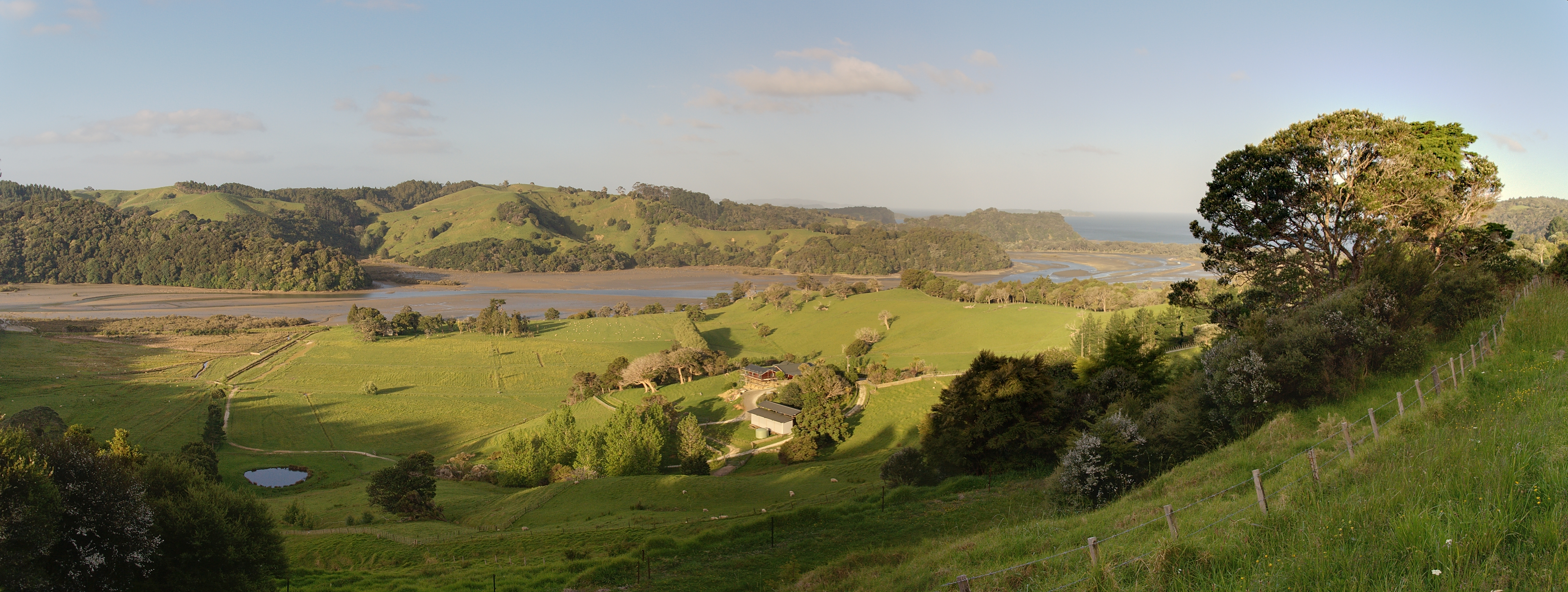
- Puhoi River near its mouth

- Mouth of the Puhoi River Puhoi River (New Zealand)
- Route of the Puhoi River

Location
- Country: New Zealand
- Region: Auckland Region

Physical characteristics
- Source: Moir Hill
  - coordinates: 36.4683°S 174.60519°E
- Mouth: Whangaparāoa Bay
  - coordinates: 36.52676°S 174.71475°E
- Length: 13 km (8 mi)

Basin features
- Progression: Puhoi River → Whangaparāoa Bay → Hauraki Gulf
- Tributaries
  - left: Hikauae Creek

The Puhoi River is a river of the Auckland Region of New Zealand's North Island. It flows southeast from its sources 10 kilometres (6 mi) southwest of Warkworth, passing through the town of Puhoi before reaching the coast of Whangaparaoa Bay seven kilometres north of Orewa.

== Geography ==
The river begins at Moir Hill, travelling south-east towards the village of Puhoi. After flowing past the village, the river becomes a tidal estuary that empties into the Hauraki Gulf.

The southern bank of the river mouth is the location of a sandbank, which forms part of the Wenderholm Regional Park. This area is a popular location for kayakers. The sandbank was traditionally known by the name Te Akeake.

== History ==
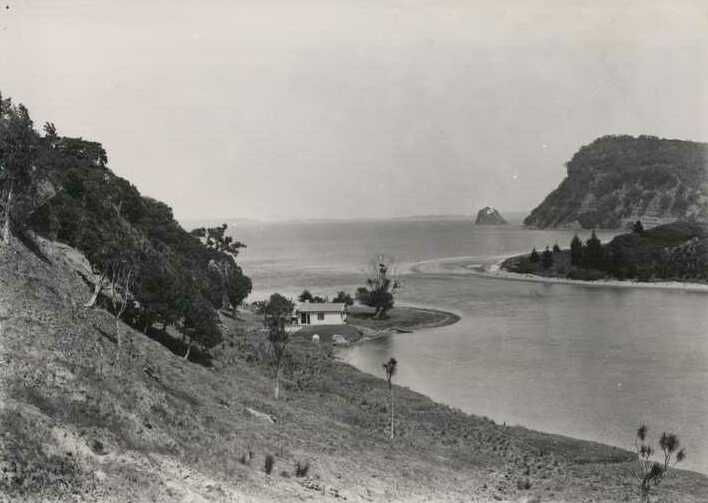
View of the mouth of the Puhoi River, circa 1900

The river is within the rohe of both Ngāti Manuhiri, who descend from Te Kawerau, and Ngāti Rongo, a hapū of Ngāti Whātua who came to the area from Hokianga. It was traditionally known as Te Awa Pūhoi, and was used as a way to access the inland ara (walking tracks) by waka. The river became the namesake for the wider area around the river mouth, known as Te Pūhoi. The northern banks of the river mouth was known as Te Oro Karaka, where a Karaka grove provided food, and a location to capture birds.

Manuhiri, the eponymous ancestor of Ngāti Manuhiri, lived beside the river with his brothers Ngāwhetū and Maeaeariki in the late 17th Century. The upper reaches of the river are remembered as a location where an unsuccessful peace-making marriage occurred, involving Te Kupe, grand-daughter of Manuhiri.

By the 1830s, Ngāti Rongo settled at Te Muri, a kāinga to the north of the Puhoi River mouth. In the mid-19th Century, the Marutūāhu tribes sold their interests in the area to the Crown in the Mahurangi Purchase, however Ngāti Rongo were not involved in this transaction. This was disputed by Te Hemara, rangatira of Ngāti Rongo, after which the Crown established the Pūhoi Reserve, a 6,691-acre area set aside for Ngāti Rongo in 1853.

By the 1860s, Ngāti Rongo shifted their main settlement from Te Muri to Te Rapa, a village on the south banks of the Puhoi River mouth. Tourists visiting the Waiwera Hot Pools were encouraged to visit the village of Te Rapa. In 1863, Bohemian migrants settled in the upper river area, founding the village of Puhoi.

== See also ==
- List of rivers of New Zealand
