= Wenderholm Regional Park =

Regional park in New Zealand

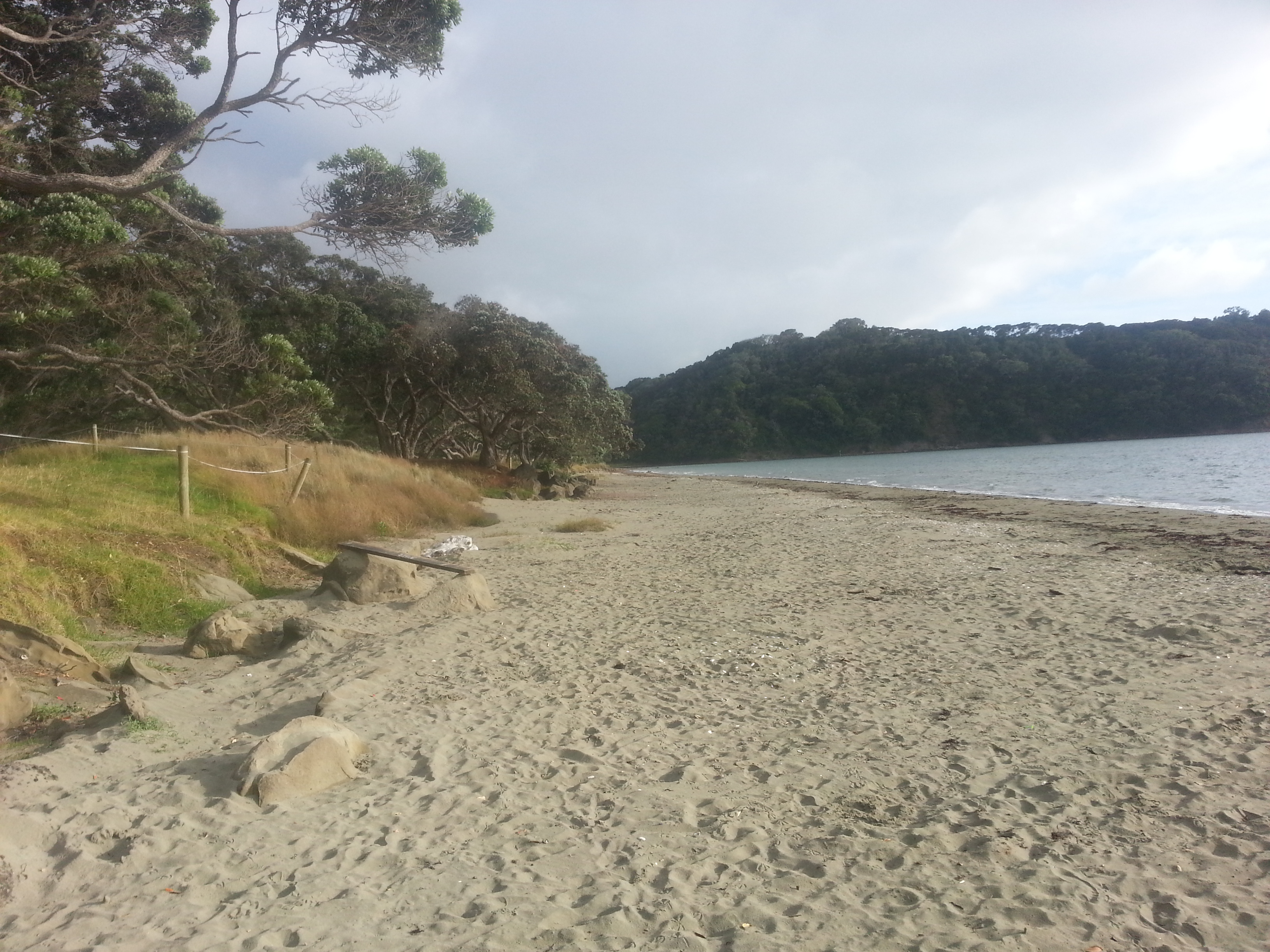
- Wenderholm beach to north

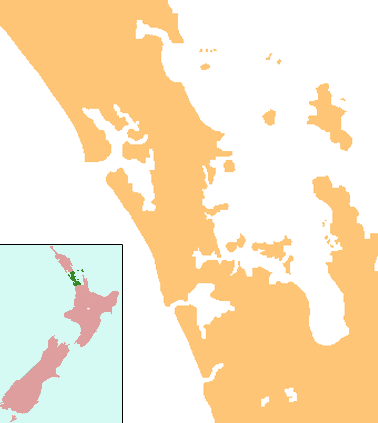
- Location within New Zealand Auckland
- Location: Wenderholm, New Zealand
- Nearest town: Waiwera
- Coordinates: 36.537°S 174.71°E
- Area: 135 hectares (330 acres)
- Established: 1965

Wenderholm Regional Park is a regional park north of Auckland, New Zealand. It is situated between the estuaries of the Puhoi River and the Waiwera River, on the east coast of the North Island and features a homestead known as Couldrey House, and a carved pouwhenua.

The park also features the 2 kilometres (1.2 mi) 'Maungatauhoro Te Hikoi' walking track, starting at the carved pouwhenua near the Couldrey House. The track offers scenic views and birdlife.

Wenderholm Regional Park was the first regional park established in the Auckland Region and is owned and managed by Auckland Council.

== Geography ==
Wenderholm Regional Park is located on a peninsula between the Puhoi River to the north and the Waiwera River to the south. There are two major sections of the park: a sandspit at the mouth of the Puhoi River, and the Maungatauhoro headland, which is covered by bush.

== Biodiversity ==
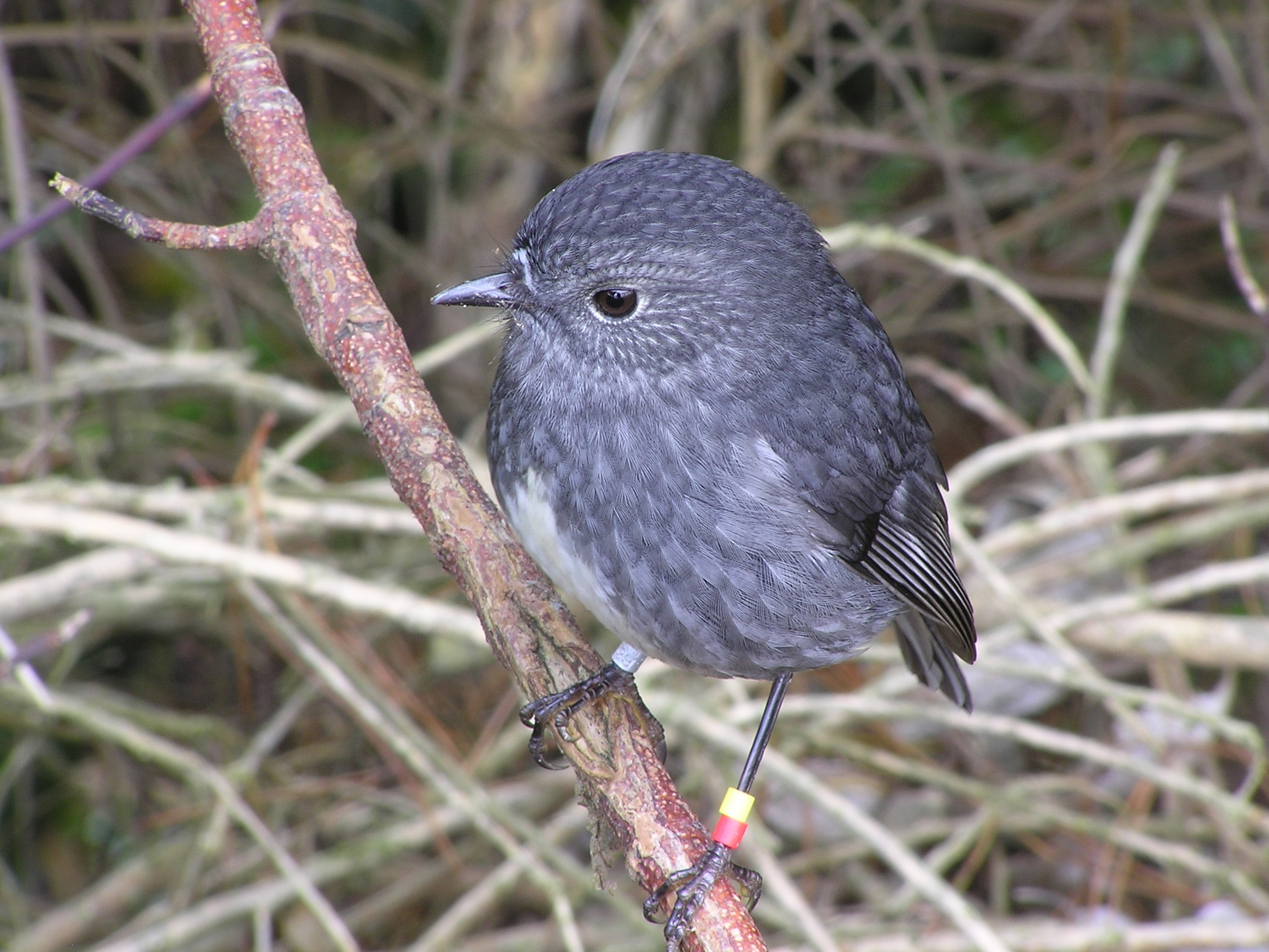
North Island robin, recently reintroduced at the park

A 60 hectares (150 acres) section of the park has been set aside since 1965 for an ecological experiment, stopping livestock from grazing and repopulating the forests. This allowed native species of birds which were no longer in the area to be re-introduced in 1999. One of the first species released into the area, Petroica australis ssp. longipes (North Island robins), has a generally high rate of survival and procreated a good number of young, unfortunately not high enough to compensate for the loss of the adult population. Tūī, kererū and New Zealand fantails are all commonly found in the park.

Whales such as southern right whales may appear to rest and calve along the coasts. Dolphins may be visible from the shores as well.

The native bush of the park prominently features pōhutukawa, with the blaze of red in the summer, on the slopes facing north is the kōwhai bush which are covered with yellow blooms in the spring, and the low-laying sandspit. The Maungatauhoro headland forest includes tree species such as tawa, kohekohe, taraire, tōtara, nīkau palms, kahikatea and rimu.

Australian kookaburras can occasionally be found in the regional park, having been introduced to Kawau Island in the 19th century.

== History ==
Māori occupation of Wenderholm lasted until the late 19th-century and archaeological evidence points to a long-history of occupation dating back to the earliest Maori settlement of the region. The area had several names but the most common was Puhoi from the Puhoi River. The flat area of Wenderholm was known as Te Akeake and the southern headland known as Maungatauhoro. A lookout over the Waiwera River was known as Mirihau. Wenderholm had ample supply of food and the two rivers provided good access to the hinterland, making it a desirable location for Maori to settle. Te Kawerau related tribes lived in the area, settling in locations such as Te Akeake, a kāinga at the mouth of the Puhoi Estuary and Kakaha Pā, a defensive outpost located at the highest point of the peninsula, Wenderholm Hill.

The Auckland politician and entrepreneur Sir Robert Graham protected many of the ancient trees in the area from felling. He went on to build a homestead in the park that he name Wenderholm (now known as Couldrey House), in the late 1850s. Many of the historic trees in the park were given as gifts to Robert Graham from George Grey. In May 1868 Graham purchased the Maungatauhoro Block from Te Hemara. The Te Akeake block was sold to a different settler in September 1873 and from September 1876 to August 1877 Graham purchased the rest of the land that is now Wenderholm from Te Hemara.

Graham planted many exotic species of plant at his home, and preserved a 19th-century grove of pōhutukawa trees in the 1880s. Graham occurred financial difficulty and in 1885 and sold Wenderholm to Robert Greenwood, who planned to subdivide the area into the Greenwood Estate. Greenwood's plan failed and the land was sold again. Graham managed to purchase the Maungatahoro block back via the Waiwera Company.

In the 1960s Herbert William Couldrey had attempted to subdivide the land at Wenderholm for lifestyle blocks. Despite being approved by the Rodney County Council the Auckland Regional Authority appealed the decision and acquired the land for £185,000 on 31 March 1965 under eminent domain. Wenderholm was opened as the first regional park of the Auckland Region following this.
