= Waiwera Hot Springs =

Thermal spring system

- Te Rata (The Doctor); Waiwera Springs; Waiwera Hot Pools
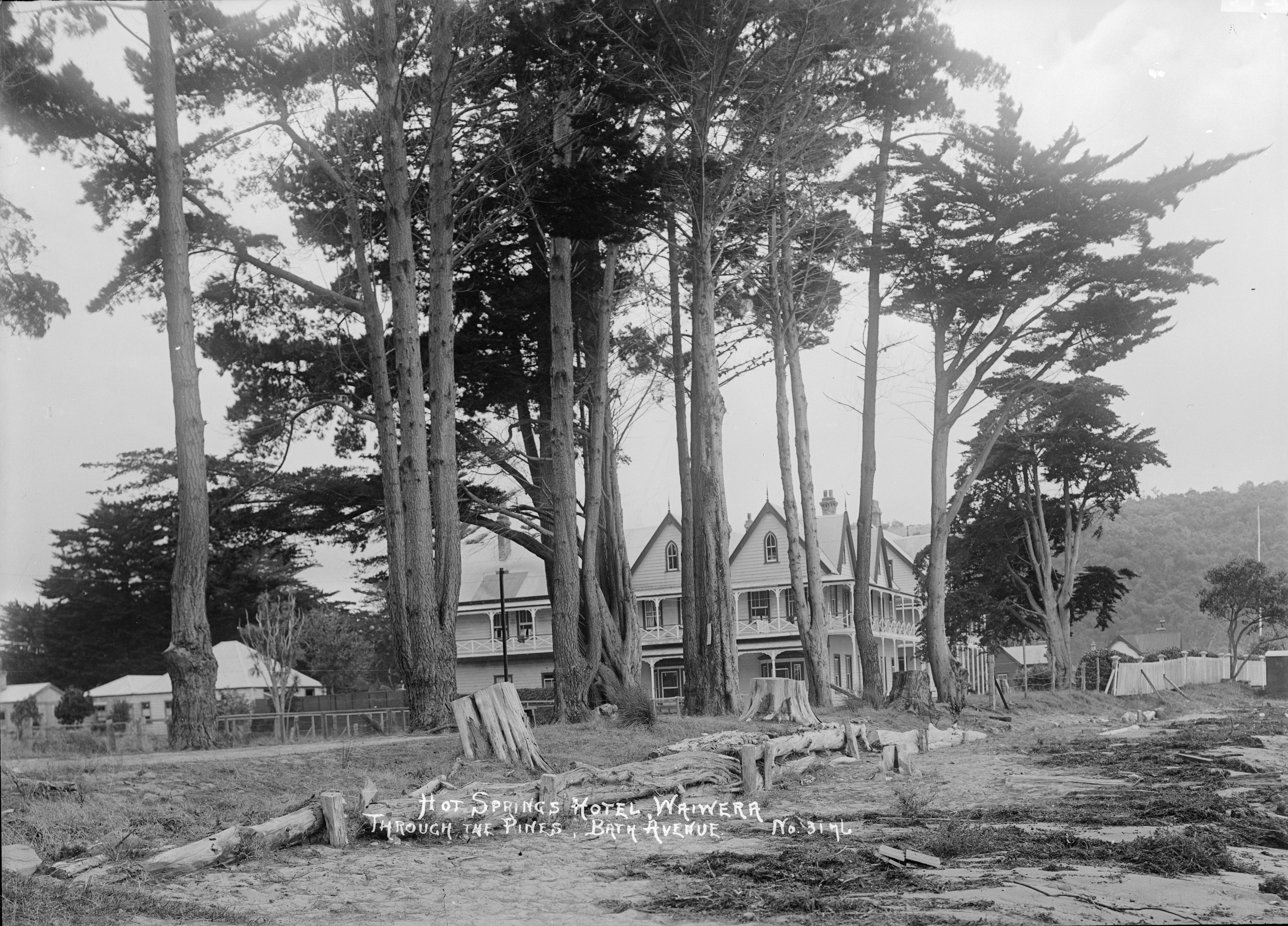
- Waiwera Hot Springs Hotel, early 1900s

- Location within New Zealand
- Location: Waiwera, New Zealand
- Coordinates: 36.5450°S 174.7060°E
- Elevation: Sea level
- Type: Geothermal
- Temperature: Fluctuating over time

Waiwera Hot Springs is a hot springs system located in the small coastal village of Waiwera, just north of Auckland, New Zealand. They were known to the Māori people for centuries before being developed. In the 1960s and 70s overproduction and overpumping of the geothermal aquifer led to significant loss of pressure and desiccation of the springs in the late 1970s. A decade later the thermal springs began to recover, although the system has not returned to the former artesian conditions.

The springs were developed into a commercial establishment, the Waiwera Hot Pools. The springs were operated as a large thermal spa and water park branded as Waiwera Infinity Thermal Spa Resort at the time of closure in 2018. The park had been New Zealand's largest water park.

== History ==
The presence of hot springs bubbling up through the sands of Waiwera Beach was known to Māori in pre-European times. The name Waiwera means 'hot water' and the Māori name for the hot springs is Te Rata (The Doctor). The indigenous people came from several places across the Island to soak in the hot springs in large dug-out holes in the beach sand; the hot spring water would percolate up from the bottom of the sandy holes.

Records indicate that the Ngāti Rangi tribe originally "owned" the area, and that the entire bay was "protected by four fortified pahs; on the North by the Kakaha pah, 300 feet high; on the South by the Whau pah, 230 feet high; on the East by the Mahurangi, 140 feet high; and on the West by the Pitawai, 320 feet high".

In 1844 or 1845, Scottish-born entrepreneur Robert Graham purchased the 40 acre property from Ngāti Rongo for £16, clothes, blankets, tobacco and weapons. Negotiations for the deal took two years, and in 1846 Graham began planting grape vines, strawberries and apple, cherry, guava, peach, and pear fruit trees. Cows grazed in the pasture land and provided milk. During these early times, Māori continued to use the area abundantly, and as many as 3,000 people per day could be seen at the beach where the hot springs bubbled up from the ground.

Commercialisation and development commenced in 1875 when Graham built bathing facilities at the beach and a hotel nearby. It had originally been promoted to the public by advertising the thermal waters' alleged rehabilitative properties: “To the sick and debilitated… follow Shakespeare’s advice, throw physics to the dogs and visit Waiwera hot springs… for healing virtues of painful diseases, sores, stiff joints, paralysis and more restored to perfect health”. There were claims that the hot spring water cured rheumatism, paralysis, neuralgia, sciatica, gout, and skin diseases. The resort became one of the most popular attractions in the Auckland Region during the 1870s, when a regular steam boat service brought tourists from central Auckland to the resort.

In 1875 the property had been developed into a hotel with adjacent primitive soaking pools (produced by holes dug into the sand that were lined with sheets of tin), as well as cottages for visitors. The natural springs ceased flowing in the 1870s, when Graham created multiple bore holes into the earth and began bottling and selling Waiwera mineral water.

In July 1879 a water analysis was performed on the main spring. It found the following minerals (in grams per gallon of water): sodium chloride 123.82; calcium chloride 7.10; magnesium chloride 1.36; calcium carbonate 1.60; magnesium carbonate 22; iron carbonate 43; phosphates and silica 1.61; with the total saline matter being 136.14 grams per gallon.

The hotel, hot springs, and 40 acres were purchased by Wenzel Schollum in 1913, and in 1927 the property was described as a "beautiful place of retreat in nature". The hotel and surrounding land was destroyed in a fire in 1939. The fire was determined to have been deliberately set, by Schollum and his business investor Donal Edmund Connel, with the intention of an insurance payout.

=== Development, over-development and closure ===
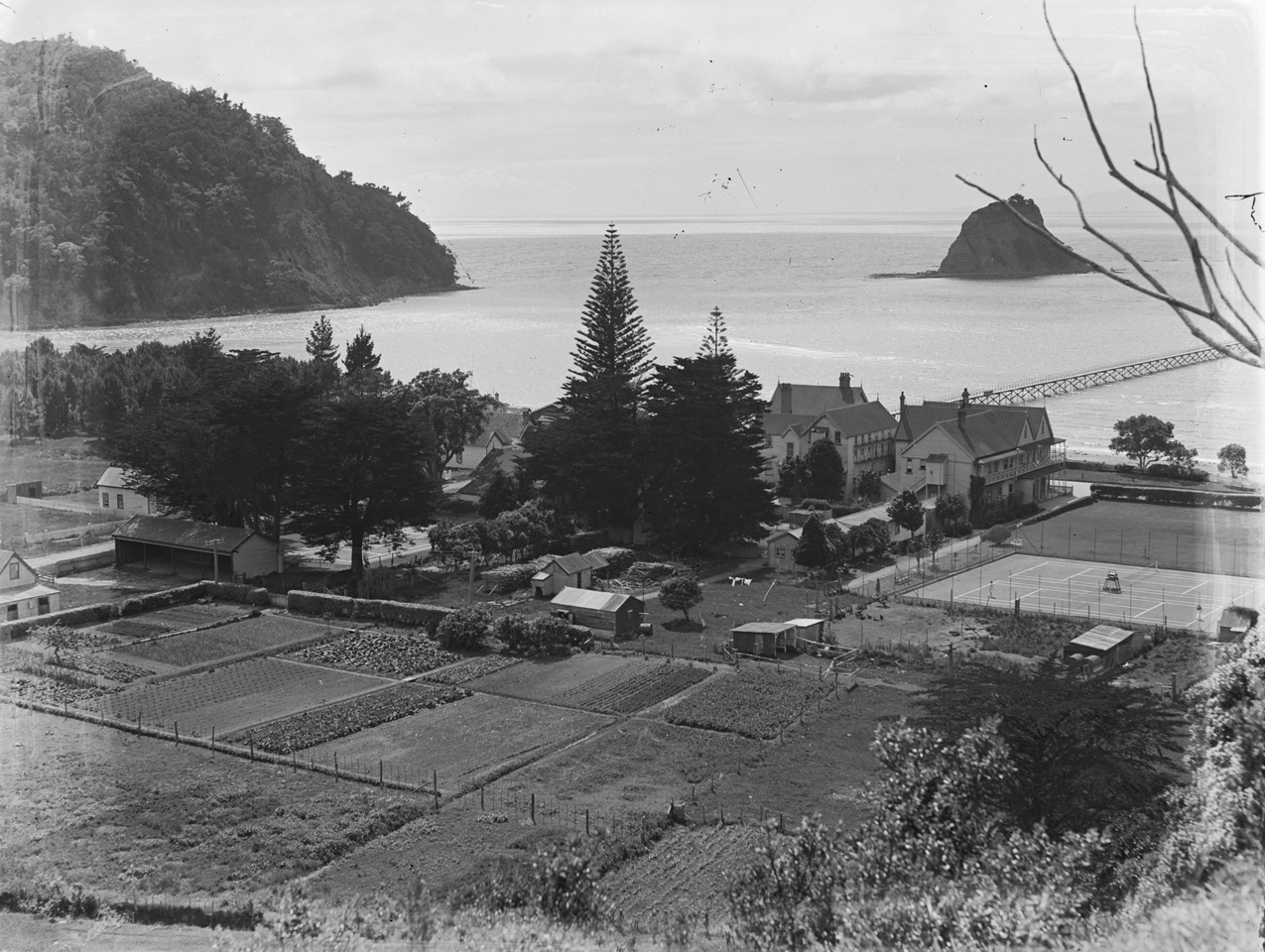
Waiwera Hot Springs showing hotel and fields, 1940s

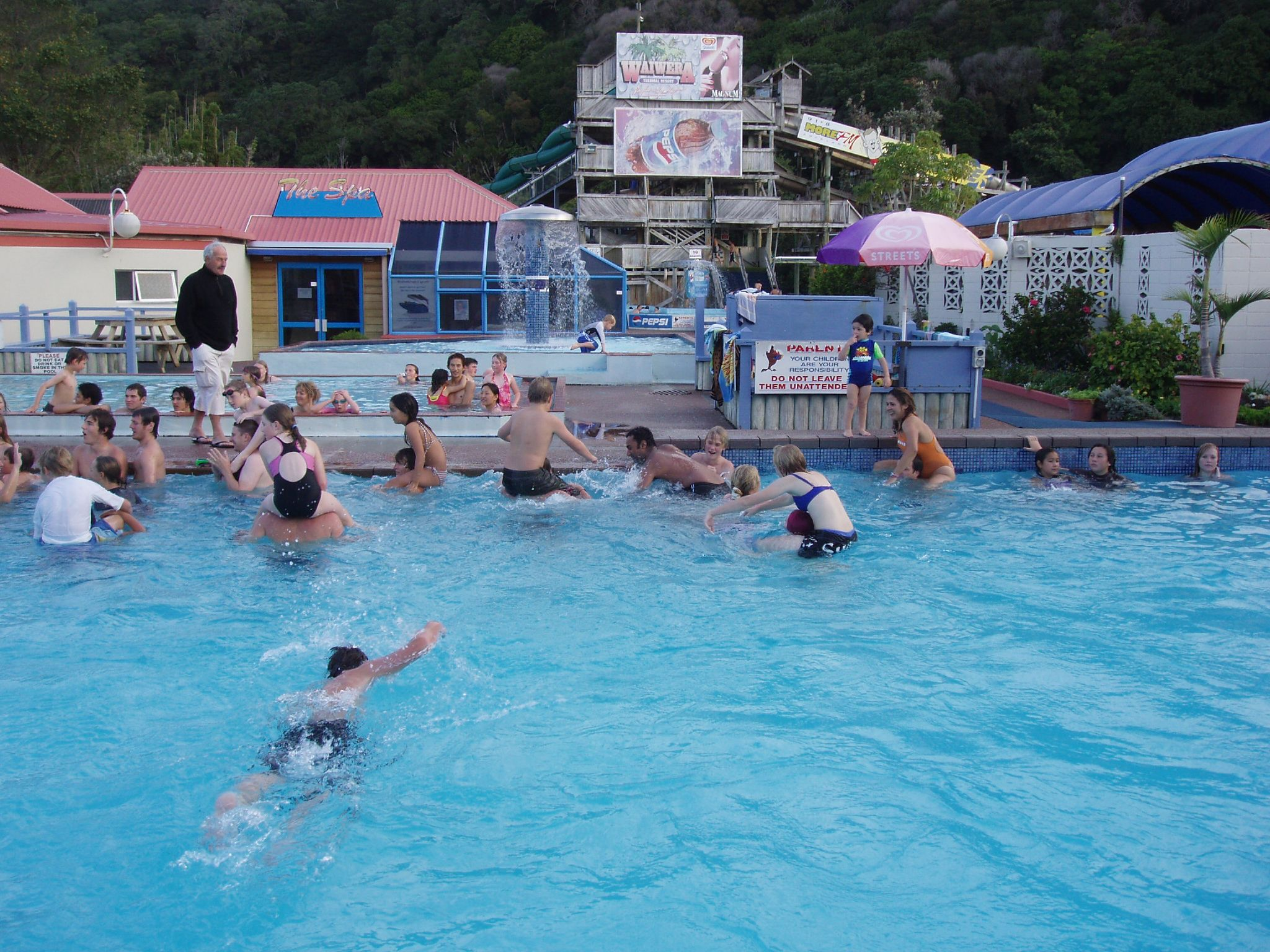
Waiwera Hot Springs in 2006

In the 20th century, the resort was redeveloped into a modern water park which proved to be unsustainable.

Redevelopment began in the 1950s, and in 1957, the hotel and pools were reopened. By the late 1950s and 1960s, the site showed signs of overdevelopment, including additional pools and facilities for "luxury" services. In 1969 the water resources had been over-extracted to the point that they ceased to flow.

Yet, the overproduction pumping from the underground reservoir continued, more development continued and the site was transformed into a "thrilling water park" which included activities and features such as hydroslides Speed slide, Twister and The Black Hole. Other features included 25 pools, a water bottling plant, the Kids Chute, Lazy River, movie pool showing 3 movies a day; Aquacise fitness classes and swimming school.

Throughout the 1960s and 1970s there was "significant pressure reduction" in the reservoir that resulted in "the loss of artesian conditions and led to the desiccation of the hot springs in close succession." In time the artesian hydrodynamic activity was partially restored as observed by local people in the 2010s, however as of 2020, no activity was observed in the hot spring system itself.

In 2008, the property was purchased by Mikhail Khimich, a Russian billionaire, who leased the property to further develop the water bottling plant. The water park and resort were underfunded and neglected by Khimich, and were described as "filthy dirty...absolutely terrible". Once again, in 2017, plans were drawn up for renovations, but never implemented.

In February 2018, the park was closed to visitors and fell into a state of disrepair. The commercial establishment, a large thermal spa and water park, was branded as Waiwera Infinity Thermal Spa Resort at the time of closure in 2018. The park had been New Zealand's largest water park. The complex claimed 350,000 visitors per year and consisted of 26 pools plus various slides. The New Zealand Herald reported that the site had fallen "into a sorry state described by locals as a “bloody mess”", and the temperature of the thermal water had dropped. In 2019 Khimich fled the country one million dollars in debt, but was ordered to return in order to pay back his debts from Waiwera.

In a scientific thermal study report, it was concluded that the highest observed water temperature outflow was not coming from the hot springs themselves but rather from the wastewater outflow drainage outlet. It was also suggested that the second warmest outflow source might be of natural origin or it may also be caused by leakage from a formerly capped borehole.

Demolition of the pool complex took place from August to November 2023 in preparation for sale of the site.

=== Reopening ===
In November 2025, plans were announced for reopening the resort. A company called Waiwera Thermal Springs bought the site from its current owners Urban Partners. They planned to redevelop the site as a series of "outdoor rooms" with 28 pools, saunas, reflexology areas, gardens, pavilions and a café in a tranquil site landscaped with 77,000 native plants. Urban Partners still owns land containing a hotel and campground next to the hot springs site.
