= Waiwera =

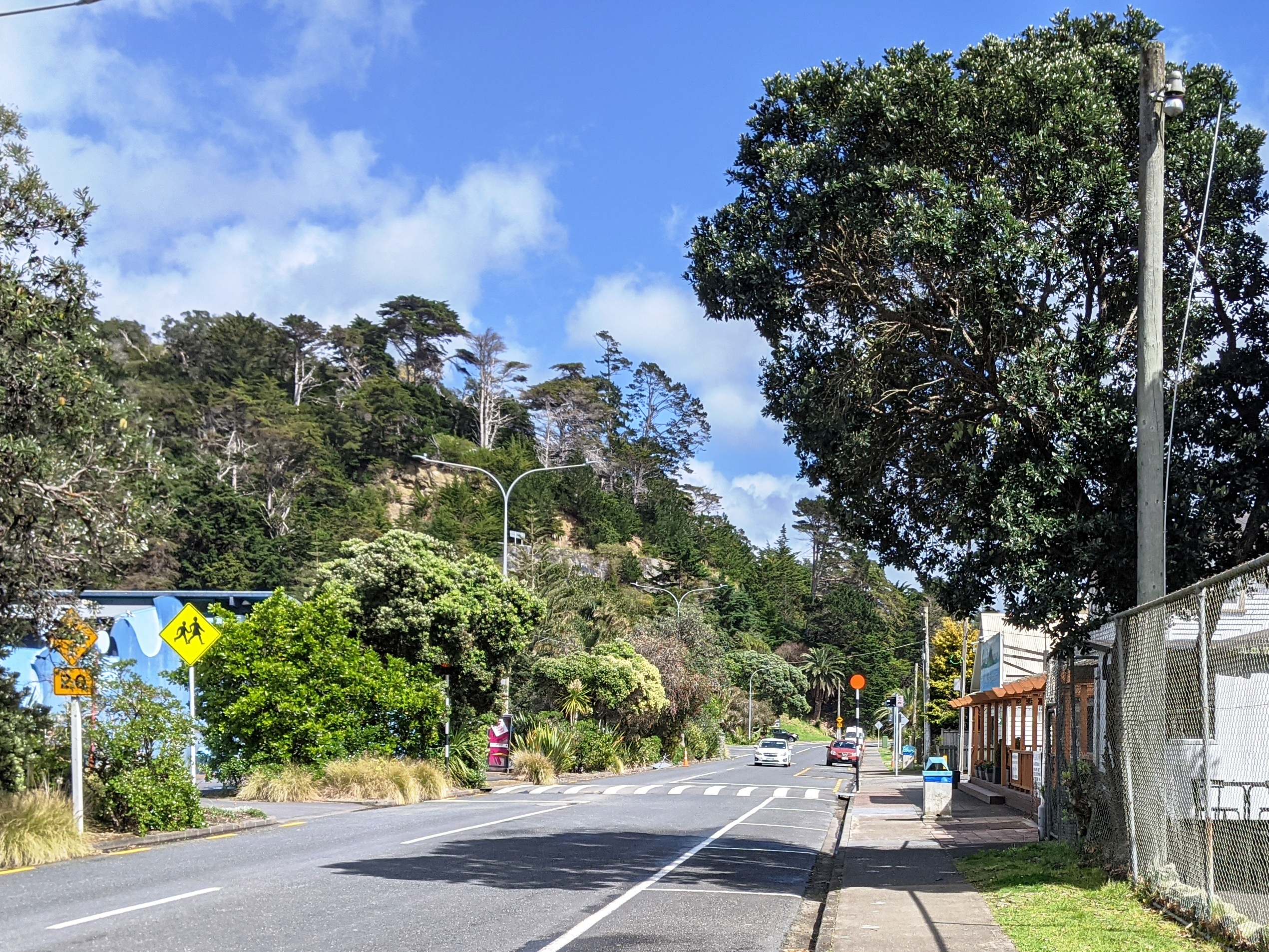
- Waiwera Road
- Interactive map of Waiwera
- Coordinates: 36°32′41″S 174°42′25″E
- Country: New Zealand
- Region: Auckland Region
- Ward: Albany ward
- Local Board: Hibiscus and Bays Local Board
- Electorates: Whangaparāoa; Te Tai Tokerau

Government
  - Territorial Authority: Auckland Council
  - Mayor of Auckland: Wayne Brown
  - Whangaparāoa MP: Mark Mitchell
  - Te Tai Tokerau MP: Mariameno Kapa-Kingi

Area
  - Total: 0.55 km^{2} (0.21 sq mi)

Population (June 2025)
  - Total: 240
  - Density: 440/km^{2} (1,100/sq mi)

Waiwera is a small town in the north of the Auckland Region in New Zealand. Waiwera is 6 km north of Orewa, 6 km south-east of Puhoi, 23 km south-east of Warkworth and approximately 35 km from the Auckland City centre. The settlement lies at the outlet of a river also called Waiwera. Less than 1 kilometre north of the Waiwera turn-off lies the turn-off to Wenderholm Regional Park which is situated on the far side of the headland to the north of the Waiwera River outlet.

== History ==
The name is of Māori origin and means "Hot Water" (Wai = Water and Wera = Hot), and is a shortened version of the traditional name Waiwerawera.

Its main claim to fame was the hot water springs which were well known in pre-European times and reputedly visited by Māori from as far away as Thames. The first European settler to promote the springs was Robert Graham who established a health resort in 1848. This resort was destroyed by fire in 1939. During the late 19th century there was a regular steam ferry service from Auckland. The bath house was torn down in 1951. The commercial hot pools closed in 2018.

== Demographics ==
Statistics New Zealand describes Waiwera as a rural settlement, which covers 0.55 km^{2} (0.21 sq mi) and had an estimated population of 240 as of June 2025, with a population density of 436 people per km^{2}. Waiwera is part of the larger Wainui-Waiwera statistical area.

Historical population
Year	Pop.	±% p.a.
2006	192	—
2013	237	+3.05%
2018	240	+0.25%
2023	252	+0.98%

Waiwera had a population of 252 in the 2023 New Zealand census, an increase of 12 people (5.0%) since the 2018 census, and an increase of 15 people (6.3%) since the 2013 census. There were 117 males and 132 females in 141 dwellings. 1.2% of people identified as LGBTIQ+. The median age was 58.8 years (compared with 38.1 years nationally). There were 15 people (6.0%) aged under 15 years, 21 (8.3%) aged 15 to 29, 126 (50.0%) aged 30 to 64, and 90 (35.7%) aged 65 or older.

People could identify as more than one ethnicity. The results were 83.3% European (Pākehā); 13.1% Māori; 2.4% Pasifika; 7.1% Asian; and 1.2% Middle Eastern, Latin American and African New Zealanders (MELAA). English was spoken by 98.8%, Māori language by 4.8%, and other languages by 14.3%. No language could be spoken by 1.2% (e.g. too young to talk). New Zealand Sign Language was known by 1.2%. The percentage of people born overseas was 25.0, compared with 28.8% nationally.

Religious affiliations were 41.7% Christian, 1.2% Hindu, 1.2% Māori religious beliefs, 2.4% Buddhist, 2.4% New Age, 1.2% Jewish, and 1.2% other religions. People who answered that they had no religion were 42.9%, and 6.0% of people did not answer the census question.

Of those at least 15 years old, 48 (20.3%) people had a bachelor's or higher degree, 123 (51.9%) had a post-high school certificate or diploma, and 60 (25.3%) people exclusively held high school qualifications. The median income was $35,900, compared with $41,500 nationally. 21 people (8.9%) earned over $100,000 compared to 12.1% nationally. The employment status of those at least 15 was that 102 (43.0%) people were employed full-time, 27 (11.4%) were part-time, and 3 (1.3%) were unemployed.

== Gallery ==
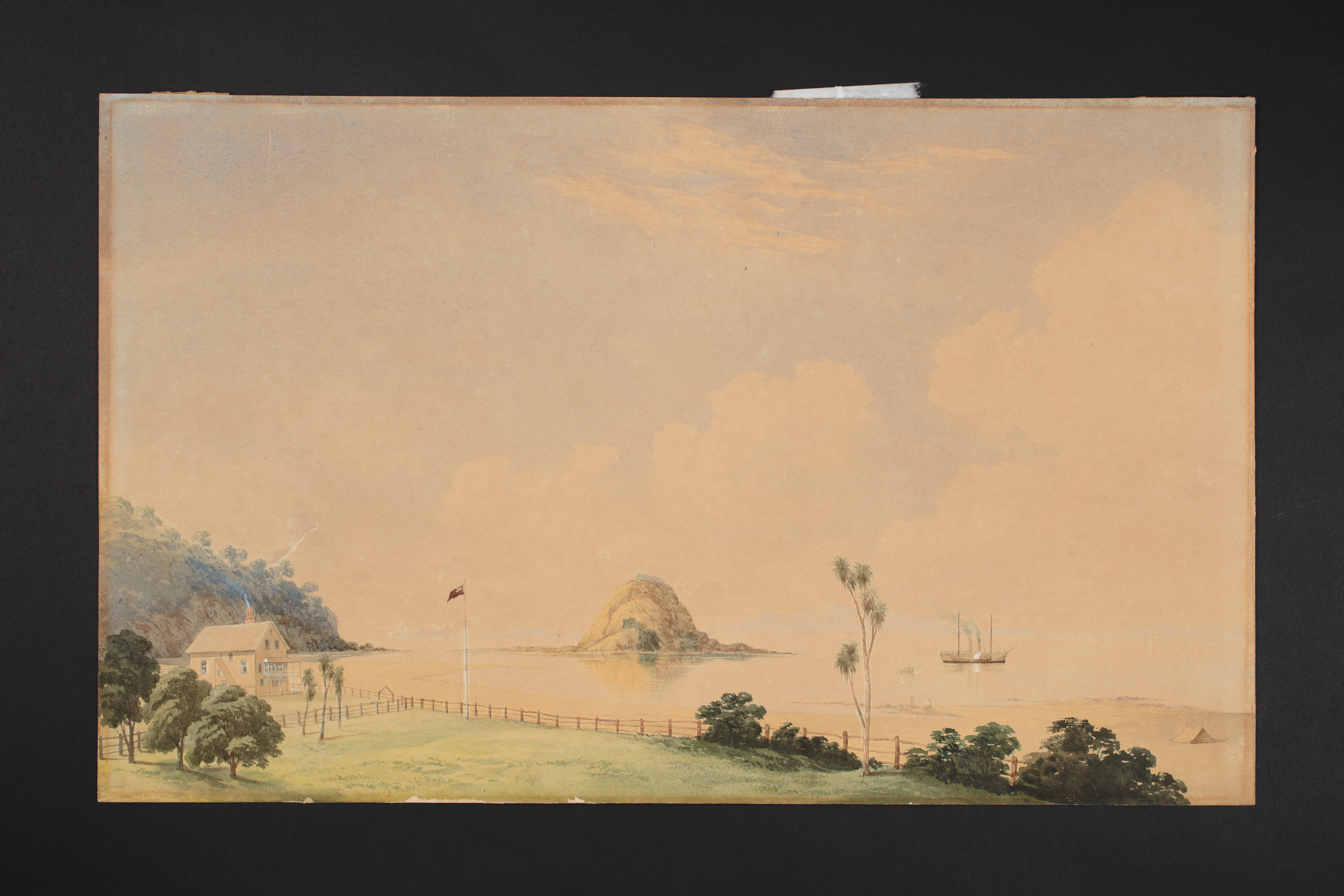
Watercolour of Waiwera c. 1860s drawn by John Hoyte

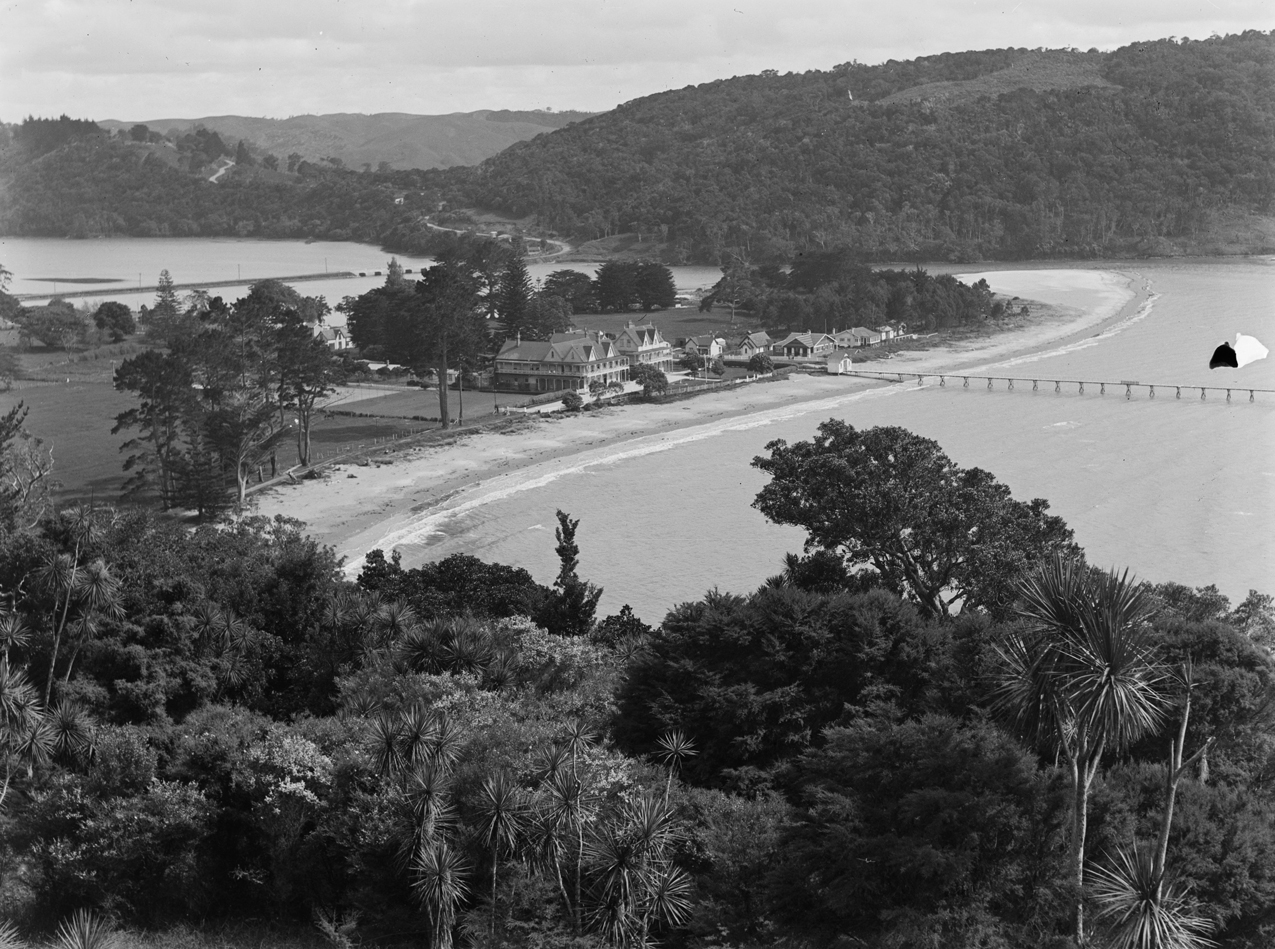
Waiwera in the 1940s

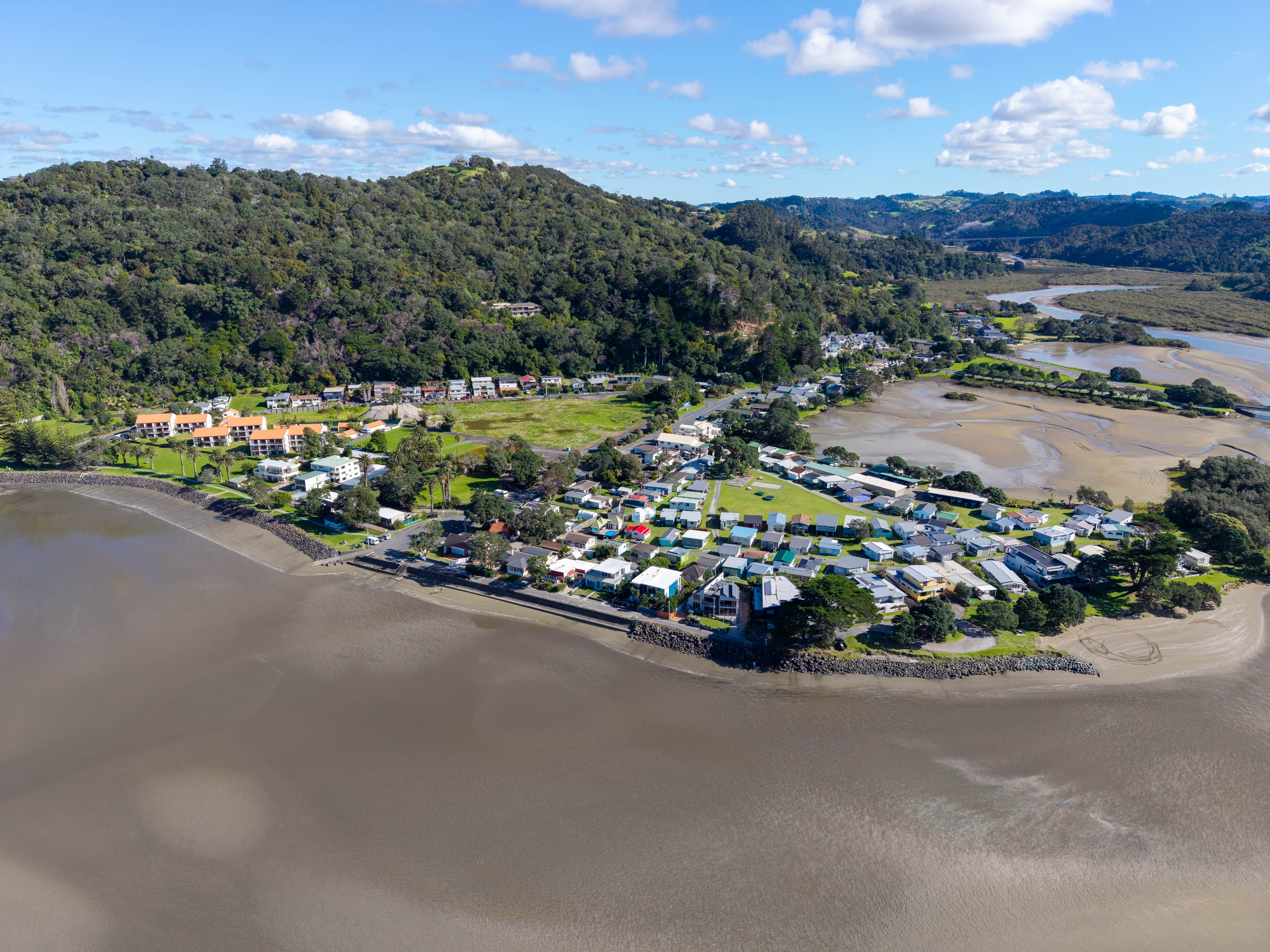
Waiwera from the east

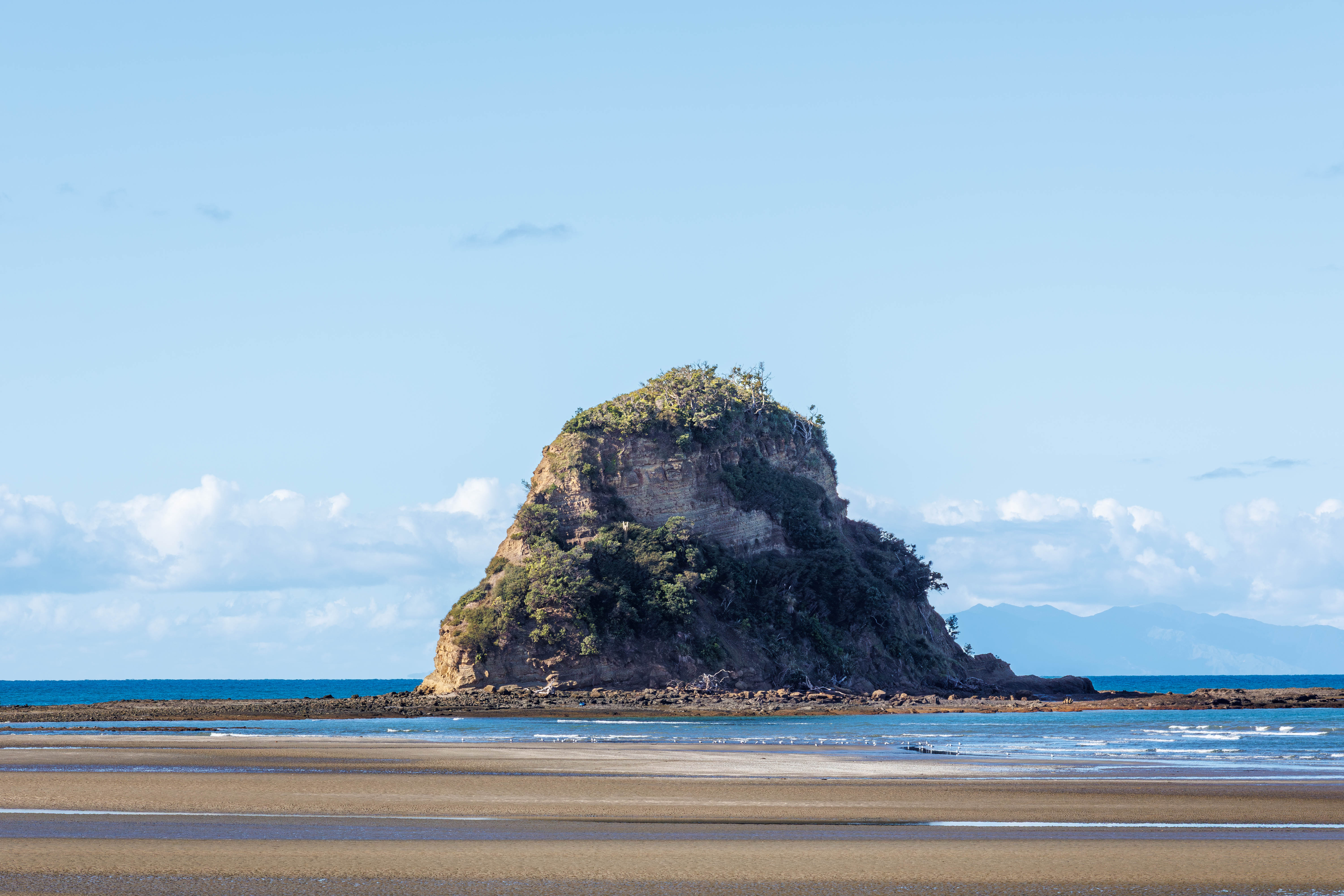
Mahurangi Island and Waiwera Beach

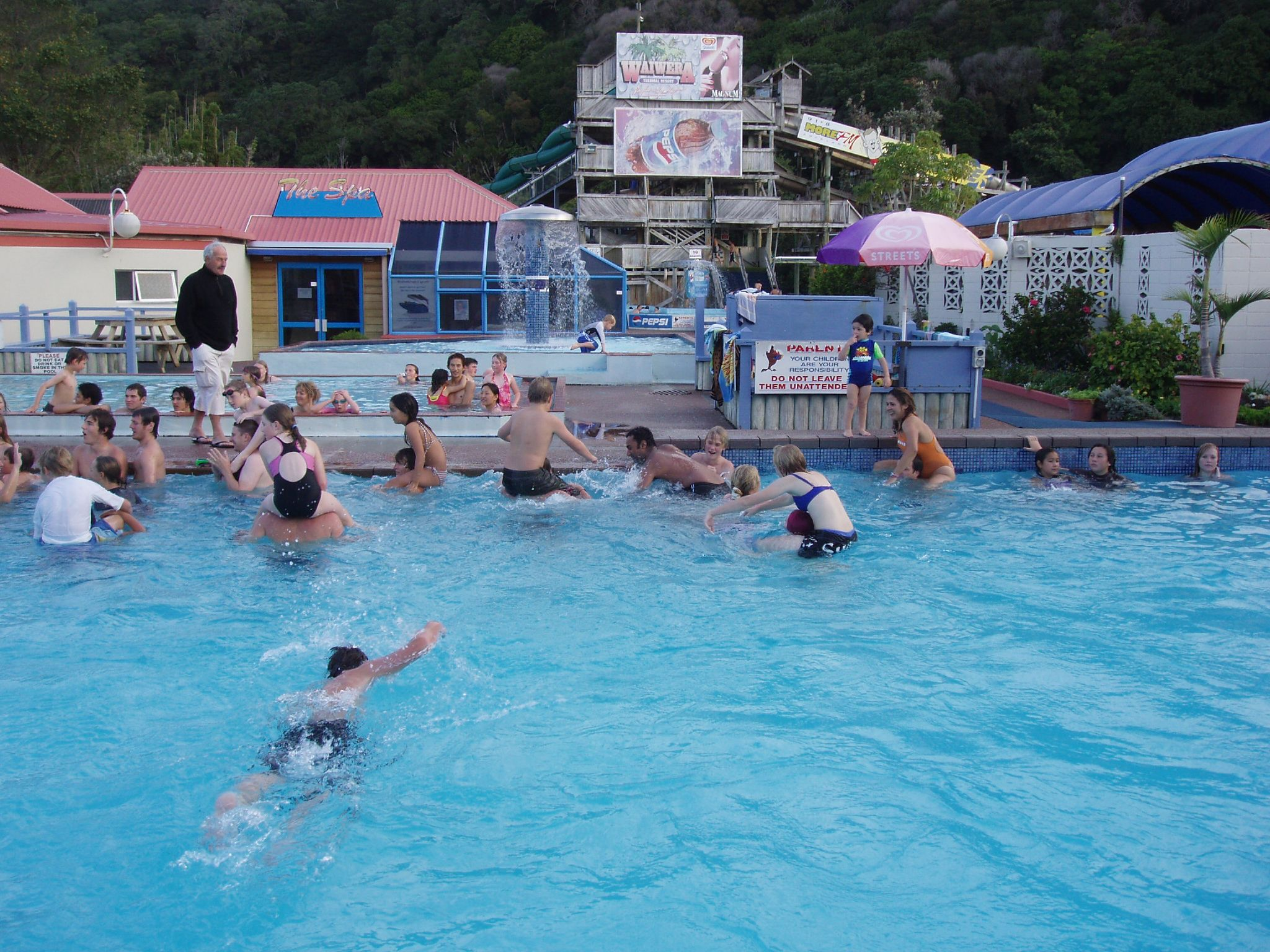
Waiwera Hot Pools in 2006
