= Hibiscus Coast =

Stretch of the Hauraki Gulf

- Suburban area
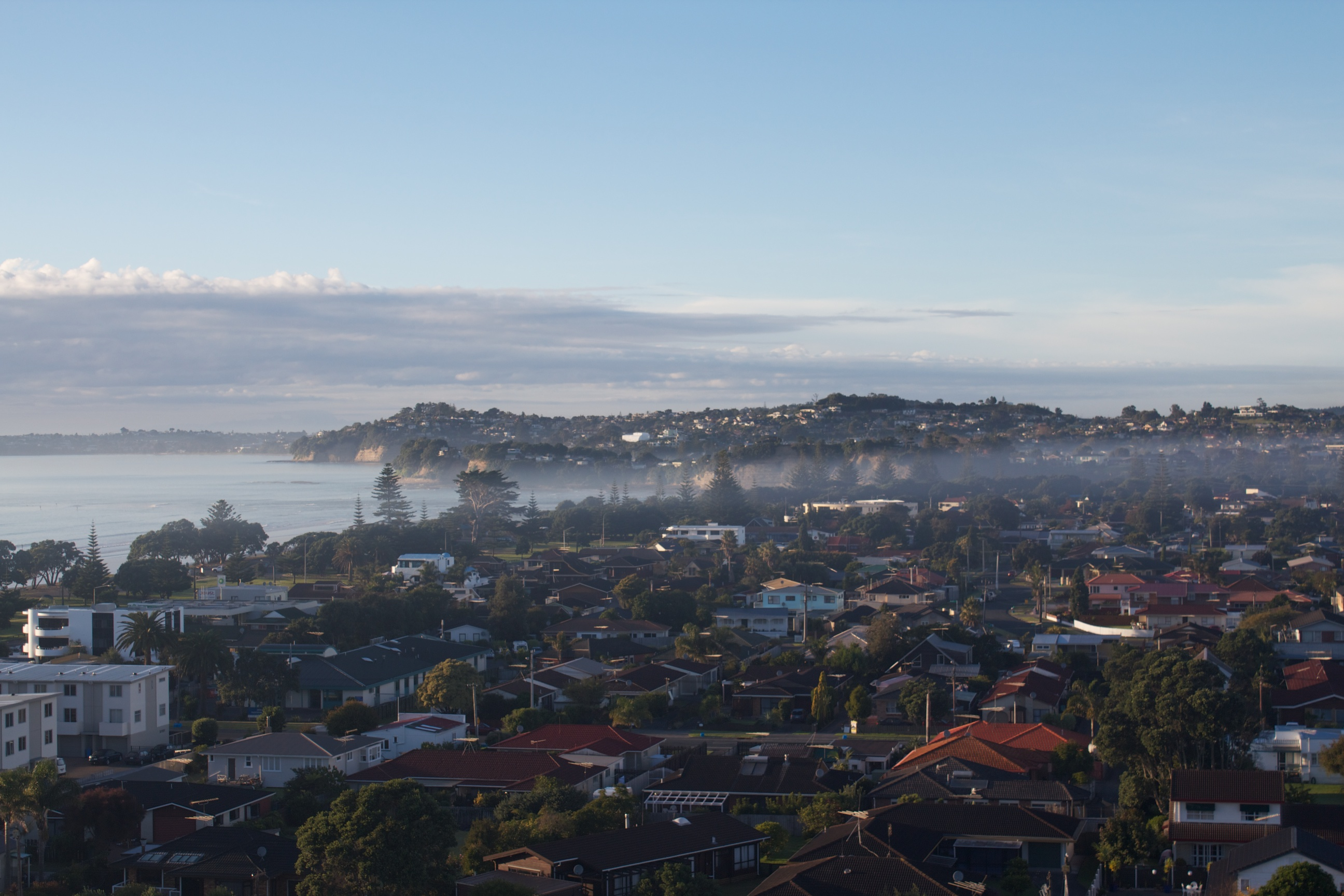
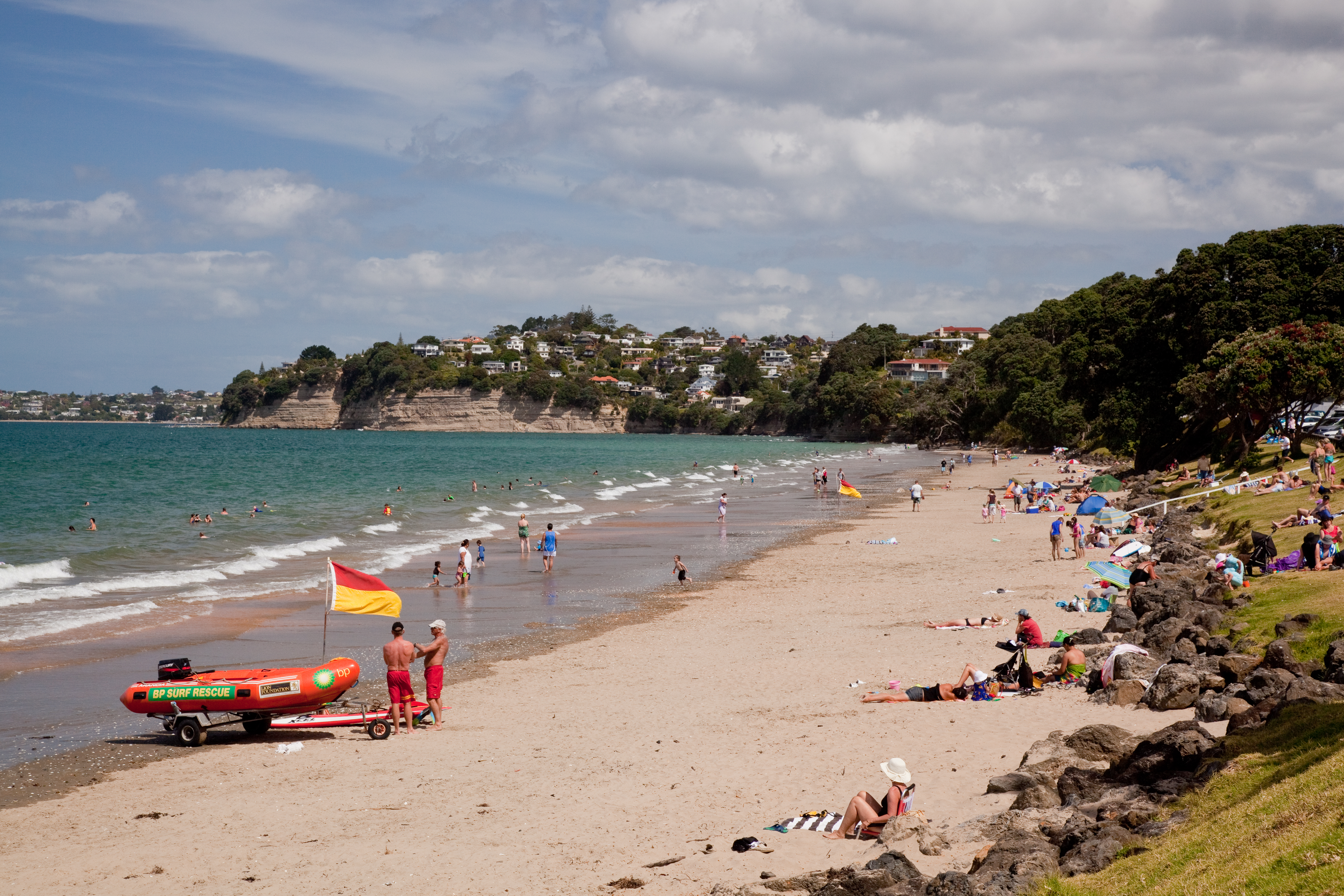
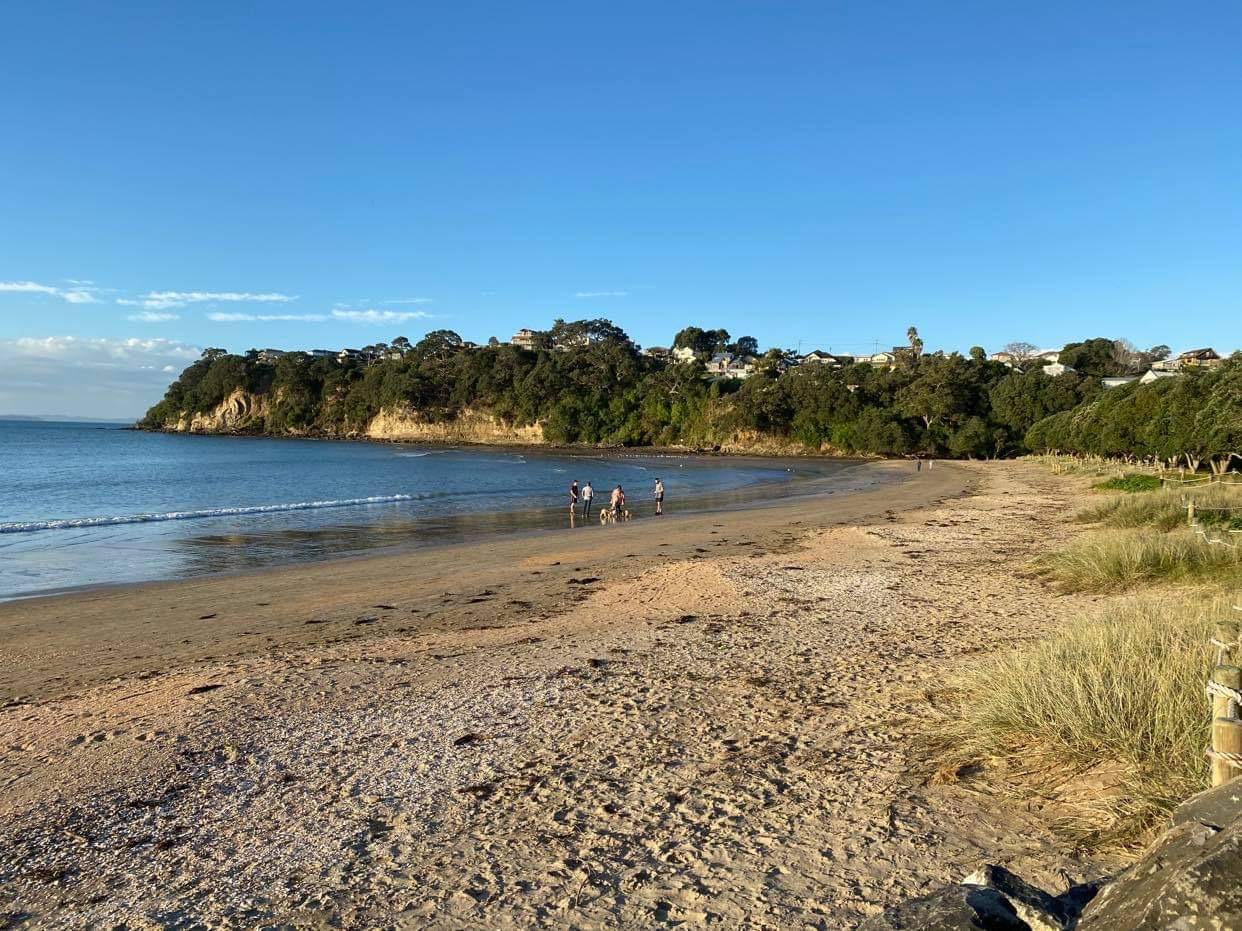
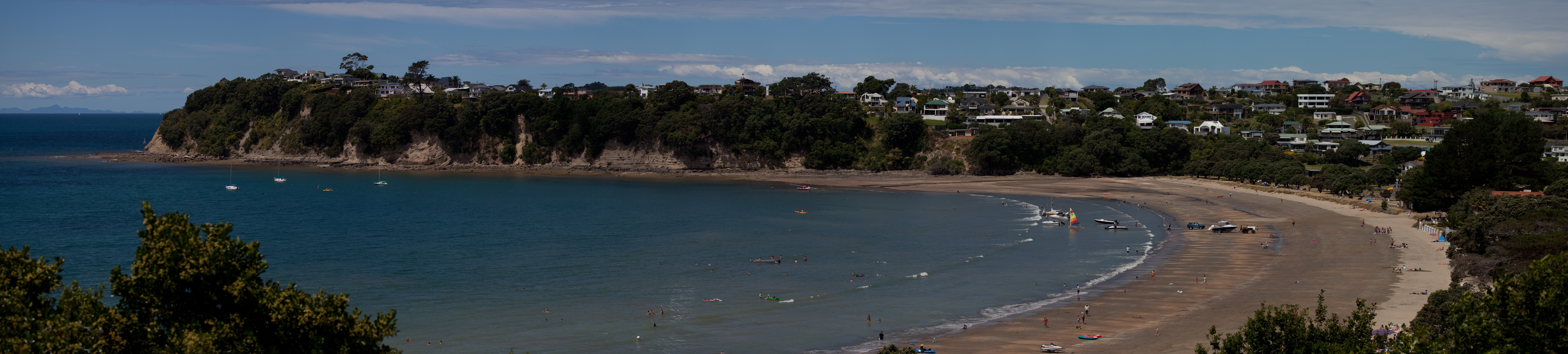
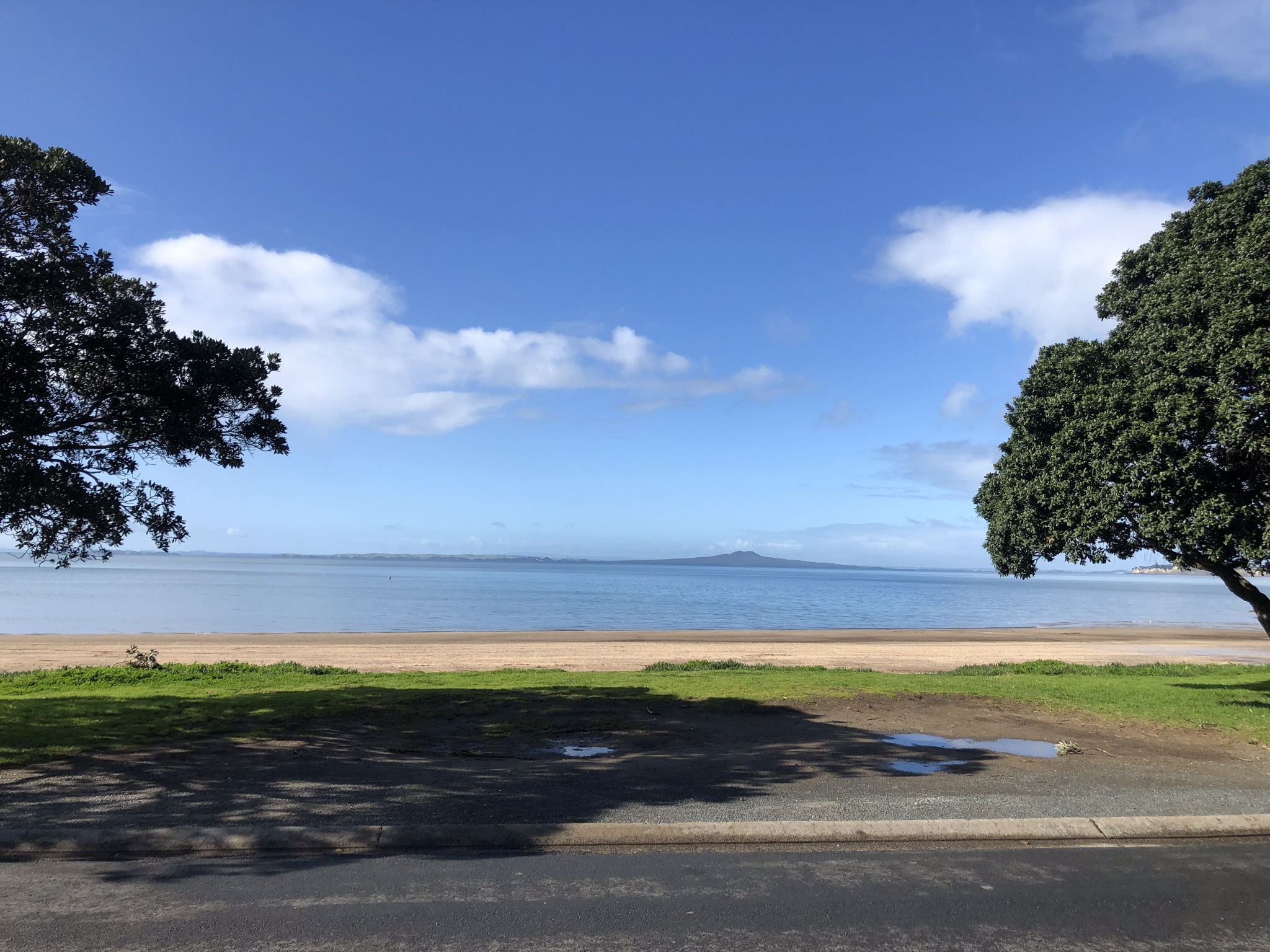
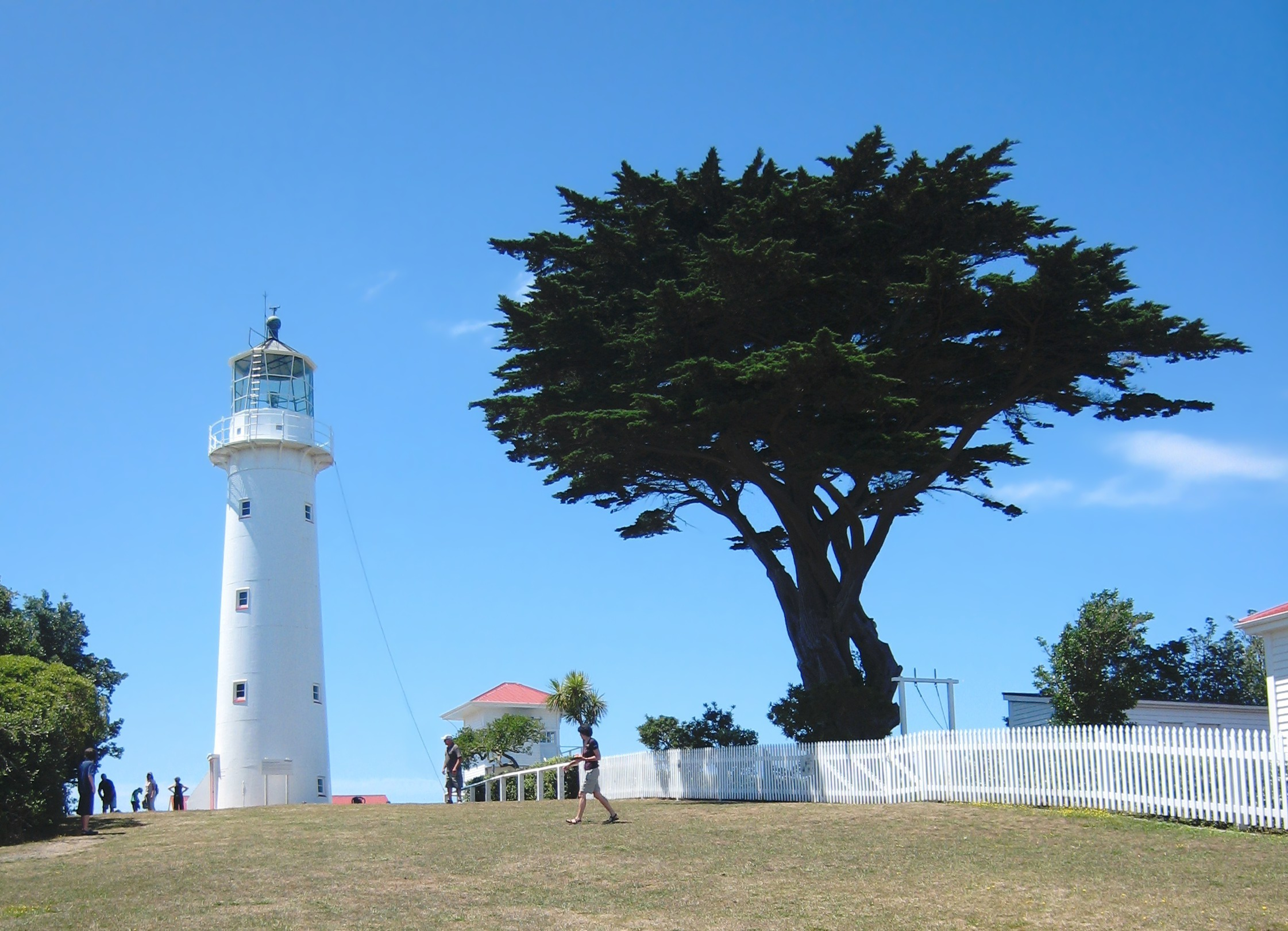
- From top, left to right: Orewa, Red Beach, Stanmore Bay, Big Manly, Arkles Bay, Tiritiri Matangi

- Location in the Auckland Region
- Coordinates: 36.6058°S 174.6978°E
- Country: New Zealand
- Island: North Island
- Region: Auckland
- Electoral ward: Albany Ward
- Local board: Hibiscus and Bays
- Electorate: Whangaparāoa; Te Tai Tokerau

Government
  - Territorial Authority: Auckland Council
  - Mayor of Auckland: Wayne Brown
  - Whangaparāoa MP: Mark Mitchell
  - Te Tai Tokerau MP: TBD

Area
  - Total: 49.38 km^{2} (19.07 sq mi)

Population
  - Estimate (June 2025): 68,980
- Time zone: UTC+12 (NZST)
  - Summer (DST): UTC+13 (NZDT)

The Hibiscus Coast is a populated area on a stretch of the Hauraki Gulf coast in New Zealand's Auckland Region. It has a population of 68,980 (June 2025), making it the 10th most populous urban area in New Zealand, and the second most populous in the Auckland Region, behind Auckland itself. As an urban area delineated by Statistics New Zealand, the Hibiscus Coast consists of Hatfields Beach, Orewa, Silverdale and Whangaparāoa Peninsula. The Auckland Council's Hibiscus Coast subdivision of the Hibiscus and Bays includes the neighbouring communities of Waiwera and Stillwater, and Milldale in Rodney, is also described as a part of the Hibiscus Coast.

Tāmaki Māori settled the Hibiscus Coast area from at least the 13th century, utilising the resources of the Weiti River, Ōrewa River and Whangaparāoa Bay, where an important shark fishery was located. After the Kawerau warrior Maki unified many of the Tāmaki Māori people of the northern and western Auckland Region, his children and grandchildren established hapū including Ngāti Kahu, Ngāti Maraeariki and Ngāti Manuhiri. Ngāti Kahu and Ngāti Pāoa from the Hauraki Gulf fought for control over the Whangaparāoa Bay shark fishery in the 18th century. After fleeing the area in the 1820s due to the Musket Wars, Ngāti Kahu returned to the Hibiscus Coast, living here until the 1870s.

The Hibiscus Coast was a part of the Mahurangi Block, forest sold to the Crown in 1841. Kauri loggers and itinerant kauri gum diggers were among the first Europeans to come to the area. The township of Silverdale, then known as The Wade, was established as a logging town along the Weiti River, and the Waiwera Hot Pools became a popular tourist attraction in the latter 19th century.

Orewa and the Whangaparāoa Peninsula became popular tourist destinations in the 1920s, when holiday baches were constructed in the area. During World War II, a New Zealand Army base was constructed at the end of the peninsula. The area rapidly developed in the 1950s and 1960s, in part due to the opening of the Auckland Harbour Bridge, and town centres were constructed in Orewa and Whangaparāoa. The 1960s saw the opening of two regional parks, Wenderholm Regional Park, adjacent to the Hibiscus Cost, and Shakespear Regional Park, at the eastern headland of the Whangaparāoa Peninsula.

The Hibiscus Coast was connected to the Auckland Northern Motorway in the late 1990s, after which further residential development occurred on the coast, most notably at Silverdale. In 2023, construction began on O Mahurangi Penlink, a new motorway to Whangaparāoa, crossing the Weiti River.

== Geography ==
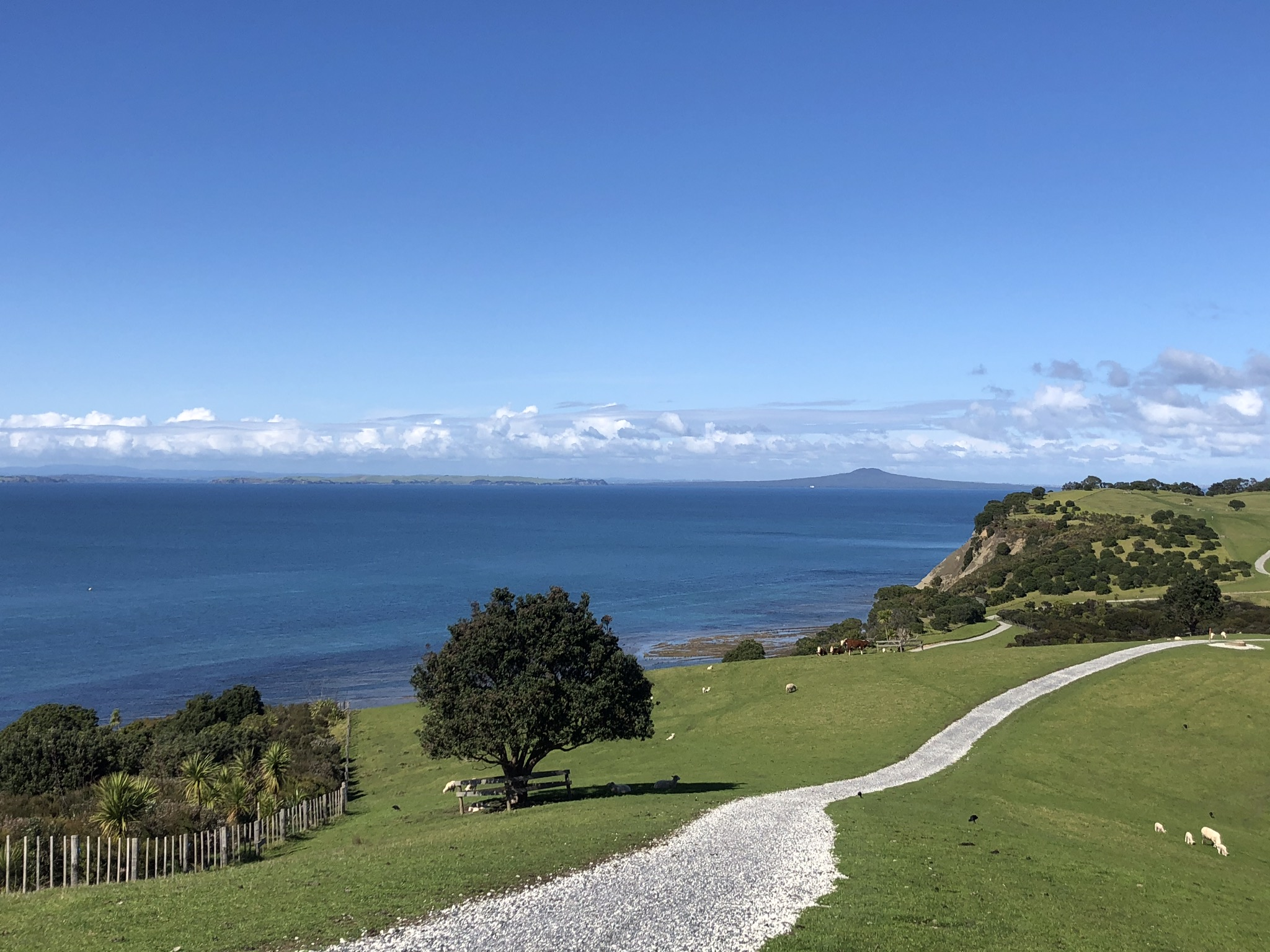
Shakespear Regional Park

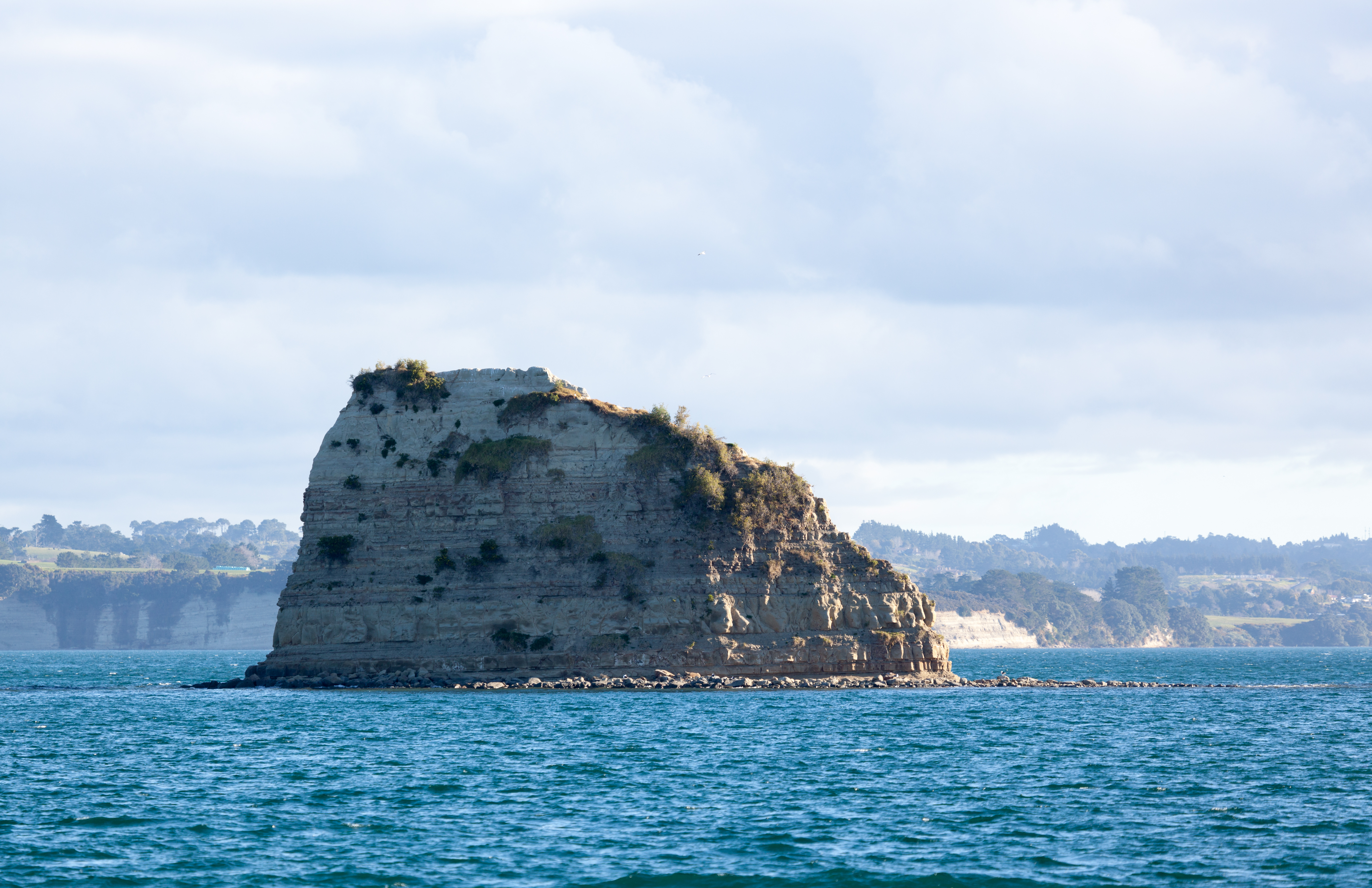
Kotanui Island / Frenchmans Cap

The Hibiscus Coast is an area of the northern Auckland Region, located between the Waiwera River to the north and the Ōkura River to the south, adjacent to the Hauraki Gulf. The area includes the Whangaparāoa Peninsula and Tiritiri Matangi Island, found 3.4 kilometres (2.1 mi) east of the peninsula. Major communities on the Hibiscus Coast include Orewa, the Whangaparāoa Peninsula, Silverdale, and the villages of Stillwater, Hatfields Beach and Waiwera.

The area is home to six rivers, estuaries and streams: the Waiwera Estuary, to the north, Ōtānerua Stream, Nukumea Stream, Ōrewa River, Weiti River, and Ōkura River to the south.

Beaches in the region are predominantly sandy, with gentle slopes. Many of these are wide and provide excellent opportunities for sunbathing, swimming, and water sports. Red Beach and Orewa are some of Auckland's best beginner surf beaches, whilst other Hibiscus Coast beaches are more suitable for swimming and families.

Tiritiri Matangi Island is an open sanctuary, and the largest island off the Hibiscus Coast. Tiritiri Matangi is located a short distance off the end of the Whangaparāoa Peninsula adjacent to the Shakespear Regional Park. Mahurangi Island is a smaller Island which sits off the mouth of the Waiwera River, the island forms part of the Wenderholm Regional Park. The smallest island on the Hibiscus Coast is Kotanui Island / Frenchmans Cap, which sits between Matakatia and Gulf Harbour Marina.

Prior to European settlement, the inland Hibiscus Coast area was densely forested, dominated by kauri, and the upper Ōrewa River catchment was a wetland. By the mid-19th century, the Whangaparāoa Peninsula was no longer forested, and was dominated by mānuka scrub and swamplands.

=== Climate ===
The Hibiscus Coast has a Warm Temperate humid subtropical (Cfa) on the Köppen Climate Classification System.

Climate data for Whangaparāoa, elevation 100 m (330 ft), (1991–2020 normals, extremes 1999–present)
Month	Jan	Feb	Mar	Apr	May	Jun	Jul	Aug	Sep	Oct	Nov	Dec	Year
Record high °C (°F)	30.6 (87.1)	30.5 (86.9)	27.6 (81.7)	26.2 (79.2)	22.7 (72.9)	21.4 (70.5)	19.3 (66.7)	20.4 (68.7)	22.2 (72.0)	23.1 (73.6)	26.4 (79.5)	27.7 (81.9)	30.6 (87.1)
Mean maximum °C (°F)	27.0 (80.6)	27.2 (81.0)	25.6 (78.1)	23.4 (74.1)	21.1 (70.0)	18.6 (65.5)	17.3 (63.1)	18.4 (65.1)	20.1 (68.2)	21.5 (70.7)	23.3 (73.9)	25.6 (78.1)	27.7 (81.9)
Mean daily maximum °C (°F)	23.6 (74.5)	24.1 (75.4)	22.5 (72.5)	20.2 (68.4)	17.6 (63.7)	15.3 (59.5)	14.4 (57.9)	15.0 (59.0)	16.4 (61.5)	18.0 (64.4)	19.6 (67.3)	21.8 (71.2)	19.0 (66.3)
Daily mean °C (°F)	19.8 (67.6)	20.5 (68.9)	19.2 (66.6)	17.2 (63.0)	14.9 (58.8)	12.8 (55.0)	11.8 (53.2)	12.1 (53.8)	13.2 (55.8)	14.6 (58.3)	16.0 (60.8)	18.2 (64.8)	15.9 (60.5)
Mean daily minimum °C (°F)	16.0 (60.8)	16.9 (62.4)	15.9 (60.6)	14.3 (57.7)	12.3 (54.1)	10.2 (50.4)	9.2 (48.6)	9.3 (48.7)	10.1 (50.2)	11.2 (52.2)	12.4 (54.3)	14.5 (58.1)	12.7 (54.8)
Mean minimum °C (°F)	12.6 (54.7)	13.8 (56.8)	12.6 (54.7)	10.3 (50.5)	8.1 (46.6)	6.6 (43.9)	5.5 (41.9)	6.1 (43.0)	6.4 (43.5)	7.7 (45.9)	8.9 (48.0)	10.9 (51.6)	4.7 (40.5)
Record low °C (°F)	10.5 (50.9)	11.4 (52.5)	9.7 (49.5)	7.5 (45.5)	4.0 (39.2)	4.1 (39.4)	3.4 (38.1)	2.3 (36.1)	4.6 (40.3)	5.9 (42.6)	7.0 (44.6)	7.4 (45.3)	2.3 (36.1)
Average rainfall mm (inches)	53.9 (2.12)	64.1 (2.52)	87.7 (3.45)	82.1 (3.23)	117.8 (4.64)	108.0 (4.25)	100.2 (3.94)	87.4 (3.44)	87.5 (3.44)	73.0 (2.87)	59.3 (2.33)	79.2 (3.12)	1,000.2 (39.35)
Source: NIWA

== Etymology ==
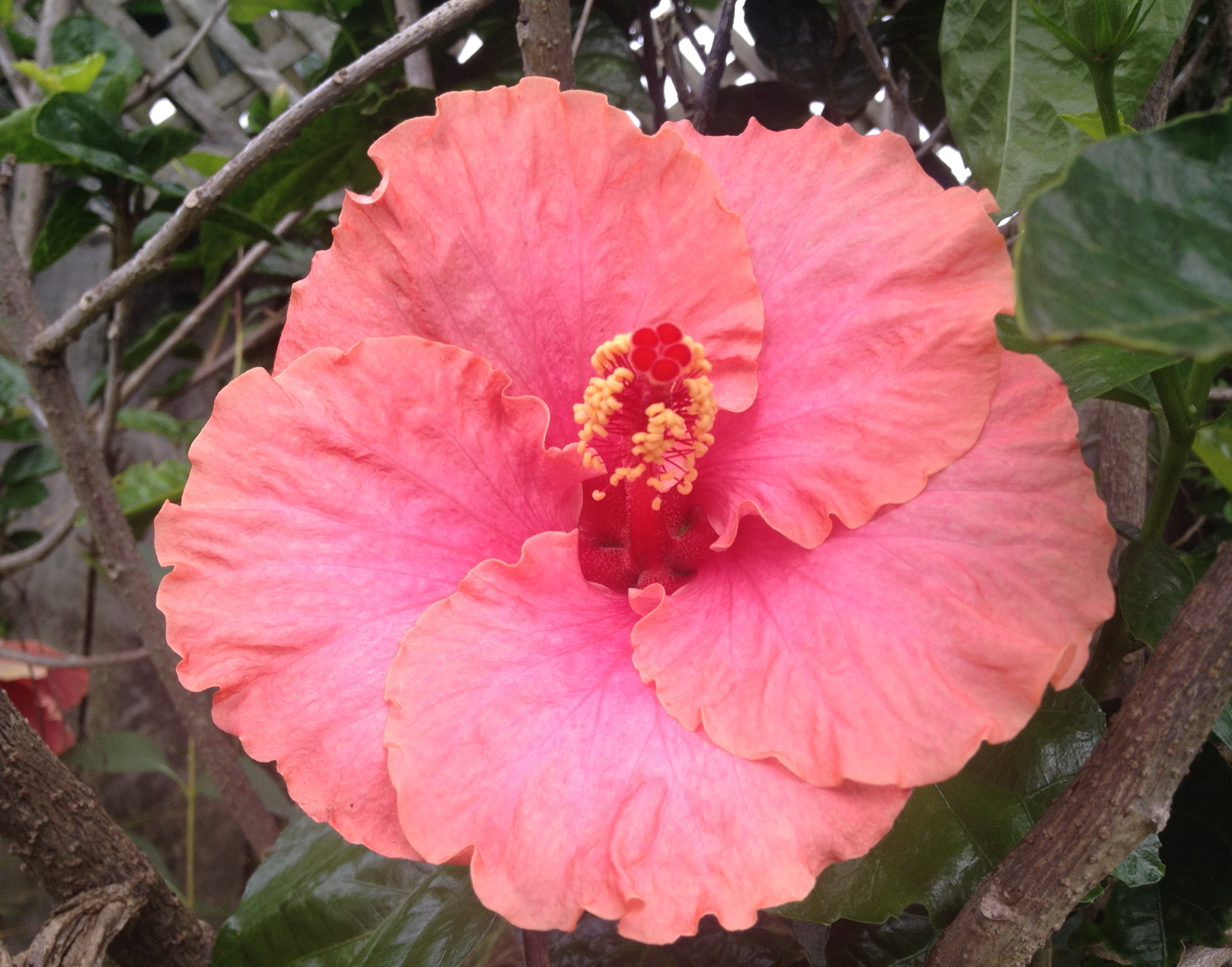
A Hibiscus rosa-sinensis flower in Orewa. Hibiscus plants are the namesake of the region

The name Hibiscus Coast dates from the early 1960s, when a group of Whangaparāoa and Orewa businessmen looked for an inclusive name for the developing Whangaparāoa/Orewa area. The group chose hibiscus, a non-native flower, due to its associations with beach and holiday atmospheres. Hibiscus was also used as the name of one of the minereal baths at the Waiwera Hot Pools in the early 20th century. The Hibiscus Coast Association was established in the 1960s, and lobbied against other regions of New Zealand adopting the hibiscus as a symbol. The name was officially adopted in 1971, when the Whangaparaoa Riding of the Waitemata County was renamed the Hibiscus Coast Riding.

Hibiscus Coast has been translated into Māori as Te Kūiti o te Puarangi, referring to puarangi, a rare native species of hibiscus.

== History ==
=== Māori history ===
The Hibiscus Coast area has been settled since at least the 13th century, with many of the first Māori occupants identifying as Ngā Oho. The wider area between the Ōrewa River and Mahurangi River was traditionally known as Mahurangi, named after a pā located at the mouth of the Waiwera River. Archaeological sites in the area are most densely found at Karepiro Bay, the Ōrewa River estuary and Shakespear Regional Park, at the end of the Whangaparāoa Peninsula. The Ōrewa River estuary was an important sheltered harbour, which offered marine resources such as shellfish and flounder, and connections to inland walking routes. The Tainui migratory waka is known to have visited Whangaparāoa in the 14th century, and Tahawhakatiki, nephew of Tama-te-kapua of the Arawa waka settled at Whangaparāoa.

The Whangaparāoa Peninsula was an important transportation node between the wider Northland and Auckland regions, and was often used as a resting point for people travelling between the Mahurangi Harbour and Waitematā Harbour. Portages, where waka could be hauled overland between waterways, connected the Hibiscus Coast area to the Kaipara Harbour in the west. The Weiti Portage crossed overland between the Kaukapakapa River and the Weiti River, while the Aotoetoe portage travelled north between the Kaukapakapa River and the Ōrewa River. Additionally, the Waiau portage bisected the Whangaparāoa Peninsula between Tindalls Beach and Matakatia, and it is likely that another portage existed on the peninsula to the west, connecting Red Beach to the Weiti River.

==== Arrival of Maki ====
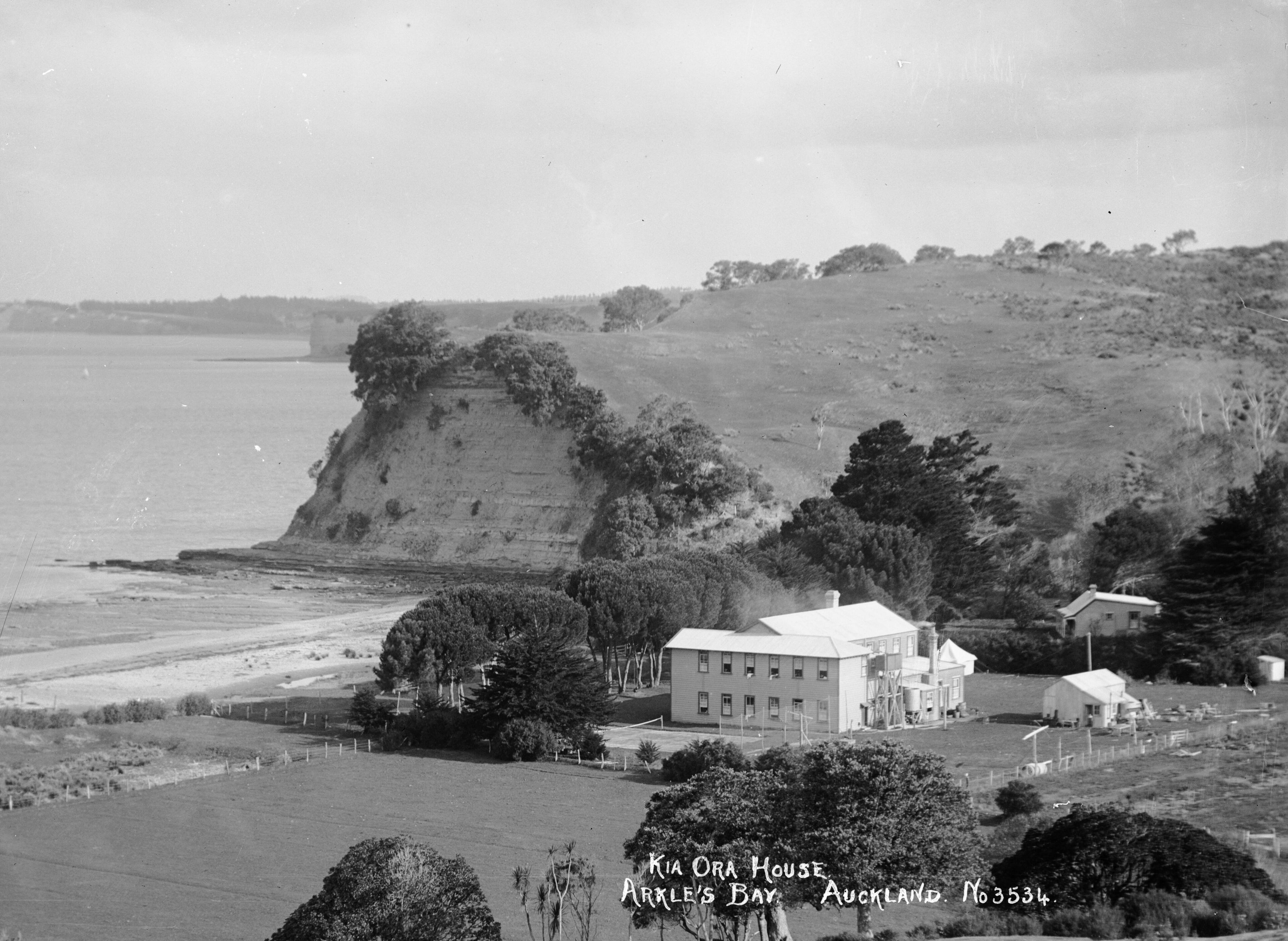
Rarowhara, found between the Weiti River and Arkles Bay, was the major defensive pā for Ngāti Kahu

Likely in the 17th century, the warrior Maki migrated from the Kāwhia Harbour to his ancestral home in the Auckland Region. Maki conquered and unified many of the Tāmaki Māori tribes as Te Kawerau ā Maki, including those of the North Shore and Hibiscus Coast. After Maki's death, his sons settled different areas of his lands, creating new hapū, including the wider Hibiscus Coast hapū of Ngāti Manuhiri, Ngāti Maraeariki, Ngāti Poataniwha and Ngāti Kahu.

Maki's younger son Maraeariki primarily settled at the head of the Ōrewa River, and his hapū Ngāti Maraeariki grew to occupy lands between Whangaparāoa and Ōmaha. Maraeariki's children Te Utu and Kahu settled along the Whangaparāoa Peninsula. Ngāti Poataniwha formed marriage links with Ngāi Tai descendants of Taihaua and Waiohua, while Ngāti Kahu, who descend from Maraeariki's daughter Kahu, formed links with both Ngāi Tai descendants of Taihaua and Ngāti Whātua o Kaipara.

Ngāti Kahu focused settlement at Te Haruhi Bay at modern Shakespear Regional Park, due to its desirble location, and held a defensive pā, Rarowhara, at the eastern headland of the Weiti River.

Outside of Rarowhara, pā were established across the wider area, including a ring of protective pā surrounding the Waiwera hot spring, Dacre Point, Alice Eaves Scenic Reserve, Rakauananga Pā at Hobbs Bay, Coalminers Bay, Big Manly Beach and Little Manly Beach.

==== Shark fishery conflict and the Musket Wars ====
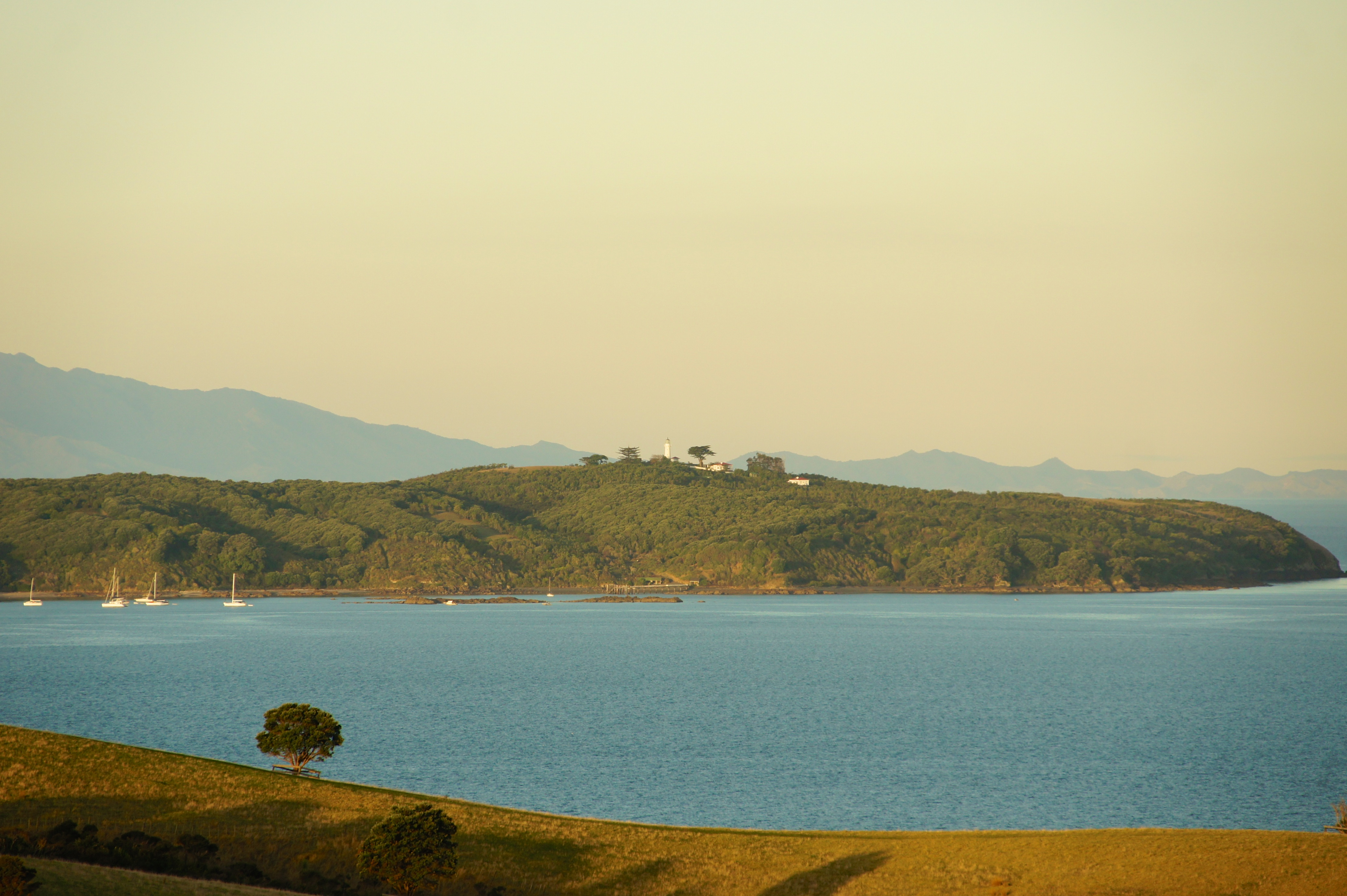
Ngāti Pāoa established a pā on Tiritiri Matangi Island in the 18th century, in order to have more access to the Whangaparāoa shark fishery

The Hibiscus Coast was the location of an important shark fishery, located between Kawau Island and the Whangaparāoa Peninsula, which was contested between iwi of the wider region. By the mid-1700s, Marutūāhu tribes from the Hauraki Gulf, especially Ngāti Pāoa, sought to control the important resource. Ngāti Pāoa established a pā on Tiritiri Matangi Island, for use during shark fishing expeditions. War between Ngāti Pāoa and Ngāti Kahu lasted until the 1790s. After a peace accord held at Mihirau at Wenderholm Regional Park was broken, Ngāti Pāoa attacked Rarowhara Pā, which Ngāti Kahu successfully defended. During this period, Kawerau-descended hapū held exclusive land rights to the Hibiscus Coast area, while fishing rights were shared between Ngāti Kahu and Marutūāhu tribes.

In September 1821 during the Musket Wars, a Ngāpuhi taua (war party) ventured south to avenge past losses against Ngāti Kahu in the 1790s. The Kawerau-descendant tribes were heavily defeated, and Rarowhara Pā was sacked. Survivors fled to the Ararimu Valley, Muriwai, and eventually to the Waikato, gradually returning in the 1830s. On return, Ngāti Kahu formed intertribal marriages with Ngāti Whātua o Kaipara, seasonally migrating between Orewa, Te Haruhi Bay and Ōkura. Ngāti Kahu settlement at Whangaparāoa continued until the 1870s.

After the war, prominent Ngāpuhi chief Eruera Maihi Patuone, who married Takarangi / Rīria, a high ranking Ngāti Paoa woman, seasonally stayed at Whangaparāoa with his Ngāti Paoa relatives.

=== Early colonial era: logging and Waiwera resort ===
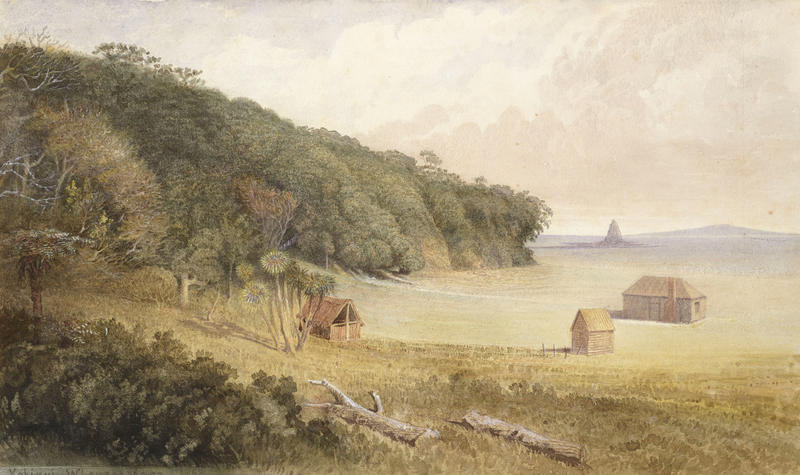
John Kinder's 1868 watercolour depicting Kotanui Island / Frenchmans Cap seen from the Whangaparāoa Peninsula

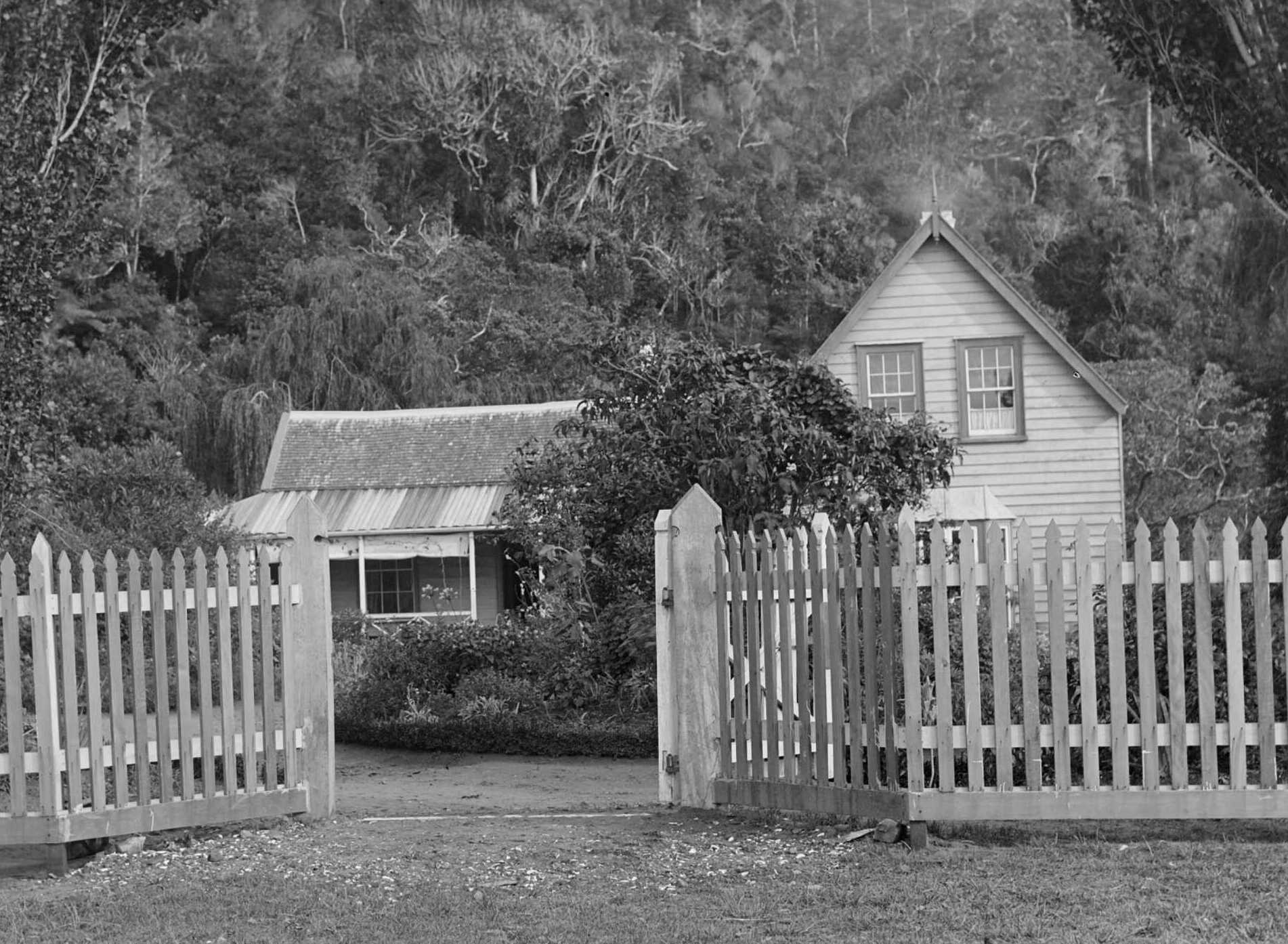
The de Grut family house at Orewa, pictured between 1880 and 1899. The house would later become a popular hotel, the Orewa House

The Waiwera Hot Pools hotel in the 1930s

The Hibiscus Coast area was visited by explorer Jules Dumont d'Urville in 1827 aboard the Astrolabe. d'Urville decided to name Karepiro Bay Tofino Bay after the Spanish navigator and mathematician Vicente Tofiño de San Miguel, and the Whangaparāoa Peninsula 'Buache'. The first known European to step ashore onto the Hibiscus Coast was a missionary in 1833, and early timber merchants were attracted to the Weiti River catchment by the late 1830s.

Following the signing of the Treaty of Waitangi in 1840, the Crown made the first purchases of the Mahurangi and Omaha blocks on 13 April 1841, which included the Hibiscus Coast. While some iwi and hapū with customary interests had been engaged, such as Ngāti Paoa and Ngāi Tai ki Tāmaki, others, including Te Kawerau ā Maki, Ngāti Manuhiri and Ngāti Rango, were not involved with transactions. This led to Ngāti Manuhiri being alienated from land on the Hibiscus Coast.

Timber felling increased along the Weiti River catchment in the 1840s, and a settlement called the Wade (modern-day Silverdale) was established at the navigable heads of the Weiti River around the year 1853, becoming the commercial centre for the area. The first known permanent settler along the Weiti River was John Robey Cole Hatfield, who settled in 1844. By 1853, there were likely between 200 and 300 people living at the Wade. Maurice and Ellen Kelly, who operated a timber milling business, opened the Wade Hotel, which became the social centre for the town. The hotel was of ill repute among early settlers to New Zealand, known for cockfighting, dog fighting, and had a reputation for criminality. Silverdale School was established as the first school on the Hibiscus Coast in 1869 (then known as Wade School).

In 1844, Robert Graham constructed a house adjacent to the Waiwera Hot Pools, publicising the hot pools as a tourist destination from 1848 onwards. In 1864, the Waiwera hot springs hotel was constructed, and by 1878 ferry services operated between Auckland and the hotel. Outside of the Wade, Ranulph Dacre acquired Weiti Station, a timber mill at modern Okura Bush Scenic Reserve in 1846, and the Polkinghorme family settled at Whangaparāoa in the 1850s, establishing a short-lived cheese factory. By the mid-1850s, the majority of accessible native forest had been logged across the region, and the Hibiscus Coast was subdivided into farming lots. Six years after the construction of New Zealand's first lighthouse, the Tiritiri Matangi Lighthouse was built in 1864. It remains New Zealand's oldest working lighthouse.

In 1856 Captain Isaac Rhodes Cooper built Orewa House with the 58th (Rutlandshire) Regiment of Foot. This became the family residence of Channel Islands migrants, the de Jersey Gruts, in 1868, after the family struggled to establish a farm at Birkenhead. Orewa House was the de Jersey Grut home for three generations, becoming a commercial guest house in 1906.

=== Early 20th century ===
As kauri gum deposits became rarer, land at Orewa was developed into orchards, where apples, pears, grapes and citrus fruit were grown for the Auckland market. By the turn of the 20th century, dairy farming had become a viable and profitable business in New Zealand. This led to escalating land prices on the Hibiscus Coast and more intensive land use, and by the 1920s orchards were replaced by dairy farms. A long jetty was constructed at Waiwera in 1905, quickly becoming dilapidated due to the wharf's length making it difficult to maintain. In 1911, the residents of the Wade decided to rename the settlement Silverdale, due to its poor reputation.

Orewa became a popular destination for campers and holidayers in the 1920s, which led to the height of popularity of Orewa House, then owned by Alice and Edward Eaves. The first holiday baches were constructed on Whangaparāoa in the 1920s, at Red Beach and Manly. Small coastal communities developed around each bay, without the entire Whangaparāoa Peninsula having a shared identity.

By the 1930s, coastal steamers were no longer the major form of transportation due to improved roading infrastructure. During the night of the 27 September 1939, a fire broke out in the Waiwera Hotel, seeing the building burnt to the ground. The fire was reportedly visible from Auckland City. The hotel's two only guests were able to escape the building safely.

Following the start of World War II, the threat of Japanese invasion saw the headland of the Whangaparāoa Peninsula chosen as one of two Auckland defence sites. Coastal defences were subsequently established in what was then the Shakespear family farm. Eleven pillboxes, and a number of other army barracks were built on the land. By 1961, the batteries and much of the other military equipment had been decommissioned. The base, remains active into the 21st century as part of the Royal New Zealand Navy as the RNZN Tamaki Training Centre.

=== Suburban development ===
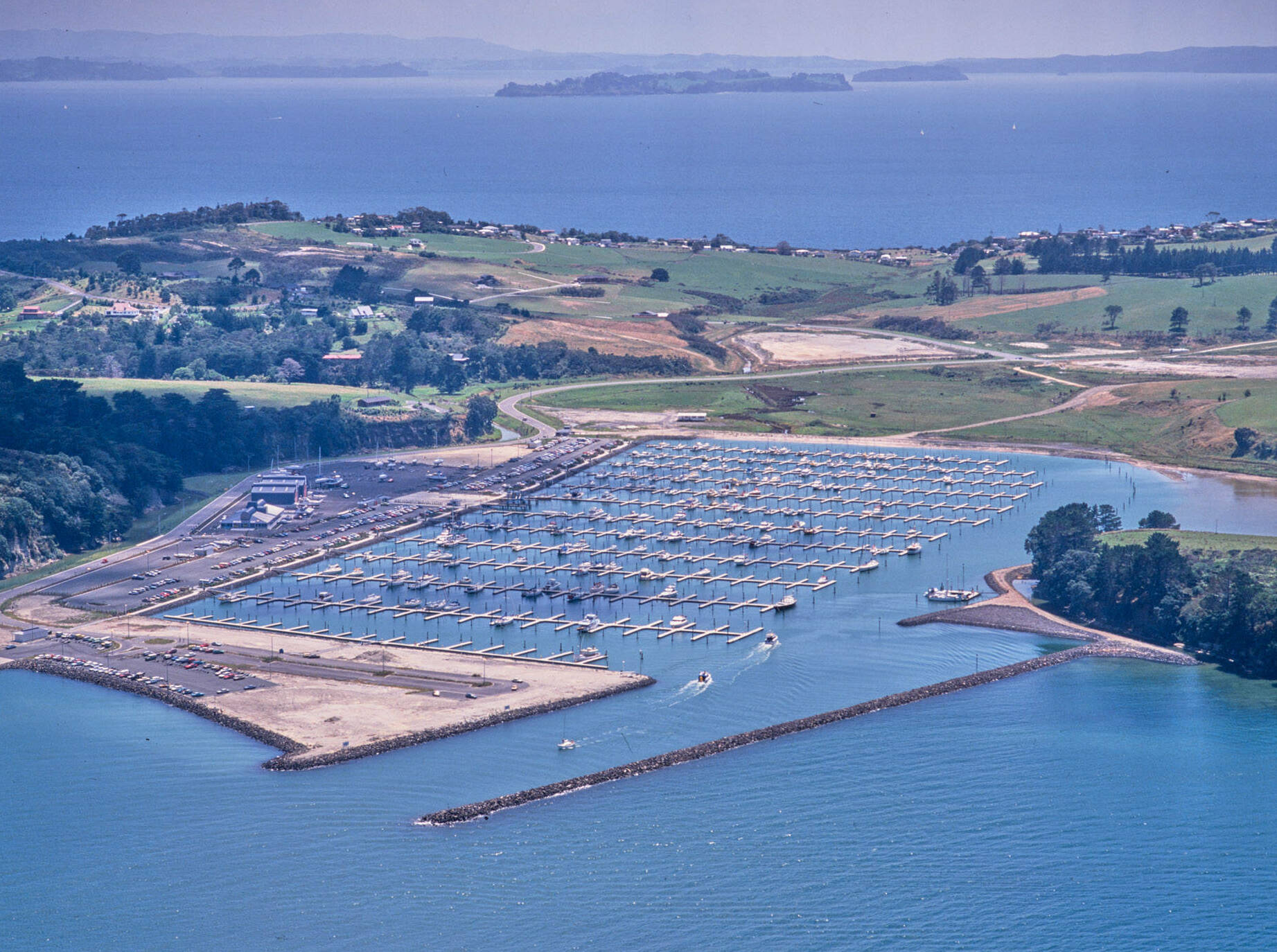
Gulf Harbour marina surrounded by farmland in the 1980s

Orewa and the Whangaparāoa Peninsula were subdivided for suburban housing in the 1950s. The Orewa town centre was developed in 1953, which included a shopping precinct and Hillary Square, joined by a town centre at Whangaparāoa in 1957. Residents narrowly decided on the name Whangaparāoa to describe the new town centre, favoured over the runner up name Glen Arkle. The Hibiscus Coast experienced a building and population boom in the 1960s, due to the opening of the Auckland Harbour Bridge. Orewa and western Whangaparāoa rapidly urbanised between 1964 and 1975, with the eastern Whangaparāoa peninsula developing in the late 1980s.

In 1957, the Orewa Skating Rink was constructed. The rink developed into an entertainment precinct for the Hibiscus Coast in the 1960s, including a minigolf range and concert space. The rink was demolished in 1983.

In the mid-1960s, the Hibiscus Coast Association was established by local businessmen, looking to create a unified identity for the Orewa and Whangaparāoa areas. As a part of their efforts, more than 1,000 hibiscus trees were planted in the area in 1964. By the end of the 1960s, the peninsula had approximately 2,000 permanent residents, with the population swelling to over 25,000 during the summer.

In 1965, the Auckland Regional Authority established Wenderholm Regional Park, the first newly established regional park in Auckland, directly adjacent to the Hibiscus Coast. This was followed by Shakespear Regional Park, at the eastern headland of the Whangaparāoa Peninsula, in 1967.

By the 1980s, large-scale housing developments were being constructed along the Whangaparāoa Peninsula. In 1990, the Centrestage Theatre was constructed in Orewa.

On 20 December 1999, the Auckland Northern Motorway was extended to Silverdale. This created a major link for the area back to the city. In 2004, a 12-storey apartment complex called the Nautilus was completed at Orewa. The only high rise building on the Hibiscus Coast, it is home to over 300 people, and in 2009 faced issues for being a leaky building. Silverdale rapidly expanded in the early 2000s.

In 2018, the Waiwera Hot Pools closed for renovations; however it never reopened. In 2023, the derelict water park was demolished.

In late 2022, construction began on O Mahurangi Penlink, a new motorway between the Auckland Northern Motorway and the Whangaparāoa Peninsula, crossing the Weiti River at Stillwater and connecting the township to the Auckland motorways network. The road is projected to open in 2026. Future areas that are zoned for development on the Hibiscus Coast include the Highgate Business Park and Weiti Lands, the area between Okura Bush Scenic Reserve and Stillwater.

== Demographics ==
Hibiscus Coast covers 49.38 km^{2} (19.07 sq mi) and had an estimated population of 68,980 as of June 2025, with a population density of 1,397 people per km^{2}.

Historical population
Year	Pop.	±% p.a.
2006	38,010	—
2013	44,145	+2.16%
2018	54,948	+4.48%
2023	64,542	+3.27%
The 2006 population is for a smaller area of 47.07 km^{2}. Source:

Hibiscus Coast had a population of 64,542 in the 2023 New Zealand census, an increase of 9,594 people (17.5%) since the 2018 census, and an increase of 20,397 people (46.2%) since the 2013 census. There were 31,083 males, 33,252 females and 201 people of other genders in 23,808 dwellings. 2.5% of people identified as LGBTIQ+. There were 12,351 people (19.1%) aged under 15 years, 9,357 (14.5%) aged 15 to 29, 29,295 (45.4%) aged 30 to 64, and 13,536 (21.0%) aged 65 or older.

People could identify as more than one ethnicity. The results were 81.4% European (Pākehā); 8.3% Māori; 2.7% Pasifika; 15.1% Asian; 1.9% Middle Eastern, Latin American and African New Zealanders (MELAA); and 2.3% other, which includes people giving their ethnicity as "New Zealander". English was spoken by 96.0%, Māori language by 1.1%, Samoan by 0.2%, and other languages by 19.7%. No language could be spoken by 2.0% (e.g. too young to talk). New Zealand Sign Language was known by 0.3%. The percentage of people born overseas was 38.1, compared with 28.8% nationally.

Religious affiliations were 35.7% Christian, 1.6% Hindu, 0.6% Islam, 0.2% Māori religious beliefs, 0.9% Buddhist, 0.4% New Age, 0.1% Jewish, and 1.2% other religions. People who answered that they had no religion were 52.2%, and 7.1% of people did not answer the census question.

Of those at least 15 years old, 11,028 (21.1%) people had a bachelor's or higher degree, 25,737 (49.3%) had a post-high school certificate or diploma, and 12,003 (23.0%) people exclusively held high school qualifications. 9,216 people (17.7%) earned over $100,000 compared to 12.1% nationally. The employment status of those at least 15 was that 26,364 (50.5%) people were employed full-time, 7,107 (13.6%) were part-time, and 996 (1.9%) were unemployed.

Individual statistical areas
Name	Area (km^{2})	Population	Density (per km^{2})	Dwellings	Median age	Median income
Waiwera	0.55	252	458	141	58.8 years	$35,900
Hibiscus Coast	48.39	63,351	1,309	23,343	42.1 years	$45,300
Stillwater	0.44	939	2,134	324	40.5 years	$59,200
New Zealand					38.1 years	$41,500

== Notable people ==
- Russell Coutts – international sailing champion. Coutts lives on the Hibiscus Coast, where he is president of the Manly Sailing Club and has started the Russell Coutts Sailing Foundation.
- Janet Frame – author. Frame lived at Whangaparāoa adjacent to Shakespear Regional Park in the 1970s.
- Edmund Hillary – mountaineer and explorer. Hillary's family owned a holiday home in Orewa, where he spent time in the 1930s. Hillary Square was named after him in 1953, and a concrete statue of Hillary was unveiled in 1983, later replaced with a bronze statue in 1991.
- Barbara Kendall – Olympic windsurfing champion. Kendall lives on the Hibiscus Coast, where she founded Gulf Harbour School.
- Robert Muldoon – former New Zealand Prime Minister. Muldoon owned a holiday home in Hatfields Beach where he would spend his holidays. Muldoon gave speeches and entertained on the Hibiscus Coast throughout his life.
- Caitlin Regal – Olympic canoeing champion. Regal grew up on the Hibiscus Coast, where she qualified as a life guard at Red Beach Surf Lifesaving Club.

== Recreation ==
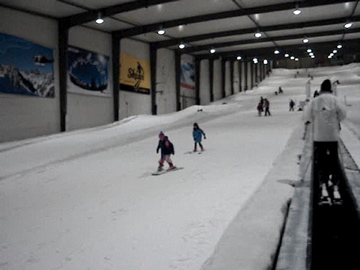
Snowplanet indoor ski slope

The Hibiscus Coast has a number of beaches that attract people to live there. Other places of interest on the coast or nearby include Snowplanet, Auckland Adventure Park, the Waiwera Hot Pools (now abandoned), Orewa Beach, Shakespear Regional Park, and Gulf Harbour. Gulf Harbour is near the end of the Whangaparaoa Peninsula, which is quite close to the wildlife reserve Tiritiri Matangi Island. Ferries transport people to the island from the harbour and back on a regular basis.

== Politics ==
From 1877 until 1974, the area was administered by the Waitemata County, a large rural county north and west of the city of Auckland. In 1974 the county was dissolved, becoming part of Rodney County, them from 1989 to 2010 Rodney District. Orewa was the administrative centre for the Rodney District. The Hibiscus Coast was amalgamated into Auckland Council in November 2010, under a single unitary authority system.

Within the Auckland Council, the Hibiscus Coast subdivision is a part of the Hibiscus and Bays local government area governed by the Hibiscus and Bays Local Board. It is a part of the Albany ward, which elects two councillors to the Auckland Council.

== Education ==
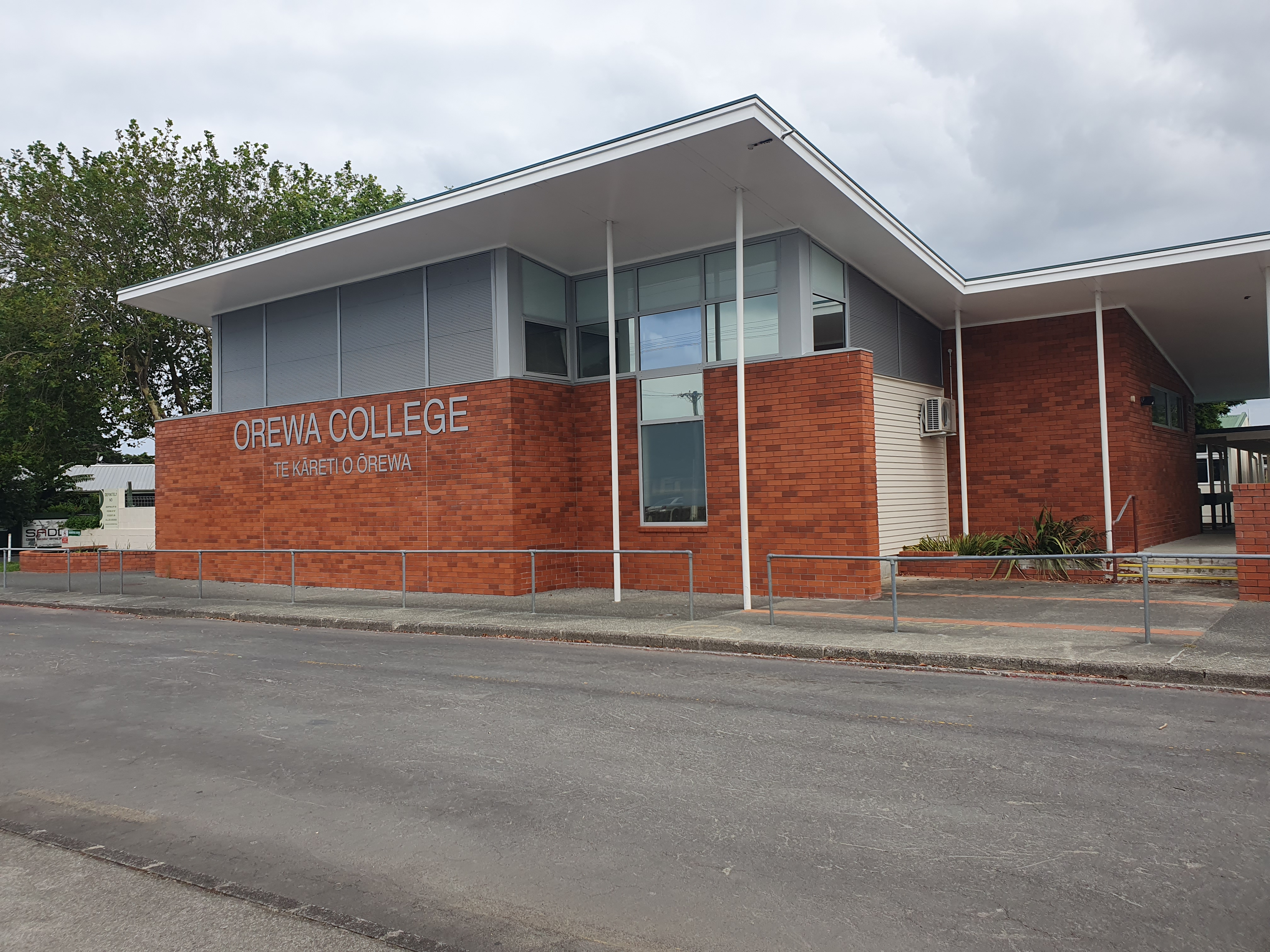
Orewa College

=== Primary ===
- Gulf Harbour School, is a primary school which first opened in 1998.
- KingsWay School - Junior Campus, is a state-integrated Christian school, which was first established in 1986, moving to a new site in 1990, where the senior campus later opened, and then to its own site in 2014.
- Nukumea Primary School, announced in 2018 as Orewa North West Primary School, in 2021, work began on the third Orewa primary school which, opened in term one 2023.
- Orewa Beach Primary School, was the second of three primary schools located in Orewa, it was founded as Orewa North Primary in 1978.
- Orewa Primary School, the first of three very similarly sized primary school located in Orewa, formed from the Orewa District High School was founded in 1956.
- Red Beach Primary, was established in 1989.
- Silverdale Primary School, the oldest school on the coast, was founded in 1869, and in 2006 the school moved to its current site. As of 2019 it no longer offered years 7 and 8 classes.
- Stanmore Bay Primary.
- Wentworth Primary, is a private primary school located in Gulf Harbour, established in 2008 following the success of the secondary school.
- Whangaparāoa Primary.

=== Secondary ===
- Orewa College, formed in 1974 from the Orewa District High School which was originally founded in 1956.
- Wentworth College, a private secondary school located in Gulf Harbour, started in 2003.
- Whangaparaoa College, formed from Hibiscus Coast Intermediate School and was formally established 2005.
- KingsWay School - Senior Campus, a state-integrated Christian secondary school, was first opened in 1992 following growth in the primary school.

== Transport ==
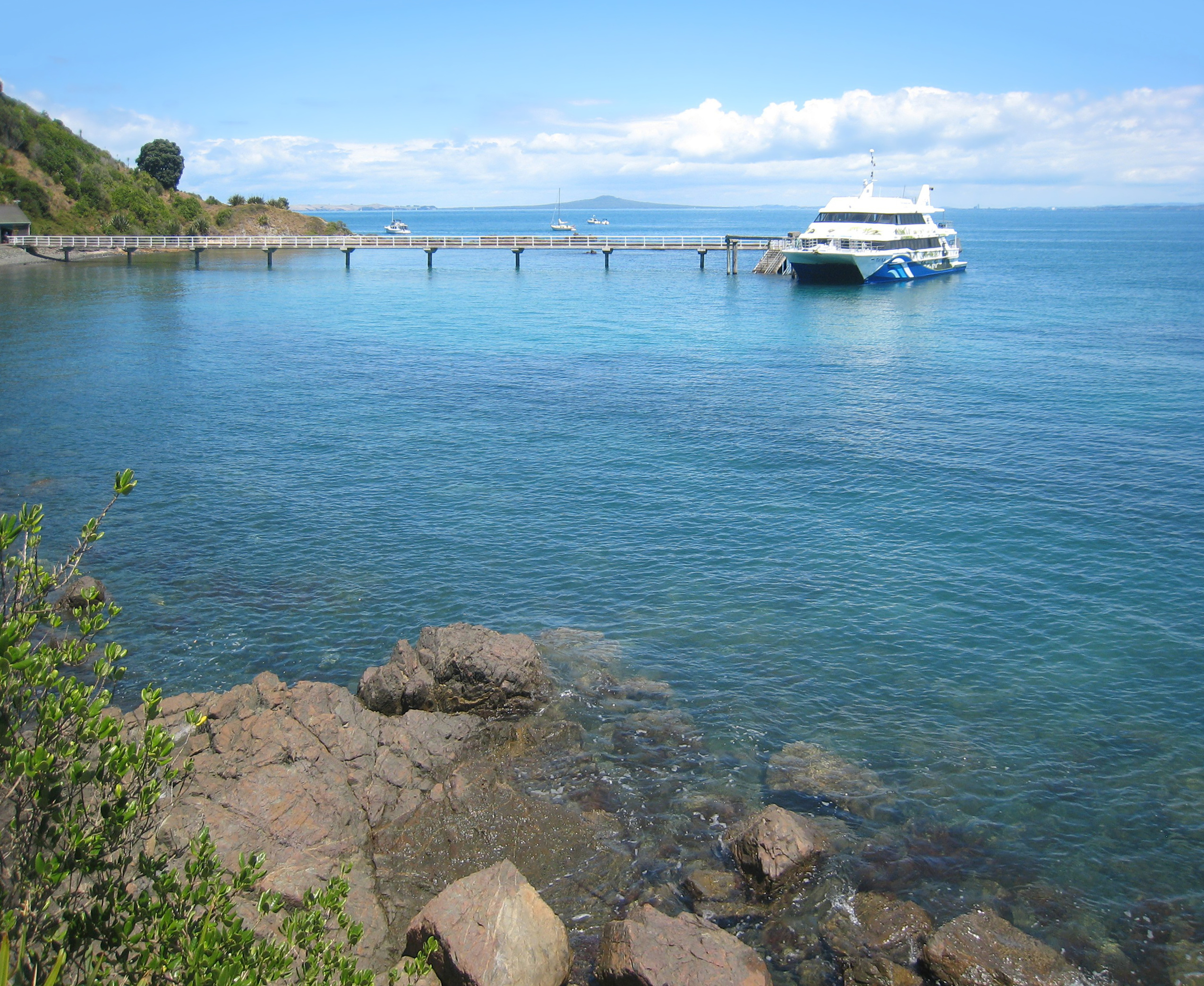
Ferry at Tiritiri Matangi Island

=== Roading infrastructure ===
Marking the inner boundary of the Hibiscus Coast is Auckland's Northern Motorway (State Highway One). The motorway was extended to Orewa at the end of the 1990s. In early 2009, a further motorway extension connected the motorway to Puhoi, creating the Northern Gateway Toll Road and replacing that section of State Highway 17.

Connecting State Highway One at Silverdale to Puhoi via Orewa and Hatfields Beach, the Hibiscus Coast Highway was formerly a section of State Highway 17 and prior to that State Highway One. Motorway extensions allowed the Hibiscus Coast Highway to be repurposed to serve growth in the local areas.

Set to connect State Highway One at Weiti Station (between Silverdale and Albany) to Stillwater and Stanmore Bay, O Mahurangi Penlink will be a crucial connection to the Whangaparāoa Peninsula. The new connection will feature a new crossing of the Weiti River and is set to open in 2026.

=== Bus services ===
Auckland Transport local bus routes are operated by AT Metro across the Hibiscus Coast. Urban Rapid Transit services operate from the Hibiscus Coast Busway Station and connect the coast to central Auckland and Warkworth. InterCity services also operate via the Hibiscus Coast Busway Station.

=== Ferry services ===
Auckland Transport commuter ferry services are operated by Fullers360, running between Gulf Harbour and Downtown Auckland on weekdays. Tourism services are operated by Explore via Gulf Harbour to Tiritiri Matangi Island and operate year-round.

== Sport ==
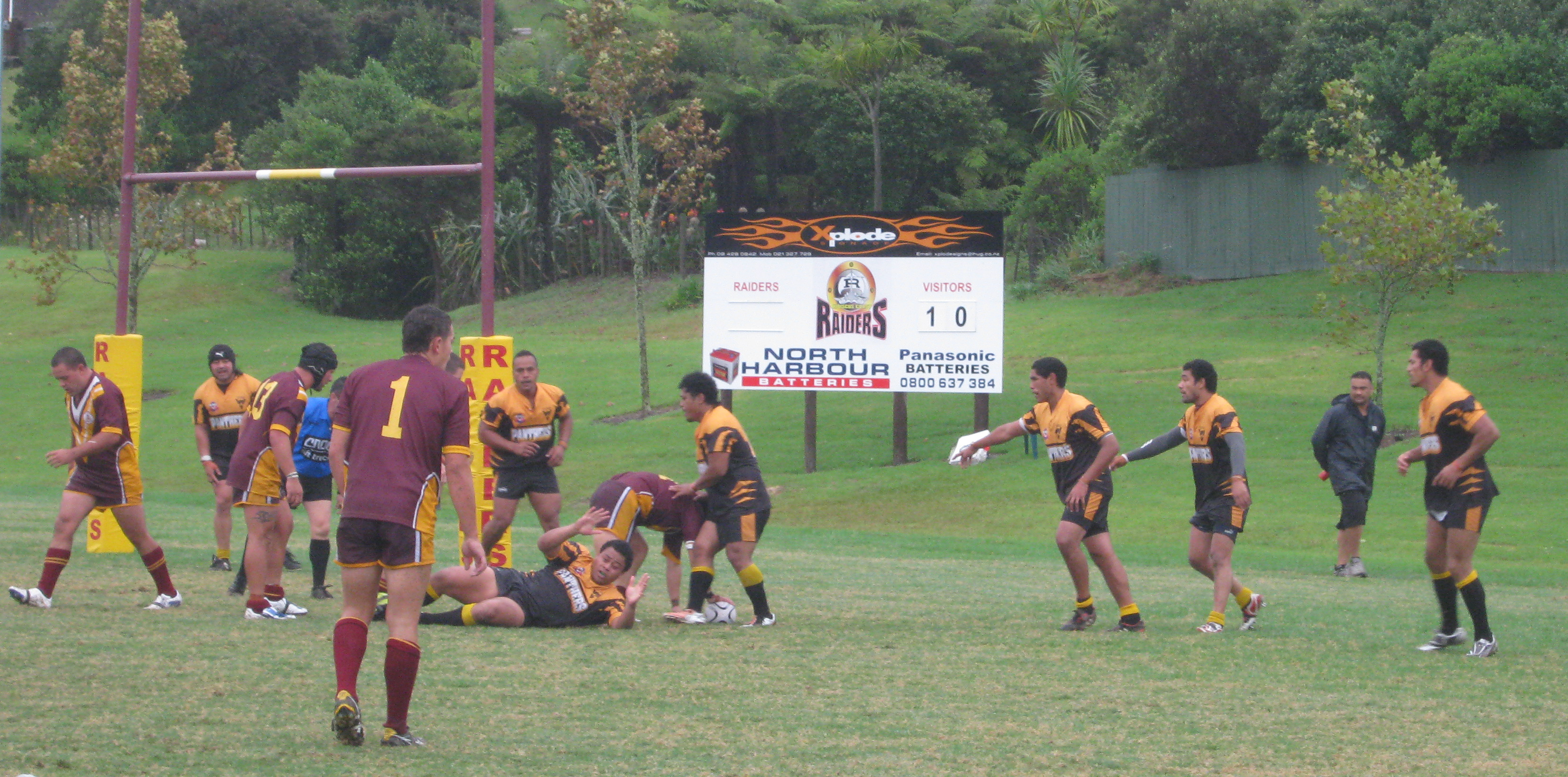
The Hibiscus Coast Raiders are rugby league club based in Stanmore Bay, who play as a part of the Auckland Rugby League

=== Bowling ===
The Hibiscus Coast is home to two outdoor lawn bowling clubs, one in Orewa, and another in Manly. A third bowls club formerly operated in Silverdale at the War Memorial Park, but closed prior to 2018.

=== Football ===
Founded in 1974, the Hibiscus Coast AFC is an amateur football club based in Stanmore Bay which competes in the Lotto Sport Italia NRFL Division 2.

=== Golf ===
The Hibiscus Coast formally had three golf clubs, as of 2023 only the Whangaparaoa Golf Club remains operational. Whangaparaoa Golf Club first opened in the 1950s and is located on 41 acres in Army Bay. The former Peninsula Golf Course was originally formed in 1956. It was an 18-hole golf course which covered almost 45 hectares. In 2014, Fletcher Living was granted a consent to convert the golf course to a residential development.

Following the development of Gulf Harbour, the Gulf Harbour Country Club opened in 1997, the following year, the club hosted the 1998 World Cup of Golf. Then in 2005 and 2006 the club hosted the New Zealand Open. In July 2023 the club closed after "two years of unsuccessfully looking for ways to make the running of the club financially viable".

=== Netball ===
The Hibiscus Coast Netball Centre is home to six netball courts and is located in Manly, on Edith Hopper Park. In 2009 the Silverdale Seahawks Netball Club was established.

=== Rugby ===
==== Union ====
The Silverdale United Rugby Club is a rugby union club based in Silverdale. The club was established in 1887 in 1963 the Kaukapakapa Rugby Club was merged with the Silverdale Club. During the 2011 Rugby World Cup, New Zealand rugby clubs were asked to host country's national teams, as a result, the Silverdale War Memorial Park grounds played host to teams from Japan, Namibia, and Samoa.

==== League ====
The Hibiscus Coast Raiders rugby league club is based in Stanmore Bay. The club is a part of the Auckland Rugby League and compete in the Fox Memorial Championship.

=== Sailing ===
The Hibiscus Coast is home to two Yacht and Sailing Clubs, the Gulf Harbour Yacht Club is based in Gulf Harbour and faces towards the south side of the Whangaparāoa Peninsula whilst the Manly Sailing Club is located on Big Manly Beach on the north side. Both clubs host a variety of Regional, National and International regattas. As of 2023, only the Manly Sailing Club offer Learn to Sail Programmes in their respective classes.

=== Surf Life Saving ===
Two Hibiscus Coast beaches, Orewa and Red Beach are patrolled by lifeguards over the summer months. Orewa Surf Lifesaving Club was first established in 1950 with the current club building opening in 1960. Orewa Surf Lifesaving Club is currently developing a new Surf Life Saving Community Hub on the site of the existing club. Red Beach Surf Life Saving Club was formed three years after Orewa in 1953, the first club house was completed in 1956 then replaced with a new building in 1983.

Auckland Surf Park is a planned artificial surfing lagoon set to open between 2026 and 2027 in nearby Dairy Flat.

=== Tennis ===
The Silverdale Tennis Club is located in the Silverdale War Memorial Park. Two tennis clubs are situated in Manly at Edith Hopper Park and Manly Park. Another Tennis Club is located in Victor Eaves Park, Orewa.

== Bibliography ==
- Billman, Mary (1965). A Century in Hot Water: a Tale of Waiera. The Rodney and Waitemata Times.
- Cameron, Ewen; Hayward, Bruce; Murdoch, Graeme (2008). A Field Guide to Auckland: Exploring the Region's Natural and Historical Heritage. Random House New Zealand. ISBN 978-1-86962-1513.
- Destination Orewa Beach (2021). Orewa: Then + Now. Destination Orewa Beach. ISBN 978-0-473-58724-6.
- Grover, Robin (1996). The Story of Silverdale......Alias the Wade 1839–1853. ISBN 0-473-04002-6.
- Grover, Robin (2008). Why the Hibiscus? Place Names of the Hibiscus Coast. Silverdale Printing. ISBN 978-0-473-13484-6.
- Stone, R. C. J. (2001). From Tamaki-makau-rau to Auckland. Auckland University Press. ISBN 1869402596.
