= Whangaparāoa College =

- Māori: Kāreti o Whangaparāoa

Location
- 8 Stanmore Bay Rd, Stanmore Bay, Whangaparāoa, Auckland, New Zealand; 36.6317°S 174.7455°E

Information
- Type: Non-Integrated co-ed, Composite (Year 7–13)
- Motto: Together, Believe, Achieve (Ngatahi, Whakapono, Tutuki)
- Established: 28 January 2005; 21 years ago
- Ministry of Education Institution no.: 6763
- Principal: Steve McCracken
- Enrolment: 1,904 (July 2026)
- Colours: Blue; Green
- Socio-economic decile: 9Q
- Former names: Stanmore Bay Secondary School; Hibiscus Coast Intermediate School
- Website: wgpcollege.school.nz

Whangaparāoa College is a co-educational state secondary school on the Hibiscus Coast of New Zealand. The school has a roll of 1,904 students from Years 7 to 13 (as of July 2026), including international students.

== History ==
Prior to the opening of Whangaparāoa College, Orewa College was the sole secondary school operating on the Hibiscus Coast. Hibiscus Coast Intermediate School operated on the site now occupied by Whangaparāoa College.

Announced in 2003, and initially named Stanmore Bay Secondary School, Whangaparāoa College opened on 28 January 2005 absorbing Hibiscus Coast Intermediate School. Brian O'Connell served as founding principal until 2012.

As one of several modern high schools to open in the early 2000s alongside Botany Downs Secondary College and Alfriston College, the school's facilities and technology used are leaders in the New Zealand education system, being only the third new high school to open since 1981. Whangaparāoa College positions itself as an environmentally aware site.

Following O'Connell's departure, James Thomas served as principal from 2012. In mid-2021, Steve McCracken took over as principal.

== Demographics ==
At the school's latest Education Review Office review in 2016, Whangaparāoa College had 1285 students enrolled. Fifty-two percent of students were female and forty-eight percent were male. Seventy-eight percent of students identified as European New Zealanders (Pākehā), ten percent as Māori, four percent as Asian, two percent as Pasifika, and six percent as another ethnicity.

Whangaparāoa College has an equity index rating of 447, placing it amongst schools whose students have below average socioeconomic barriers to achievement (roughly equivalent to decile 7 under the former socio-economic decile system).

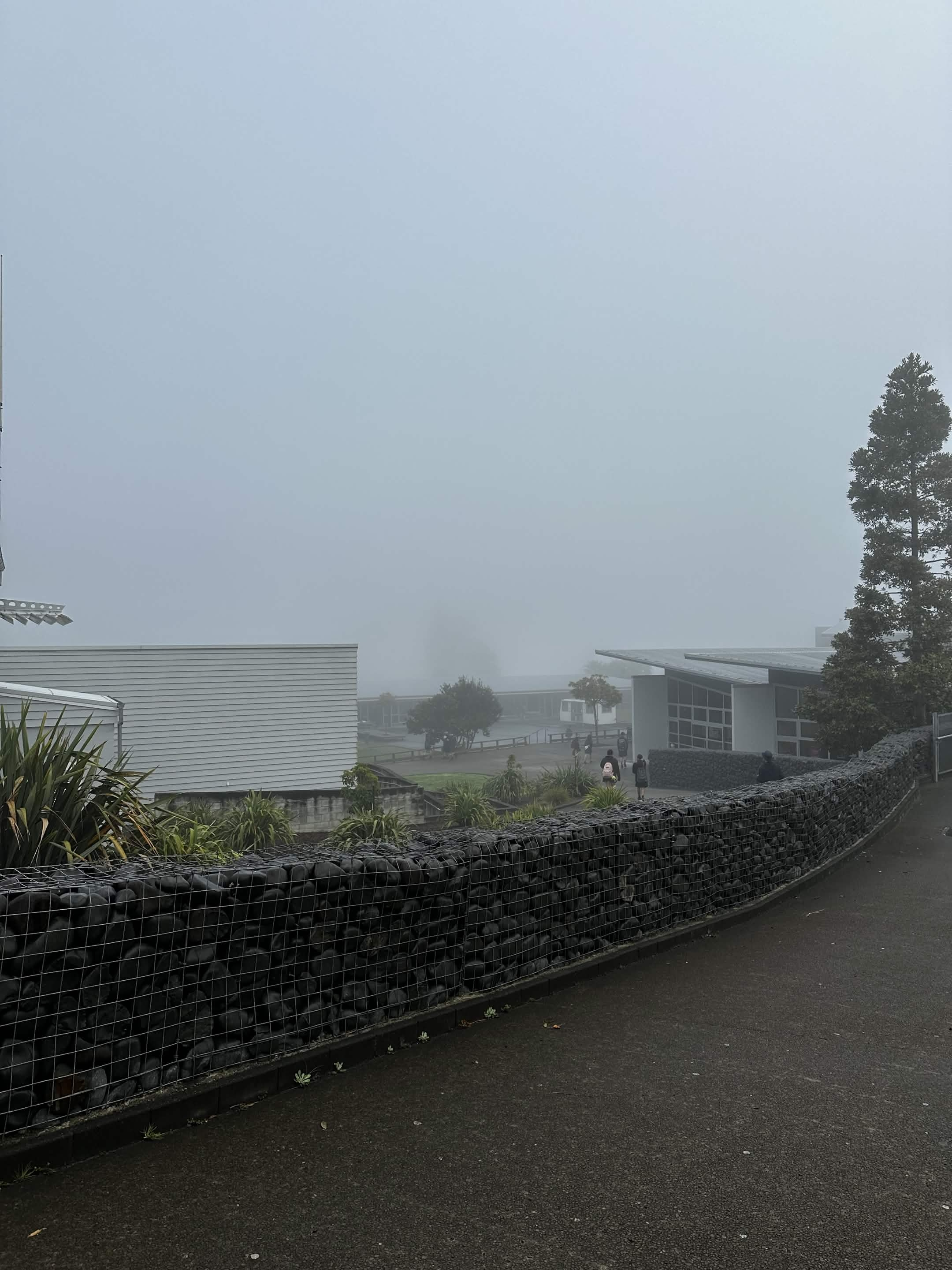
Facing into the centre of the college, 2023
