= Snowplanet =

Indoor ski area in Silverdale, New Zealand

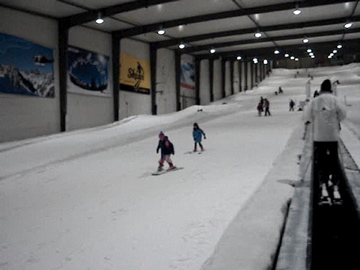
- Snow slope inside at Snowplanet

- Location within Auckland
- Location: Hibiscus Coast, New Zealand
- Nearest city: Auckland
- Coordinates: 36.6353°S 174.6666°E
- Status: Operating
- Opened: March 2005
- Vertical: 25 m (82 ft)
- Longest run: 200 metres (660 ft)
- Website: https://snowplanet.co.nz

Snowplanet is an indoor snow recreation centre in Silverdale on the Hibiscus Coast in New Zealand.

Snowplanet is New Zealand's first and only indoor snow facility and began working in March 2005. The snow dome, approximately 40 × 200 m and built on the side of a hill, features 50 centimetres of real snow (man-made), three tows, a terrain park for freestyle skiers and snowboarders and a separate learners slope. It has thrilling Snow activities like Snow slides, Snow play area, and Snow dance floor.

The company offers ski rentals and lessons, offers a wide range of programs for all abilities and offers group bookings for schools and businesses. It also has a small store that sells gloves, helmets and socks and offers a range of off-snow services, including; a restaurant & licensed bar, meeting and conference facilities.
