= Hatfields Beach =

- Suburb
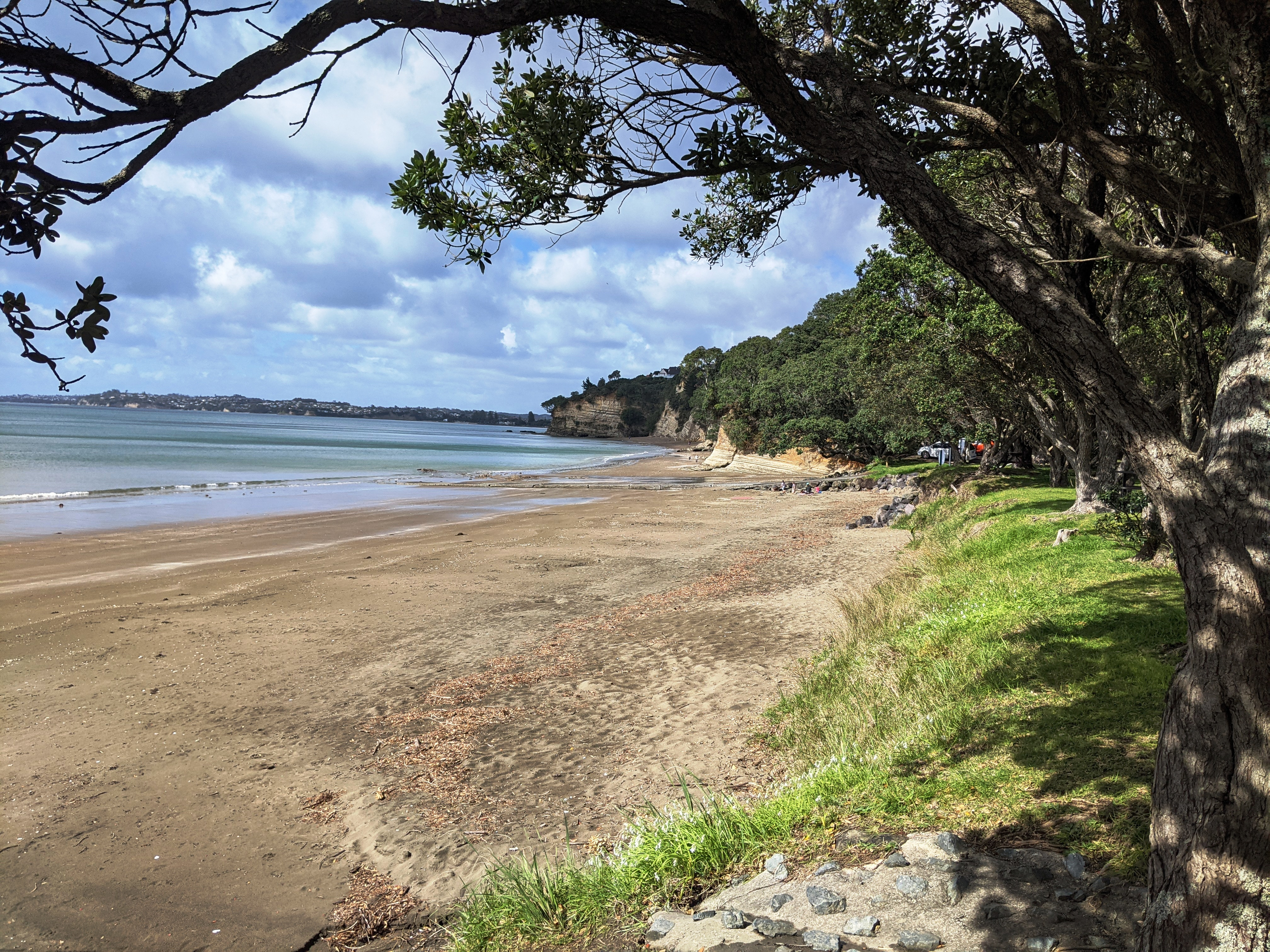
- Ōtānerua-Hatfields Beach
- Interactive map of Hatfields Beach
- Coordinates: 36.569°S 174.691°E
- Country: New Zealand
- City: Auckland
- Local authority: Auckland Council
- Electoral ward: Albany ward
- Local board: Hibiscus and Bays

Area
  - Land: 92 ha (230 acres)

Population (June 2025)
  - Total: 1,540
  - Density: 1,700/km^{2} (4,300/sq mi)

Puhoi		Waiwera
	Hatfields Beach	(Hauraki Gulf)
Wainui	Orewa

Hatfields Beach is a northern coastal suburb of Auckland, in New Zealand. It is on the Hibiscus Coast Highway about 40 kilometres (by road) north of the city centre. In 2011, the beach was officially gazetted as Ōtānerua / Hatfields Beach.

== History ==
The traditional Tāmaki Māori name for the area is Ōtānerua, a name used for the beach and the stream that flows into the beach. European settlers in the 1850s continued to use a version of the name, Otenerua. By 1870, the area was known at Hatfield Bay by 1870, after John Robey Hatfield, his wife Emma, and son Alexander John Hatfield, who settled at the beach. The Hatfield family lived for three generations at the beach.

By the early 20th century, the Sykes family had bought land on southern slopes. In the latter 20th century, prime minister Robert Muldoon lived at his family's bach in Hatfields Beach, which had been built by his father in law in 1959.

The Auckland Unitary Plan proposes that the block to the north of Hatfields, between State Highway 1 and the Hibiscus Coast Highway, and south of the Waiwera River, which at the time the plan was produced was a mixture of native bush and marginal farmland, be redeveloped to include clusters of rural lifestyle blocks with protected areas and a walking trail to Waiwera.

== Demographics ==
Hatfields Beach covers 0.92 km^{2} (0.36 sq mi) and had an estimated population of 1,540 as of June 2025, with a population density of 1,674 people per km^{2}.

Historical population
Year	Pop.	±% p.a.
2006	1,194	—
2013	1,380	+2.09%
2018	1,554	+2.40%
2023	1,512	−0.55%

Hatfields Beach had a population of 1,512 in the 2023 New Zealand census, a decrease of 42 people (−2.7%) since the 2018 census, and an increase of 132 people (9.6%) since the 2013 census. There were 747 males, 756 females and 12 people of other genders in 564 dwellings. 3.2% of people identified as LGBTIQ+. The median age was 43.7 years (compared with 38.1 years nationally). There were 255 people (16.9%) aged under 15 years, 246 (16.3%) aged 15 to 29, 735 (48.6%) aged 30 to 64, and 279 (18.5%) aged 65 or older.

People could identify as more than one ethnicity. The results were 89.7% European (Pākehā); 11.7% Māori; 3.2% Pasifika; 6.2% Asian; 0.6% Middle Eastern, Latin American and African New Zealanders (MELAA); and 4.0% other, which includes people giving their ethnicity as "New Zealander". English was spoken by 97.6%, Māori language by 1.6%, Samoan by 0.2%, and other languages by 12.1%. No language could be spoken by 1.8% (e.g. too young to talk). New Zealand Sign Language was known by 0.2%. The percentage of people born overseas was 30.0, compared with 28.8% nationally.

Religious affiliations were 28.8% Christian, 0.8% Hindu, 0.2% Islam, 0.6% Māori religious beliefs, 0.2% Buddhist, 0.6% New Age, and 0.8% other religions. People who answered that they had no religion were 60.1%, and 8.3% of people did not answer the census question.

Of those at least 15 years old, 231 (18.4%) people had a bachelor's or higher degree, 672 (53.5%) had a post-high school certificate or diploma, and 282 (22.4%) people exclusively held high school qualifications. The median income was $48,900, compared with $41,500 nationally. 228 people (18.1%) earned over $100,000 compared to 12.1% nationally. The employment status of those at least 15 was that 678 (53.9%) people were employed full-time, 186 (14.8%) were part-time, and 30 (2.4%) were unemployed.

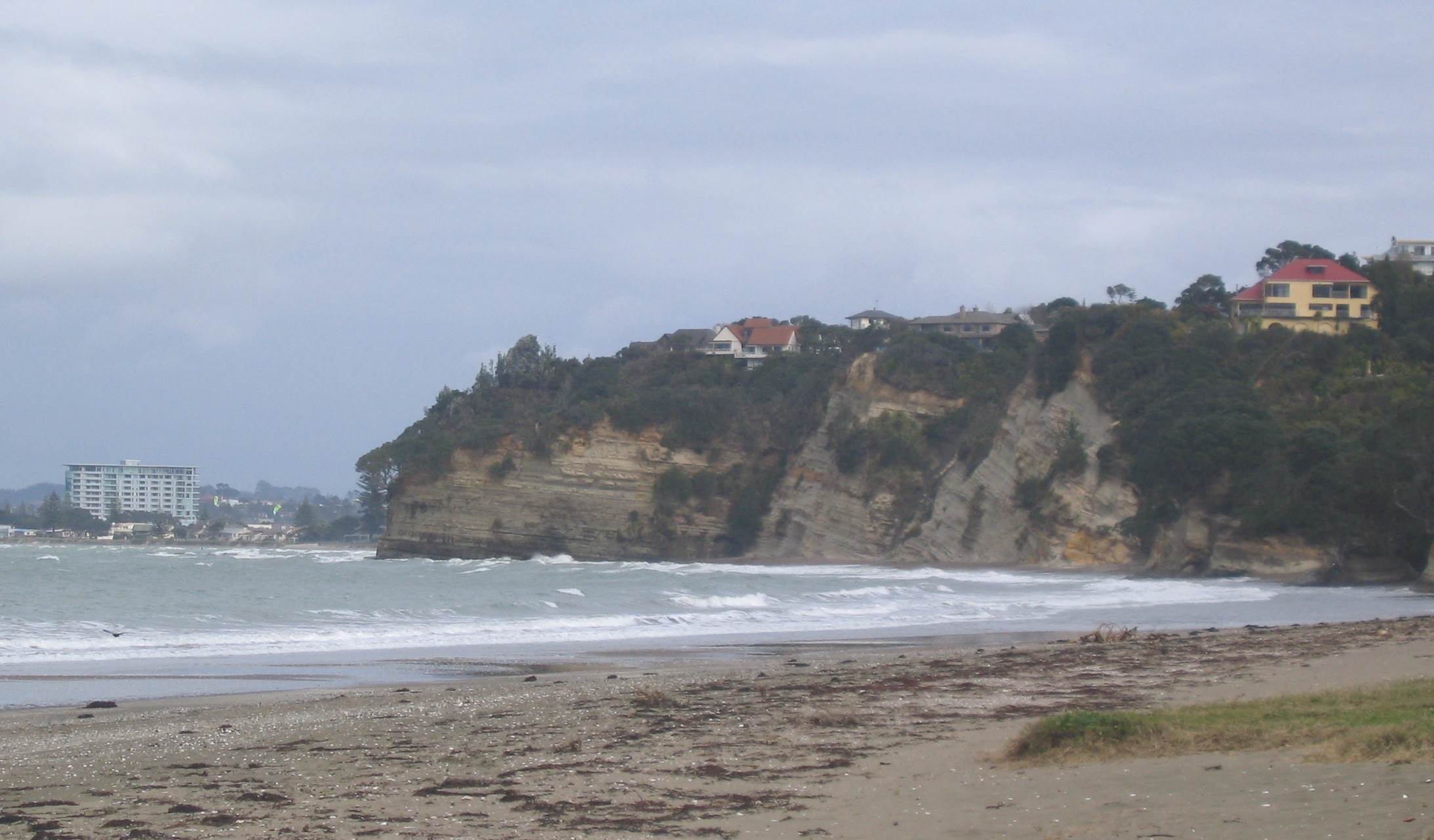
Hatfields Beach, looking south towards Orewa
