= Kotanui Island / Frenchmans Cap =

Island in New Zealand

Māori: Kotanui
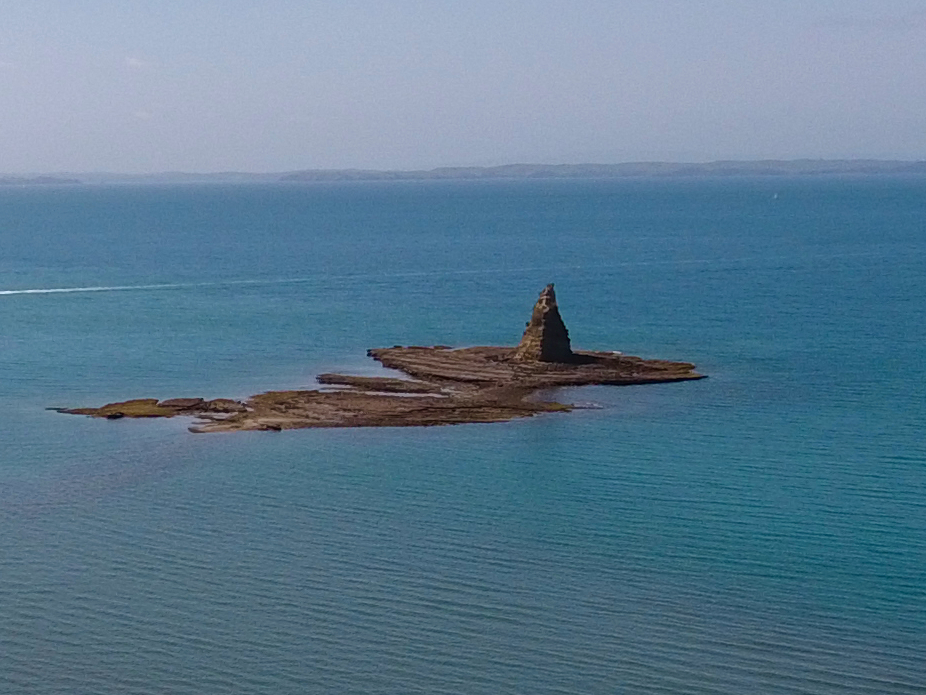
- Interactive map of Kotanui Island / Frenchmans Cap

Geography
- Location: Auckland Region
- Coordinates: 36°37′51″S 174°46′51″E

Administration
- New Zealand

Demographics
- Population: 0

Kotanui Island / Frenchmans Cap is a high rock stack island located off the southern coast of the Whangaparāoa Peninsula in New Zealand's Hauraki Gulf.

== Geography ==
The island is located south of the Whangaparāoa Peninsula, southeast of Matakatia Bay and southwest of Hobbs Bay / Gulf Harbour.

== Etymology ==
The island's Māori language name, Kotanui, literally means 'big cockle shell'. The island is also known as Kotanui Rock.

== History ==
New Zealand Anglican cleregyman John Kinder photographed Kotanui Island / Frenchmans Cap in 1868; the images have been described as being "among Kinder's most luminous photographs" by art curator Ron Brownson.

== Gallery ==
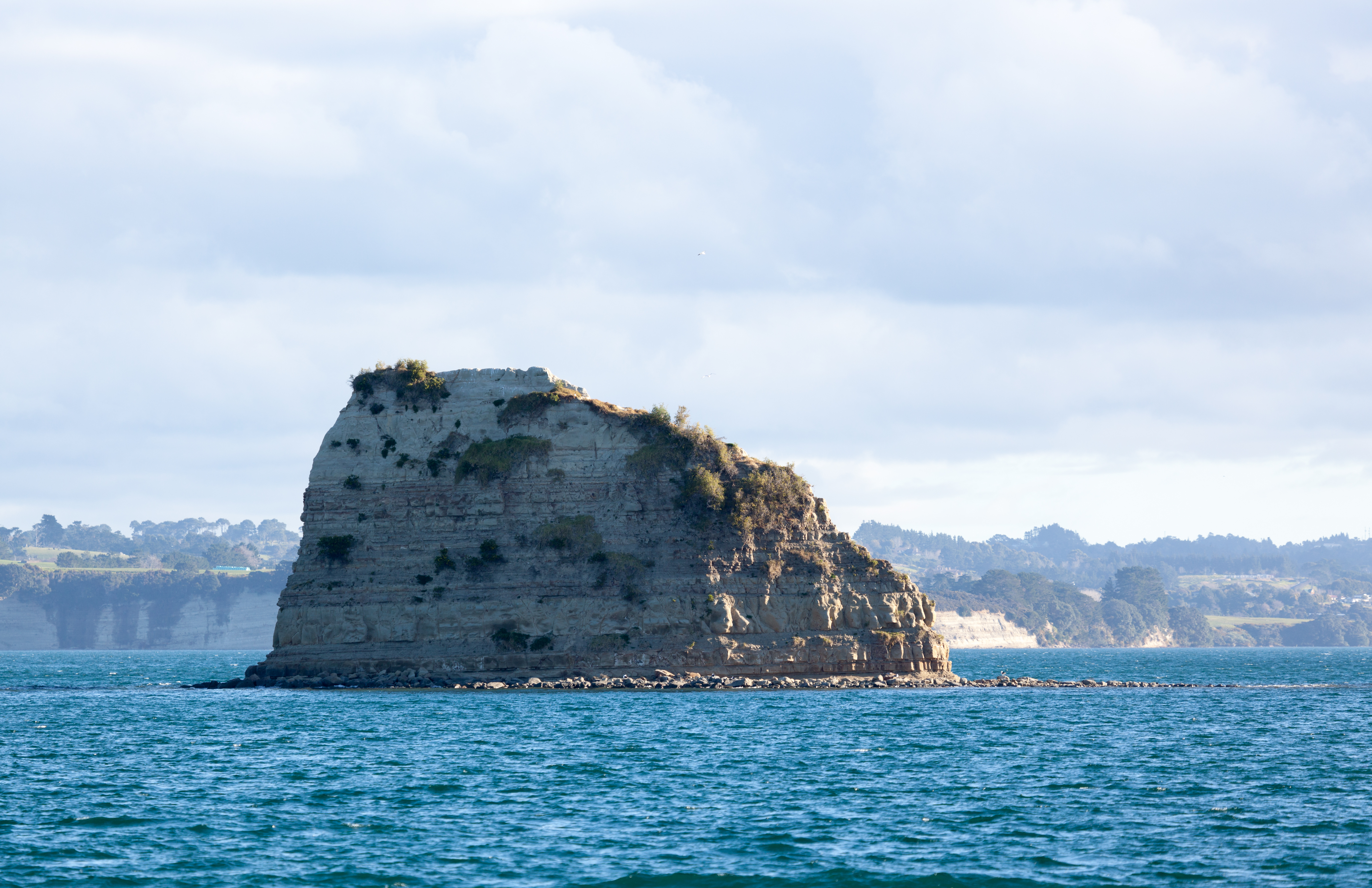
Kotanui Island / Frenchmans Cap seen from the south, 2011

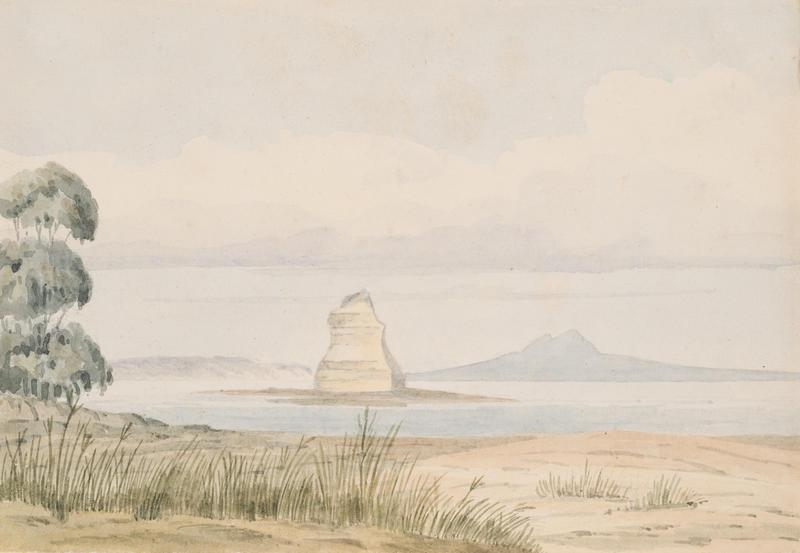
Watercolour painting by Edward Harker, c. 1848

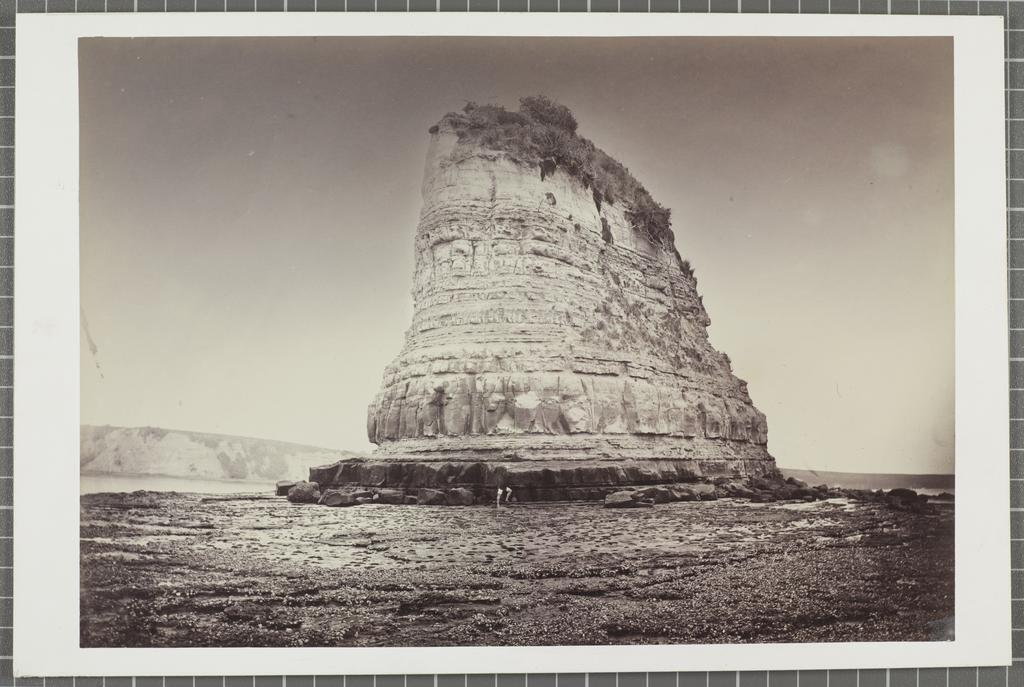
1868 photograph by John Kinder
