= Orewa College =

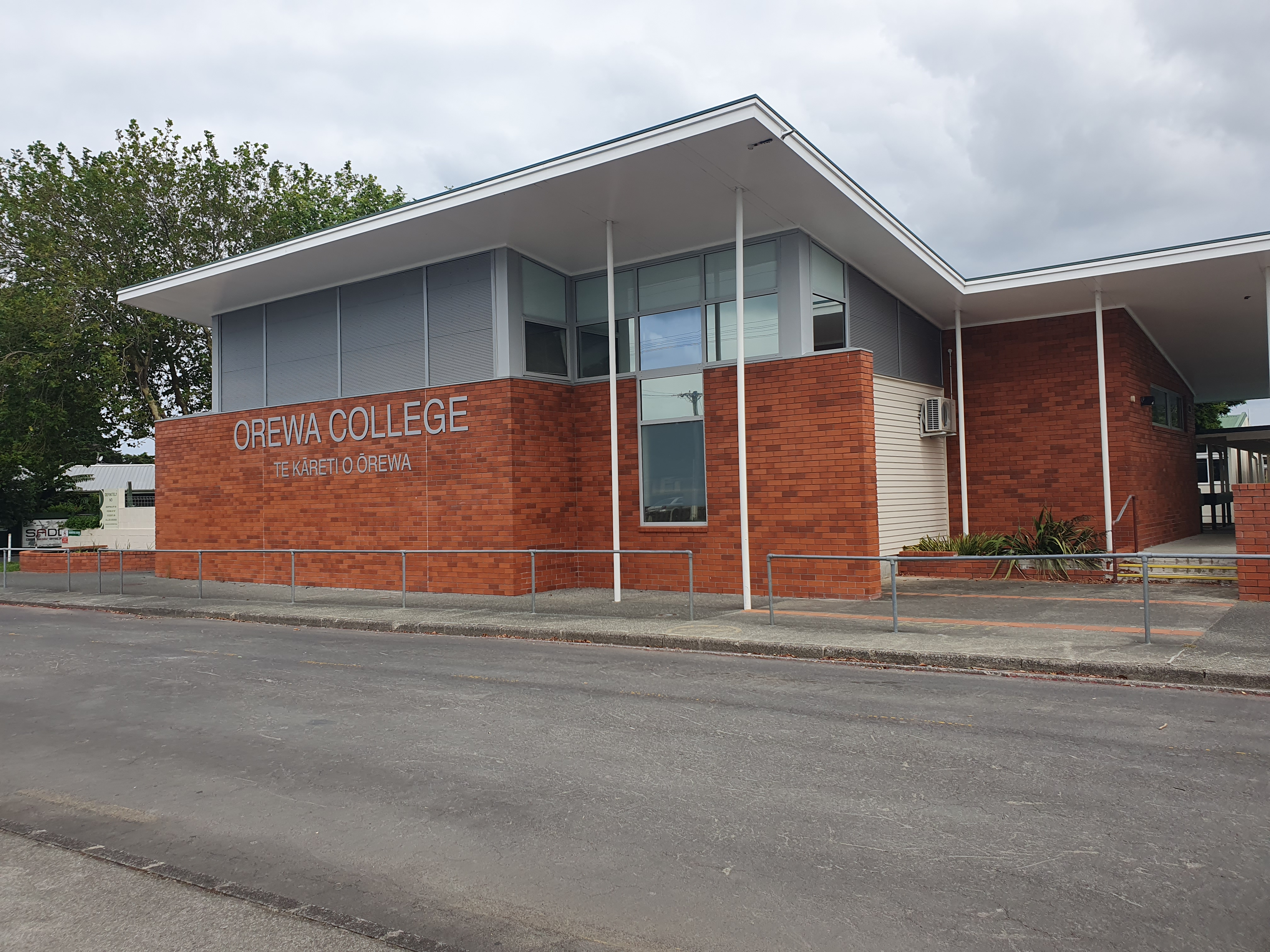

Location
- Riverside Road; Orewa 0931; New Zealand; 36.5929°S 174.6901°E

Information
- Funding type: State
- Motto: Towards enriched responsible citizenship.
- Established: 1956; 70 years ago
- Ministry of Education Institution no.: 25
- Principal: Wiri Warriner
- Years offered: 7–13
- Gender: coeducational
- Enrolment: 2,282 (July 2026)
- Color: Green
- Socio-economic decile: 9Q
- Website: www.orewacollege.nz

Orewa College is a state coeducational combined intermediate and secondary school located in Orewa, on the Hibiscus Coast north of Auckland, New Zealand. A total of 2,282 students from Years 7 to 13 (ages 10 to 18) attend the school as of July 2026.

== History ==
The school opened in 1956 as Orewa District High School with a roll of 101 students, a combined primary and secondary school. In 1974, the primary school was split off and the school became Orewa College. Originally Year 9 to 13 only, Year 7 and 8 were added in 2005.

On 24 June 2009, one of the school's coal-fired central heating boilers exploded while maintenance on the heating system was being carried out. The explosion blew the roof off the boiler house and shattered windows across the school. School caretaker Richard Nel received burns to 90 percent of his body and later died of his injuries in hospital. A contractor was also critically injured, receiving severe head injuries and burns to the abdomen and legs, but survived the accident. The school's board of trustees was subsequently charged under the Health and Safety in Employment Act 1992. They pleaded guilty to all charges at the court-case in April 2010, and were subsequently ordered to pay reparation and court costs totalling nearly $137,000.

== Enrolment ==
As of July 2026, Orewa College has a roll of 2,282 students, of which 315 (13.8%) identify as Māori.

As of 2026, the school has an Equity Index of 432, placing it amongst schools whose students have below average socioeconomic barriers to achievement (roughly equivalent to deciles 6 and 7 under the former socio-economic decile system).

=== International students ===
International students make up for around 20% of the school roll.

Germany and Japan have ongoing exchange programmes with the college - students stay from 3 months to 3 years.

Other international students are immigrants to New Zealand and their high volume reflects that of the Northern Auckland population of high foreign immigrants, mostly from Asian countries.

== Arts and Events Centre ==
Orewa College, along with the Rodney District Council decided to build a flexible, multi-use, modern auditorium and is now a valuable asset to the students and teachers of the college and the community.

The OAEC offers several areas which can be booked for commercial or community events, and has 450sqm of flat floor space, and a seating capacity of up to 700. The Auditorium includes full audio visual facilities including 2 projectors & screens, sound system with microphone and standard lighting. Stage and special effect lighting is available when hiring school technicians. The Auditorium also includes efficient heat pump & air conditioning units.

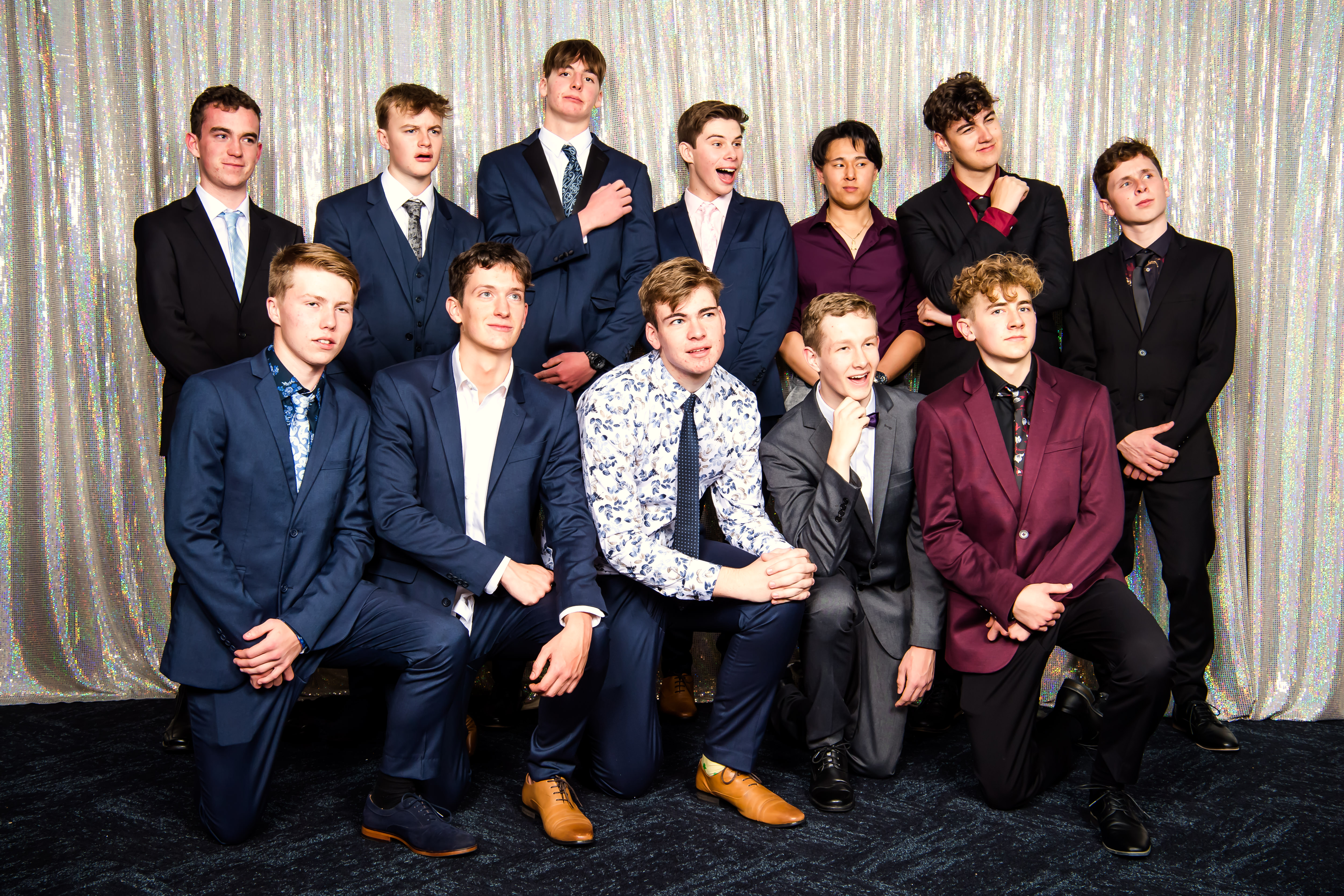
Orewa College students at the 2021 Orewa College Ball

== Notable alumni ==
- Ann Hartley – politician
- Shaun Johnson – rugby league player
- Tom Jordan, Scottish international rugby union player
- Fiona Pardington – photographic artist
- Kody Nielson, Ruban Nielson, Paul Roper, Michael Logie – musicians who formed The Mint Chicks
- Jay White- Professional Wrestler currently signed to All Elite Wrestling
- Jed Melvin- Professional rugby union player
- Cam Christie (rugby union)- Professional rugby union player currently signed to Blues (Super Rugby)
