= Rothesay Bay =

- Suburb
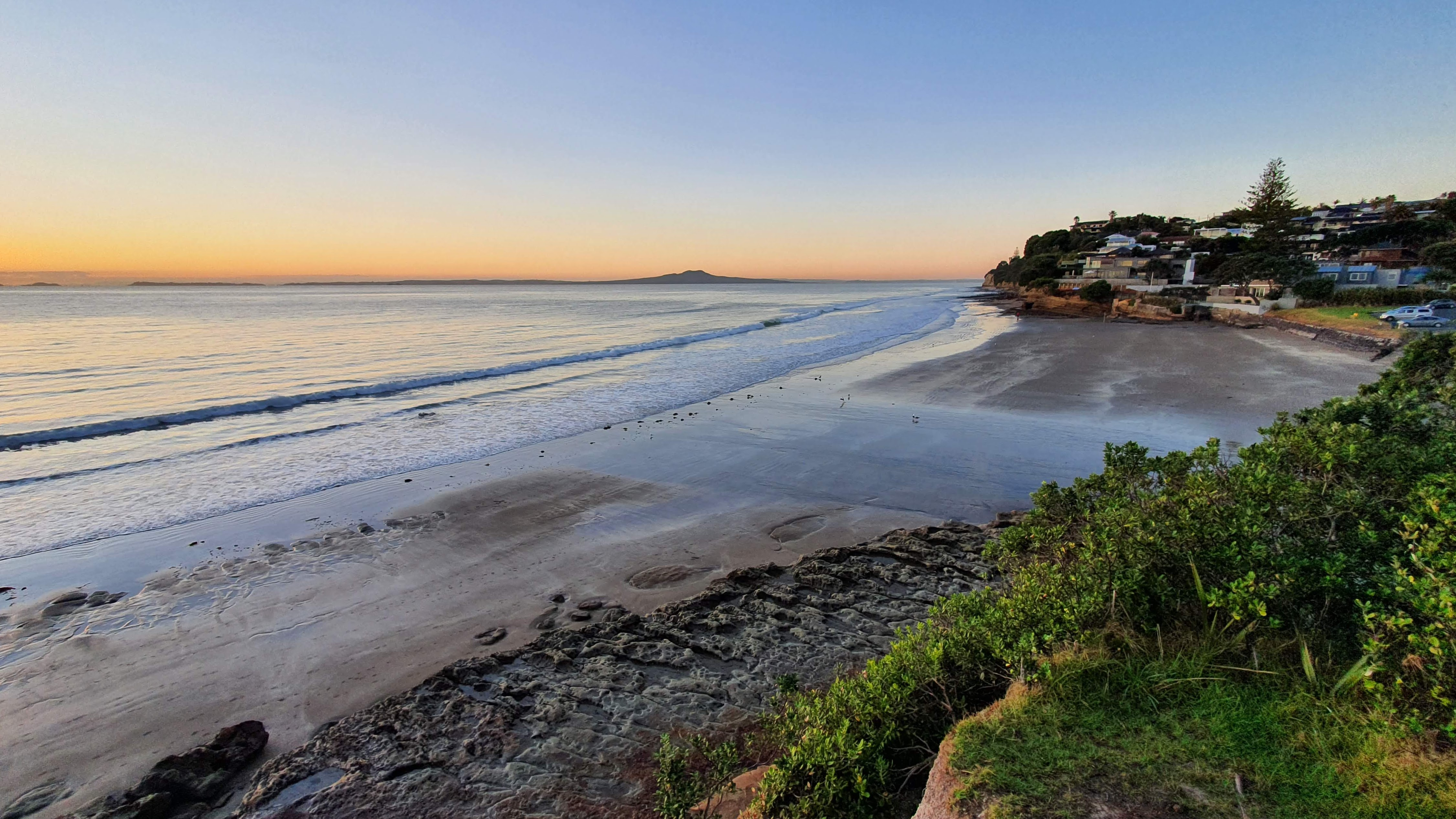
- The beach at Rothesay Bay at low tide, with the Hauraki Gulf and Rangitoto in the distance
- Interactive map of Rothesay Bay
- Coordinates: 36.721°S 174.751°E
- Country: New Zealand
- City: Auckland
- Local authority: Auckland Council
- Electoral ward: Albany ward
- Local board: Hibiscus and Bays Local Board

Area
  - Land: 86 ha (210 acres)

Population (June 2025)
  - Total: 3,010
  - Density: 3,500/km^{2} (9,100/sq mi)
- Postcode: 0630

Northcross	Browns Bay
Oteha	Rothesay Bay	(Hauraki Gulf)
Pinehill	Murrays Bay

Rothesay Bay is a small suburb in Auckland's East Coast Bays region. The suburb is roughly the same size as Murrays Bay, the suburb to the immediate south.

== Geography ==
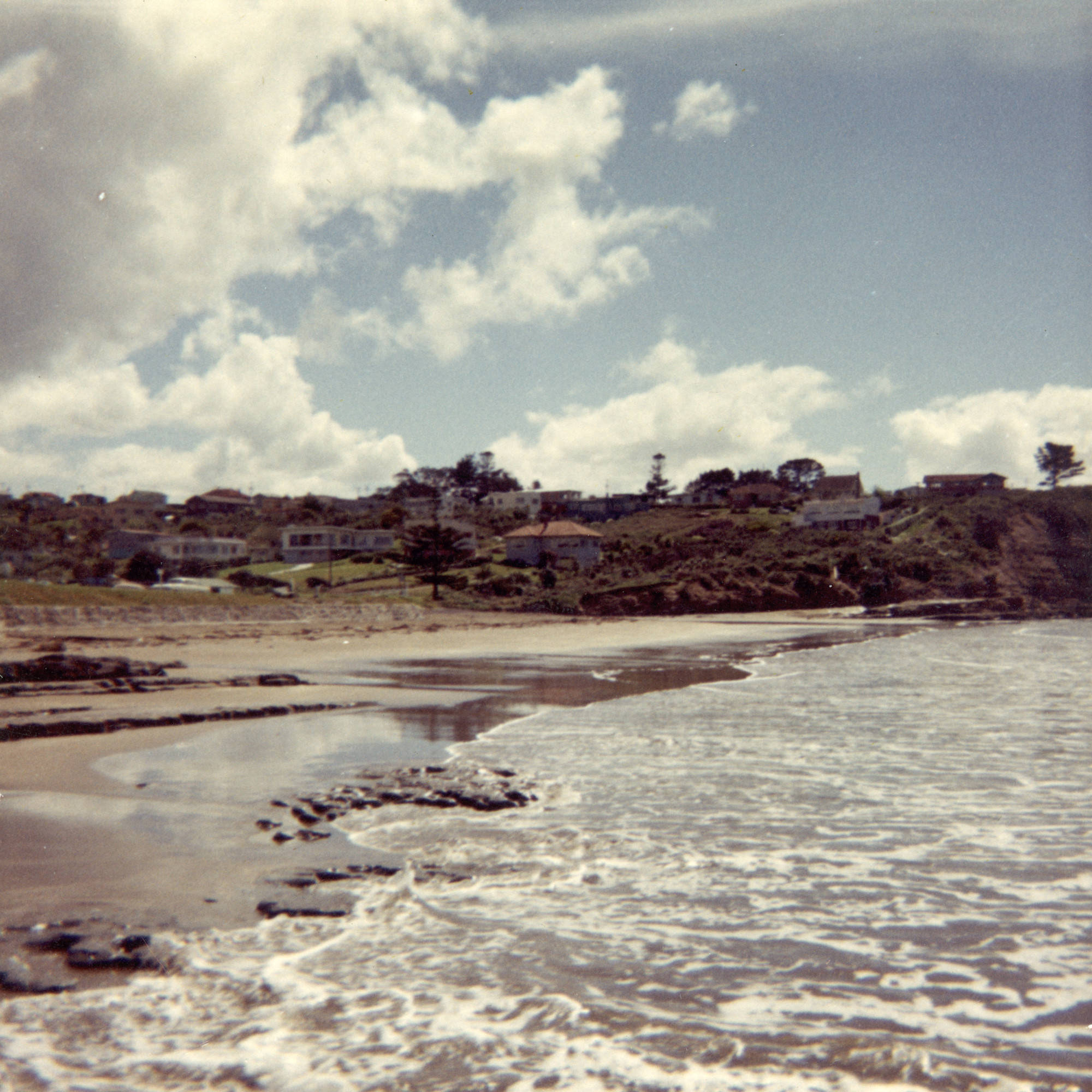
Rothesay Bay beach in 1963

Rothesay Bay is located in the East Coast Bays of the North Shore, between Browns Bay and Murrays Bay. The bay looks out to the Hauraki Gulf and Coromandel Peninsula. An unnamed stream flows north-east through the suburb to the Hauraki Gulf.

The soil is primarily formed from clay and Waitemata sandstone, which can be seen in the cliffs along the coast. Prior to human settlement, the inland Rothesay Bay area was primarily a northern broadleaf podocarp forest, dominated by tōtara, mataī, miro, kauri and kahikatea trees. Pōhutukawa trees were a major feature of the coastline. During the 19th century, the area was dominated by mānuka shrubs.

== History ==
=== Māori history ===
Māori settlement of the Auckland Region began around the 13th or 14th centuries. The North Shore was settled by Tāmaki Māori, including people descended from the Tainui migratory canoe and ancestors of figures such as Taikehu and Peretū. Many of the Tāmaki Māori people of the North Shore identified as Ngā Oho. While the poor soils around the East Coast Bays hindered dense settlement, traditional resources in the area included fish, shellfish and marine birds.

The warrior Maki migrated from the Kāwhia Harbour to his ancestral home in the Auckland Region, likely sometime in the 17th century. Maki conquered and unified many the Tāmaki Māori tribes as Te Kawerau ā Maki, including those of the North Shore. After Maki's death, his sons settled different areas of his lands, creating new hapū. His younger son Maraeariki settled the North Shore and Hibiscus Coast, who based himself at the head of the Ōrewa River. Maraeariki's daughter Kahu succeeded him, and she is the namesake of the North Shore, Te Whenua Roa o Kahu ("The Greater Lands of Kahu"), Many of the iwi of the North Shore, including Ngāti Manuhiri, Ngāti Maraeariki, Ngāti Kahu, Ngāti Poataniwha, Ngāi Tai Ki Tāmaki and Ngāti Whātua, can trace their lineage to Kahu.

By the 18th century, the Marutūāhu iwi Ngāti Paoa had expanded their influence to include the islands of the Hauraki Gulf and the North Shore. After periods of conflict, peace had been reached by the 1790s. The earliest contact with Europeans began in the late 18th century, which caused many Tāmaki Māori to die of rewharewha, respiratory diseases. During the early 1820s, most Māori of the North Shore fled for the Waikato or Northland due to the threat of war parties during the Musket Wars. Most people had returned by the late 1820s and 1830s.

=== European settlement ===
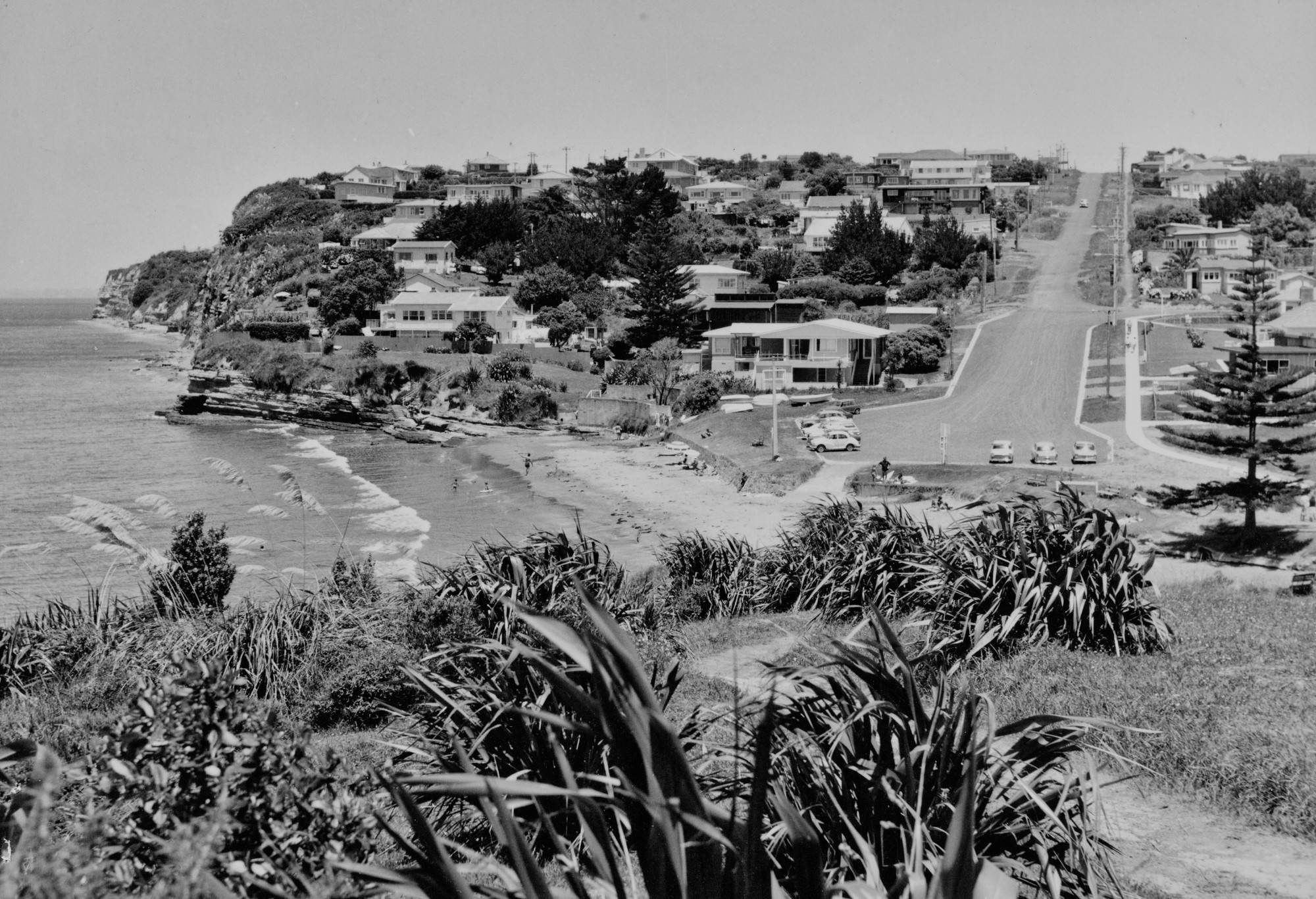
Rothesay Bay Beach circa 1968

In 1841, the Crown purchased the Mahurangi and Omaha blocks; an area that spanned from Takapuna to Te Ārai. The purchase involved some iwi with customary interests in the area, such as Ngāti Paoa, other Marutūāhu iwi and Ngāi Tai ki Tāmaki, but not others, such as Te Kawerau ā Maki or Ngāti Rango. The Crown spent until 1873 rectifying this sale, by making further deals with stakeholders.

Unlike the surrounding bays, most of Rothesay Bay was left as scrubland in the 19th century. The main visitors to the area were itinerant kauri gum diggers, and small sections of land were part of cattle farms owned by the Vaughan family and by W. Hart. In the 1910s, Scottish immigrant and resident of Albany, John Knight, began developing the land to sell as a subdivision. Construction on Rothesay Bay Road had begun by 1912, and the land was subdivided for sale in 1915 and 1916. While many historical sources describe Knight naming the subdivision after his hometown in Scotland, Knight did not come from Rothesay. The origin of the name is unknown, but it may have come from the Scottish song "Sweet Rothesay Bay", which was referenced in some of the advertising material for the suburb.

A small settlement of holiday homes developed during the 1920s, but even into the 1950s the area was sparsely populated and rural. By 1945, ten families had permanently settled at Rothesay Bay, and a close-knit community developed. The families used the Rothesay Bay beach as a common area to socialise. During World War II, a pillbox was installed at the Rothesay Bay Esplanade, and gun emplacements were constructed on the nearby cliffs.

== Local government ==
From 1876 until 1954, the area was administered by the Waitemata County, a large rural county north and west of the city of Auckland. In 1954, the area split from the county, forming the East Coast Bays Borough Council, which became East Coast Bays City in 1975. In 1989, the city was merged into the North Shore City. North Shore City was amalgamated into Auckland Council in November 2010.

Within the Auckland Council, Rothesay Bay is a part of the Hibiscus and Bays local government area governed by the Hibiscus and Bays Local Board. It is a part of the Albany ward, which elects two councillors to the Auckland Council.

== Demographics ==
Rothesay Bay covers 0.86 km^{2} (0.33 sq mi) and had an estimated population of 3,010 as of June 2025, with a population density of 3,500 people per km^{2}.

Historical population
Year	Pop.	±% p.a.
2006	2,613	—
2013	2,706	+0.50%
2018	2,886	+1.30%
2023	2,892	+0.04%

Rothesay Bay had a population of 2,892 in the 2023 New Zealand census, an increase of 6 people (0.2%) since the 2018 census, and an increase of 186 people (6.9%) since the 2013 census. There were 1,437 males, 1,452 females and 3 people of other genders in 993 dwellings. 2.3% of people identified as LGBTIQ+. The median age was 41.2 years (compared with 38.1 years nationally). There were 543 people (18.8%) aged under 15 years, 522 (18.0%) aged 15 to 29, 1,389 (48.0%) aged 30 to 64, and 441 (15.2%) aged 65 or older.

People could identify as more than one ethnicity. The results were 73.9% European (Pākehā); 4.5% Māori; 1.3% Pasifika; 24.4% Asian; 2.3% Middle Eastern, Latin American and African New Zealanders (MELAA); and 1.2% other, which includes people giving their ethnicity as "New Zealander". English was spoken by 95.4%, Māori language by 0.4%, Samoan by 0.2%, and other languages by 28.1%. No language could be spoken by 1.2% (e.g. too young to talk). New Zealand Sign Language was known by 0.2%. The percentage of people born overseas was 44.7, compared with 28.8% nationally.

Religious affiliations were 30.6% Christian, 0.5% Hindu, 0.7% Islam, 0.8% Buddhist, 0.3% New Age, 0.4% Jewish, and 0.6% other religions. People who answered that they had no religion were 60.4%, and 5.7% of people did not answer the census question.

Of those at least 15 years old, 702 (29.9%) people had a bachelor's or higher degree, 1,035 (44.1%) had a post-high school certificate or diploma, and 363 (15.5%) people exclusively held high school qualifications. The median income was $50,700, compared with $41,500 nationally. 543 people (23.1%) earned over $100,000 compared to 12.1% nationally. The employment status of those at least 15 was that 1,188 (50.6%) people were employed full-time, 408 (17.4%) were part-time, and 36 (1.5%) were unemployed.

== Amenities ==
A popular public walkway passes through coastal Rothesay Bay, connecting Campbells Bay to Browns Bay in the north. The walkway passes sections of exposed Waitemata sandstone.

== Notable residents ==
Chris Rankin who played Percy Weasley in the Harry Potter film series grew up in Rothesay Bay until he was 6 years old.

== Bibliography ==
- Cass, David (1989). ECB – the Years to 1989. East Coast Bays City Council.
- Sheehan, Vanessa (2019). An Almost Complete History of the East Coast Bays.
- Stone, R. C. J. (2001). From Tamaki-makau-rau to Auckland. Auckland University Press. ISBN 1869402596.
- Willis, Jenny (2018). Early History of East Coast Bays (Second ed.).
