= Mairangi Bay =

- Suburb
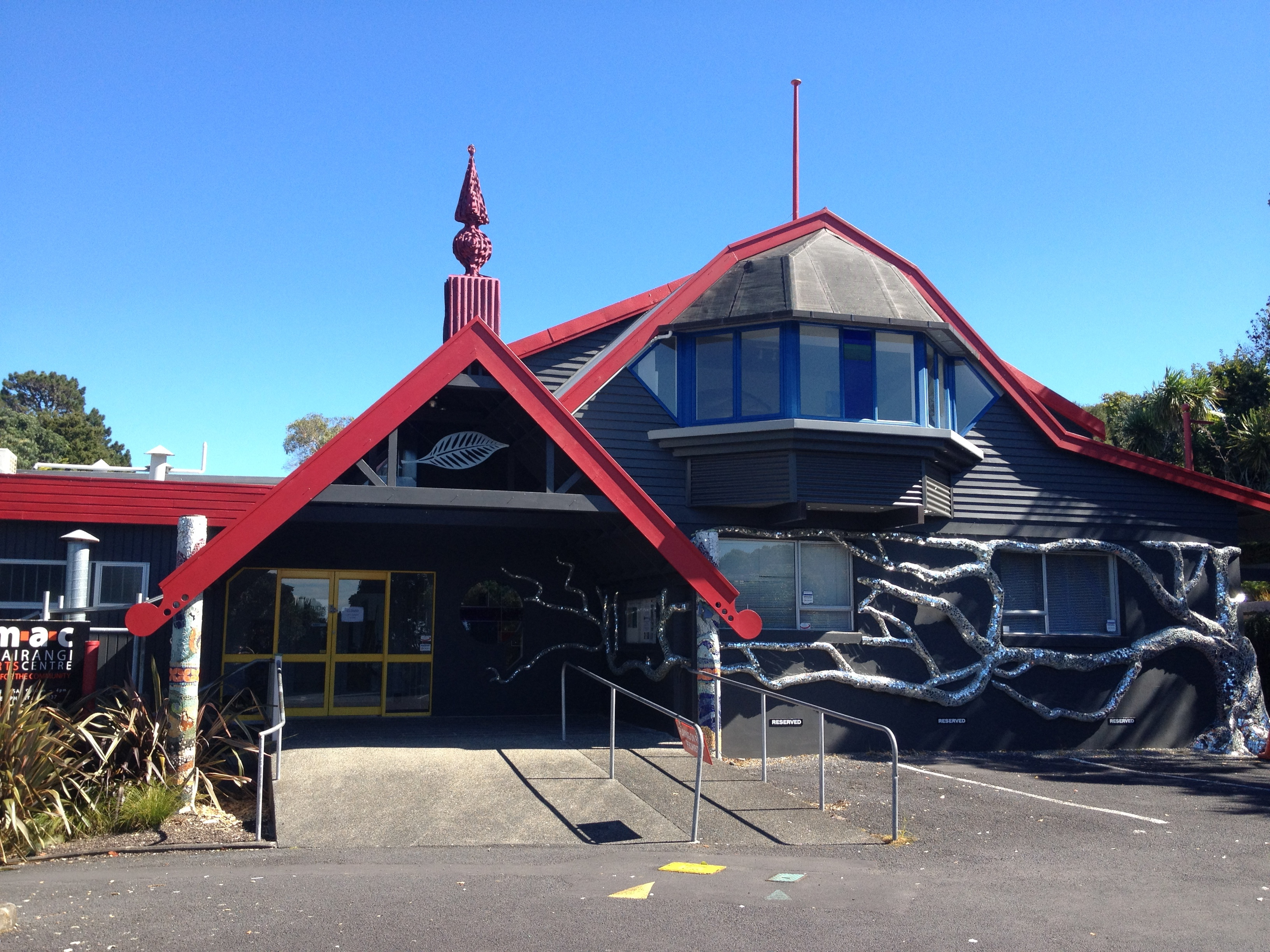
- Mairangi Arts Centre
- Interactive map of Mairangi Bay
- Coordinates: 36°44′19″S 174°44′54″E
- Country: New Zealand
- City: Auckland
- Local authority: Auckland Council
- Electoral ward: Albany ward
- Local board: Hibiscus and Bays

Area
  - Land: 173 ha (430 acres)

Population (June 2025)
  - Total: 6,100
  - Density: 3,500/km^{2} (9,100/sq mi)

Pinehill	Murrays Bay	(Hauraki Gulf)
Windsor Park	Mairangi Bay	(Hauraki Gulf)
Sunset North	Campbells Bay	Campbells Bay

Mairangi Bay (Māori: Te Whanga o Oho Mairangi) is a coastal suburb of North Shore, Auckland, located in the northern North Island of New Zealand, on the south-east-facing peninsula forming the northern side of the Waitematā Harbour. Mairangi Bay came under the local governance of the North Shore City Council until subsumed into the Auckland Council in 2010.

== Geography ==
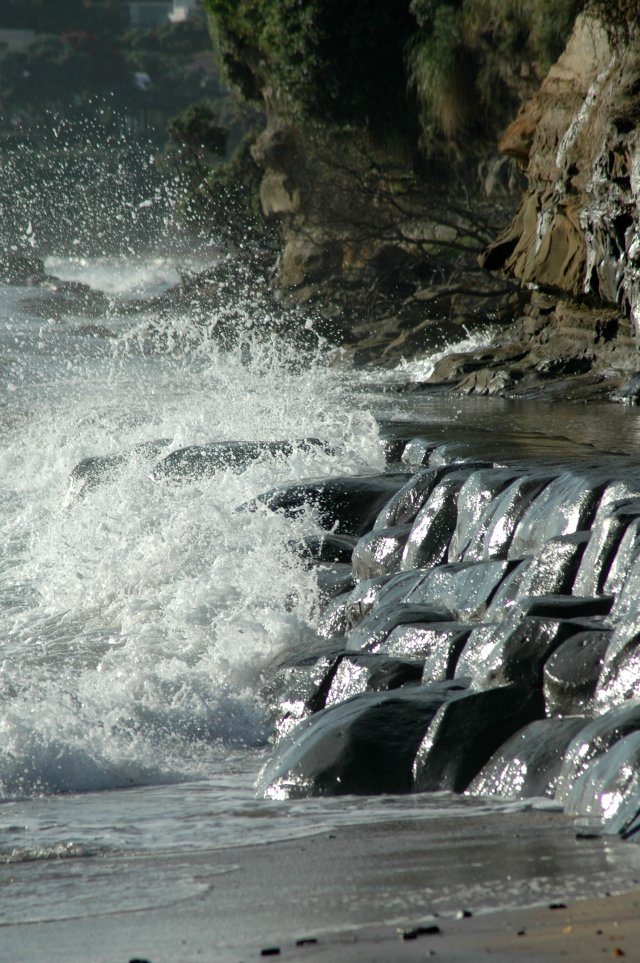
Waves crash onto the Mairangi Bay cliffs, formed from Waitemata Group sandstone

Mairangi Bay is located in the East Coast Bays of the North Shore, between Murrays Bay and Campbells Bay. The bay to the east shares the same name as the suburb.

The land is primarily formed from clay and Waitemata sandstone, which can be seen in the cliffs along the coast. Prior to human settlement, the inland Mairangi Bay area was primarily a northern broadleaf podocarp forest, dominated by tōtara, mataī, miro, kauri and kahikatea trees. Pōhutukawa trees were a major feature of the coastline.

== History ==
=== Māori history ===
Māori settlement of the Auckland Region began around the 13th or 14th centuries. The North Shore was settled by Tāmaki Māori, including people descended from the Tainui migratory canoe and ancestors of figures such as Taikehu and Peretū. Many of the Tāmaki Māori people of the North Shore identified as Ngā Oho. While the poor soils around the East Coast Bays hindered dense settlement, traditional resources in the area included fish, shellfish and marine birds, and kūmara is known to have been planted at Mairangi Bay. The traditional name for the coast between Murrays Bay and Campbells Bay is Waipapa. The modern name of the suburb comes from a locality name, Ōmairangi, a name which refers to an ancestor, Mairangi.

The warrior Maki migrated from the Kāwhia Harbour to his ancestral home in the Auckland Region, likely sometime in the 17th century. Maki conquered and unified many the Tāmaki Māori tribes as Te Kawerau ā Maki, including those of the North Shore. After Maki's death, his sons settled different areas of his lands, creating new hapū. His younger son Maraeariki settled the North Shore and Hibiscus Coast, who based himself at the head of the Ōrewa River. Maraeariki's daughter Kahu succeeded him, and she is the namesake of the North Shore, Te Whenua Roa o Kahu ("The Greater Lands of Kahu"). Many of the iwi of the North Shore, including Ngāti Manuhiri, Ngāti Maraeariki, Ngāti Kahu, Ngāti Poataniwha, Ngāi Tai Ki Tāmaki and Ngāti Whātua, can trace their lineage to Kahu.

By the 18th century, the Marutūāhu iwi Ngāti Paoa had expanded their influence to include the islands of the Hauraki Gulf and the North Shore. After periods of conflict, peace had been reached by the 1790s. The earliest contact with Europeans began in the late 18th century, which caused many Tāmaki Māori to die of rewharewha, respiratory diseases. During the early 1820s, most Māori of the North Shore fled for the Waikato or Northland due to the threat of war parties during the Musket Wars. Most people had returned by the late 1820s and 1830s.

=== European settlement ===
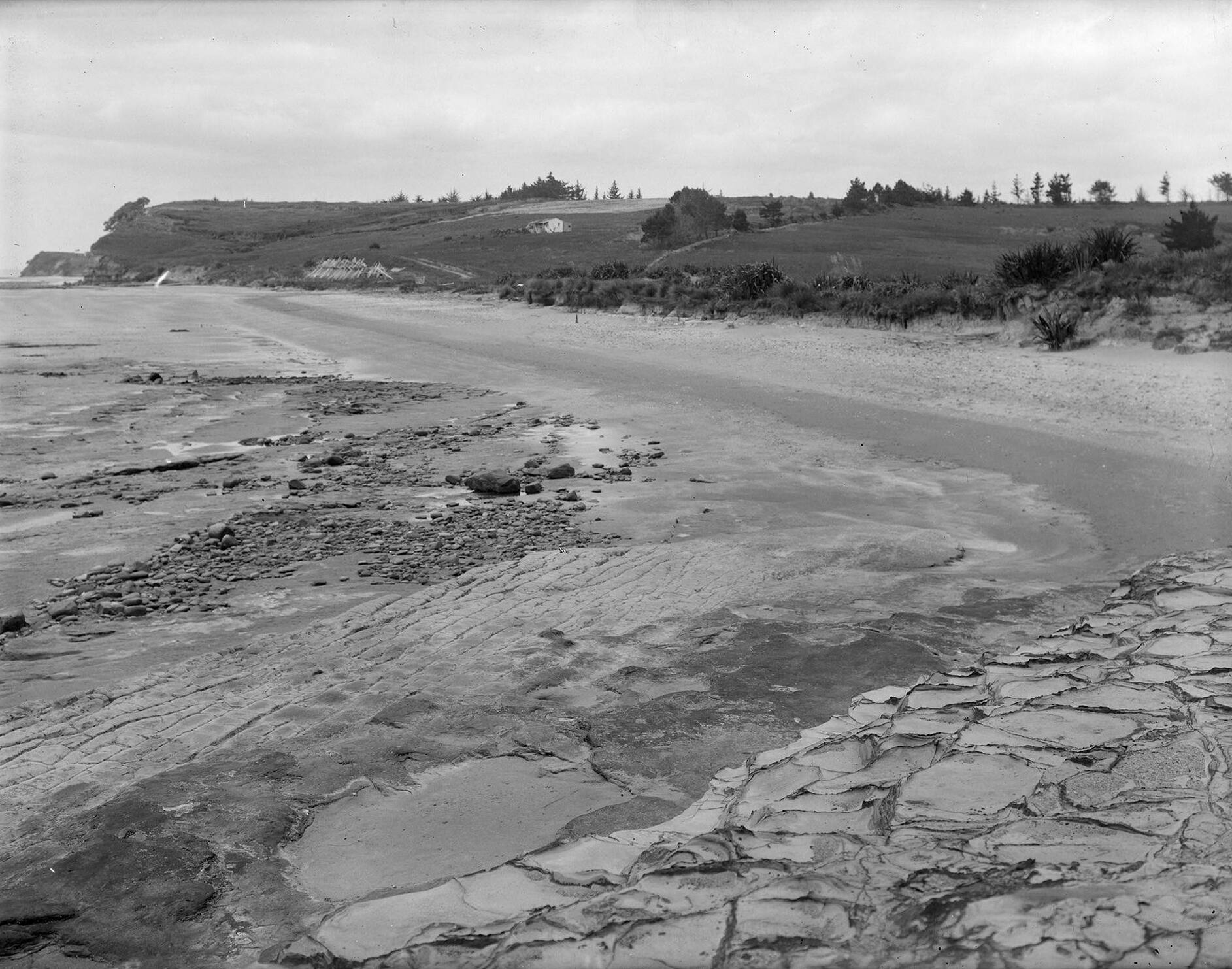
Mairangi Bay in 1912

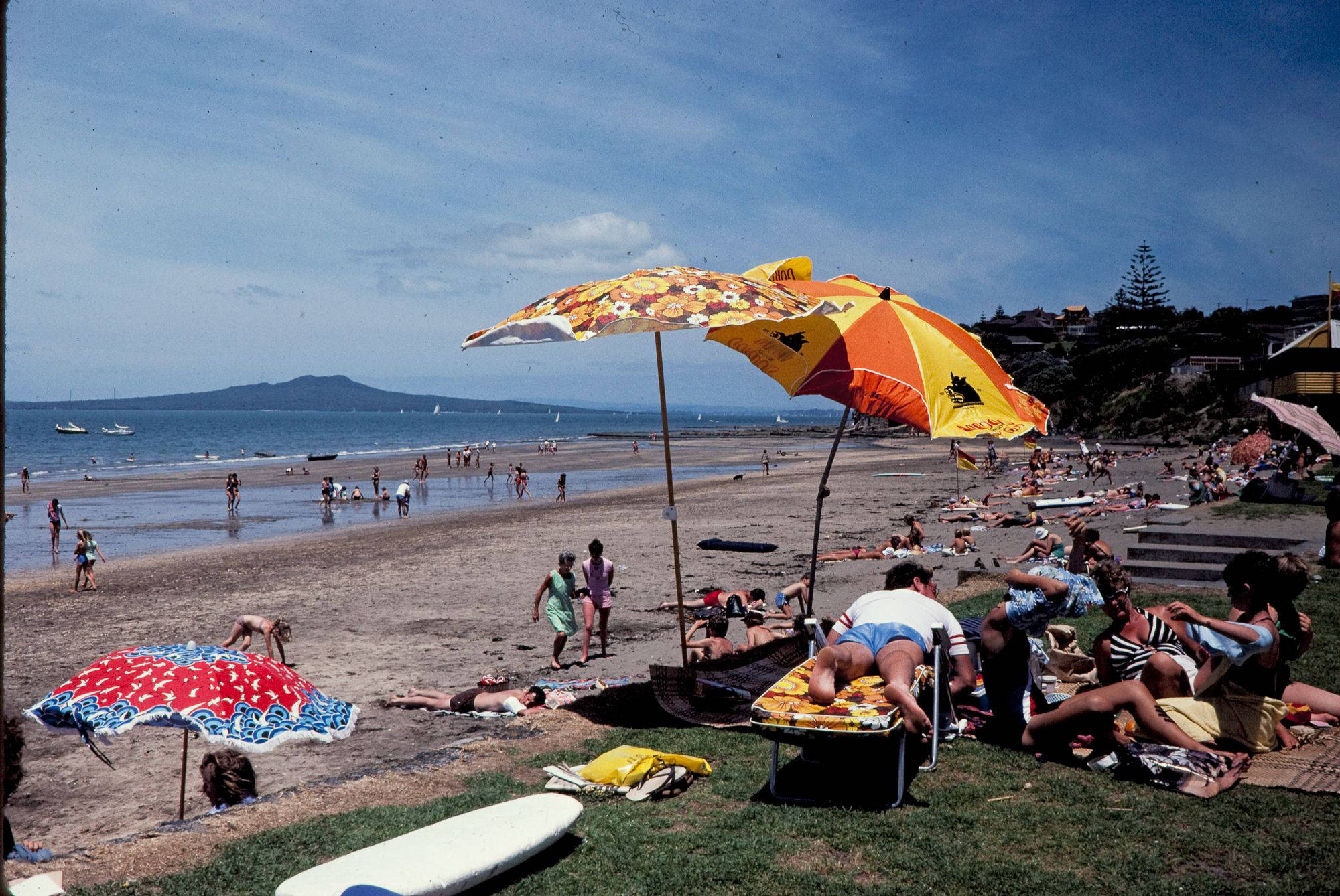
Beachgoers enjoying Mairangi Bay in the 1980s

In 1841, the Crown purchased the Mahurangi and Omaha blocks; an area that spanned from Takapuna to Te Ārai. The purchase involved some iwi with customary interests in the area, such as Ngāti Paoa, other Marutūāhu iwi and Ngāi Tai ki Tāmaki, but not others, such as Te Kawerau ā Maki or Ngāti Rango. The Crown spent until 1873 rectifying this sale, by making further deals with stakeholders.

In 1880, the land was sold to English settler Thomas Murray, from Newcastle upon Tyne, who converted the mānuka and harakeke scrubland to a sheep and cattle farm, and planted crops including corn, wheat and English grasses. Murray was a lifelong bachelor and devout Christian, who taught Sunday school classes in Takapuna. Murray's farm grew to 174 acres in size, and the bay became known as Little Murrays Bay (Big Murrays Bay was the name for Murrays Bay to the north). Murray sold kauri gum as an additional source of income, constructed a windmill at the site of modern-day Scarboro Terrace, and developed orchards to supply the Auckland market with fruit.

After Big Murrays Bay was renamed Murrays Bay in 1900, locals created petitions to suggest new names. A local solicitor, Mr. Rennie, suggested Awatea Bay, but the name Mairangi Bay, based on the Māori name Ōmairangi, was successful. Mairangi Bay was sold and subdivided in 1912. After the Murrays Bay Wharf was constructed in 1916, Mairangi Bay became a popular spot for holidays and day trippers from Auckland, who arrived by ferry. Housing developed in Mairangi Bay in the 1920s, primarily used as holiday homes. The Mairangi Bay post office opened in 1930, and the first shops and local services began operating from the 1930s and 1940s. During World War II, pillboxes were constructed at Mairangi Bay in various locations: at the beach, on the clifftops to the south of the suburb, in the modern-day Mairangi Bay School grounds, Elizabeth Place and on Kowhai Road. A searchlight emplacement was constructed at Whitby Crescent, as well as an anti-tank stone wall.

Suburban housing developed in Mairangi Bay after the opening of the Auckland Harbour Bridge in 1959, and the shops in Mairangi Bay were the first that opened for trading on Saturdays. The Mairangi War Memorial Hall was constructed in 1953 as a community hub, and in 1956, a new high school was opened in the suburb, Murray's Bay High School. Later renamed Rangitoto College, the school grew to become the largest high school in New Zealand. In 1966, the first supermarket in the East Coast Bays area was constructed at Mairangi Bay. In the late 1970s, industry developed in the area when the Takapuna City Council zoned a 70 acre industrial estate along Sunset Road, in modern-day Rosedale.

In 1991, the Mairangi War Memorial Hall was renovated and opened as the Mairangi Arts Centre. Since 2004, Mairangi Bay and the adjacent beaches have undergone civil works projects since 2004 to improve stormwater management.

== Local government ==
From 1876 until 1954, the area was administered by the Waitemata County, a large rural county north and west of the city of Auckland. In 1954, the area split from the county, forming the East Coast Bays Borough Council, which became East Coast Bays City in 1975. In 1989, the city was merged into the North Shore City. North Shore City was amalgamated into Auckland Council in November 2010.

Within the Auckland Council, Mairangi Bay is a part of the Hibiscus and Bays local government area governed by the Hibiscus and Bays Local Board. It is a part of the Albany ward, which elects two councillors to the Auckland Council.

== Demographics ==
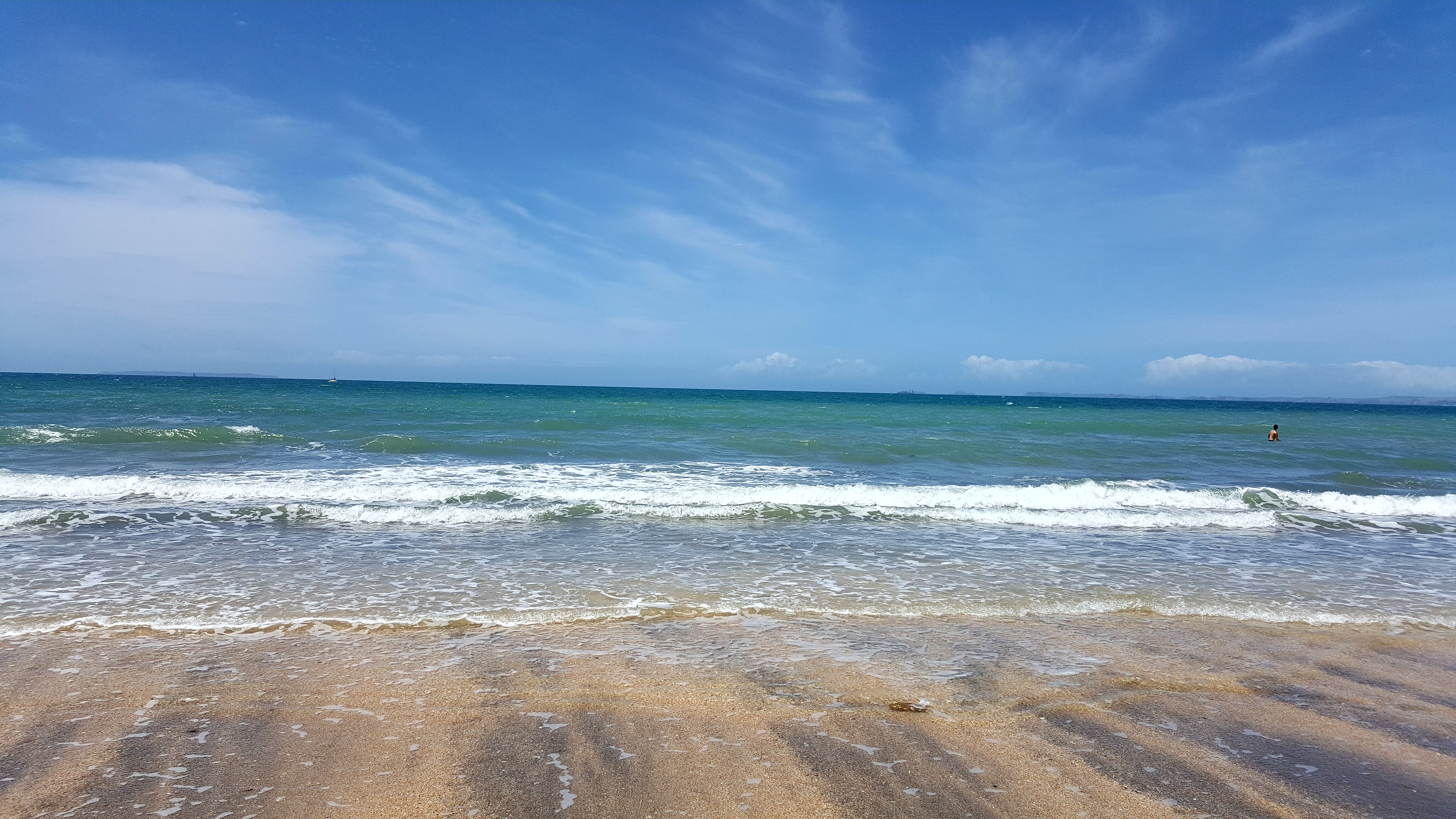
The Mairangi Bay beach

Mairangi Bay covers 1.73 km^{2} (0.67 sq mi) and had an estimated population of 6,100 as of June 2025, with a population density of 3,526 people per km^{2}.

Historical population
Year	Pop.	±% p.a.
2006	5,277	—
2013	5,349	+0.19%
2018	5,646	+1.09%
2023	5,832	+0.65%

Mairangi Bay had a population of 5,832 in the 2023 New Zealand census, an increase of 186 people (3.3%) since the 2018 census, and an increase of 483 people (9.0%) since the 2013 census. There were 2,853 males, 2,964 females and 15 people of other genders in 1,899 dwellings. 3.1% of people identified as LGBTIQ+. The median age was 40.9 years (compared with 38.1 years nationally). There were 1,062 people (18.2%) aged under 15 years, 1,137 (19.5%) aged 15 to 29, 2,634 (45.2%) aged 30 to 64, and 999 (17.1%) aged 65 or older.

People could identify as more than one ethnicity. The results were 65.3% European (Pākehā); 5.6% Māori; 2.1% Pasifika; 31.3% Asian; 2.6% Middle Eastern, Latin American and African New Zealanders (MELAA); and 1.6% other, which includes people giving their ethnicity as "New Zealander". English was spoken by 92.7%, Māori language by 0.7%, Samoan by 0.2%, and other languages by 32.0%. No language could be spoken by 1.6% (e.g. too young to talk). New Zealand Sign Language was known by 0.2%. The percentage of people born overseas was 46.7, compared with 28.8% nationally.

Religious affiliations were 31.6% Christian, 0.9% Hindu, 0.7% Islam, 0.1% Māori religious beliefs, 1.3% Buddhist, 0.3% New Age, 0.3% Jewish, and 0.9% other religions. People who answered that they had no religion were 56.8%, and 7.1% of people did not answer the census question.

Of those at least 15 years old, 1,452 (30.4%) people had a bachelor's or higher degree, 1,971 (41.3%) had a post-high school certificate or diploma, and 921 (19.3%) people exclusively held high school qualifications. The median income was $46,800, compared with $41,500 nationally. 966 people (20.3%) earned over $100,000 compared to 12.1% nationally. The employment status of those at least 15 was that 2,367 (49.6%) people were employed full-time, 762 (16.0%) were part-time, and 132 (2.8%) were unemployed.

Individual statistical areas
Name	Area (km^{2})	Population	Density (per km^{2})	Dwellings	Median age	Median income
Mairangi Bay North	0.92	2,955	3,212	966	40.9 years	$44,800
Mairangi Bay South	0.80	2,877	3,596	930	40.9 years	$49,000
New Zealand					38.1 years	$41,500

== Education ==
Mairangi Bay School and St John's School are coeducational contributing primary (years 1-6) schools with rolls of 446 and 303 respectively as at July 2026. Mairangi Bay School was founded in 1967. St John's is a state integrated Catholic School, which was founded in 1961.

Rangitoto College is a large secondary school in Windsor Park, to the west of Mairangi Bay.

== Amenities ==
A popular public walkway passes through coastal Mairangi Bay, connecting Campbells Bay to Browns Bay in the north. The walkway passes sections of exposed Waitemata sandstone.

Mairangi Bay is also home to the Mairangi Bay Surf Lifesaving Club, which patrols the surrounding beaches.

== Bibliography ==
- Cass, David (1989). ECB – the Years to 1989. East Coast Bays City Council.
- Stone, R. C. J. (2001). From Tamaki-makau-rau to Auckland. Auckland University Press. ISBN 1869402596.
- Verran, David (2010), The North Shore: An Illustrated History, North Shore: Random House, OL 33434370W, Wikidata Q120520385
- Willis, Jenny (2018). Early History of East Coast Bays (Second ed.).
