= Murrays Bay =

- Suburb
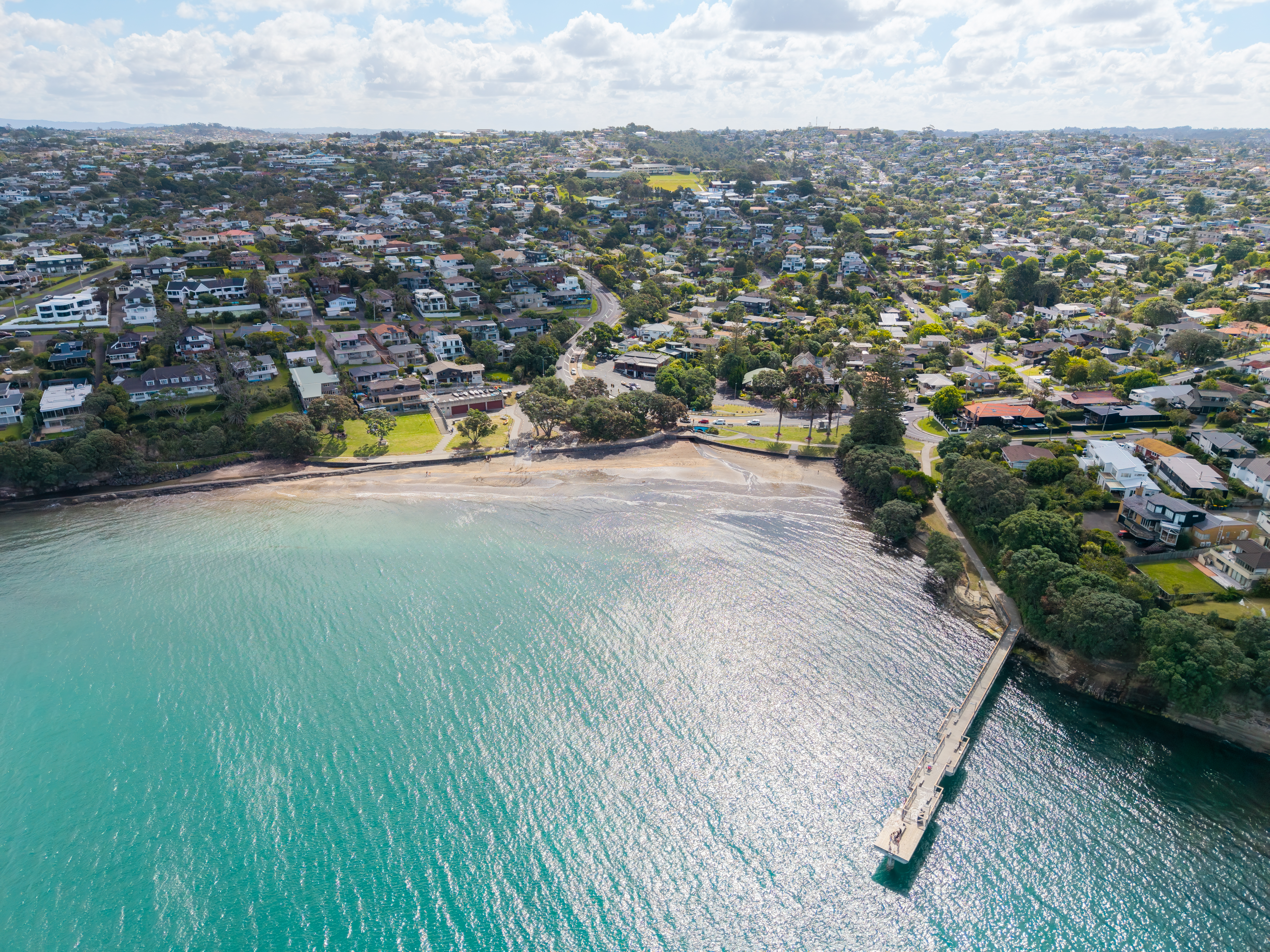
- Murrays Bay from the air
- Interactive map of Murrays Bay
- Coordinates: 36.730317°S 174.748519°E
- Country: New Zealand
- City: Auckland
- Local authority: Auckland Council
- Electoral ward: Albany ward
- Local board: Hibiscus and Bays
- Established: 1880

Area
  - Land: 166 ha (410 acres)

Population (June 2025)
  - Total: 5,140
  - Density: 3,100/km^{2} (8,020/sq mi)
- Postcode: 0630

Northcross	Rothesay Bay	(Hauraki Gulf)
Pinehill	Murrays Bay	(Hauraki Gulf)
Windsor Park	Mairangi Bay	(Hauraki Gulf)

Murrays Bay is a small suburb in the East Coast Bays region, located in the North Shore of Auckland. The suburb is roughly the same size as Rothesay Bay, the suburb to the immediate north. It is primarily a residential area but does have a community centre, restaurant and café. Murrays Bay is regularly serviced by buses which go to Takapuna and the Auckland city centre.

== Geography ==
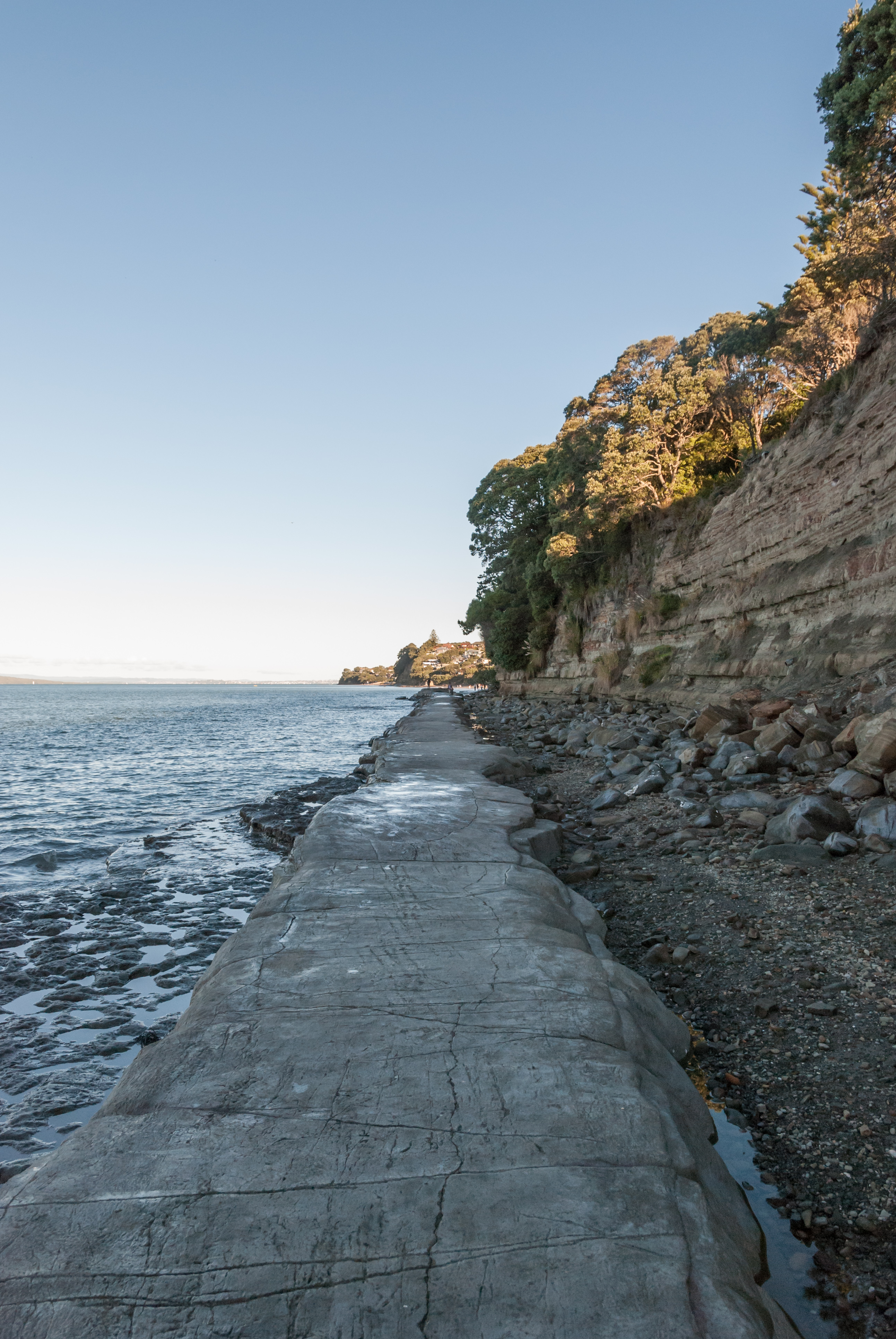
Waitemata Group sandstone cliffs at Murrays Bay

Murrays Bay is located in the East Coast Bays of the North Shore, between Rothesay Bay and Mairangi Bay. The bay itself is located between Tatarata Point, the headland to the east, and Mairangi Bay to the south. A stream runs eastwards through the suburb, called the Taiorahi Creek.

The land is primarily formed from clay and Waitemata sandstone, which can be seen in the cliffs along the coast. Prior to human settlement, the inland Murrays Bay area was primarily a northern broadleaf podocarp forest, dominated by tōtara, mataī, miro, kauri and kahikatea trees. Pōhutukawa trees were a major feature of the coastline. During the 19th century, the area was dominated by mānuka shrubland and harakeke flax.

== History ==
=== Māori history ===
Māori settlement of the Auckland Region began around the 13th or 14th centuries. The North Shore was settled by Tāmaki Māori, including people descended from the Tainui migratory canoe and ancestors of figures such as Taikehu and Peretū. Many of the Tāmaki Māori people of the North Shore identified as Ngā Oho. While the poor soils around the East Coast Bays hindered dense settlement, traditional resources in the area included fish, shellfish and marine birds. The traditional name for the coast between Murrays Bay and Campbells Bay is Waipapa.

The warrior Maki migrated from the Kāwhia Harbour to his ancestral home in the Auckland Region, likely sometime in the 17th century. Maki conquered and unified many the Tāmaki Māori tribes as Te Kawerau ā Maki, including those of the North Shore. After Maki's death, his sons settled different areas of his lands, creating new hapū. His younger son Maraeariki settled the North Shore and Hibiscus Coast, who based himself at the head of the Ōrewa River. Maraeariki's daughter Kahu succeeded him, and she is the namesake of the North Shore, Te Whenua Roa o Kahu ("The Greater Lands of Kahu"). Many of the iwi of the North Shore, including Ngāti Manuhiri, Ngāti Maraeariki, Ngāti Kahu, Ngāti Poataniwha, Ngāi Tai Ki Tāmaki and Ngāti Whātua, can trace their lineage to Kahu.

By the 18th century, the Marutūāhu iwi Ngāti Paoa had expanded their influence to include the islands of the Hauraki Gulf and the North Shore. After periods of conflict, peace had been reached by the 1790s. The earliest contact with Europeans began in the late 18th century, which caused many Tāmaki Māori to die of rewharewha, respiratory diseases. During the early 1820s, most Māori of the North Shore fled for the Waikato or Northland due to the threat of war parties during the Musket Wars. Most people had returned by the late 1820s and 1830s.

=== European settlement ===
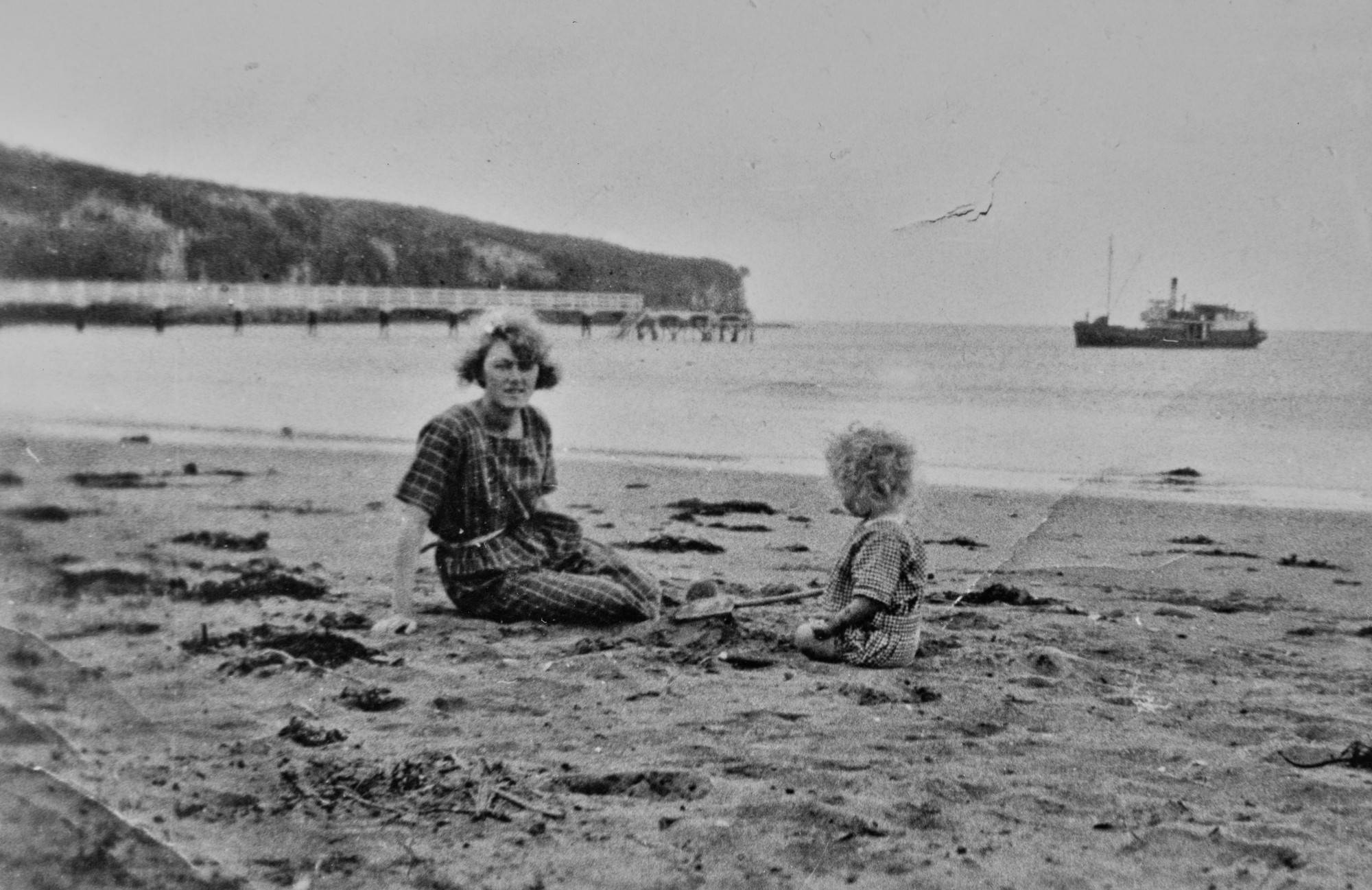
A holidayer at Murrays Bay beach in 1922. The Murrays Bay Wharf and the steamship Omana can be seen in the background

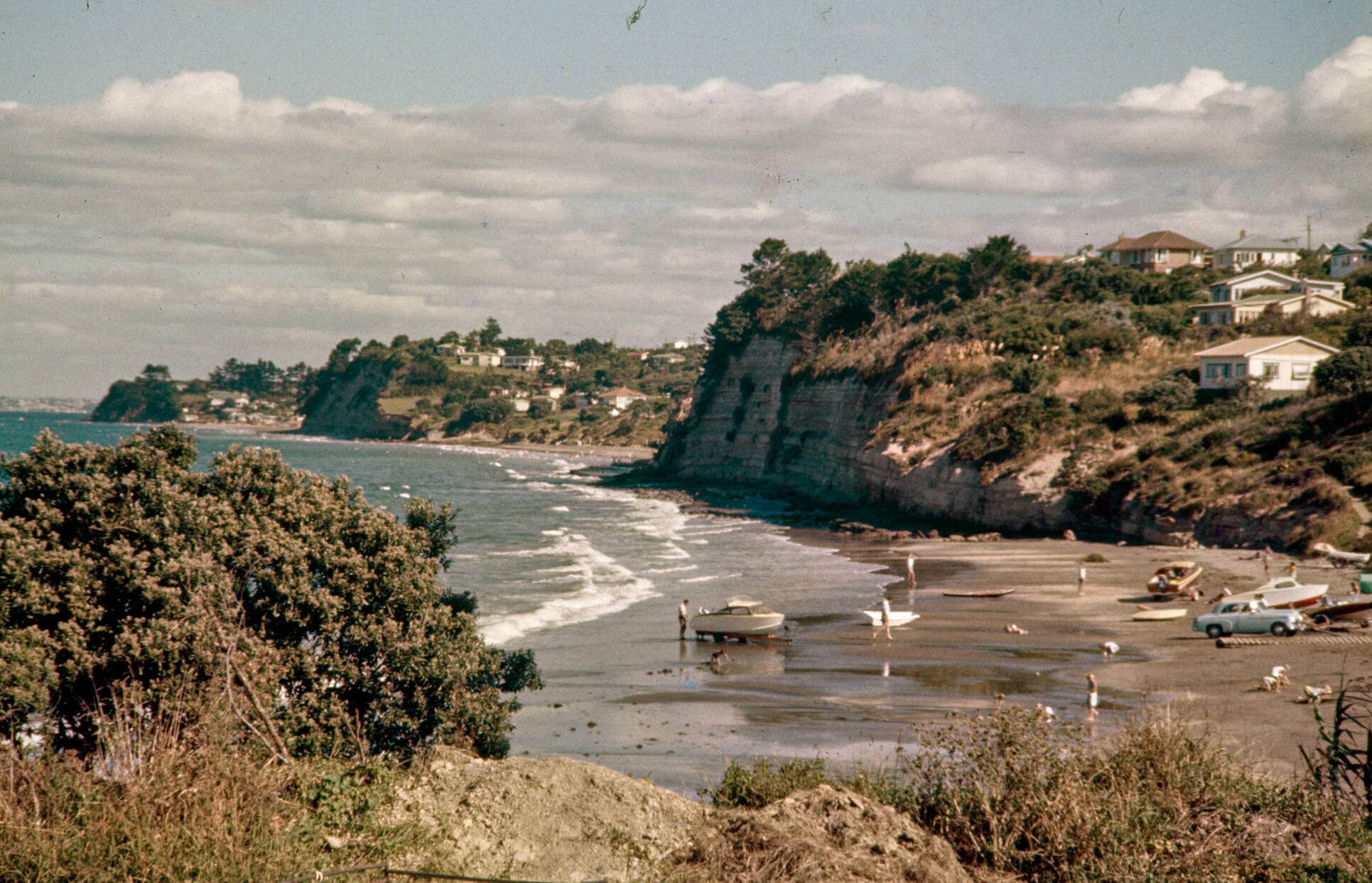
Boats and cars at Murrays Bay beach in the 1960s

In 1841, the Crown purchased the Mahurangi and Omaha blocks; an area that spanned from Takapuna to Te Ārai. The purchase involved some iwi with customary interests in the area, such as Ngāti Paoa, other Marutūāhu iwi and Ngāi Tai ki Tāmaki, but not others, such as Te Kawerau ā Maki or Ngāti Rango. The Crown spent until 1873 rectifying this sale, by making further deals with stakeholders.

The first Europeans to come to Murrays Bay were itinerant kauri gum diggers in the mid-19th century. Murrays Bay was the site of one of the largest gum diggers camps in the North Shore. The area was known as Tommy's Bay, after the Māori owner of the land. In 1880, the land was sold to English settler Thomas Murray, from Newcastle upon Tyne, who converted the mānuka and harakeke scrubland to a sheep and cattle farm, and planted crops including corn, wheat and English grasses. Murray was a lifelong bachelor and devout Christian, who taught Sunday school classes in Takapuna. Murray's farm grew to 174 acres in size, and the bay became known as Big Murrays Bay (Little Murrays Bay was the name for Mairangi Bay to the south). Murray sold kauri gum as an additional source of income, constructed a windmill at the site of modern-day Scarboro Terrace, and developed orchards to supply the Auckland market with fruit.

In 1910, the name for the area was changed from Big Murrays Bay to Murrays Bay. The area was subdivided and sold in 1912. After the Murrays Bay Wharf was constructed in 1916, the area became a popular spot for holidays and day trippers from Auckland, who arrived by ferry. Housing began to be built shortly after the area was subdivided, but due to the outbreak of World War I, construction was paused for five years. By 1920, holiday homes had been constructed at Murrays Bay, and in 1926 two shops had opened in the suburb. In the 1930s, Murrays Bay became a refuge for children during the polio epidemic. During World War II, pillboxes were constructed at Murrays Bay, at the beach and on the clifftops to the north of the suburb.

The suburb grew in the 1950s, after World War II. In 1956, a new high school was opened in the suburb, Murray's Bay High School. Later renamed Rangitoto College, the school grew to become the largest high school in New Zealand. In 1958, the Murrays Bay Sailing Club was founded, and in 1973 the old Murrays Bay wharf was replaced.

== Local government ==
From 1876 until 1954, the area was administered by the Waitemata County, a large rural county north and west of the city of Auckland. In 1954, the area split from the county, forming the East Coast Bays Borough Council, which became East Coast Bays City in 1975. In 1989, the city was merged into the North Shore City. North Shore City was amalgamated into Auckland Council in November 2010.

Within the Auckland Council, Murrays Bay is a part of the Hibiscus and Bays local government area governed by the Hibiscus and Bays Local Board. It is a part of the Albany ward, which elects two councillors to the Auckland Council.

== Demographics ==
Murrays Bay covers 1.66 km^{2} (0.64 sq mi) and had an estimated population of 5,140 as of June 2025, with a population density of 3,096 people per km^{2}.

Historical population
Year	Pop.	±% p.a.
2006	4,581	—
2013	4,704	+0.38%
2018	4,761	+0.24%
2023	4,872	+0.46%

Murrays Bay had a population of 4,872 in the 2023 New Zealand census, an increase of 111 people (2.3%) since the 2018 census, and an increase of 168 people (3.6%) since the 2013 census. There were 2,418 males, 2,439 females and 18 people of other genders in 1,602 dwellings. 2.6% of people identified as LGBTIQ+. The median age was 40.9 years (compared with 38.1 years nationally). There were 987 people (20.3%) aged under 15 years, 783 (16.1%) aged 15 to 29, 2,334 (47.9%) aged 30 to 64, and 771 (15.8%) aged 65 or older.

People could identify as more than one ethnicity. The results were 63.4% European (Pākehā); 5.5% Māori; 1.6% Pasifika; 34.2% Asian; 2.5% Middle Eastern, Latin American and African New Zealanders (MELAA); and 1.8% other, which includes people giving their ethnicity as "New Zealander". English was spoken by 92.1%, Māori language by 0.7%, Samoan by 0.2%, and other languages by 33.7%. No language could be spoken by 1.7% (e.g. too young to talk). New Zealand Sign Language was known by 0.2%. The percentage of people born overseas was 49.0, compared with 28.8% nationally.

Religious affiliations were 28.2% Christian, 1.5% Hindu, 0.6% Islam, 0.1% Māori religious beliefs, 1.6% Buddhist, 0.4% New Age, 0.2% Jewish, and 1.0% other religions. People who answered that they had no religion were 60.3%, and 6.3% of people did not answer the census question.

Of those at least 15 years old, 1,242 (32.0%) people had a bachelor's or higher degree, 1,599 (41.2%) had a post-high school certificate or diploma, and 696 (17.9%) people exclusively held high school qualifications. The median income was $49,000, compared with $41,500 nationally. 840 people (21.6%) earned over $100,000 compared to 12.1% nationally. The employment status of those at least 15 was that 1,911 (49.2%) people were employed full-time, 630 (16.2%) were part-time, and 75 (1.9%) were unemployed.

Individual statistical areas
Name	Area (km^{2})	Population	Density (per km^{2})	Dwellings	Median age	Median income
Murrays Bay West	0.96	2,634	2,744	837	40.0 years	$46,200
Murrays Bay East	0.70	2,238	3,197	765	42.6 years	$52,000
New Zealand					38.1 years	$41,500

== Amenities ==
Murrays Bay Beach Reserve is located adjacent to the beach and features a playground, picnic tables, and public toilets with changing rooms and outdoor showers. The reserve also houses the Murrays Bay Sailing Club, which provides facilities for dinghy sailing, boat storage, and junior sailing programs. Local dining options near the beachfront include the Italian restaurant La Spiaggia.

The Murrays Bay Wharf serves as a popular recreational spot for fishing and jumping (known locally as "bombing") during the summer months. It is equipped with ladders for swimmers to exit the water.

The beach acts as a connecting point for two coastal walkways. To the north, the "Murrays to Rothesay Bay Path" is a clifftop walk offering views of the Hauraki Gulf. To the south, a coastal pipeline walkway connects Murrays Bay to Mairangi Bay, which is accessible during low tide.

== Education ==
Murrays Bay School is a contributing primary (years 1–6) school with a roll of 718 students as at July 2026, Murrays Bay Intermediate is an intermediate (years 7–8) school with a roll of 1,094 students as at July 2026, which first opened in 1958. Both schools are coeducational, and have a decile rating of 10Z. The two schools share a site, and were established in 1957 and 1958 respectively. Close to Murrays Bay, is Rangitoto College, This school is the biggest in New Zealand. The school opened on the 6th of February 1956.

== Bibliography ==
- Cass, David (1989). ECB – the Years to 1989. East Coast Bays City Council.
- Stone, R. C. J. (2001). From Tamaki-makau-rau to Auckland. Auckland University Press. ISBN 1869402596.
- Verran, David (2010), The North Shore: An Illustrated History, North Shore: Random House, OL 33434370W, Wikidata Q120520385
- Willis, Jenny (2018). Early History of East Coast Bays (Second ed.).
