= Castor Bay =

- Suburb
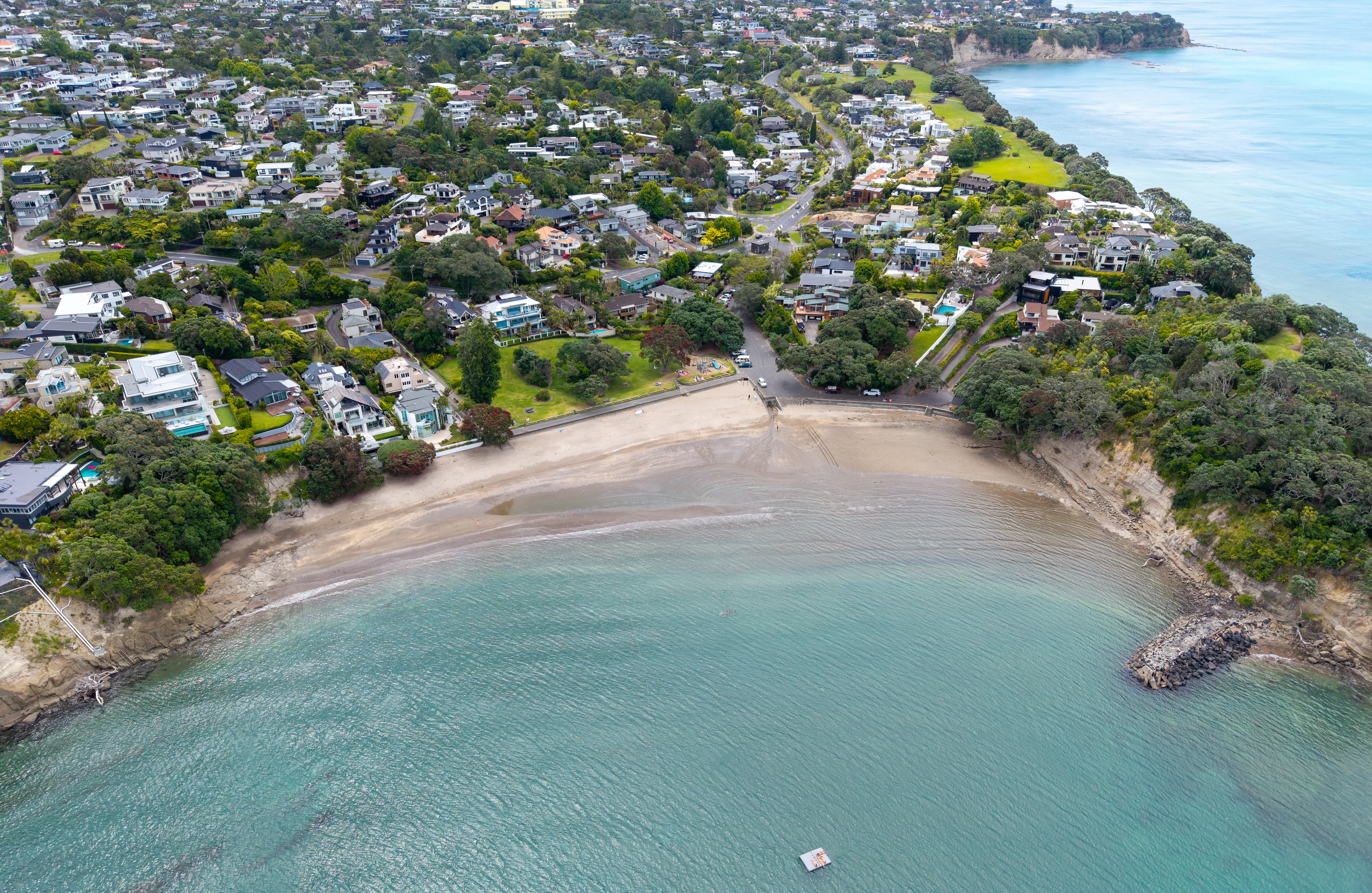
- Castor Bay from the air
- Interactive map of Castor Bay
- Coordinates: 36.762°S 174.766°E
- Country: New Zealand
- City: Auckland
- Local authority: Auckland Council
- Electoral ward: North Shore ward
- Local board: Devonport-Takapuna Local Board

Area
  - Land: 144 ha (360 acres)

Population (June 2025)
  - Total: 4,760
  - Density: 3,310/km^{2} (8,560/sq mi)
- Postcode: 0620

Sunnynook	Campbells Bay	(Hauraki Gulf)
Forrest Hill	Castor Bay	(Hauraki Gulf)
Forrest Hill	Milford	(Hauraki Gulf)

Castor Bay is a bay and suburb of the North Shore, located in Auckland which is in the North Island of New Zealand. Located between Milford and Campbells Bay, it is part of the East Coast Bays. To the east lies the islands of Rangitoto and Motutapu, which are easily visible from land. The suburb is in the North Shore ward, one of the thirteen administrative divisions of Auckland Council.

The bay itself is quite small and is well sheltered by an artificial breakwater that extends from the northern edge of the bay, running towards the south. A small bark and grass area with several large pōhutukawa trees offering shelter complements the beachfront and an extended coastline stretches out to the north towards Campbells Bay.

== Geography ==
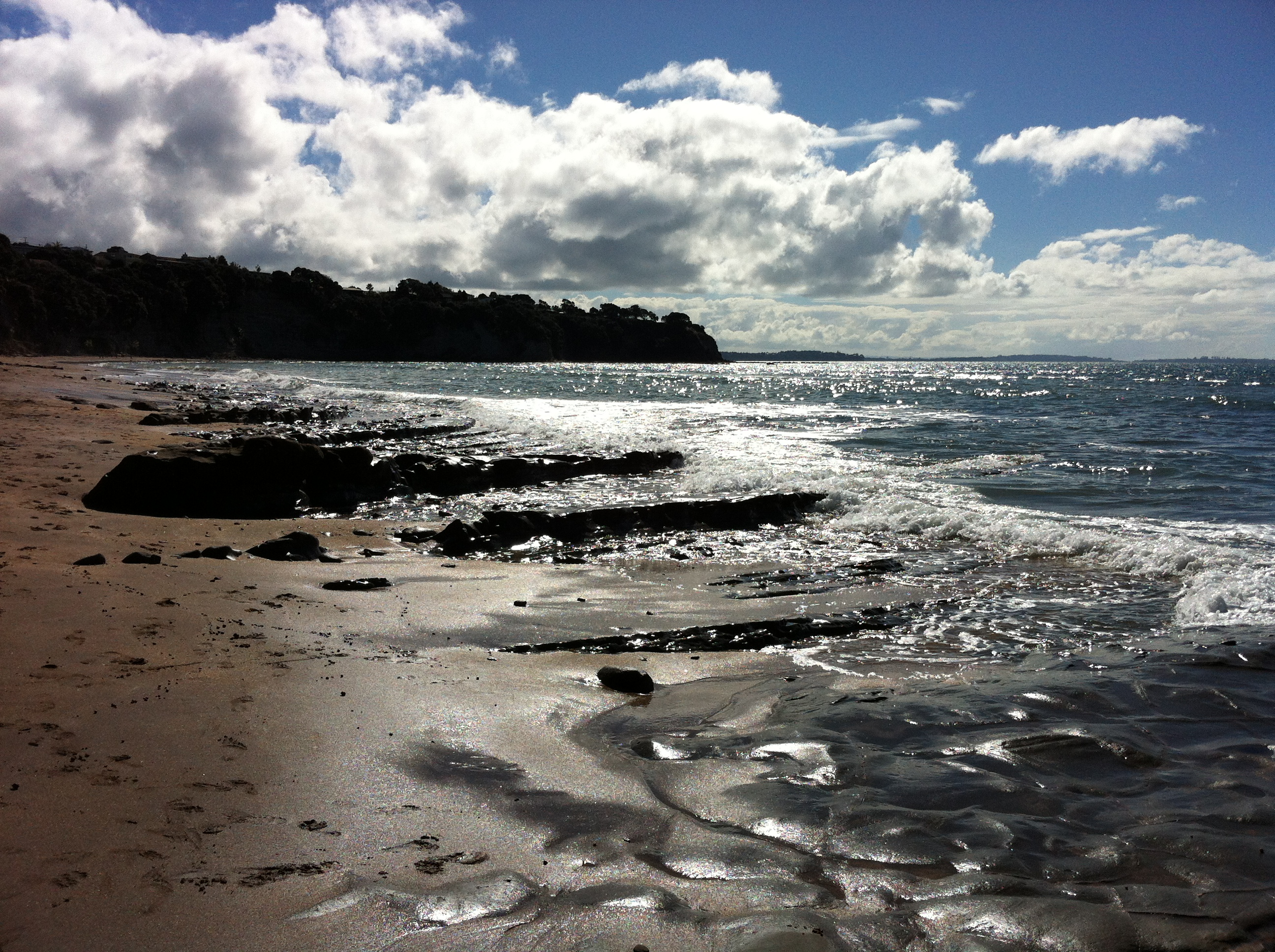
Castor Bay beach

Castor Bay is located on the east coast of the North Shore, between Campbells Bay and Milford. The bay to the east shares the same name as the suburb, and looks out towards Rangitoto. The point to the east of Castor Bay is called Rahopara Point, and the river at the southern border of the suburb is called Wairau Creek.

The land is primarily formed from clay and Waitemata sandstone, which can be seen in the cliffs along the coast. Prior to human settlement, the inland Castor Bay area was primarily a northern broadleaf podocarp forest, dominated by kauri, tōtara, mataī, miro, kauri and kahikatea trees. Pōhutukawa trees were a major feature of the coastline.

== History ==
=== Māori history ===
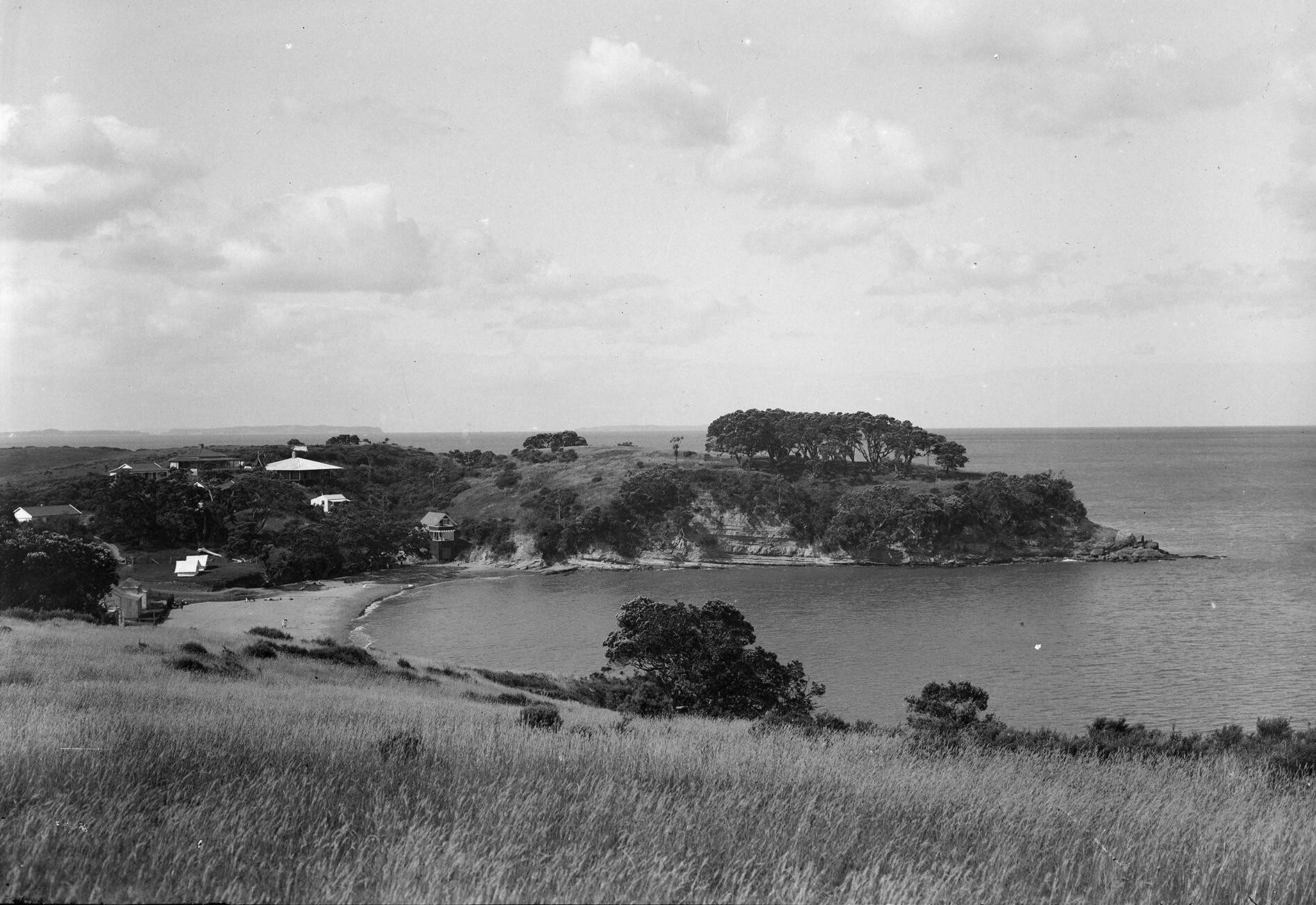
Castor Bay in 1916. Rahopara Point headland was used as a defensive pā by Te Kawerau ā Maki

Māori settlement of the Auckland Region began around the 13th or 14th centuries. The North Shore was settled by Tāmaki Māori, including people descended from the Tainui migratory canoe and ancestors of figures such as Taikehu and Peretū. Many of the Tāmaki Māori people of the North Shore identified as Ngā Oho. While the poor soils in the area hindered dense settlement, traditional resources in the area included fish, shellfish and marine birds.

The warrior Maki migrated from the Kāwhia Harbour to his ancestral home in the Auckland Region, likely sometime in the 17th century. Maki conquered and unified many the Tāmaki Māori tribes as Te Kawerau ā Maki, including those of the North Shore. After Maki's death, his sons settled different areas of his lands, creating new hapū. His younger son Maraeariki settled the North Shore and Hibiscus Coast, who based himself at the head of the Ōrewa River. Maraeariki's daughter Kahu succeeded him, and she is the namesake of the North Shore, Te Whenua Roa o Kahu ("The Greater Lands of Kahu"). Many of the iwi of the North Shore, including Ngāti Manuhiri, Ngāti Maraeariki, Ngāti Kahu, Ngāti Poataniwha, Ngāi Tai Ki Tāmaki and Ngāti Whātua, can trace their lineage to Kahu.

The northern headland of Castor Bay is the site of an old Māori pā, Rahopara, also known as Te Rahopara o Peretū. Archaeological studies have dated an earth oven at the site to between the mid-15th and mid-16th centuries, and generations of Tāmaki Māori adapted the defenses of the pā over time. The name of the pā is associated with Peretū, an ancestor of the Ngāi Tai ki Tāmaki people, and the pā was known as a defensive stronghold of Te Kawerau ā Maki. Traditional histories recount Te Patukirikiri ancestor Kapetaua sacking the pā in the 17th century, as revenge for being marooned at Te Toka-o-Kapetaua (Bean Rock). A second pā known as Wairoa Pā was located further south, at the headland overlooking the mouth of the Wairau Creek.

By the 18th century, the Marutūāhu iwi Ngāti Paoa had expanded their influence to include the islands of the Hauraki Gulf and the North Shore. After periods of conflict, peace had been reached by the 1790s. The earliest contact with Europeans began in the late 18th century, which caused many Tāmaki Māori to die of rewharewha, respiratory diseases. During the early 1820s, most Māori of the North Shore fled for the Waikato or Northland due to the threat of war parties during the Musket Wars. Most people had returned by the late 1820s and 1830s.

=== European settlement ===
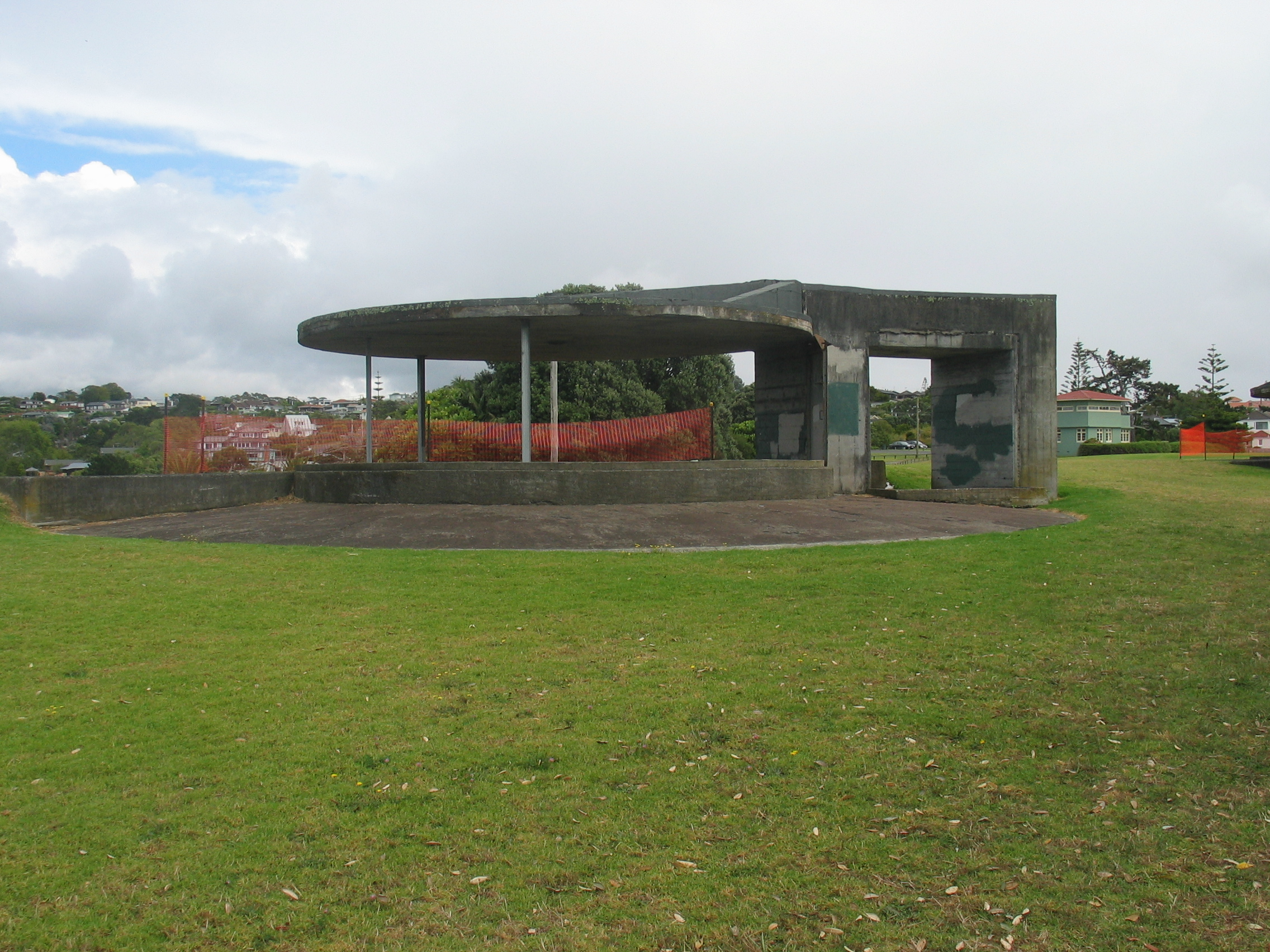
A World War II gun emplacement at J F Kennedy Memorial Park

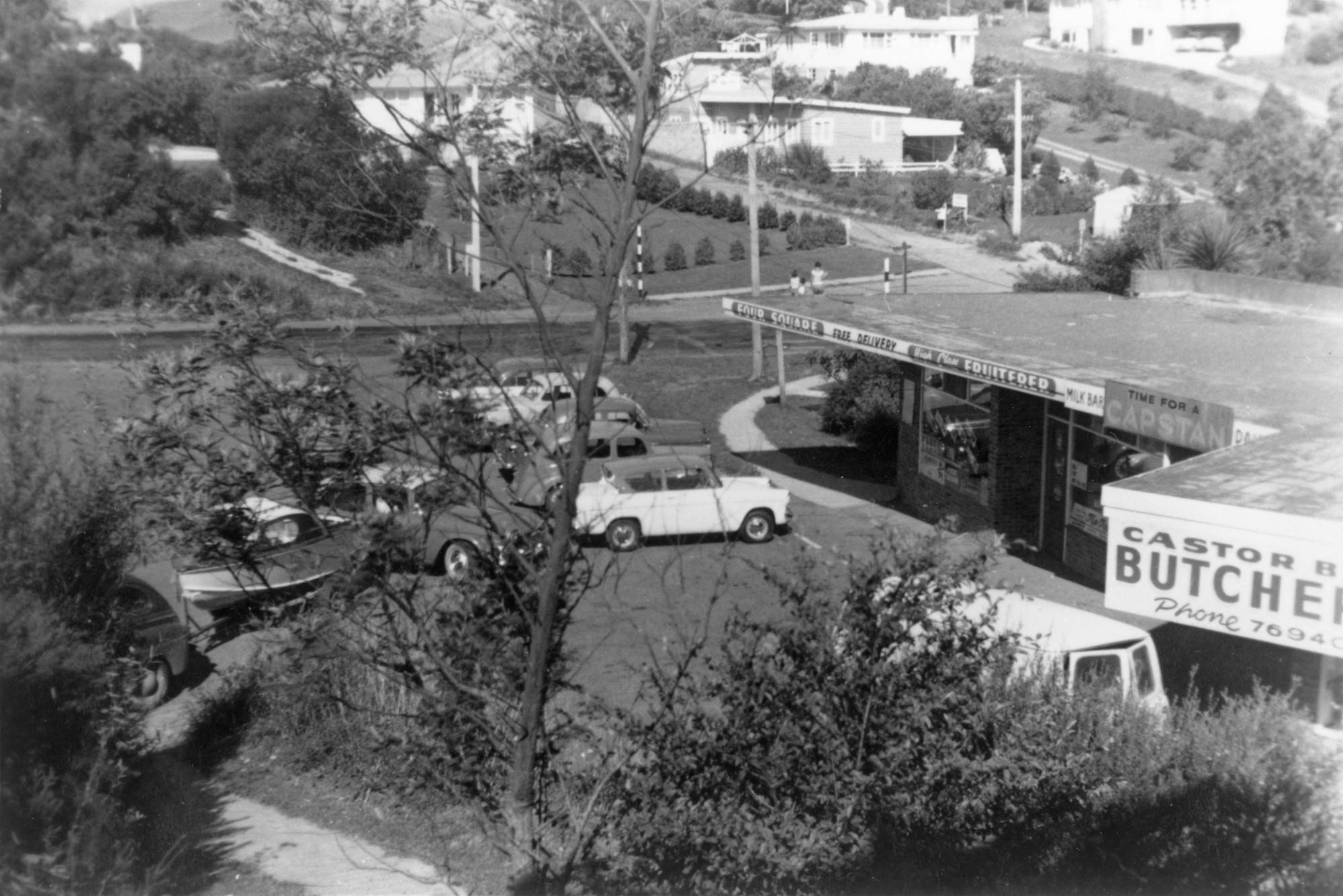
New suburban shops in Castor Bay in the 1960s

In 1841, the Crown purchased the Mahurangi and Omaha blocks; an area that spanned from Takapuna to Te Ārai. The purchase involved some iwi with customary interests in the area, such as Ngāti Paoa, other Marutūāhu iwi and Ngāi Tai ki Tāmaki, but not others, such as Te Kawerau ā Maki or Ngāti Rango. The Crown spent until 1873 rectifying this sale, by making further deals with stakeholders.

Castor Bay was originally known as Castor Oil Bay, after an early settler planted castor bean trees on the hillsides of the area. The name Castor Bay started to be used from the 1910s, and from the mid-1910s the area was subdivided by the Castor Oil Bay Land Company. By the early 20th century, the bay had become a popular destination for daytrippers and holiday makers, and holiday baches were constructed here. In the 1920s, the bay became a popular with New Zealand literary figures, after resident Jane Stronach made her bach available to people including poet D'Arcy Cresswell, novelist Jane Mander and poet R. A. K. Mason.

During World War II, the Castor Bay Battery and Camp was built during World War II, to protect the Rangitoto Channel. The site was originally purchased by the Army in 1934, and the military buildings were disguised as a state housing project. The site was decommissioned in 1957, and given to the Takapuna City Council in 1966, becoming the JF Kennedy Memorial Park.

After the construction of the Auckland Harbour Bridge in 1959, the area developed further, and the first convenience stores opened in Castor Bay. The Rahopara pā archaeological site was almost destroyed in 1965, as the earthworks were planned to be excavated and used as fill for a marina. Plans for this were cancelled after lobbying by archaeologists and local residents.

== Demographics ==
Castor Bay covers 1.44 km^{2} (0.56 sq mi) and had an estimated population of 4,760 as of June 2025, with a population density of 3,306 people per km^{2}.

Historical population
Year	Pop.	±% p.a.
2006	4,116	—
2013	4,305	+0.64%
2018	4,509	+0.93%
2023	4,548	+0.17%

Castor Bay had a population of 4,548 in the 2023 New Zealand census, an increase of 39 people (0.9%) since the 2018 census, and an increase of 243 people (5.6%) since the 2013 census. There were 2,232 males, 2,310 females and 9 people of other genders in 1,629 dwellings. 2.5% of people identified as LGBTIQ+. The median age was 43.1 years (compared with 38.1 years nationally). There were 786 people (17.3%) aged under 15 years, 798 (17.5%) aged 15 to 29, 2,175 (47.8%) aged 30 to 64, and 789 (17.3%) aged 65 or older.

People could identify as more than one ethnicity. The results were 71.9% European (Pākehā); 4.9% Māori; 1.6% Pasifika; 24.5% Asian; 2.7% Middle Eastern, Latin American and African New Zealanders (MELAA); and 3.4% other, which includes people giving their ethnicity as "New Zealander". English was spoken by 94.3%, Māori language by 0.7%, Samoan by 0.2%, and other languages by 27.2%. No language could be spoken by 1.4% (e.g. too young to talk). New Zealand Sign Language was known by 0.3%. The percentage of people born overseas was 42.3, compared with 28.8% nationally.

Religious affiliations were 30.1% Christian, 0.7% Hindu, 1.0% Islam, 0.2% Māori religious beliefs, 1.4% Buddhist, 0.3% New Age, 0.2% Jewish, and 1.1% other religions. People who answered that they had no religion were 60.2%, and 4.9% of people did not answer the census question.

Of those at least 15 years old, 1,650 (43.9%) people had a bachelor's or higher degree, 1,524 (40.5%) had a post-high school certificate or diploma, and 585 (15.6%) people exclusively held high school qualifications. The median income was $55,500, compared with $41,500 nationally. 1,029 people (27.4%) earned over $100,000 compared to 12.1% nationally. The employment status of those at least 15 was that 1,968 (52.3%) people were employed full-time, 540 (14.4%) were part-time, and 69 (1.8%) were unemployed.

Individual statistical areas
Name	Area (km^{2})	Population	Density (per km^{2})	Dwellings	Median age	Median income
Castor Bay North	0.89	2,457	2,761	879	43.9 years	$55,300
Castor Bay South	0.56	2,094	3,739	747	41.8 years	$55,900
New Zealand					38.1 years	$41,500

== Education ==
The local primary school is Campbells Bay Primary School located on Aberdeen Road, nearby the Pupuke Golf Course. It has a roll of 802 as of July 2026. The school opened in 1925.

In 2025, the school’s roll declined, which principal Bevan Thomas attributed to high property prices and limited housing redevelopment in the area. He noted that while migration has boosted rolls in some other Auckland schools, it has not had the same effect in Campbells Bay.

== Local government ==
From 1876 until 1954, the area was administered by the Waitemata County, a large rural county north and west of the city of Auckland. In 1954, Castor Bay was added to the Borough of Takapuna, which became Takapuna City in 1961. In 1989, the city was merged into the North Shore City. North Shore City was amalgamated into Auckland Council in November 2010.

Within the Auckland Council, Castor Bay is a part of the Devonport-Takapuna local government area governed by the Devonport-Takapuna Local Board. It is a part of the North Shore ward, which elects two councillors to the Auckland Council.

== Notable people ==
- Sam Hunt, one of New Zealand's most well known poets, was born in Castor Bay.
- Robin Hyde, South African-born New Zealand poet.

== Bibliography ==
- Stone, R. C. J. (2001). From Tamaki-makau-rau to Auckland. Auckland University Press. ISBN 1869402596.
- Verran, David (2010), The North Shore: An Illustrated History, North Shore: Random House, OL 33434370W, Wikidata Q120520385
- Willis, Jenny (2018). Early History of East Coast Bays (Second ed.).
