= Campbells Bay =

- Suburb
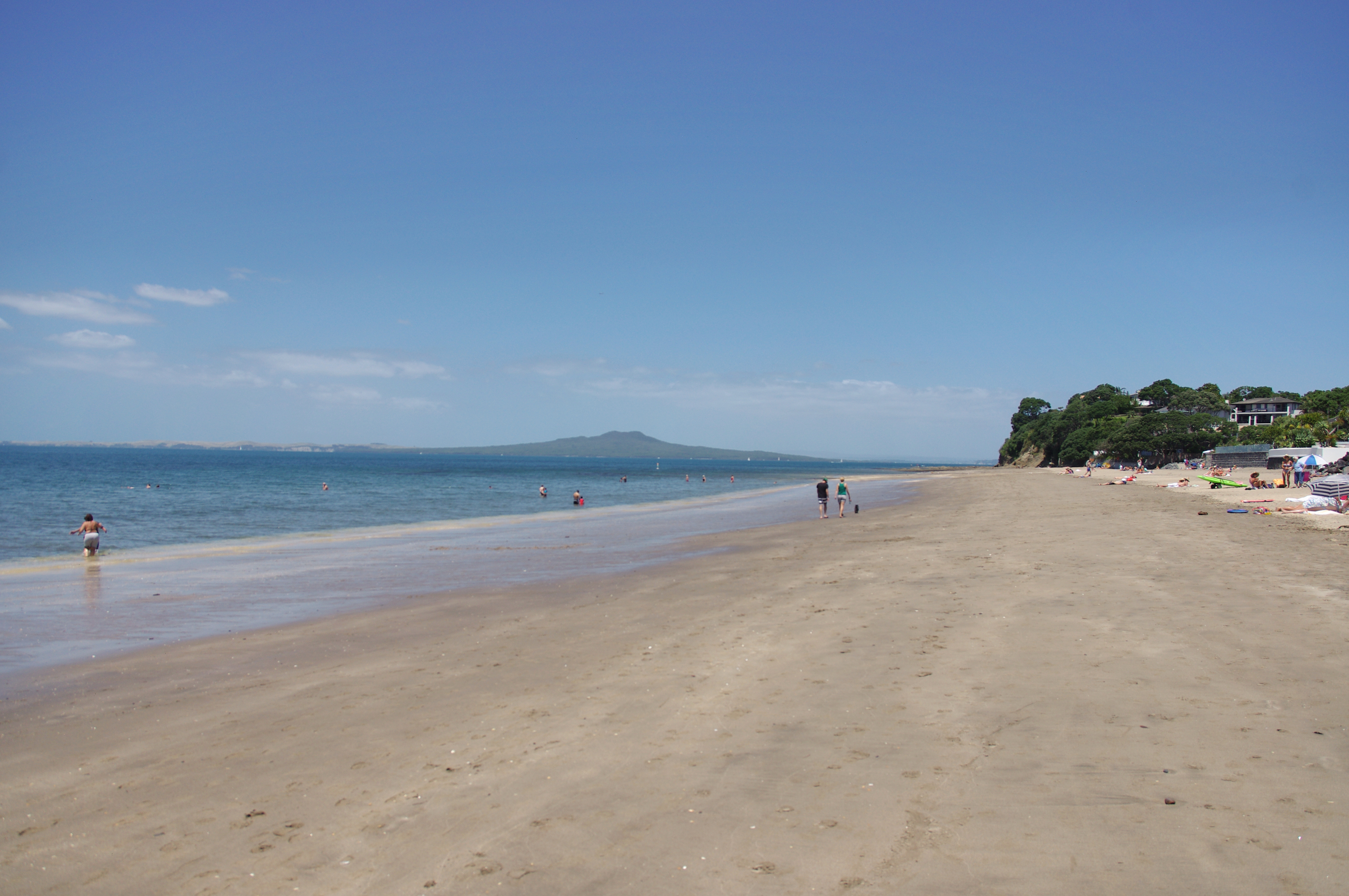
- Interactive map of Campbells Bay
- Coordinates: 36°44′52″S 174°45′32″E
- Country: New Zealand
- City: Auckland
- Local authority: Auckland Council
- Electoral ward: Albany ward
- Local board: Hibiscus and Bays

Area
  - Land: 174 ha (430 acres)

Population (June 2025)
  - Total: 2,960
  - Density: 1,700/km^{2} (4,410/sq mi)
- Postcode(s): 0630, 0620

Windsor Park	Mairangi Bay	(Hauraki Gulf)
Sunnynook	Campbells Bay	(Hauraki Gulf)
Glenfield	Forrest Hill	Castor Bay

Campbells Bay is a suburb of the North Shore located in Auckland, New Zealand.

== Geography ==
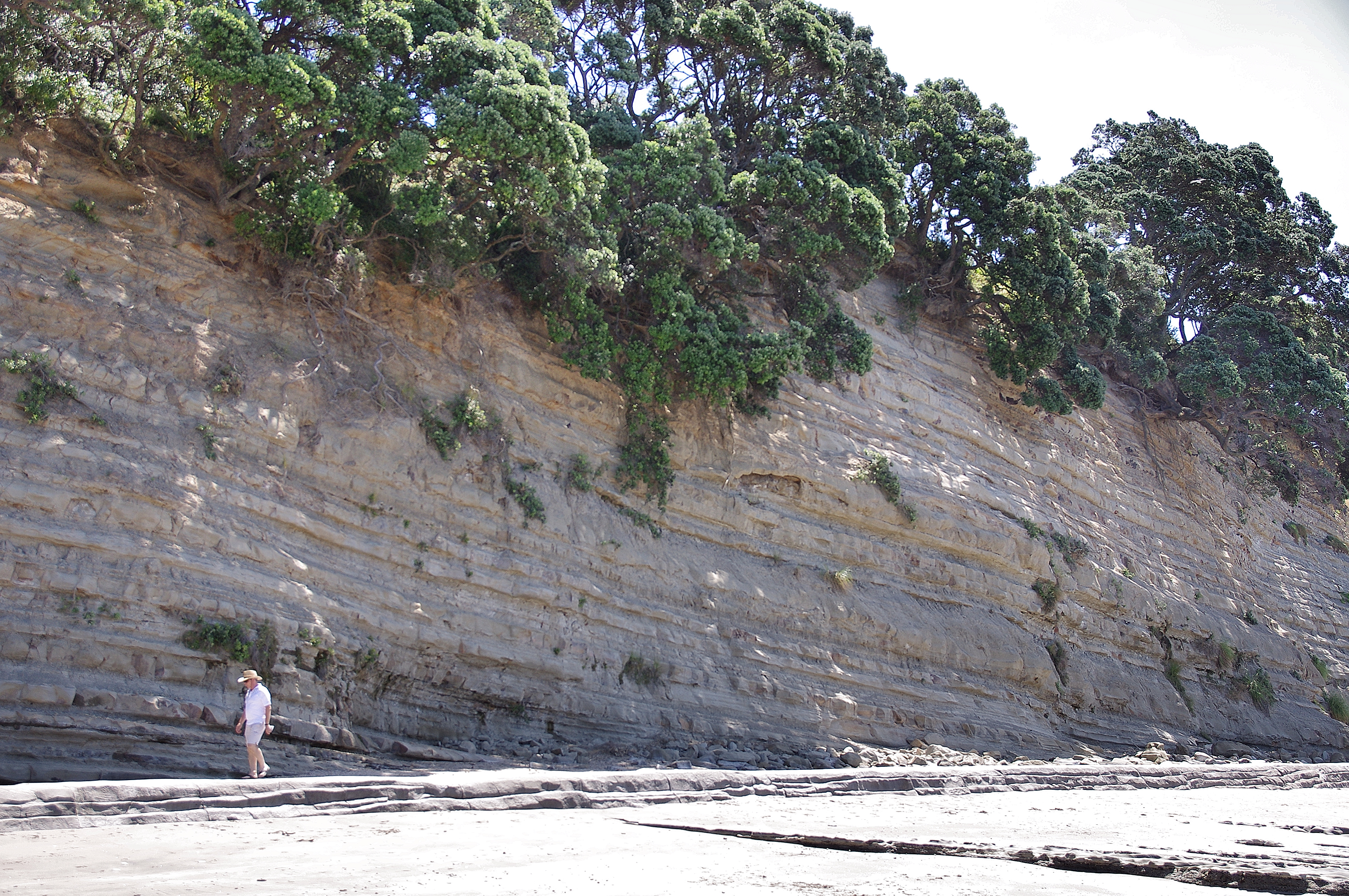
Eroding Waitemata Group sandstone cliffs at Campbells Bay

Campbells Bay is located in the East Coast Bays of the North Shore, between Mairangi Bay and Castor Bay. The bay to the east shares the same name as the suburb, and looks out towards the Hauraki Gulf and the Coromandel Peninsula. South of Campbells Bay beach is a cliff, known as Red Bluff.

The land is primarily formed from clay and Waitemata sandstone, which can be seen in the cliffs along the coast. Prior to human settlement, the inland Campbells Bay area was primarily a northern broadleaf podocarp forest, dominated by kauri, with significant numbers of tōtara, mataī, miro, kauri and kahikatea trees. Pōhutukawa trees were a major feature of the coastline.

== History ==
=== Māori history ===
Māori settlement of the Auckland Region began around the 13th or 14th centuries. The North Shore was settled by Tāmaki Māori, including people descended from the Tainui migratory canoe and ancestors of figures such as Taikehu and Peretū. Many of the Tāmaki Māori people of the North Shore identified as Ngā Oho. While the poor soils around the East Coast Bays hindered dense settlement, traditional resources in the area included fish, shellfish and marine birds. The traditional name for the coast between Murrays Bay and Campbells Bay is Waipapa.

The warrior Maki migrated from the Kāwhia Harbour to his ancestral home in the Auckland Region, likely sometime in the 17th century. Maki conquered and unified many the Tāmaki Māori tribes as Te Kawerau ā Maki, including those of the North Shore. After Maki's death, his sons settled different areas of his lands, creating new hapū. His younger son Maraeariki settled the North Shore and Hibiscus Coast, who based himself at the head of the Ōrewa River. Maraeariki's daughter Kahu succeeded him, and she is the namesake of the North Shore, Te Whenua Roa o Kahu ("The Greater Lands of Kahu"). Many of the iwi of the North Shore, including Ngāti Manuhiri, Ngāti Maraeariki, Ngāti Kahu, Ngāti Poataniwha, Ngāi Tai Ki Tāmaki and Ngāti Whātua, can trace their lineage to Kahu.

By the 18th century, the Marutūāhu iwi Ngāti Paoa had expanded their influence to include the islands of the Hauraki Gulf and the North Shore. After periods of conflict, peace had been reached by the 1790s. The earliest contact with Europeans began in the late 18th century, which caused many Tāmaki Māori to die of rewharewha, respiratory diseases. During the early 1820s, most Māori of the North Shore fled for the Waikato or Northland due to the threat of war parties during the Musket Wars. Most people had returned by the late 1820s and 1830s.

=== European settlement ===
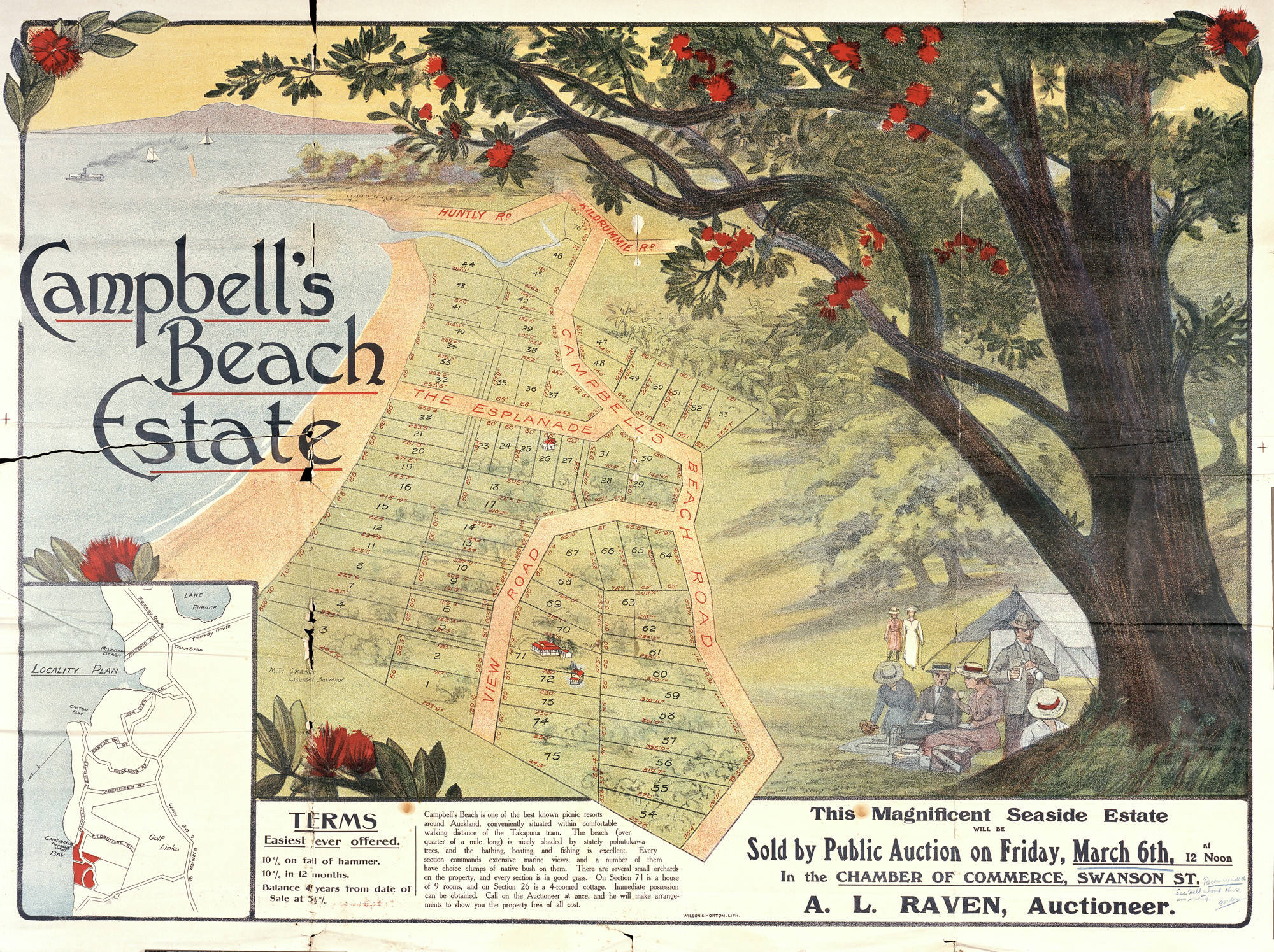
A flyer advertising the sale of allotments at the Campbell's Beach Estate, 1908

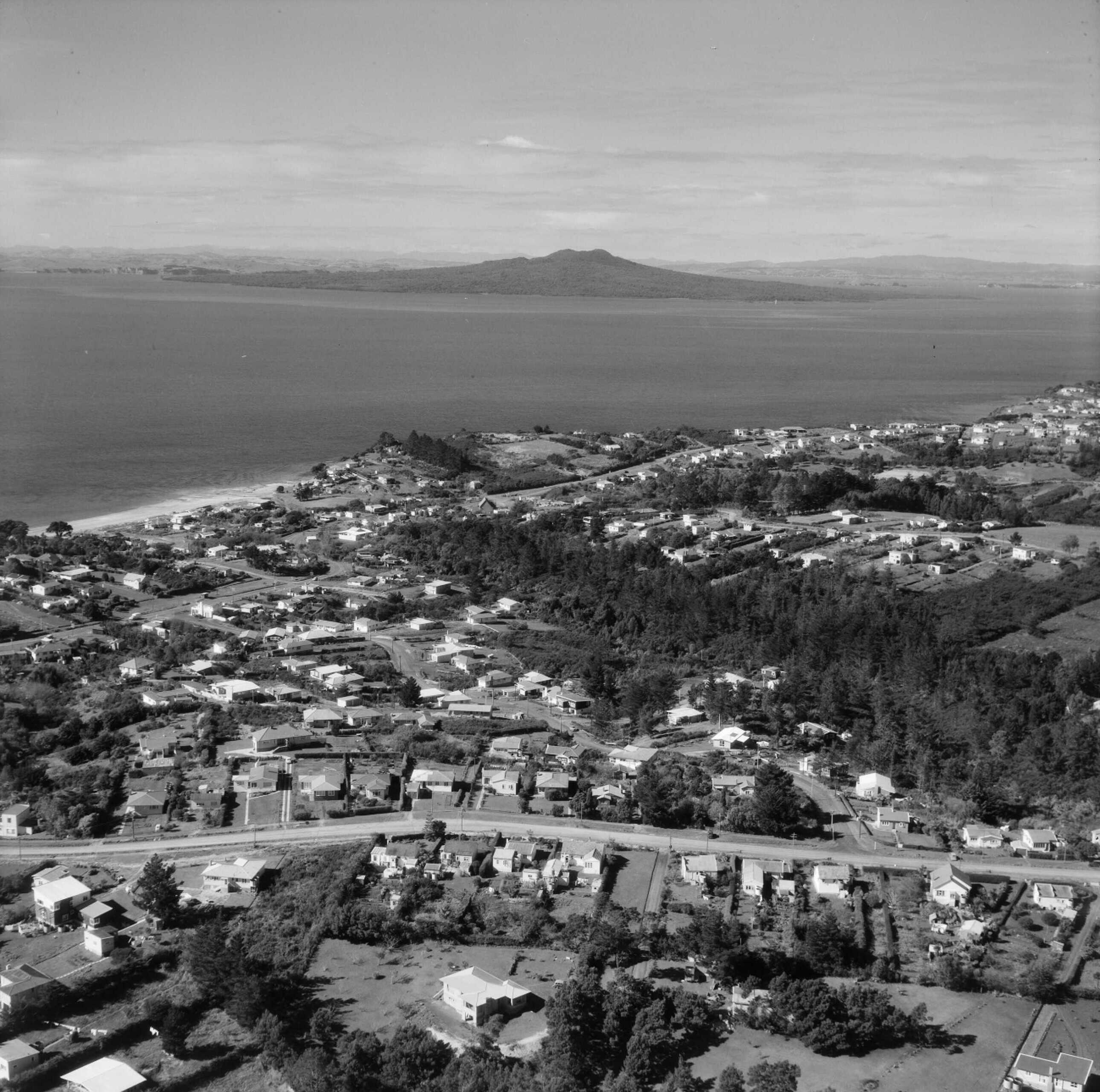
Aerial view of Campbells Bay in 1959

In 1841, the Crown purchased the Mahurangi and Omaha blocks; an area that spanned from Takapuna to Te Ārai. The purchase involved some iwi with customary interests in the area, such as Ngāti Paoa, other Marutūāhu iwi and Ngāi Tai ki Tāmaki, but not others, such as Te Kawerau ā Maki or Ngāti Rango. The Crown spent until 1873 rectifying this sale, by making further deals with stakeholders.

The land at Campbells Bay was first purchased by John Logan Campbell in 1845. In 1850, Scottish immigrant Donald Mackay from Reay came to New Zealand to join his brother Alexander Mackay, who was farming land near Lake Pupuke. Alexander Mackay bought 60 acres of land from Campbell, to develop into a farm worked by his brother Donald. Around this period, one of the largest kauri gum diggers camps on the North Shore was established in the area. Originally known as Donalds Bay, the bay became known as Johnston's Bay, after the Johnston family from County Tyrone in Northern Ireland set up a dairy farm and grew vegetables in the area. The Johnston family sold their milk to residents in Takapuna and the gum diggers who visited the area. In 1885, 70 hectares of scrubland was gazetted as a nature reserve called the Takapuna Domain (renamed Centennial Park in 1940), which over time regenerated into native bush.

The Johnston family sold the farm to a farmer named Mr. Cave in 1888, around the time that orchards became an important feature of the farm. In 1894, Mr. Cave sold the property to Duncan Campbell, well known for his Auckland shoe store, after which the bay became known as Campbells Bay. In 1912, the farm was subdivided, and Campbells Bay became a popular spot for holidayers, due to its relative proximity to the terminus for the Milford to Bayswater tram. Holiday baches were built in the area until World War I stopped the construction of new baches. In 1914, a portion of the Takapuna Domain became the Pupuke Golf Club, and from 1920 better roading in the area led to the construction of permanent homes.

In 1938, the Central Methodist Mission established a health camp at Campbells Bay, which by the 1940s became the main health camp for in-need youth in Auckland. In 1940 to celebrate 100 years since the establishment of Auckland, Takapuna Domain was renamed Centennial Park, and extensive planting was done to create a native bush. During World War II, defensive pillboxes were constructed in Centennial Park.

== Local government ==
From 1876 until 1954, the area was administered by the Waitemata County, a large rural county north and west of the city of Auckland. In 1954, the area split from the county, forming the East Coast Bays Borough Council, which became East Coast Bays City in 1975. In 1989, the city was merged into the North Shore City. North Shore City was amalgamated into Auckland Council in November 2010.

Within the Auckland Council, Campbells Bay is a part of the Hibiscus and Bays local government area governed by the Hibiscus and Bays Local Board. It is a part of the Albany ward, which elects two councillors to the Auckland Council.

== Demographics ==
Campbells Bay covers 1.74 km^{2} (0.67 sq mi) and had an estimated population of 2,960 as of June 2025, with a population density of 1,701 people per km^{2}.

Historical population
Year	Pop.	±% p.a.
2006	2,688	—
2013	2,835	+0.76%
2018	2,889	+0.38%
2023	2,847	−0.29%

Campbells Bay had a population of 2,847 in the 2023 New Zealand census, a decrease of 42 people (−1.5%) since the 2018 census, and an increase of 12 people (0.4%) since the 2013 census. There were 1,419 males, 1,422 females and 6 people of other genders in 966 dwellings. 2.3% of people identified as LGBTIQ+. The median age was 42.1 years (compared with 38.1 years nationally). There were 540 people (19.0%) aged under 15 years, 489 (17.2%) aged 15 to 29, 1,344 (47.2%) aged 30 to 64, and 474 (16.6%) aged 65 or older.

People could identify as more than one ethnicity. The results were 75.8% European (Pākehā); 6.3% Māori; 0.7% Pasifika; 23.1% Asian; 2.0% Middle Eastern, Latin American and African New Zealanders (MELAA); and 1.6% other, which includes people giving their ethnicity as "New Zealander". English was spoken by 94.9%, Māori language by 0.4%, and other languages by 24.3%. No language could be spoken by 1.3% (e.g. too young to talk). New Zealand Sign Language was known by 0.1%. The percentage of people born overseas was 39.8, compared with 28.8% nationally.

Religious affiliations were 28.5% Christian, 0.4% Hindu, 0.8% Islam, 0.8% Buddhist, 0.1% New Age, 0.6% Jewish, and 0.9% other religions. People who answered that they had no religion were 61.2%, and 6.4% of people did not answer the census question.

Of those at least 15 years old, 1,068 (46.3%) people had a bachelor's or higher degree, 918 (39.8%) had a post-high school certificate or diploma, and 324 (14.0%) people exclusively held high school qualifications. The median income was $54,200, compared with $41,500 nationally. 666 people (28.9%) earned over $100,000 compared to 12.1% nationally. The employment status of those at least 15 was that 1,146 (49.7%) people were employed full-time, 411 (17.8%) were part-time, and 54 (2.3%) were unemployed.

== Education ==
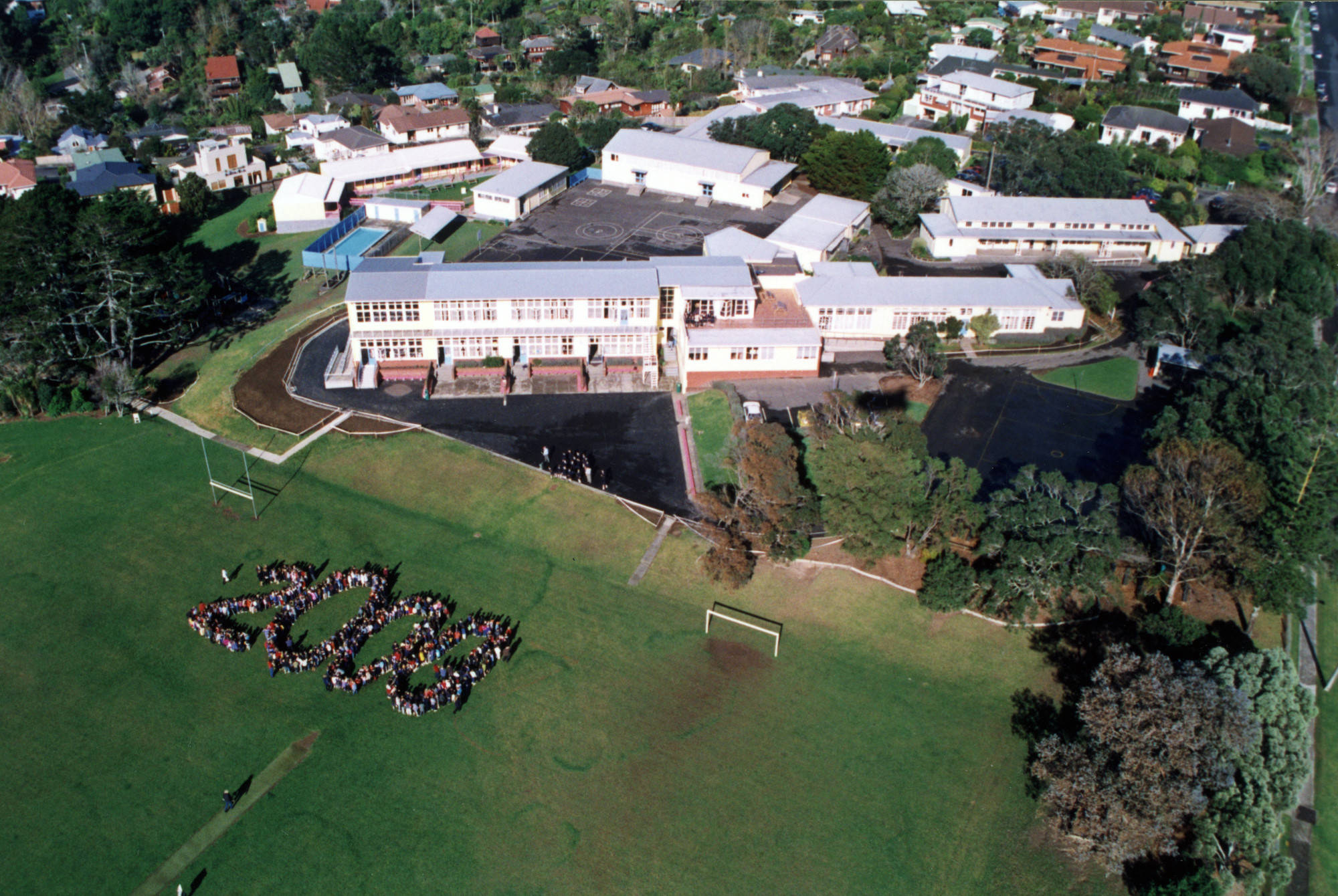
An aerial shot of Campbells Bay Primary School in the year 2000

Campbells Bay Primary School is a coeducational contributing primary (years 1–6) school with a roll of 802 students as of July 2026, which opened in August 1925. In 1973, Kristin School was established at the former Methodist Health Camp in Campbells Bay. As the school grew rapidly, a new campus was opened in Albany in 1978.

== Amenities ==
- A popular public walkway connects Campbells Bay to Browns Bay in the north, passing sections of exposed Waitemata sandstone.
- Centennial Park, a 70-hectare park which is the largest area of regenerating native bush in the East Coast Bays area.

== Bibliography ==
- Cass, David (1989). ECB – the Years to 1989. East Coast Bays City Council.
- Sheehan, Vanessa (2019). An Almost Complete History of the East Coast Bays.
- Stone, R. C. J. (2001). From Tamaki-makau-rau to Auckland. Auckland University Press. ISBN 1869402596.
- Verran, David (2010), The North Shore: An Illustrated History, North Shore: Random House, OL 33434370W, Wikidata Q120520385
- Willis, Jenny (2018). Early History of East Coast Bays (Second ed.).
