= Windsor Park, New Zealand =

Windsor Park
- Suburb
- Interactive map of Windsor Park
- Coordinates: 36.738°S 174.736°E
- Country: New Zealand
- City: Auckland
- Local authority: Auckland Council
- Electoral ward: Albany ward
- Local board: Upper Harbour Local Board

Area
  - Land: 84 ha (210 acres)

Population (June 2025)
  - Total: 1,840
  - Density: 2,200/km^{2} (5,700/sq mi)
- Postcode: 0632

Pinehill	Browns Bay	Murrays Bay
Rosedale	Windsor Park	Mairangi Bay
Totara Vale	Sunnynook	Campbells Bay

Windsor Park is a small suburb located on the North Shore of Auckland, which is in New Zealand.

== Demographics ==
Windsor Park covers 0.84 km^{2} (0.32 sq mi) and had an estimated population of 1,840 as of June 2025, with a population density of 2,190 people per km^{2}.

Historical population
Year	Pop.	±% p.a.
2006	1,500	—
2013	1,614	+1.05%
2018	1,683	+0.84%
2023	1,713	+0.35%

Windsor Park had a population of 1,713 in the 2023 New Zealand census, an increase of 30 people (1.8%) since the 2018 census, and an increase of 99 people (6.1%) since the 2013 census. There were 756 males, 954 females and 3 people of other genders in 726 dwellings. 2.8% of people identified as LGBTIQ+. The median age was 43.5 years (compared with 38.1 years nationally). There were 267 people (15.6%) aged under 15 years, 285 (16.6%) aged 15 to 29, 651 (38.0%) aged 30 to 64, and 513 (29.9%) aged 65 or older.

People could identify as more than one ethnicity. The results were 46.9% European (Pākehā); 2.6% Māori; 1.9% Pasifika; 49.9% Asian; 2.5% Middle Eastern, Latin American and African New Zealanders (MELAA); and 1.6% other, which includes people giving their ethnicity as "New Zealander". English was spoken by 90.2%, Māori language by 0.5%, Samoan by 0.4%, and other languages by 44.8%. No language could be spoken by 1.4% (e.g. too young to talk). The percentage of people born overseas was 58.0, compared with 28.8% nationally.

Religious affiliations were 38.2% Christian, 2.1% Hindu, 1.1% Islam, 2.3% Buddhist, 0.2% New Age, and 1.2% other religions. People who answered that they had no religion were 49.7%, and 5.1% of people did not answer the census question.

Of those at least 15 years old, 432 (29.9%) people had a bachelor's or higher degree, 549 (38.0%) had a post-high school certificate or diploma, and 366 (25.3%) people exclusively held high school qualifications. The median income was $34,200, compared with $41,500 nationally. 147 people (10.2%) earned over $100,000 compared to 12.1% nationally. The employment status of those at least 15 was that 573 (39.6%) people were employed full-time, 189 (13.1%) were part-time, and 33 (2.3%) were unemployed.

== Education ==
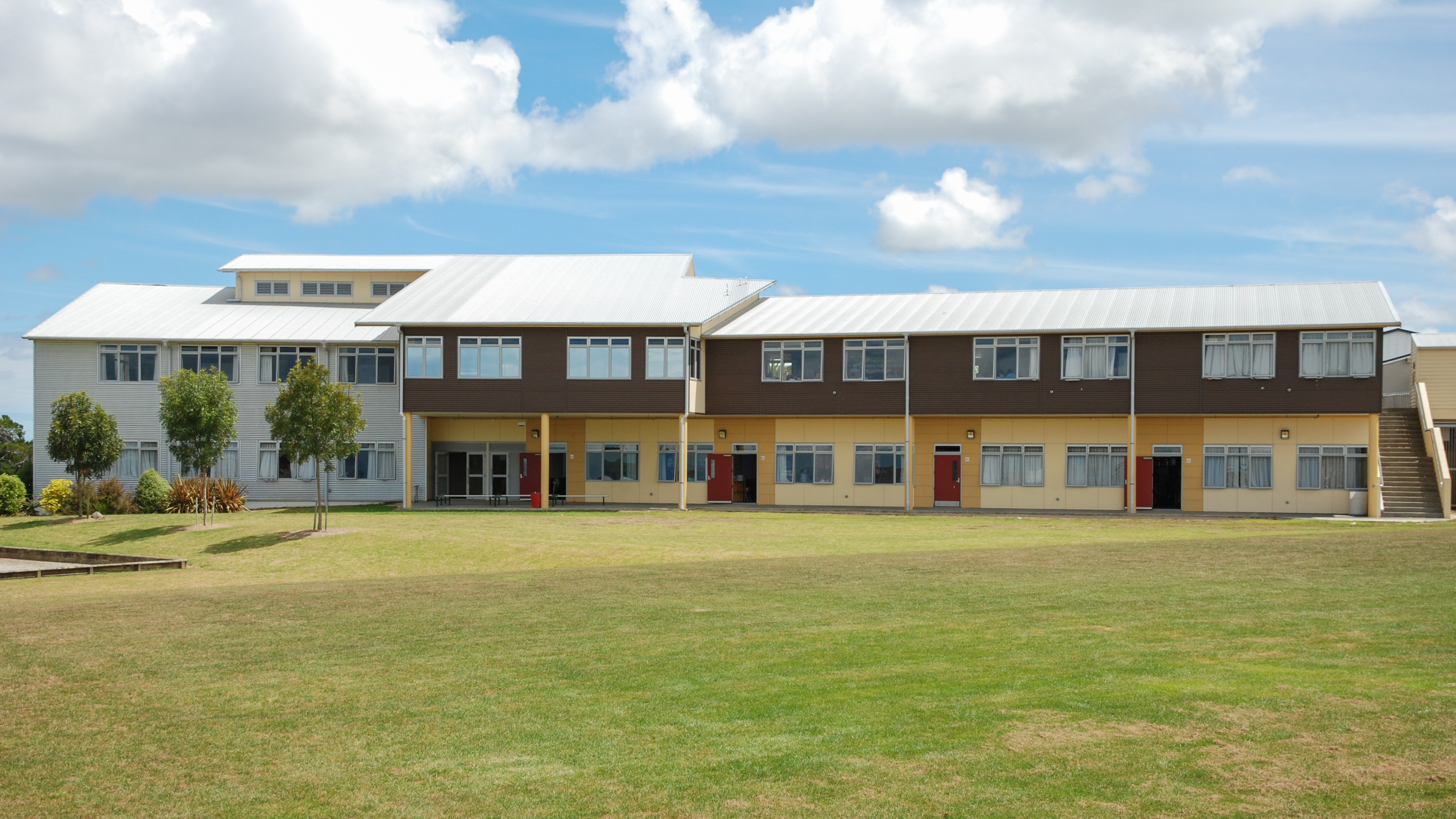
Maths Building at Rangitoto College

Rangitoto College is a coeducational secondary (years 9-13) school with a roll of 4030 students as at July 2025. Founded in 1956, it is now the largest secondary school in New Zealand.

Te Pūrongo Arotake Mātauranga (Te Kura Kaupapa Māori o Te Raki Paewhenua) is a coeducational full primary (years 1-8) school with a roll of 144 students as at July 2025. It is a Kura Kaupapa Māori school which places a strong emphasis on the revitalisation and retention of te reo Māori.

== Sport ==
East Coast Bays Rugby Club as well as East Coast Bays Cricket are located in Windsor Park. East Coast Bays Rugby Club is one of the largest rugby clubs in the southern hemisphere. The Park and all its facilities including the Clubrooms are owned by Windsor Park Community and Multisport Hub Inc. East Coast Bays Rugby Club and East Coast Bays Cricket Club are joint tenants of the Park and its clubrooms
