= Russell Stone (historian) =

New Zealand historian (1923–2026)

Russell Stone ONZM
- Born: Russell Cyril James Stone; 7 April 1923; Mount Eden, Auckland, New Zealand
- Died: 20 October 2026 (aged 103)

Academic background
- Education: University of Auckland
- Thesis: Auckland business and businessmen in the 1880s (1969)
- Doctoral advisor: Keith Sinclair

Academic work
- Discipline: History
- Sub-discipline: History of Auckland
- Institutions: University of Auckland

Russell Cyril James Stone ONZM (7 April 1923 – 20 October 2026) was a New Zealand historian, author and academic who was a professor emeritus at the University of Auckland. In 2012, the New Zealand Herald called him the leading authority on the history of Auckland, having written nine books on early Auckland history.

== Life and career ==
Born in Mount Eden on 7 April 1923, Stone was educated at Mount Albert Grammar School, and graduated from Auckland University College (now the University of Auckland) with a Bachelor of Arts degree in 1945, and a Master of Arts degree with first-class honours in 1949. After working as a secondary-school teacher, Stone was appointed to the staff of the history department at the University of Auckland in 1964, and completed a PhD in history in 1969. His thesis was titled Auckland business and businessmen in the 1880s, and was published in 1973 as Makers of Fortune: A Colonial Business Community and Its Fall. He retired in 1989 and was granted the title of professor emeritus.

The memoirs of John Logan Campbell were published in 1881. Stone republished these long out-of-print tales in his book: Poenamo: Romance and Reality of Antipodean Life in the Infancy of a New Colony. Stone had earlier written a two-volume life of Campbell,Young Logan Campbell (1982) and The Father and his Gift: John Logan Campbell's Later Years (1987).

In the 2002 New Year Honours, Stone was appointed an Officer of the New Zealand Order of Merit, for services to historical research. He was the joint winner of the biennial J.M. Sherrard Award in New Zealand local and regional history in 2004, for his book From Tamaki-Makau-rau to Auckland, published in 2001.

Stone died on 20 October 2026, at the age of 103.

== Bibliography ==
- Stone, Russell Cyril James (1973). Makers of Fortune: A Colonial Business Community and Its Fall. Auckland: Auckland University Press. ISBN 978-0-19-647713-8. OCLC 903594. Wikidata Q118959056.
- Stone, Russell Cyril James (December 1982), Young Logan Campbell, Auckland: Auckland University Press, OCLC 10403251, Wikidata Q118959070
- Stone, Russell Cyril James (1987). The father and his gift: John Logan Campbell's later years. ISBN 1-86940-710-5. OCLC 988016057. Wikidata Q118959076.
- Stone, Russell Cyril James (2001). From Tamaki-Makau-Rau to Auckland. Auckland: Auckland University Press. ISBN 1-86940-259-6. OCLC 865330258. OL 3101881W. Wikidata Q118324088.
- Stone, Russell Cyril James (July 2007), Logan Campbell's Auckland: Tales from the Early Years, Auckland: Auckland University Press, Wikidata Q118959063
