= Ngā Oho =

Māori iwi (tribe) in New Zealand

- Iwi (tribe) in Māoridom
- Rohe (region): Tāmaki Makaurau
- Waka (canoe): Tainui, Arawa, Te Moekākara

Ngā Oho, also known as Ngā Ohomatakamokamo-o-Ohomairangi, is the name of a historical iwi (tribe) of Māori who settled in the Auckland Region. In the 17th century, Ngā Oho and two other tribes of shared heritage, Ngā Riki and Ngā Iwi, formed the Waiohua confederation of tribes.

== History ==
The name Ngā Oho was one of the earlier tribal names used by Tāmaki Māori people, descended from the legendary Tainui tohunga/navigator Rakatāura (also known as Hape), and Te Arawa. The name predates the migration canoes, and was the shared tribal identity of the members of the Tainui and Arawa canoes. Ngā Oho was used as a unifying name for Tainui peoples in Tāmaki Makaurau. By the 14th century, Ngā Oho had settled in the Waitākere Ranges area. Ngā Oho's rohe once spanned from Cape Rodney/Okakari Point near Leigh to Tauranga.

The iwi is named either after one of two historical rangatira Ohomairangi, or Ohomatakamokamo. Ohomatakamokamo was an ariki who lived at Rarotonga / Mount Smart, conquering the Tāmaki Makaurau area. Ohomatakamokamo's descendants settled on the Tāmaki isthmus, Waitākere Ranges and the southern shores of the Kaipara Harbour.

At a later date, Ngā Oho split into three tribes: Ngā Oho based at Papakura, Ngā Riki based in South Auckland between Papakura and Ōtāhuhu/Ihumātao, and Ngā Iwi, who were based between Ihumātao and from Ōtāhuhu to the North Shore. Within Ngā Oho, there were a number of hapū (sub-tribes), including Ngāti Taihaua, Ngāti Poutukeka and Ngāi Riukiuta.

In the 17th century, Hua Kaiwaka, a member of the Ngati Poutūkeka hapū of Ngā Oho, unified the three tribes of Ngā Oho, Ngā Riki and Ngā Iwi. The confederation began to be known as Waiohua ("The Waters of Huakaiwaka"), and this unification led to one of the most prosperous times for the Tāmaki Makaurau area. During the Waiohua confederation, Ngā Oho, Ngā Riki and Ngā Iwi continued to have distinct identities while being a part of Waiohua as a whole.

The Waiohua confederation ceased being the most powerful influence in the Auckland region in the mid-18th century, after Waiohua paramount chief Kiwi Tāmaki was killed while battling Te Taoū and Ngāti Whātua warriors from south Kaipara Harbour.

When Ngāti Whātua settled the Tāmaki isthmus in the mid-18th century, the name Ngā Oho was revived, as a way to describe a group of Ngāti Whātua Ōrākei of shared Te Taoū/Ngāti Whātua and Waiohua heritage.

== Descendant iwi and hapū and marae ==
Many iwi and hapū trace their lineage back to Ngā Oho, including:

- Ngāti Manuhiri
- Ngāti Tamaoho
- Ngāti Te Ata Waiohua
- Ngāti Whātua Ōrākei, especially the hapū Ngā Oho and Te Uringutu
- Te Ahiwaru Waiohua
- Te Ākitai Waiohua
- Te Kawerau ā Maki
