= Waitemata Group =

Geologic formation in New Zealand

- Stratigraphic range: Early Miocene
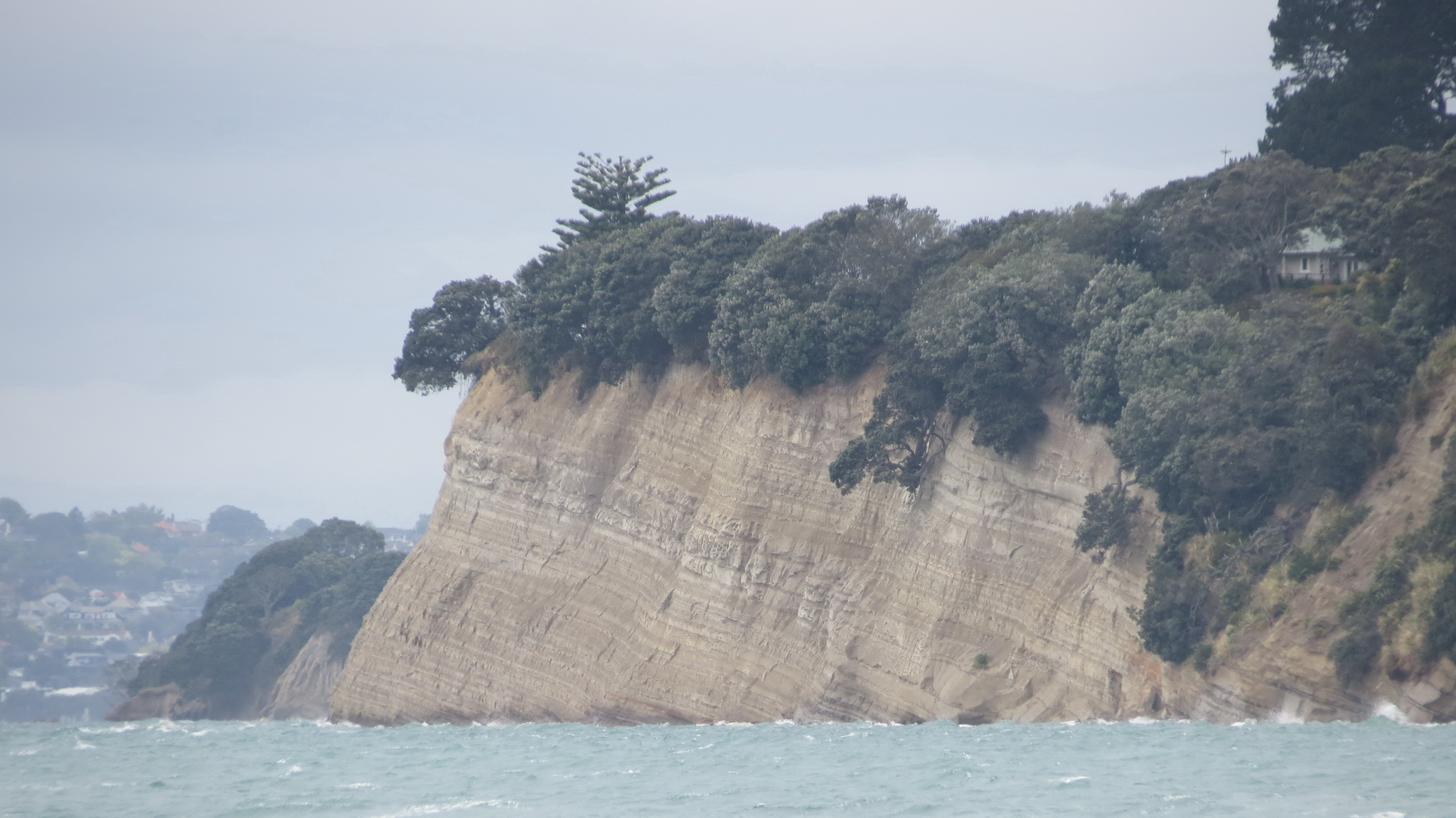
- Waitemata Group sandstones form the cliffs of Takapuna Beach
- Type: Geological group
- Sub-units: Bream Subgroup, Warkworth Subgroup, Meremere Subgroup, Kawau Subgroup
- Underlies: Waitakere Group
- Overlies: Waipapa Terrane and Te Kuiti Group
- Area: 130 km × 60 km (81 mi × 37 mi)
- Thickness: up to 2,000 m (6,600 ft)

Lithology
- Primary: Sandstone, siltstone, mudstone
- Other: Conglomerate, limestone, volcanoclastic sediments

Location
- Country: New Zealand

Type section
- Named for: Waitemata Harbour

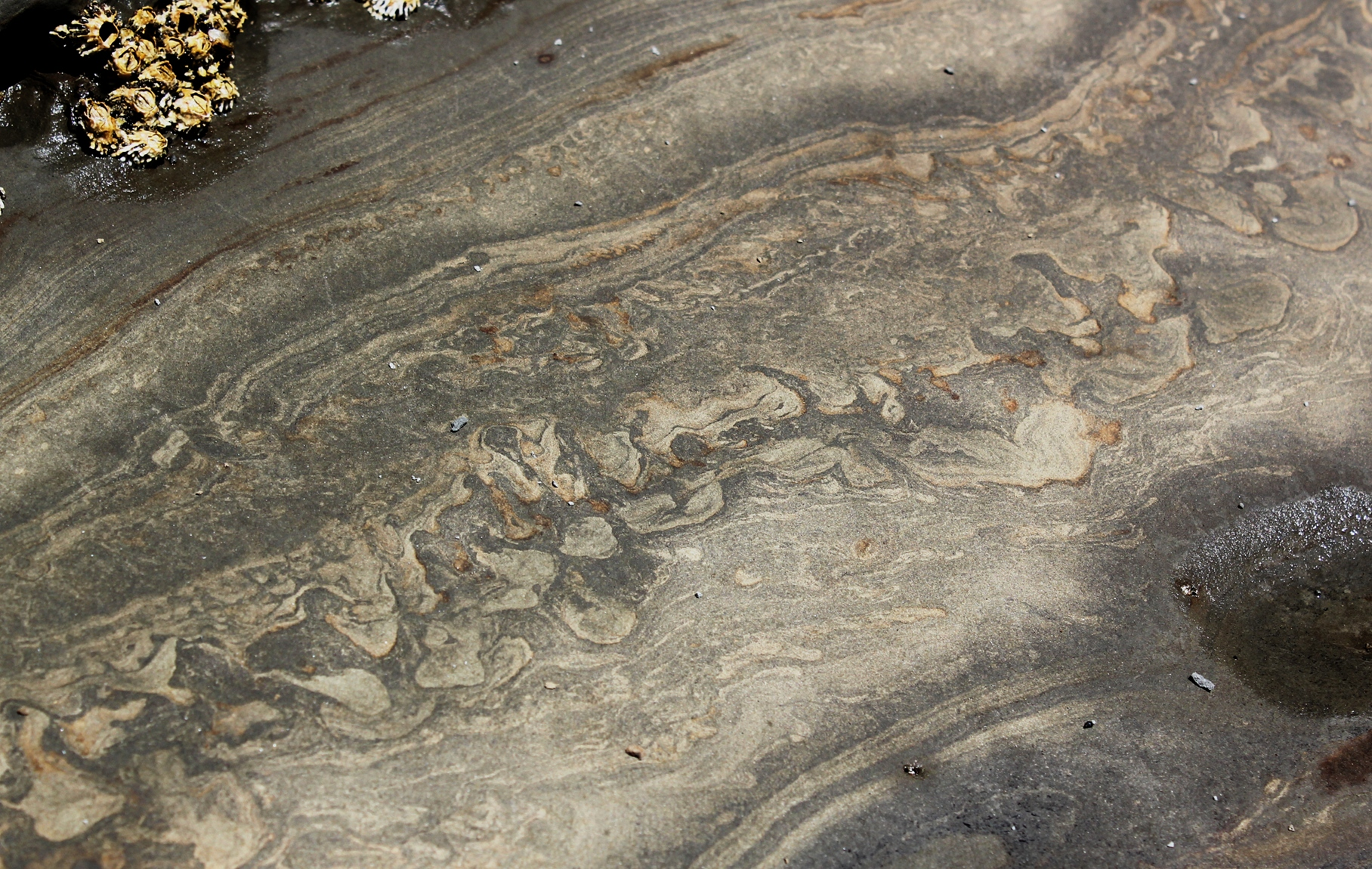
Flame structures in Waitemata Group sandstone, at Long Bay.

The Waitemata Group is an Early Miocene geologic group that is exposed in and around the Auckland Region of New Zealand, between the Whangarei Harbour in the North and the Raglan Harbour in the South. The Group is predominantly composed of deep water sandstone and mudstone (flysch). The sandstone dominated units form the cliffs around the Waitemata Harbour and rare more resistant conglomerates underlie some of Auckland's prominent ridges.

== Sub-units and deposition ==
The Waitemata Group was deposited within fault controlled basins. These were bounded to the North and South by up faulted Mesozoic basement sedimentary rocks and volcanic rocks to the East and West. The sedimentary source for the Group's sandstone is a mix of these basement sediments of the Waipapa Terrane and the mostly intermediate volcanic rocks. The maximum water depth of the Waitemata Group basin was 2,000 m.

The basal strata (Kawau Subgroup) are from the early Miocene (Otaian) and range in thickness from 10 to 45 m. These basal lithologies are varied and different from the overlying flyish basin. They overly the Te Kuiti Group sediments and the Mesozoic basement. This subgroup includes the Papakura Limestone, Tipakuri Sandstone Formation and the Cape Rodney Formation (greywacke conglomerate and breccia).

The Warkworth Subgroup is up to 1000m of inter-bedded sandstone and mudstone formed from turbidity currents. These accumulated in a bathyal submarine fan. The Meremere Subgroup is finer grained and represents a bathyal submarine fan and basin floor facies. The Waitemata Group is overlain by the volcanic and volcaniclastic Waitakere Group.

== Paleontology ==
The Group was once thought to extend from the Oligocene to the Early Miocene, however it is now confined exclusively to the Early Miocene. In the shallow water Kawau Subgroup at least 84 taxa have been identified, half of which were molluscs, however, corals and brachiopods were also found. The environment was inferred to be a rocky shore. Nereites trace fossils are common throughout the deeper water sequence.

== Deformation ==
The Waitemata Group formed during the emplacement of the Northland Allochthon and is sometimes inter-bedded with it. The Allochthon continued to move South during deposition some areas of the Waitemata Group are therefore extensively deformed.

== Geotechnical properties ==
The Waitemata Group forms steep rapidly eroding cliffs and it is recommended that building should be avoided near them. Landslides are commonly caused by bedding plan failure in weathered Waitemata Group sedimentary rock. This is particularly the case when bedding dips towards the prominent coastal cliffs formed by the group's sandstones.

== See also ==
- Geology of the Auckland Region
- Stratigraphy of New Zealand
