= Torbay, New Zealand =

Torbay
- Suburb
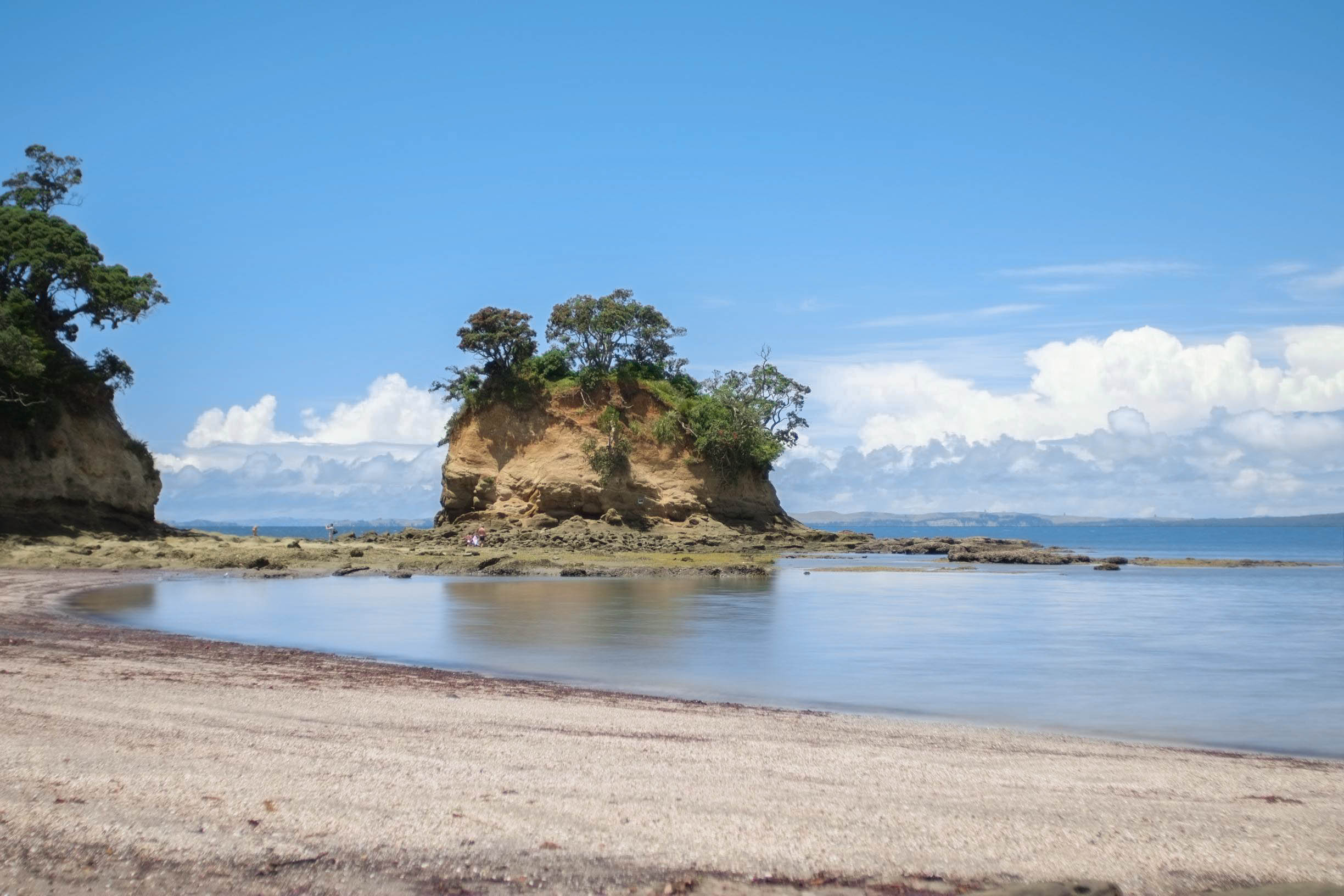
- Torbay beach
- Interactive map of Torbay
- Coordinates: 36°41′44″S 174°45′07″E
- Country: New Zealand
- City: Auckland
- Local authority: Auckland Council
- Electoral ward: Albany ward
- Local board: Hibiscus and Bays

Area
  - Land: 391 ha (970 acres)

Population (June 2025)
  - Total: 12,730
  - Density: 3,260/km^{2} (8,430/sq mi)
- Postcode: 0630

Dairy Flat	Long Bay	(Hauraki Gulf)
Torbay Heights	Torbay	(Hauraki Gulf)
Northcross	Waiake	(Hauraki Gulf)

Torbay is a northern suburb of Auckland, New Zealand. It is located in the upper East Coast Bays of the city's North Shore, and is governed by Auckland Council.

== Geography ==
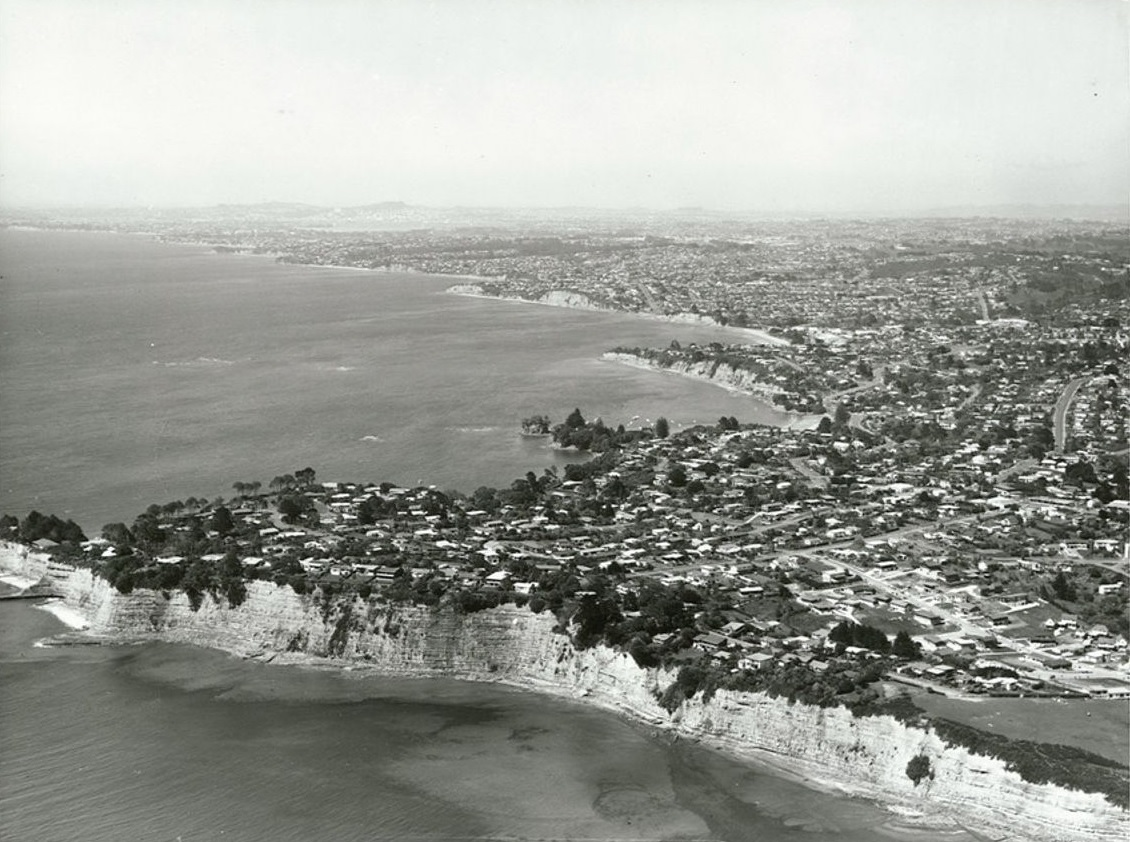
Aerial view of Torbay in 1977. Toroa Point / Gull Point is to the left, and the Tor can be seen in the centre of the photo

Torbay is a suburb of the North Shore of New Zealand. It is in the East Coast Bays area, between the suburbs of Long Bay and Waiake. The suburb has two major streams: Awaruku Creek in the north (also known as the Waikariwatoto Creek), and Deep Creek in the south. The eastern-most point of the suburb is called Toroa Point / Gull Point, and to the south of this is a bay named Winstones Cove.

The area inland from Torbay is occasionally known as Torbay Heights, or Tirohanga.

Torbay is also the name of the bay to the south-east of the suburb, located in Waiake. The bay has a recreational beach, Waiake Beach, which has a small coastal stack presque-isle known as the Tor. Long Bay-Okura Marine Reserve is a marine reserve that borders the north-east coast of Torbay.

The land at Torbay is primarily made up of Waitemata Group sandstone, which formed during the Miocene approximately 16 to 22 million years ago on the seafloor. Gradually, the seafloor was uplifted due to tectonic forces. Prior to human settlement, inland Torbay was primarily a northern broadleaf podocarp forest, dominated by tōtara, mataī, miro, kauri and kahikatea trees. Pōhutukawa trees were a major feature of the coastline. The Awaruku Bush Reserve is a remnant kahikatea forest, with the oldest trees in the reserve estimated to be over 650 years old.

== History ==
=== Māori history ===
Māori settlement of the Auckland Region began around the 13th or 14th centuries. The North Shore was settled by Tāmaki Māori, including people descended from the Tainui migratory canoe and ancestors of figures such as Taikehu and Peretū. During his arrival in New Zealand, Hoturoa, captain of the Tainui, guided the waka to the Waiake Lagoon (Deep Creek), which was a safe anchorage for the canoe.

Many of the early Tāmaki Māori people of the North Shore identified as Ngā Oho. While the poor soils of Torbay hindered dense settlement, traditional resources in the area included fish, shellfish and marine birds. The headland near the Tor at the south of Torbay is a known pā site.

The traditional name for the Torbay area is Waiake, meaning "Eternal Spring", referring to a pool upstream of Deep Creek known as a good location to catch kahawai. An alternative explanation of the name is that the name means "Waters of Akeake", referring to Dodonaea viscosa (akeake / broadleaf hopbush). The eastern headland of Torbay, Te Toroa, was the site of a defensive pā, and the mouth of Deep Creek is a kāinga site. Stone adzes have been found at the river mouth, and remains of waka and paddles have been found in Deep Creek. Lonely Track Road was an overland ara (pathway), linking the Lucas Creek in the north-western Waitematā Harbour to the streams of the east coast, such as the Awaruku Creek.

The warrior Maki migrated from the Kāwhia Harbour to his ancestral home in the Auckland Region, likely sometime in the 17th century. Maki conquered and unified many the Tāmaki Māori tribes as Te Kawerau ā Maki, including those of the North Shore. After Maki's death, his sons settled different areas of his lands, creating new hapū. His younger son Maraeariki settled the North Shore and Hibiscus Coast, who based himself at the head of the Ōrewa River. Maraeariki's daughter Kahu succeeded him, and she is the namesake of the North Shore, Te Whenua Roa o Kahu ("The Greater Lands of Kahu"), Many of the iwi of the North Shore, including Ngāti Manuhiri, Ngāti Maraeariki, Ngāti Kahu, Ngāti Poataniwha, Ngāi Tai Ki Tāmaki and Ngāti Whātua, can trace their lineage to Kahu.

By the 18th century, the Marutūāhu iwi Ngāti Paoa had expanded their influence to include the islands of the Hauraki Gulf and the North Shore. After periods of conflict, peace had been reached by the 1790s. The earliest contact with Europeans began in the late 18th century, which caused many Tāmaki Māori to die of rewharewha, respiratory diseases. During the early 1820s, most Māori of the North Shore fled for the Waikato or Northland due to the threat of war paries during the Musket Wars. Most people had returned by the late 1820s and 1830s.

A traditional story involving Torbay involves Moeroa, the beautiful daughter of a local chief. Moeroa used to sit on the cliffs of the Tor, where she sung with tūī and korimako, and wove mats. One day, the cliffs gave way and she fell to her death, after which the island became tapu. The events likely occurred in the early 19th century.

=== European settlement ===
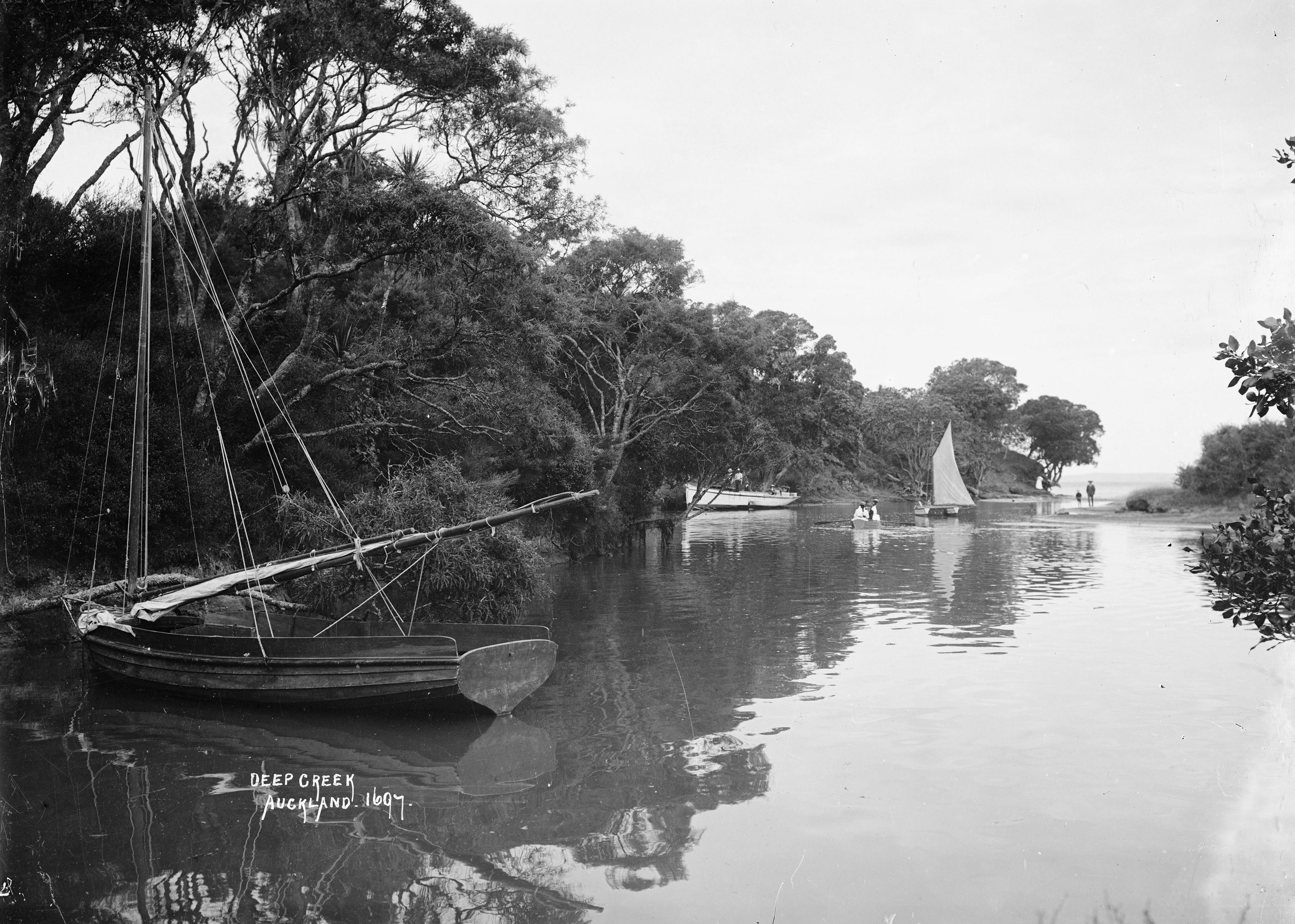
Pleasure boats along Deep Creek circa 1900

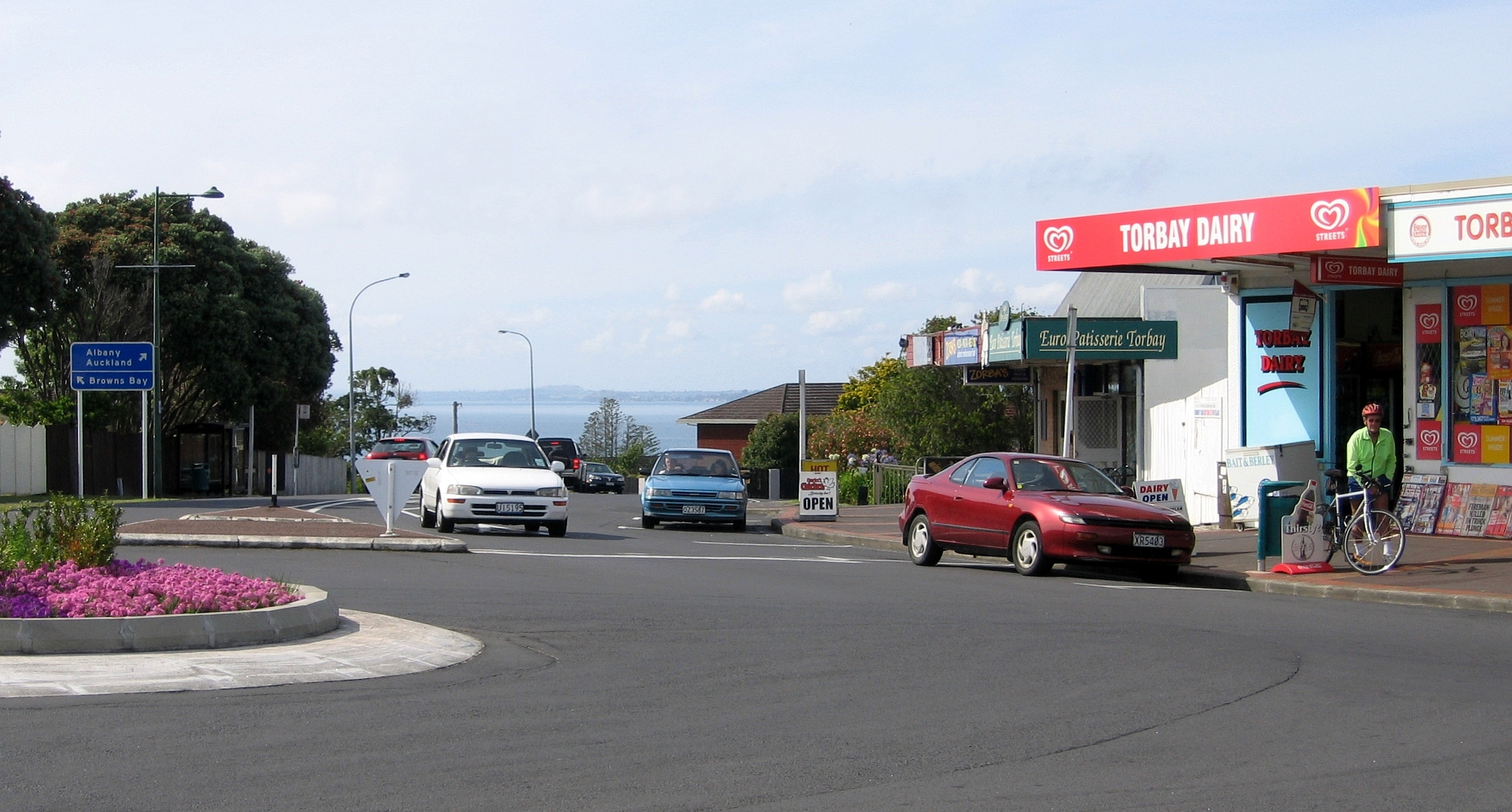
Torbay in 2014

In 1841, the Crown purchased the Mahurangi and Omaha blocks; an area that spanned from Takapuna to Te Ārai. The purchase involved some iwi with customary interests in the area, such as Ngāti Paoa, other Marutūāhu iwi and Ngāi Tai ki Tāmaki, but not others, such as Te Kawerau ā Maki or Ngāti Rango. The Crown spent until 1873 rectifying this sale, by making further deals with stakeholders.

The first European land owner in Torbay was John Logan Campbell, who purchased Allotment 189 (Ōkura to Browns Bay) in 1864, believing that there was coal in the area. The search for coal was unsuccessful, so Campbell sold the land in the 1870s. Early names for the area included McGowan's Beach, Rock Isle Beach, Oneroa Bay and Deep Creek. Around the year 1880, a British farmer, Mr. Long, purchased 200 acres of land around Torbay, naming his farm Rock Island and Waiake Beach Rock Isle Beach. After he died, his land was sold to Captain Charles Cholmondeley-Smith, who grew tobacco, until the market crashed and he established the Glenvar Wine Company. Cholmondeley-Smith's sons established a sawmill, where kauri logs from the Coromandel Peninsula were processed, and a flaxmill was established on the property.

In 1886 the first church in the area was constructed, an Anglican church called St Mary by the Sea, was constructed. Two years later, the first school in the area operated from the church. In 1897, the Oneroa post office was established at the Cholmondeley-Smith home, and the first post-mistress was Cholmondeley-Smith's daughter Kate. The first wharf was constructed circa 1880 by the Cholmondeley-Smith family, and ferries were the major means of transport well into the 1920s.

In 1915, Torbay was subdivided, and 57 sections were sold as the Deep Creek Estate. By the early 1930s, the area was primarily known as Deep Creek. Due to habitual problems with mail being sent to other areas of New Zealand called Oneroa, such as Oneroa on Waiheke Island or places in the South Island called Deep Creek, the post office's name was changed to Torbay in 1933. While it is unknown what the origin of the name is, it may be a reference to Torbay in Devon, England. During World War II, pillboxes were constructed in Torbay, at Gilberd Place and at the corner of Beach Road and Long Bay Drive.

Torbay developed as a suburban area of Auckland in the 1970s, after improvements were made to the Auckland Northern Motorway.

== Local government ==
From 1876 until 1954, the area was administered by the Waitemata County, a large rural county north and west of the city of Auckland. In 1954, the area split from the county, forming the East Coast Bays Borough Council, which became East Coast Bays City in 1975. In 1989, the city was merged into the North Shore City. North Shore City was amalgamated into Auckland Council in November 2010.

Within the Auckland Council, Torbay is a part of the Hibiscus and Bays local government area governed by the Hibiscus and Bays Local Board. It is a part of the Albany ward, which elects two councillors to the Auckland Council.

== Amenities ==
Torbay is home to both the Awaruku Bush Reserve and the Stredwick Reserve. Awaruku Bush Reserve is an area of kahikatea bush that was preserved in the 1960s, when the suburb expanded. The oldest kahikatea tree in the reserve is estimated as being over 650 years old. Inside the reserve is an old quarry, which was abandoned in the early 1900s.

Torbay is close to the Long Bay Regional Park, which attracts over a million visitors each year. There are also a number of smaller public beaches (Waiake, Torbay Beach, Winstone's Cove, Ladder Bay), which are highly accessible and utilised both for swimming, and mooring small yachts.

== Demographics ==
Torbay covers 3.91 km^{2} (1.51 sq mi) and had an estimated population of 12,730 as of June 2025, with a population density of 3,256 people per km^{2}.

Historical population
Year	Pop.	±% p.a.
2006	11,109	—
2013	11,361	+0.32%
2018	12,009	+1.12%
2023	12,069	+0.10%

Torbay had a population of 12,069 in the 2023 New Zealand census, an increase of 60 people (0.5%) since the 2018 census, and an increase of 708 people (6.2%) since the 2013 census. There were 5,949 males, 6,081 females and 42 people of other genders in 4,101 dwellings. 3.4% of people identified as LGBTIQ+. There were 2,316 people (19.2%) aged under 15 years, 2,199 (18.2%) aged 15 to 29, 5,874 (48.7%) aged 30 to 64, and 1,680 (13.9%) aged 65 or older.

People could identify as more than one ethnicity. The results were 76.5% European (Pākehā); 19.8% Asian; 6.3% Māori; 2.8% Pasifika; 2.2% Middle Eastern, Latin American and African New Zealanders (MELAA); and 2.5% other, which includes people giving their ethnicity as "New Zealander". English was spoken by 94.3%, Māori language by 1.3%, Samoan by 0.2%, and other languages by 26.8%. No language could be spoken by 2.0% (e.g. too young to talk). New Zealand Sign Language was known by 0.3%. The percentage of people born overseas was 48.3, compared with 28.8% nationally.

Religious affiliations were 31.8% Christian, 0.9% Hindu, 0.8% Islam, 0.3% Māori religious beliefs, 1.1% Buddhist, 0.5% New Age, 0.2% Jewish, and 1.2% other religions. People who answered that they had no religion were 56.9%, and 6.3% of people did not answer the census question.

Of those at least 15 years old, 2,586 (26.5%) people had a bachelor's or higher degree, 4,395 (45.1%) had a post-high school certificate or diploma, and 1,935 (19.8%) people exclusively held high school qualifications. 1,800 people (18.5%) earned over $100,000 compared to 12.1% nationally. The employment status of those at least 15 was that 5,430 (55.7%) people were employed full-time, 1,425 (14.6%) were part-time, and 225 (2.3%) were unemployed.

Individual statistical areas
Name	Area (km^{2})	Population	Density (per km^{2})	Dwellings	Median age	Median income
Awaruku	1.29	3,513	2,723	1,149	39.9 years	$50,400
Torbay West	0.80	2,826	3,533	957	38.9 years	$47,700
Torbay East	0.87	2,427	2,790	897	43.6 years	$49,800
Glamorgan	0.96	3,303	3,441	1,098	36.6 years	$50,800
New Zealand					38.1 years	$41,500

== Education ==
Torbay Primary School is a coeducational contributing primary (years 1 - 6) school with a roll of 575 students as at July 2026. It was established in 1954. In 2019, students of Torbay School taught younger tamariki Te Reo and sign language during Te Wiki o te Reo Māori (Māori Language Week).

Glamorgan School is a coeducational contributing primary (years 1-6) school with a roll of 493 students as of July 2026. Glamorgan Kindergarten (preschool) is down the road near Glamorgan School, and has 61 students as of March 2020.

== Notable residents ==
- Bill Airey (1897–1968), historian.
- Elaine Gurr (1896–1996), doctor and advocate for general practice.
- Christina McDonald (1911–1996), New Zealand nurse in World War II and Director of Nursing Services for the New Zealand Defence Force from 1958 to 1964.

== Bibliography ==
- Cass, David (1989). ECB – the Years to 1989. East Coast Bays City Council.
- Sheehan, Vanessa (2019). An Almost Complete History of the East Coast Bays.
- Stone, R. C. J. (2001). From Tamaki-makau-rau to Auckland. Auckland University Press. ISBN 1869402596.
- Willis, Jenny (2018). Early History of East Coast Bays (Second ed.).
