= Waiake =

- Suburb
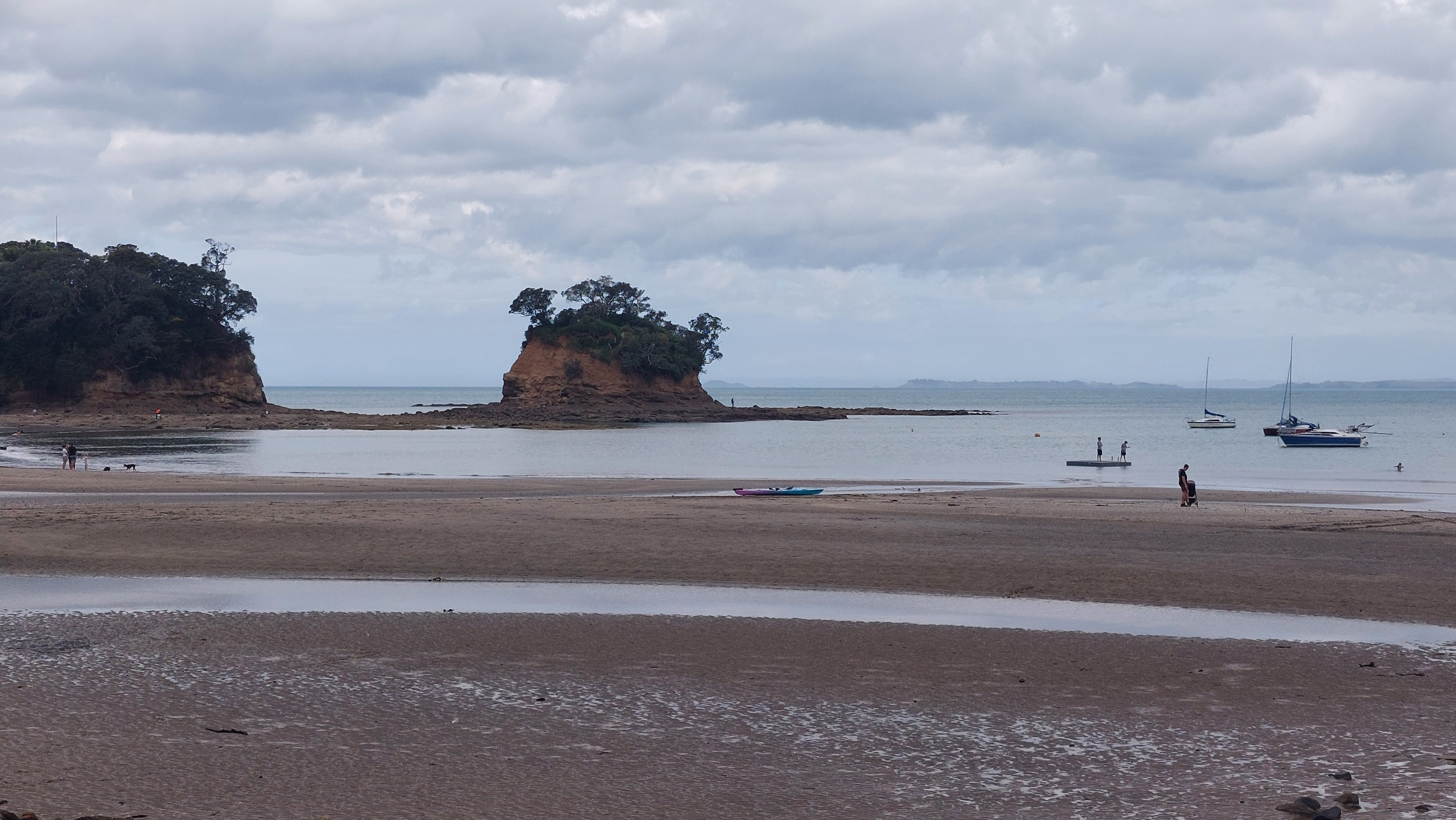
- Waiake Beach and The Tor
- Interactive map of Waiake
- Coordinates: 36.7071°S 174.7497°E
- Country: New Zealand
- City: Auckland
- Local authority: Auckland Council
- Electoral ward: Albany
- Local board: Hibiscus and Bays

Area
  - Land: 125 ha (310 acres)

Population (June 2025)
  - Total: 4,080
  - Density: 3,260/km^{2} (8,450/sq mi)
- Postcode: 0630

Torbay Heights	Torbay	Hauraki Gulf
Northcross	Waiake	Hauraki Gulf
Northcross	Browns Bay	Hauraki Gulf

Waiake is one of the northernmost suburbs of the North Shore, in Auckland, New Zealand. It is located in the East Coast Bays between the suburbs of Browns Bay to the south and Torbay to the north. It has a beach (named Waiake Beach), which looks out to the Tor, a presque-isle at the north end of the beach that becomes an island at high tide. Waiake is under the local governance of the Auckland Council.

== Geography ==
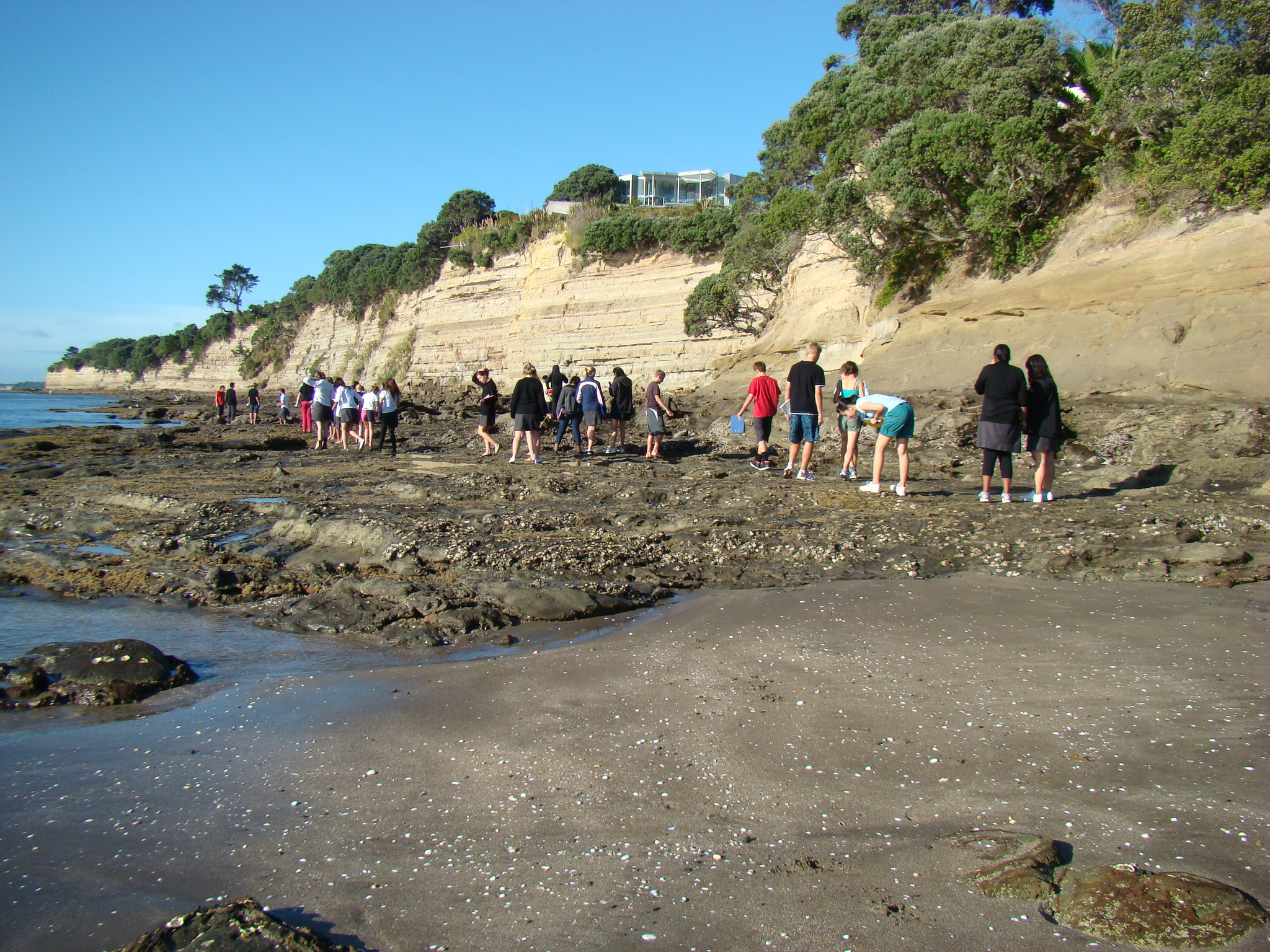
A biology trip to the Waitemata Group sandstone cliffs south of Waiake Beach

Waiake is a suburb of North Shore in Auckland, New Zealand, adjacent to Waiake Beach. It is in the East Coast Bays area, surrounded by Torbay, New Zealand to the north and west, and Browns Bay to the south. Deep Creek is a stream along the border between Torbay and Waiake that flows eastwards into Waiake Beach.

The bay to the east of the suburb is called Torbay, which has a small coastal stack presque-isle known as the Tor. The south-eastern headland of the suburb is called Tipau Point.

The land at Torbay is primarily made up of Waitemata Group sandstone, which formed during the Miocene approximately 16 to 22 million years ago on the seafloor. Gradually, the seafloor was uplifted due to tectonic forces. Prior to human settlement, pōhutukawa trees were a major feature of Waiake.

== History ==
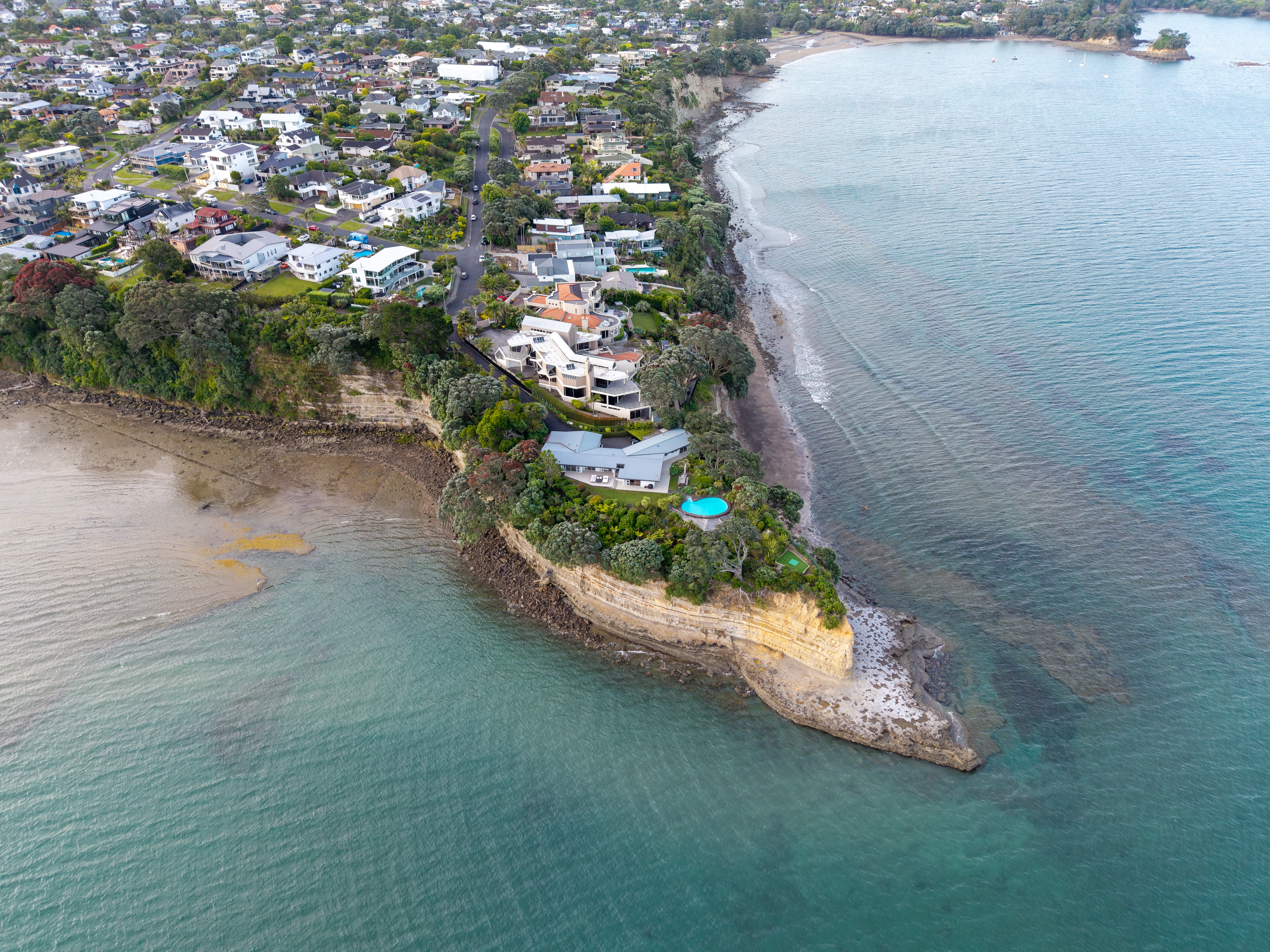
Tipau Point between Waiake and Browns Bay was the location of Ōmangaia, a defensive headland pā in the 18th century

=== Māori history ===
Māori settlement of the Auckland Region began around the 13th or 14th centuries. The North Shore was settled by Tāmaki Māori, including people descended from the Tainui migratory canoe and ancestors of figures such as Taikehu and Peretū. During his arrival in New Zealand, Hoturoa, captain of the Tainui, guided the waka to the Waiake Lagoon (Deep Creek), which was a safe anchorage for the canoe.

Many of the early Tāmaki Māori people of the North Shore identified as Ngā Oho. While the poor soils of the upper North Shore hindered dense settlement, traditional resources in the area included fish, shellfish and marine birds. The headland near the Tor to the east of Waiake is a known pā site.

The traditional name for the wider Torbay area is Waiake, meaning "Eternal Spring", referring to a pool upstream of Deep Creek known as a good location to catch kahawai. An alternative explanation of the name is that the name means "Waters of Akeake", referring to Dodonaea viscosa (akeake / broadleaf hopbush). The mouth of Deep Creek is a kāinga site. Stone adzes have been found at the river mouth, and remains of waka and paddles have been found in Deep Creek. Lonely Track Road was an overland ara (pathway), linking the Lucas Creek in the north-western Waitematā Harbour to the streams of the east coast, such as the Awaruku Creek.

The warrior Maki migrated from the Kāwhia Harbour to his ancestral home in the Auckland Region, likely sometime in the 17th century. Maki conquered and unified many the Tāmaki Māori tribes as Te Kawerau ā Maki, including those of the North Shore. After Maki's death, his sons settled different areas of his lands, creating new hapū. His younger son Maraeariki settled the North Shore and Hibiscus Coast, who based himself at the head of the Ōrewa River. Maraeariki's daughter Kahu succeeded him, and she is the namesake of the North Shore, Te Whenua Roa o Kahu ("The Greater Lands of Kahu"), Many of the iwi of the North Shore, including Ngāti Manuhiri, Ngāti Maraeariki, Ngāti Kahu, Ngāti Poataniwha, Ngāi Tai Ki Tāmaki and Ngāti Whātua, can trace their lineage to Kahu.

By the 18th century, the Marutūāhu iwi Ngāti Paoa had expanded their influence to include the islands of the Hauraki Gulf and the North Shore. During these events in the latter 18th century, Tipau Point to the east of Browns Bay was the location of Ōmangaia Pā, a defensive pā site associated with the Ngāti Tai Manawaiti chief, Te Hehewa. After periods of conflict, peace had been reached by the 1790s. The earliest contact with Europeans began in the late 18th century, which caused many Tāmaki Māori to die of rewharewha, respiratory diseases. During the early 1820s, most Māori of the North Shore fled for the Waikato or Northland due to the threat of war parties during the Musket Wars. Most people had returned by the late 1820s and 1830s.

A traditional story involving the Tor at Waiake involves Moeroa, the beautiful daughter of a local chief. Moeroa used to sit on the cliffs of the Tor, where she sung with tūī and korimako, and wove mats. One day, the cliffs gave way and she fell to her death, after which the island became tapu. The events likely occurred in the early 19th century.

=== European settlement ===
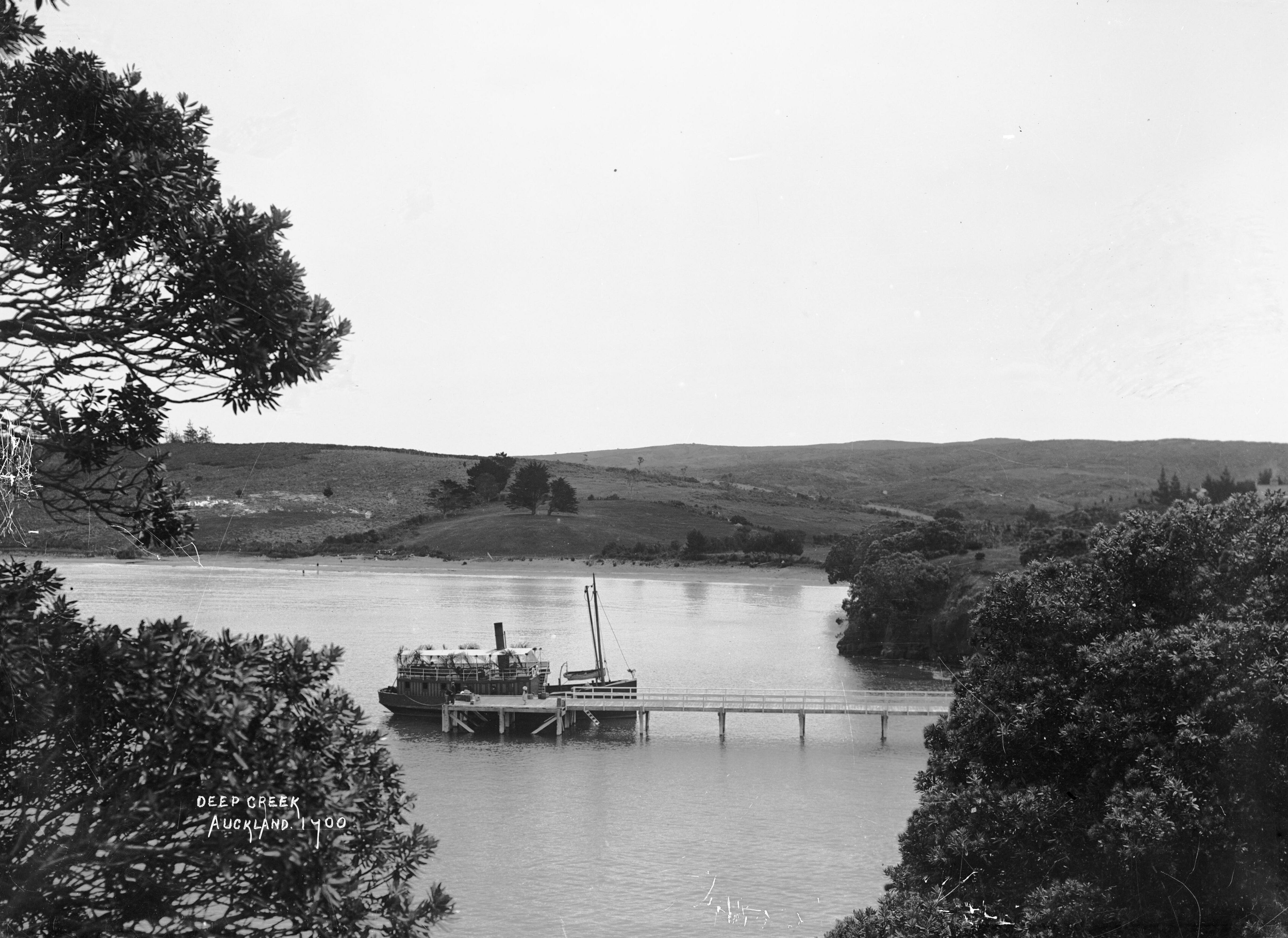
Ferry steamer at Waiake Beach, ca 1910

In 1841, the Crown purchased the Mahurangi and Omaha blocks; an area that spanned from Takapuna to Te Ārai. The purchase involved some iwi with customary interests in the area, such as Ngāti Paoa, other Marutūāhu iwi and Ngāi Tai ki Tāmaki, but not others, such as Te Kawerau ā Maki or Ngāti Rango. The Crown spent until 1873 rectifying this sale, by making further deals with stakeholders.

The first European land owner in Waiake was John Logan Campbell, who purchased Allotment 189 (Ōkura to Browns Bay) in 1864, believing that there was coal in the area. The search for coal was unsuccessful, so Campbell sold the land in the 1870s. Early names for the area included McGowan's Beach, Rock Isle Beach, Oneroa Bay and Deep Creek. Around the year 1880, a British farmer, Mr. Long, purchased 200 acres of land around Waiake and Torbay, naming his farm Rock Island and Waiake Beach Rock Isle Beach. After he died, his land was sold to Captain Charles Cholmondeley-Smith, who grew tobacco, until the market crashed and he established the Glenvar Wine Company. Cholmondeley-Smith's sons established a sawmill, where kauri logs from the Coromandel Peninsula were processed, and a flaxmill was established on the property.

The first wharf on Waiake Beach was constructed circa 1880 by the Cholmondeley-Smith family, and ferries were the major means of transport well into the 1920s. Waiake Beach became known as McGowan's Beach in the early 20th century, after Scottish resident Anstruther McGowan, who periodically lived in Waiake between 1908 and 1936.

== Local government ==
From 1876 until 1954, the area was administered by the Waitemata County, a large rural county north and west of the city of Auckland. In 1954, the area split from the county, forming the East Coast Bays Borough Council, which became East Coast Bays City in 1975. In 1989, the city was merged into the North Shore City. North Shore City was amalgamated into Auckland Council in November 2010.

Within the Auckland Council, Waiake is a part of the Hibiscus and Bays local government area governed by the Hibiscus and Bays Local Board. It is a part of the Albany ward, which elects two councillors to the Auckland Council.

== Amenities ==
- Waiake Beach, and the adjacent Waiake Beach Reserve. The Torbay Sailing Club, established in 1959, is located adjacent to the beach.
- Waiake / Aickin Reserve, an open reserve on the shores of Deep Creek.

== Demographics ==
Waiake covers 1.25 km^{2} (0.48 sq mi) and had an estimated population of 4,080 as of June 2025, with a population density of 3,264 people per km^{2}.

Historical population
Year	Pop.	±% p.a.
2006	3,615	—
2013	3,720	+0.41%
2018	3,885	+0.87%
2023	3,912	+0.14%

Waiake had a population of 3,912 in the 2023 New Zealand census, an increase of 27 people (0.7%) since the 2018 census, and an increase of 192 people (5.2%) since the 2013 census. There were 1,920 males, 1,983 females and 12 people of other genders in 1,338 dwellings. 2.5% of people identified as LGBTIQ+. The median age was 40.1 years (compared with 38.1 years nationally). There were 771 people (19.7%) aged under 15 years, 642 (16.4%) aged 15 to 29, 1,908 (48.8%) aged 30 to 64, and 591 (15.1%) aged 65 or older.

People could identify as more than one ethnicity. The results were 75.8% European (Pākehā); 6.4% Māori; 1.8% Pasifika; 20.6% Asian; 2.6% Middle Eastern, Latin American and African New Zealanders (MELAA); and 1.8% other, which includes people giving their ethnicity as "New Zealander". English was spoken by 94.1%, Māori language by 1.2%, Samoan by 0.2%, and other languages by 26.8%. No language could be spoken by 2.2% (e.g. too young to talk). New Zealand Sign Language was known by 0.4%. The percentage of people born overseas was 47.0, compared with 28.8% nationally.

Religious affiliations were 30.1% Christian, 1.1% Hindu, 1.0% Islam, 0.1% Māori religious beliefs, 1.2% Buddhist, 0.2% New Age, 0.5% Jewish, and 0.6% other religions. People who answered that they had no religion were 59.5%, and 5.8% of people did not answer the census question.

Of those at least 15 years old, 879 (28.0%) people had a bachelor's or higher degree, 1,353 (43.1%) had a post-high school certificate or diploma, and 666 (21.2%) people exclusively held high school qualifications. The median income was $51,900, compared with $41,500 nationally. 639 people (20.3%) earned over $100,000 compared to 12.1% nationally. The employment status of those at least 15 was that 1,740 (55.4%) people were employed full-time, 435 (13.8%) were part-time, and 66 (2.1%) were unemployed.

== Bibliography ==
- Cass, David (1989). ECB – the Years to 1989. East Coast Bays City Council.
- Sheehan, Vanessa (2019). An Almost Complete History of the East Coast Bays.
- Stone, R. C. J. (2001). From Tamaki-makau-rau to Auckland. Auckland University Press. ISBN 1869402596.
- Willis, Jenny (2018). Early History of East Coast Bays (Second ed.).
