= Elaine Gurr =

New Zealand doctor and medical administrator

- Born: Eily Elaine Gurr; 8 November 1896; Wellington, New Zealand
- Died: 12 December 1996 (aged 100)
- Education: University of Otago
- Known for: made endowments to create two university chairs in general practice

Eily Elaine Gurr (8 November 1896 – 12 December 1996) was a New Zealand medical doctor, medical administrator and advocate of general practice.

== Early life and education ==
Gurr was born in Wellington, New Zealand, on 8 November 1896, but grew up in Wellington and Dannevirke. She was educated at Woodford House and Wellington Girls' College.

Gurr graduated from the University of Otago with MB ChB degrees in 1923.

== Career ==
Gurr's first position was as a house surgeon at Timaru Hospital. She then left New Zealand to do post-graduate training in midwifery in Dublin at the Rotunda Hospital and Coombe Hospital. This was followed by further training in ante-natal care at the Royal Free Hospital and Chelsea Hospital in London. On the invitation of Thomas Valintine, Director General of Health and Maui Pōmare, the Minister of Health, she joined the New Zealand Department of Health in 1924 and was charged with setting up ante-natal clinics at St Helens Hospitals and other maternity hospitals. In the next three years she set up 20 public ante-natal clinics and trained nurses and midwives in ante-natal care. This was part of an initiative to improve maternity care.

In 1929 she was appointed medical superintendent of the Matakaoa Hospital in Te Araroa. There she performed surgical, medical and maternity care, often attending calls to patients on horseback due to lack of roading in the rural areas.

Gurr moved to Auckland in 1932 setting up a private practice which specialised in obstetrics and gynaecology. Her practice at 84 Symonds St was located close to many other medical practices and she remained there for 30 years. The house which served as her residence and consulting rooms was designed on commission by architect Malcolm Draffin and was built from 1935 to 1936. The medical rooms were at the front of the house on the ground floor while the rear ground floor and upper floor were Gurr's private rooms. The house was in Neo-Georgian style and in 1937 Draffin designed a similar house at 86 Symonds St for GP Dr Alexander Kirker. The houses, which are now joined, are protected by Heritage New Zealand with a Category 2 rating, and designated as a historic place on the Auckland Unitary Plan.

Gurr received an honorary appointment as assistant physician at Auckland Hospital in 1935. She returned to Europe for further postgraduate training in endocrinology after WWII. On the return voyage to New Zealand in 1946 she took a position as ship's doctor on the Port Philip.

Gurr was an advocate for general practice and for the role the general practitioner played in family welfare. She believed "that general practitioners are the guardians of families in New Zealand" and "that the general practitioner should be more than a medical advisor and be able to provide wide counsel and assistance in a diversity of areas". She became an honorary fellow of the Royal New Zealand College of General Practitioners in 1983.

She was a supporter of St John Ambulance and had an interest in animal hospitals and veterinary work. She was a life member of the Society for the Prevention of Cruelty to Animals (SPCA).

Gurr died at her home in Torbay, Auckland on 12 December 1996, aged 100.

== Legacy ==
Gurr endowed two chairs in general practice to strengthen the discipline of general practice: one at the University of Otago in 1983 and one at the University of Auckland in 1988. She also endowed a ward at a Salvation Army rest home in Browns Bay, Auckland.
