= Winstones Cove, Auckland =

Winstones Cove
- Cove
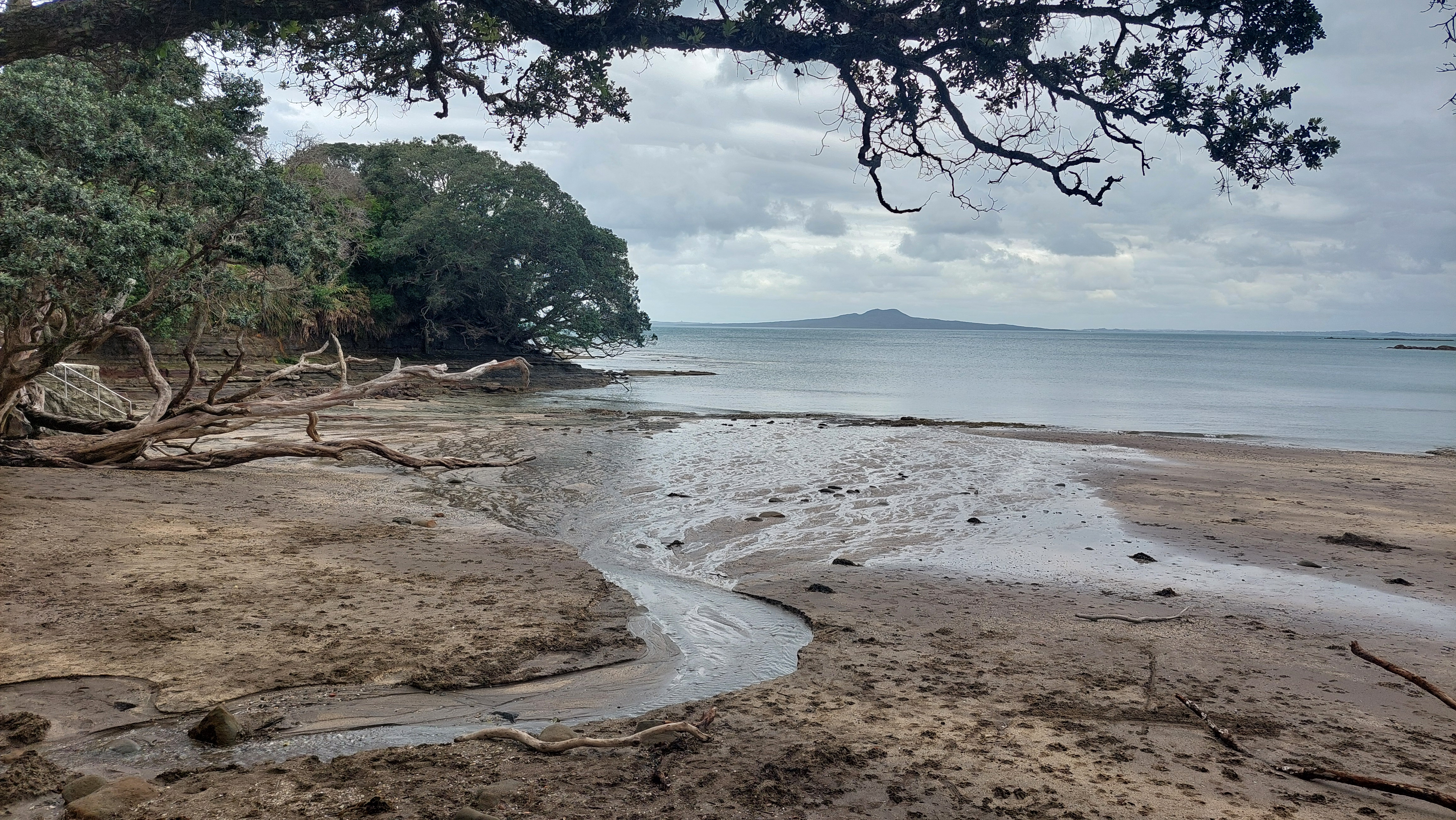
- Beach at low tide
- Interactive map of Winstones Cove
- Coordinates (Beach): 36.69819°S 174.75019°E
- Named for: Percy and Violet Winstone

Winstones Cove is a bight between Waiake Beach and Toroa Point on the East Coast Bays, Auckland, New Zealand.

== History ==
The cove, along with the rest of the East Coast Bays, was part of the disputed 1841 Mahurangi Block purchase of extensive Northern Māori land by the Crown, containing coastline stretching from Takapuna to Te Ārai Point.

During New Zealand's prohibition, illegal brewing and transport of moonshine occurred around the East Coast Bays. Tracks leading to Winstone's cove were named "Revenue Run" and "Moonshine run" for this reason.

Notable early North Shore settler Captain Charles Ross Cholmondeley-Smith owned land in Torbay, and built a boarding house at the Cove.

Winstones

In 1925 Percy and Violet Winstone purchased four acres of land and Smith's boarding house as a holiday cottage, thus giving Winstones Cove its name. Percy Winstone (1880–1948), also known as William Percy Winstone, was the son of George Winstone, co-founder of Winstones Ltd. Having the same first name as his uncle William Winstone, he was known as Percy. He joined the family company in 1897, and went on to become a founding director in 1904. Violet Winstone (née James), was an early New Zealand female amateur filmmaker, and some of her works were filmed at their Winstones Cove cottage.

=== Shipwreck ===
In 1937, the Rangi, a scow transporting logs from Tauranga to Auckland, capsized off Rākino Island in the Hauraki Gulf. Fourteen-year old passenger Donald Woodroffe of Epsom washed up at Winstones Cove, along with a lifebelt and wreck of the boat's dinghy. Woodroffe escaped with only an injured arm, and was one of two survivors out of the 6 man crew.

=== Later occupants ===
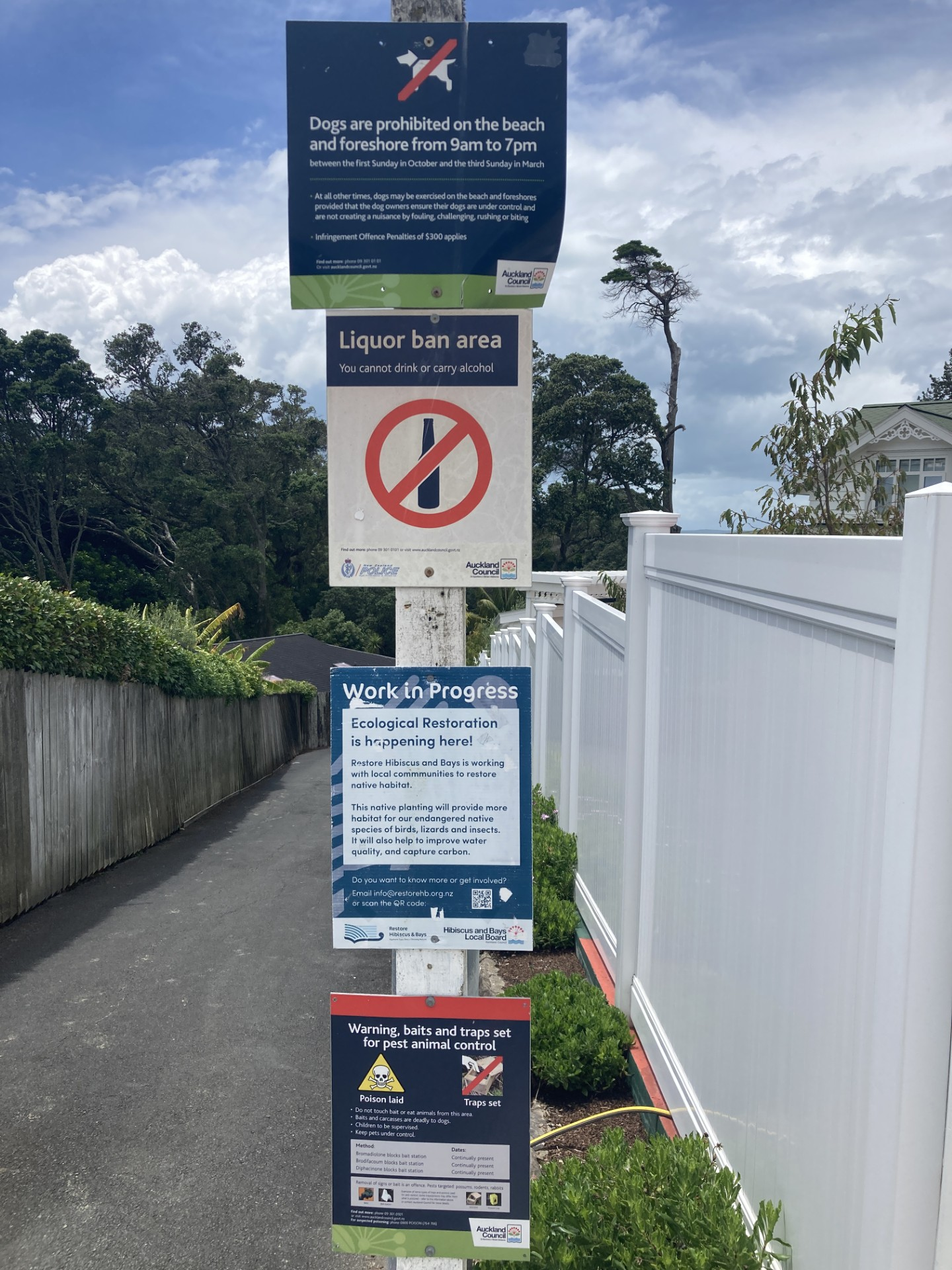
Signage at Winstones Cove

The holiday cottage was sold in the 1950s after the deaths of Percy and Violet Winstone. It was owned by Professor Cyril Roy Knight, the first professor of Architecture in New Zealand, who altered some elements of the house's design. The cottage returned to Winstone family ownership in the 1970s before being sold on, and further altered and extended in the 1990s.

== Amenities ==
As of 2026, the beach is accessible via Gray Crescent, Torbay, with road parking available. It is a small beach, popular with locals for fishing, swimming, sailing and picnicking.

== Further Links ==
- Photograph of the Rangi washed up on Torbay beach (next to Winstones Cove) circa 1937
- Online Cenotaph record of Donald Woodroffe
- Auckland Council report on the historic significance of the Winstone Holiday Cottage
- Auckland Council Winstones Cove 'About' page

== Gallery ==
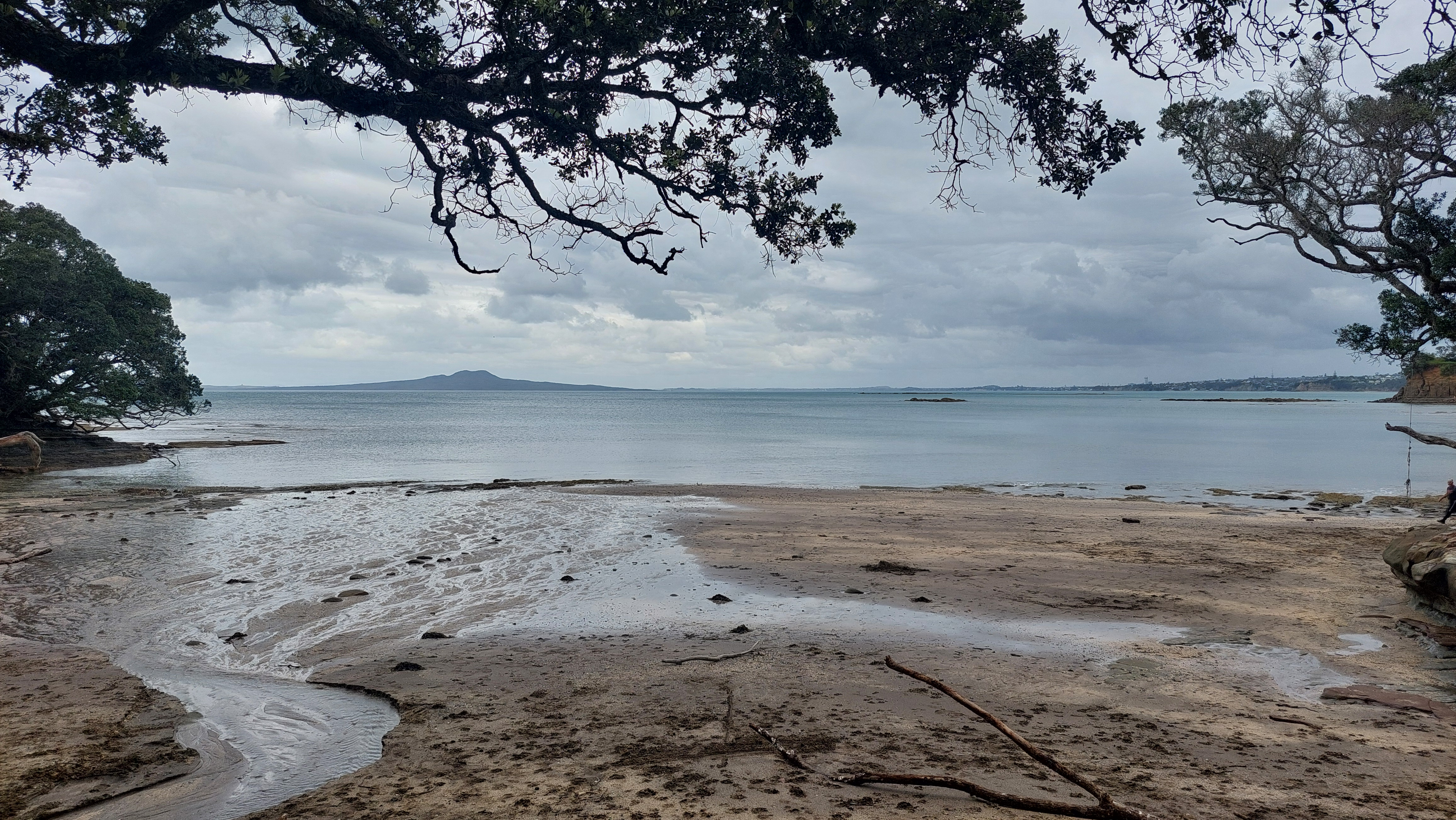

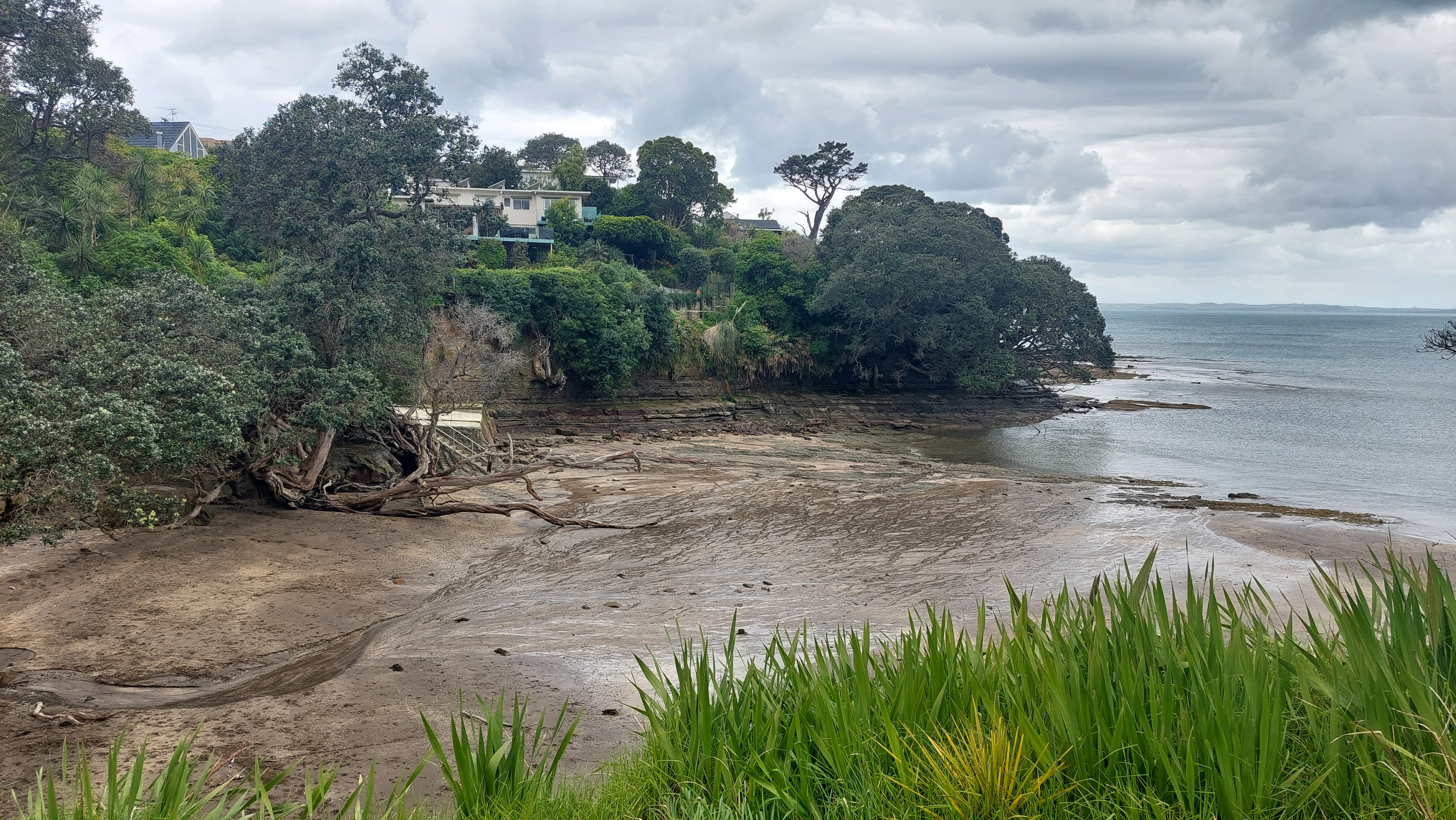

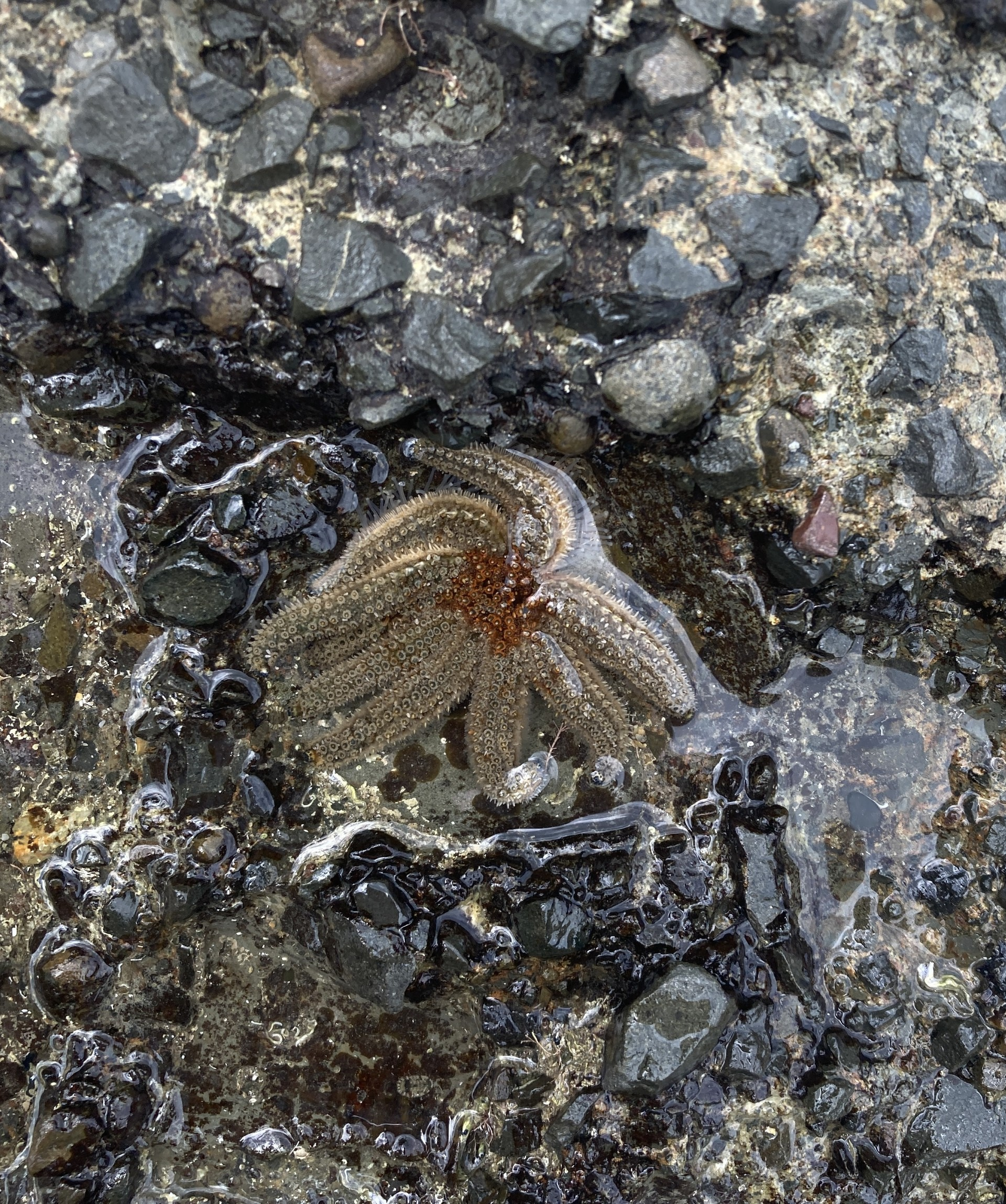

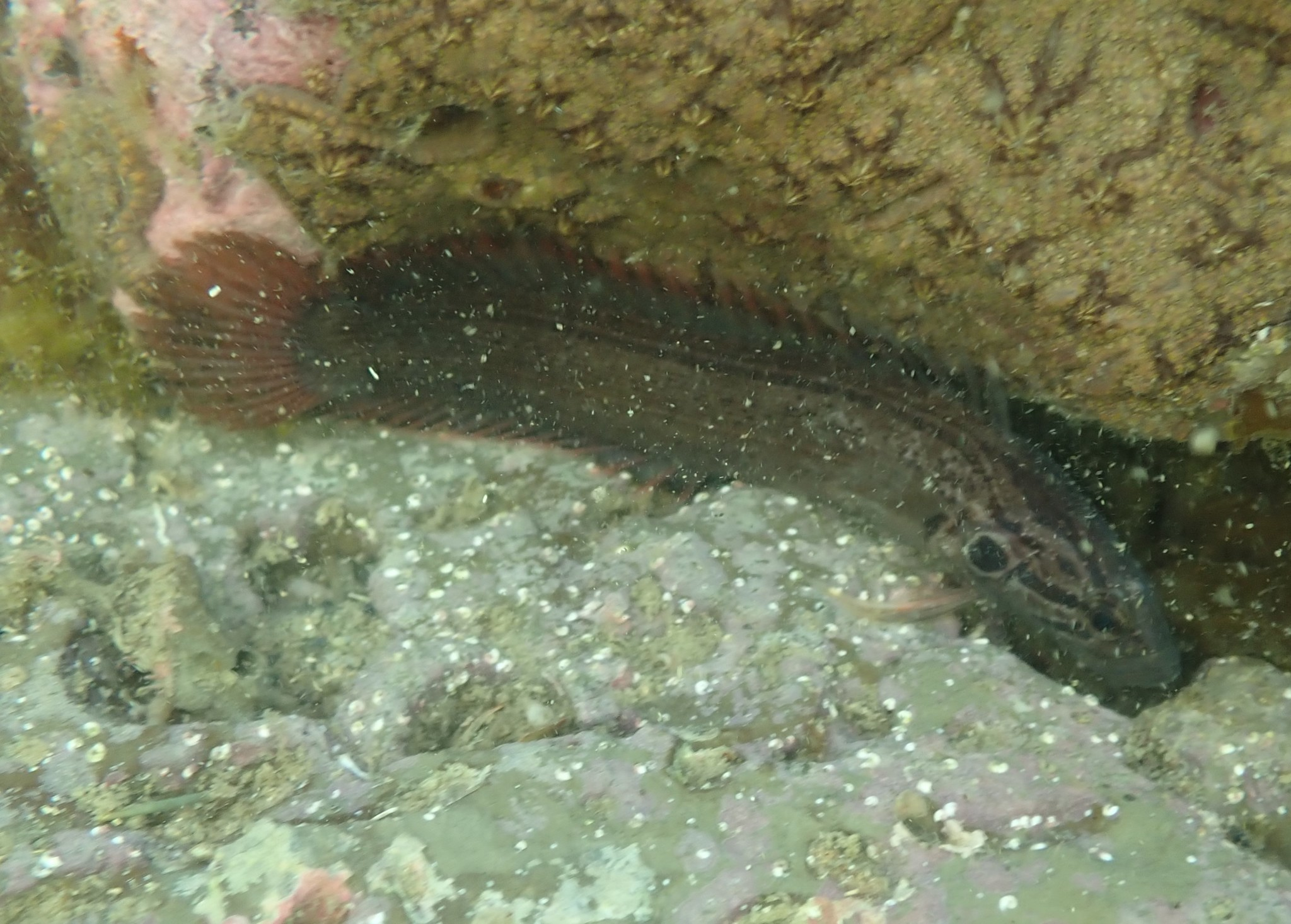

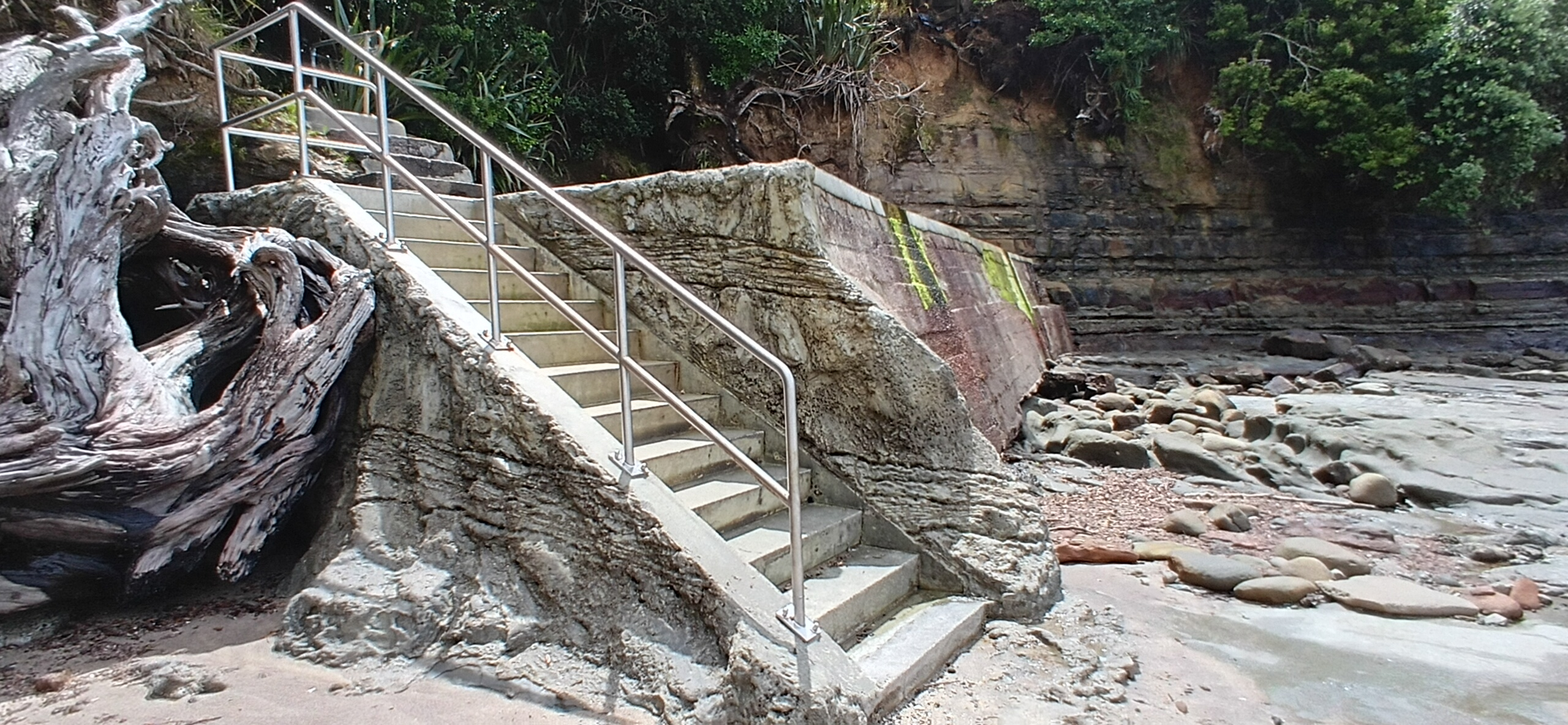

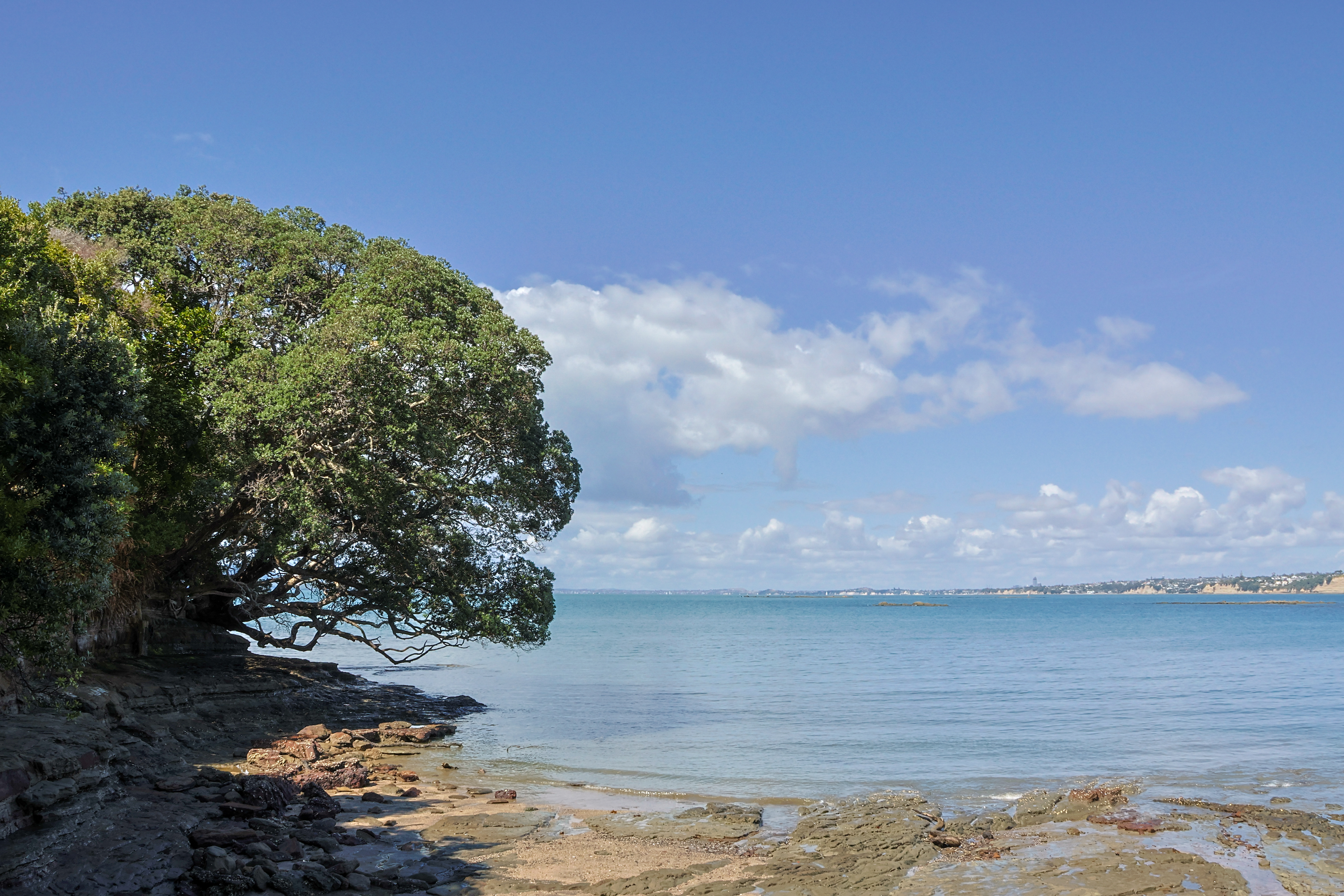

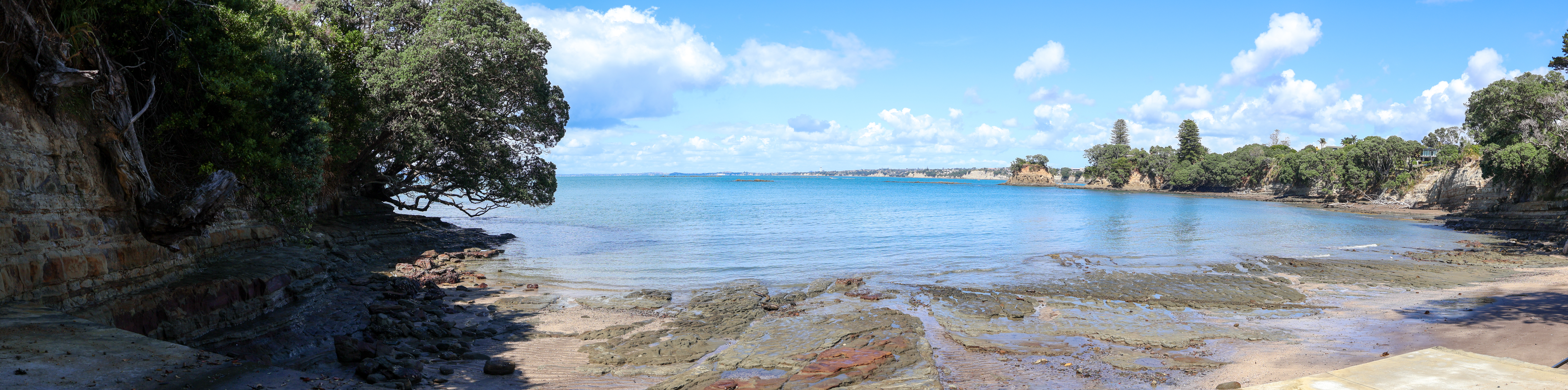

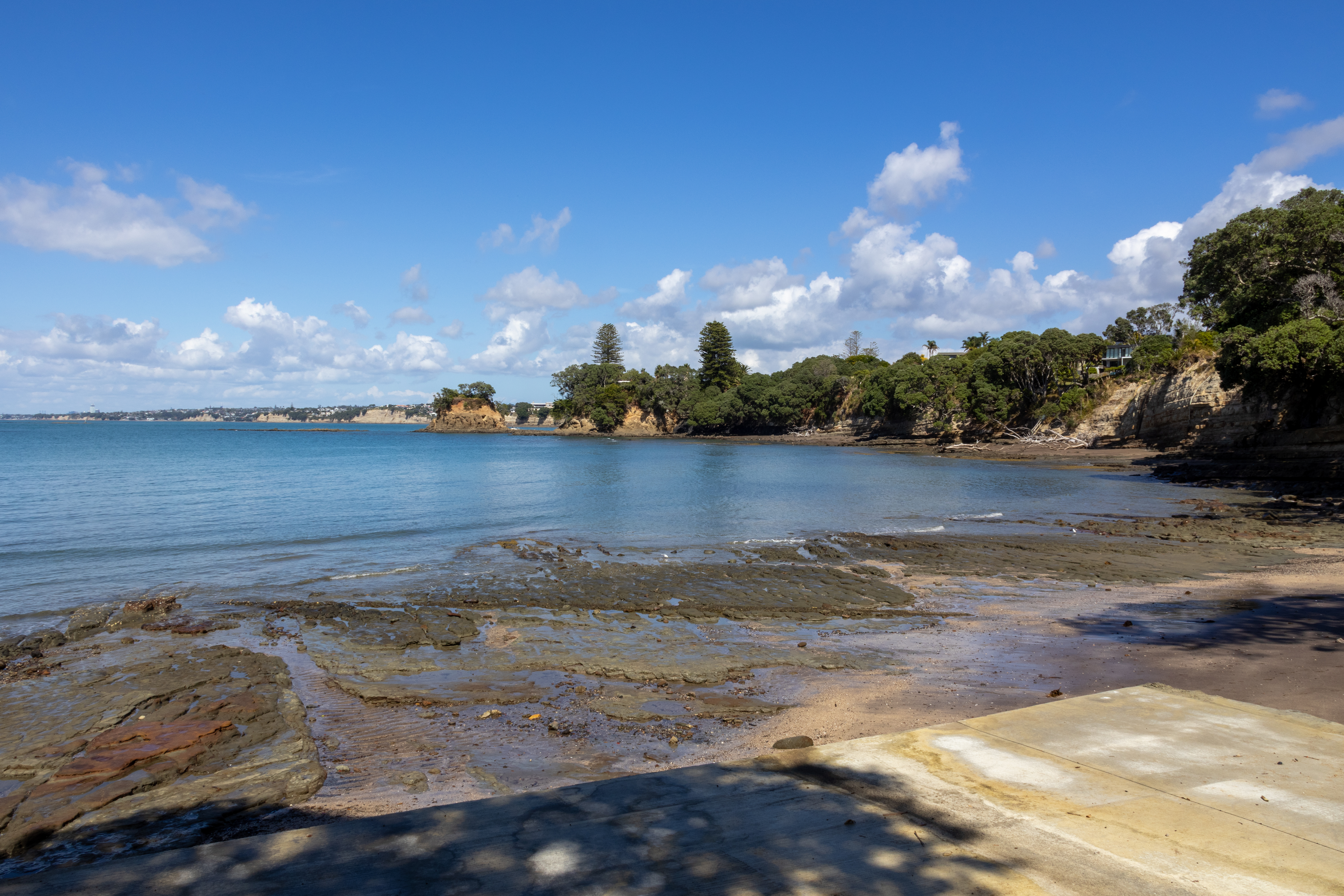

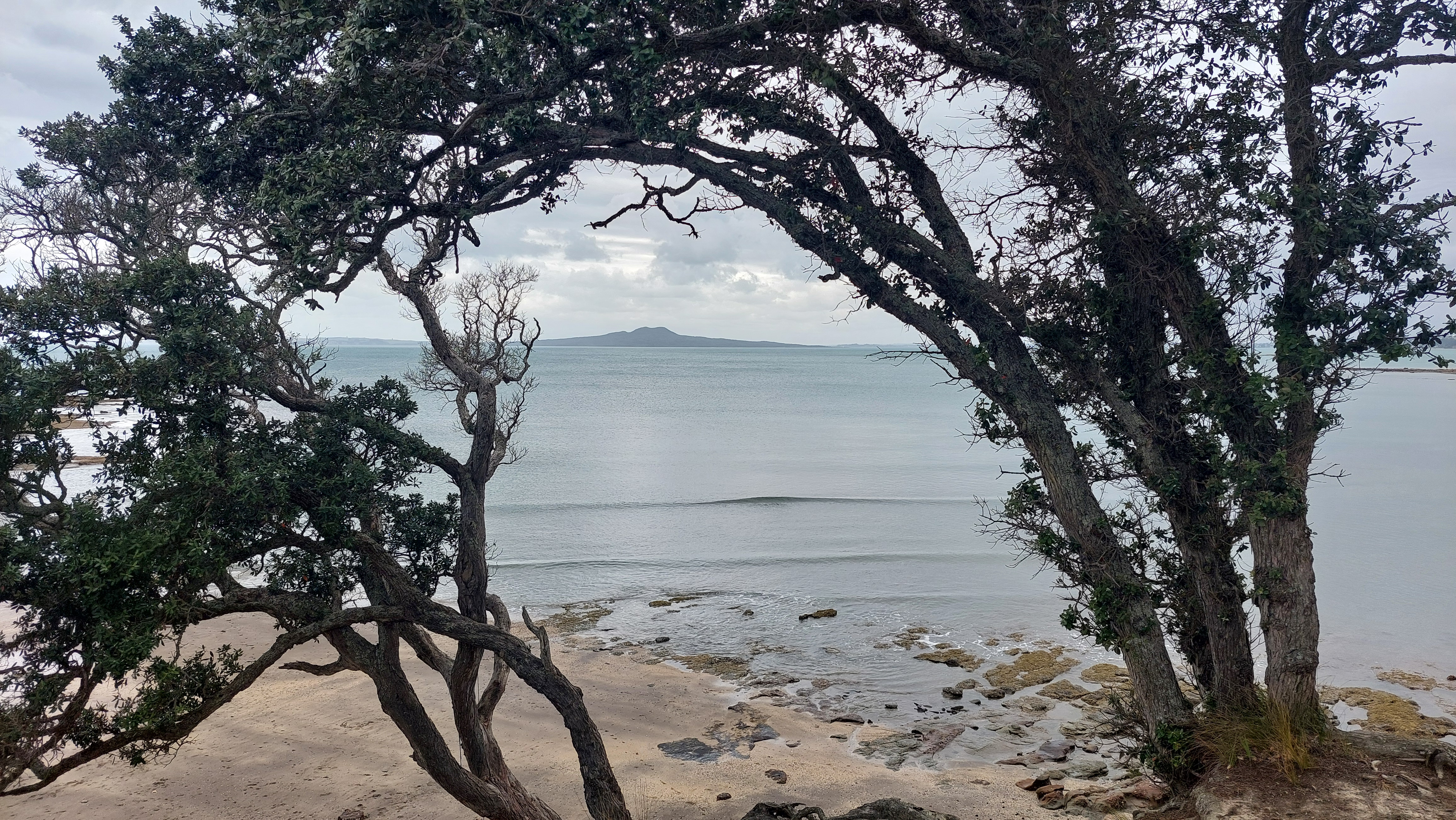

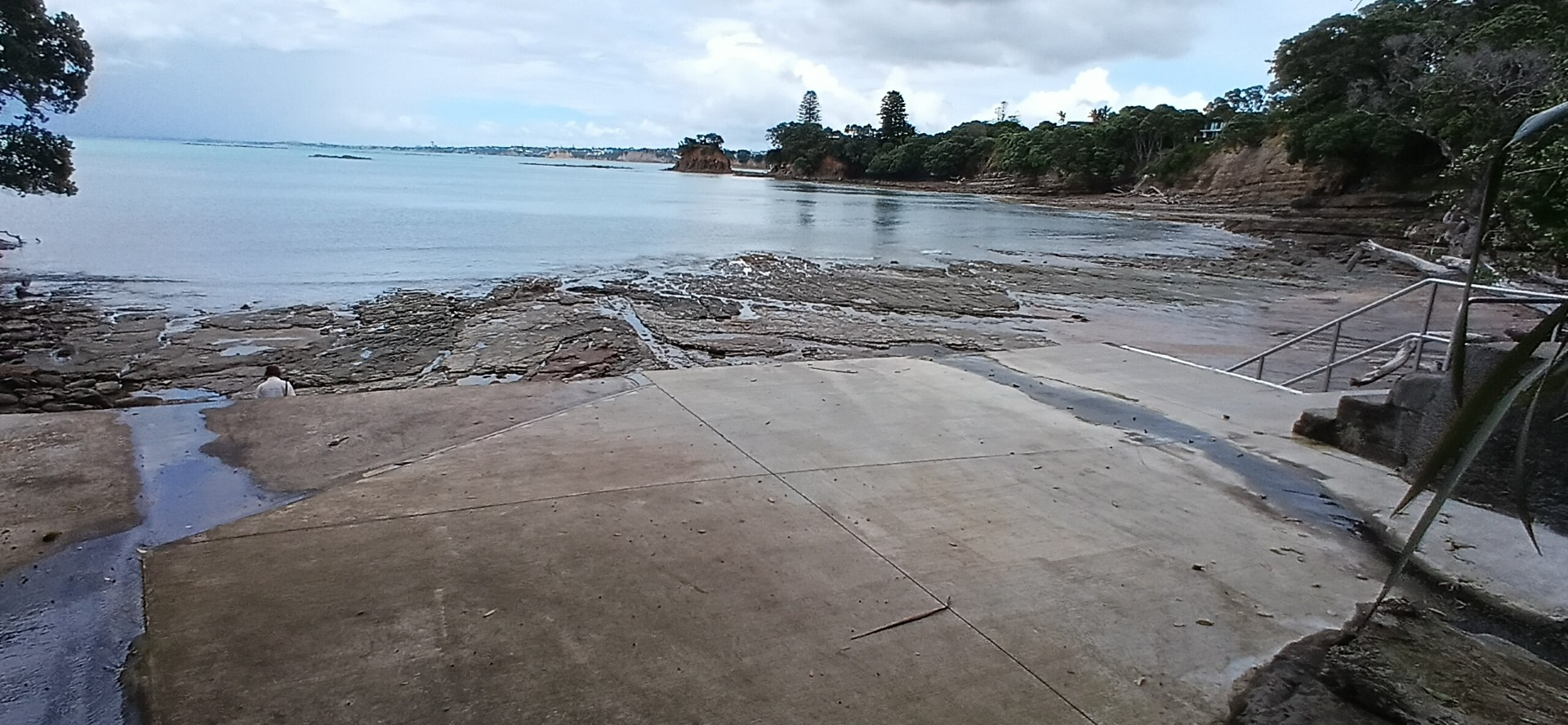
