= The Corelli International Academic School of the Arts =

Former art school in Auckland, New Zealand

Coordinates: 36°43′3.83″S 174°44′40.7″E

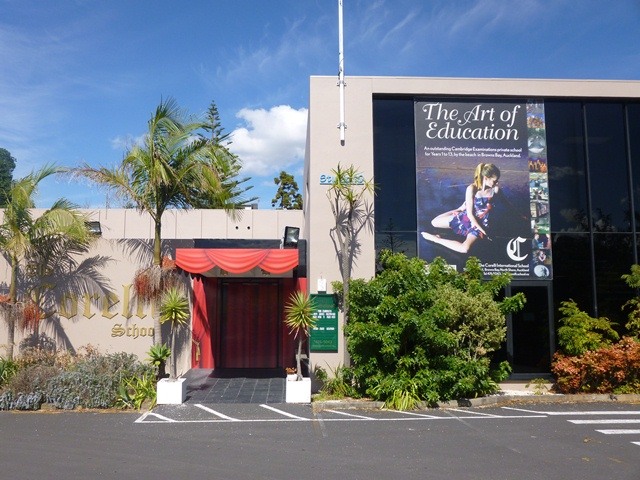

Location
- 50 Anzac Rd, Browns Bay; Auckland

Information
- School type: Private Composite
- Founded: 2001
- Closed: 2016
- Principal: Kirsten Selfe
- Years offered: Year 1 - Year 13
- Website: www.corelli.school.nz

The Corelli International Academic School of the Arts was an independent co-educational art-focused school in Browns Bay, Auckland, New Zealand, founded in 2001. The school was a member of the Independent Schools of New Zealand (ISNZ). It went into receivership in 2016.
