= Browns Bay, New Zealand =

Browns Bay
- Suburb
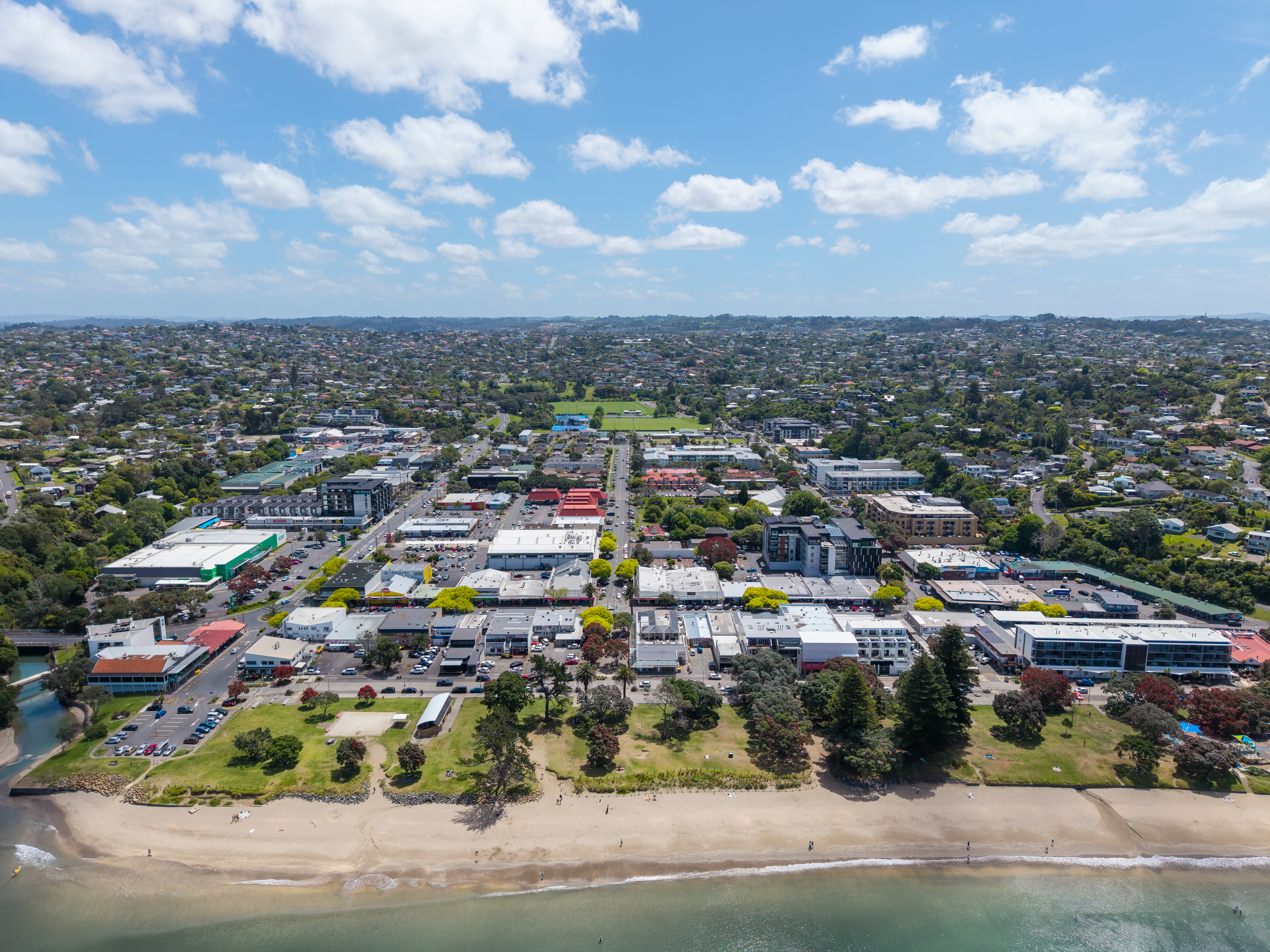
- Aerial shot of Browns Bay from the east
- Interactive map of Browns Bay
- Coordinates: 36.716°S 174.742°E
- Country: New Zealand
- City: Auckland
- Local authority: Auckland Council
- Electoral ward: Albany ward
- Local board: Hibiscus and Bays

Area
  - Land: 319 ha (790 acres)

Population (June 2025)
  - Total: 10,930
  - Density: 3,430/km^{2} (8,870/sq mi)

Torbay Heights	Waiake	(Hauraki Gulf)
Northcross	Browns Bay	(Hauraki Gulf)
Murrays Bay	Rothesay Bay	(Hauraki Gulf)

Browns Bay is one of the northernmost suburbs in the contiguous Auckland metropolitan area, located in the North Shore. Named after the Brown family who settled here in 1876, Browns Bay became a holiday destination in the late 19th century. The area gradually developed into a suburb of Auckland in the 1950s, and was the administrative centre for the East Coast Bays City from 1975 until it was disestablished in 1989. During the 1990s, the suburb became a hub for the South African New Zealander community.

== Geography ==
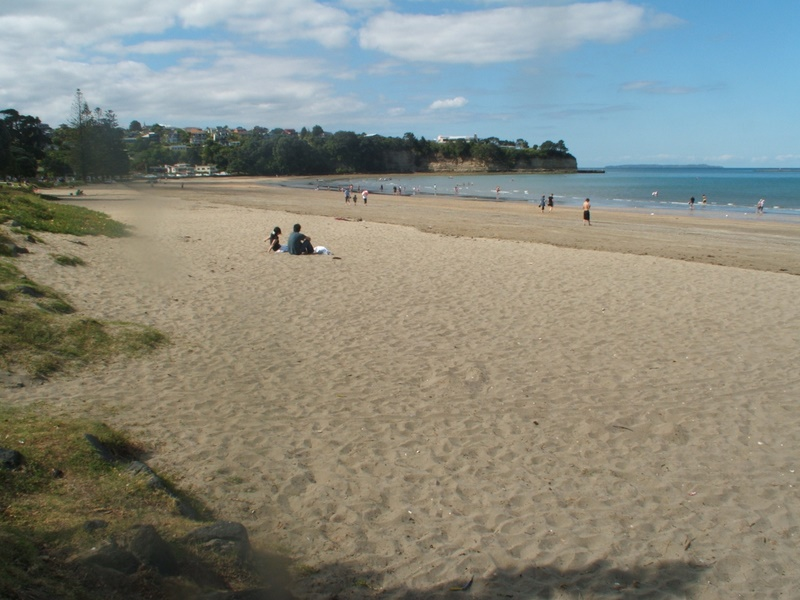
Browns Bay beach

Browns Bay is located in the East Coast Bays of the North Shore, between Waiake and Rothesay Bay. The bay looks out to the Hauraki Gulf islands of Rangitoto, Motutapu Island and Rakino Island. A small stream, the Taiaotea Creek, flows east through the suburb towards the Hauraki Gulf. The soil in Browns Bay is primarily formed from clay and Waitemata sandstone, which can be seen in the cliffs along the coast.

Prior to human settlement, the inland Browns Bay area was primarily a northern broadleaf podocarp forest, dominated by tōtara, mataī, miro, kauri and kahikatea trees. Pōhutukawa trees were a major feature of the coastline. By the 1870s, the area was primarily scrubland, with significant amounts of mānuka and tutu.

== History ==
=== Māori history ===
Māori settlement of the Auckland Region began around the 13th or 14th centuries. The North Shore was settled by Tāmaki Māori, including people descended from the Tainui migratory canoe and ancestors of figures such as Taikehu and Peretū. Many of the Tāmaki Māori people of the North Shore identified as Ngā Oho. While the poor soils of Browns Bay hindered dense settlement, traditional resources in the area included fish, shellfish and marine birds. While there are few recorded names for the Browns Bay area, one traditional name, Taiaotea ("Clear Environment") is the recorded name for the creek that flows into Browns Bay.

The warrior Maki migrated from the Kāwhia Harbour to his ancestral home in the Auckland Region, likely sometime in the 17th century. Maki conquered and unified many the Tāmaki Māori tribes as Te Kawerau ā Maki, including those of the North Shore. After Maki's death, his sons settled different areas of his lands, creating new hapū. His younger son Maraeariki settled the North Shore and Hibiscus Coast, who based himself at the head of the Ōrewa River. Maraeariki's daughter Kahu succeeded him, and she is the namesake of the North Shore, Te Whenua Roa o Kahu ("The Greater Lands of Kahu"), Many of the iwi of the North Shore, including Ngāti Manuhiri, Ngāti Maraeariki, Ngāti Kahu, Ngāti Poataniwha, Ngāi Tai Ki Tāmaki and Ngāti Whātua, can trace their lineage to Kahu.

By the 18th century, the Marutūāhu iwi Ngāti Paoa had expanded their influence to include the islands of the Hauraki Gulf and the North Shore. During these events in the latter 18th century, Tipau Point to the east of Browns Bay was the location of Ōmangaia Pā, a defensive pā site associated with the Ngāti Tai Manawaiti chief, Te Hehewa. After periods of conflict, peace had been reached by the 1790s. The earliest contact with Europeans began in the late 18th century, which caused many Tāmaki Māori to die of rewharewha, respiratory diseases. During the early 1820s, most Māori of the North Shore fled for the Waikato or Northland due to the threat of war parties during the Musket Wars. Most people had returned by the late 1820s and 1830s.

=== European settlement ===
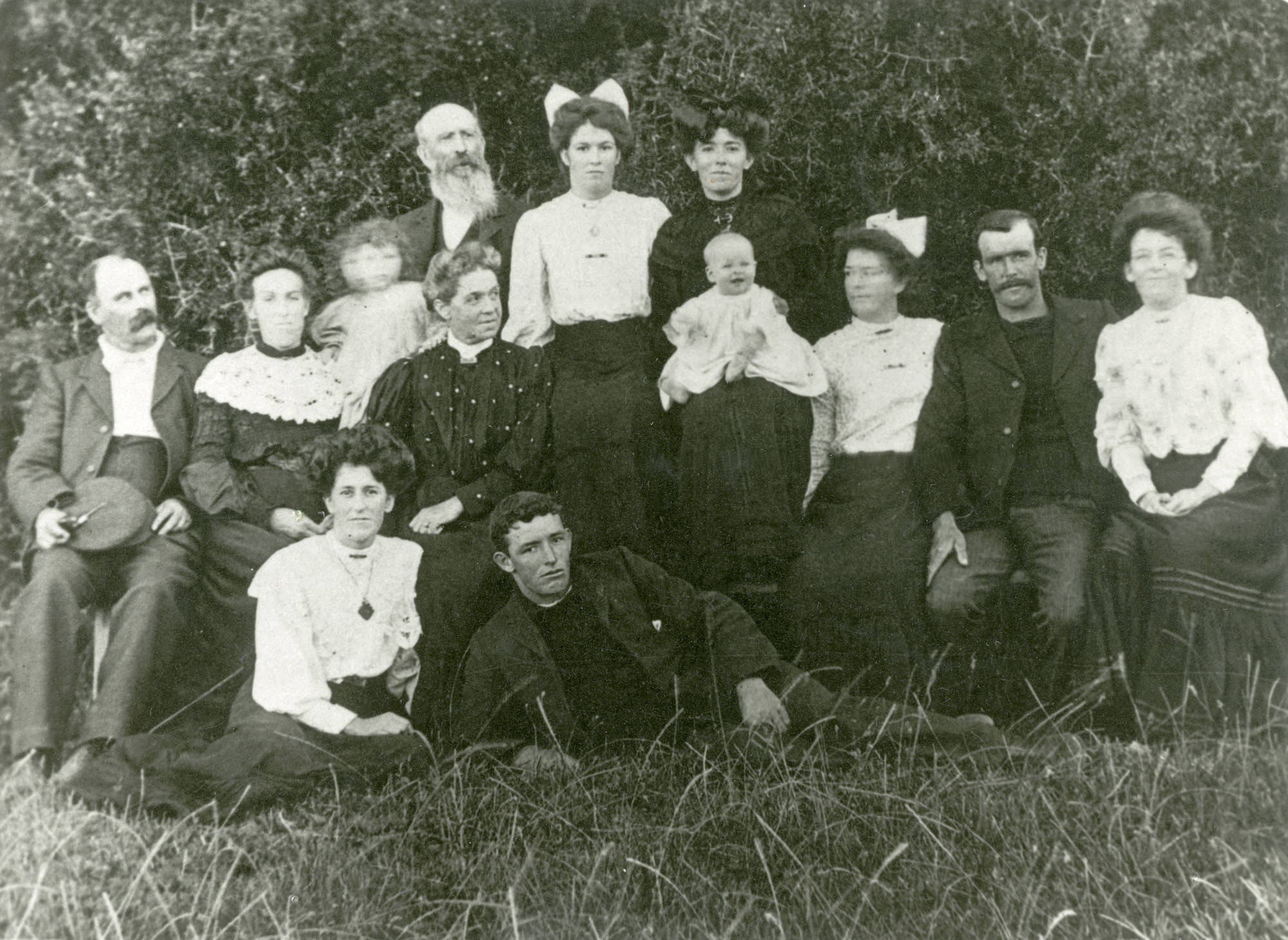
The Brown family celebrating Christmas at Browns Bay in 1905

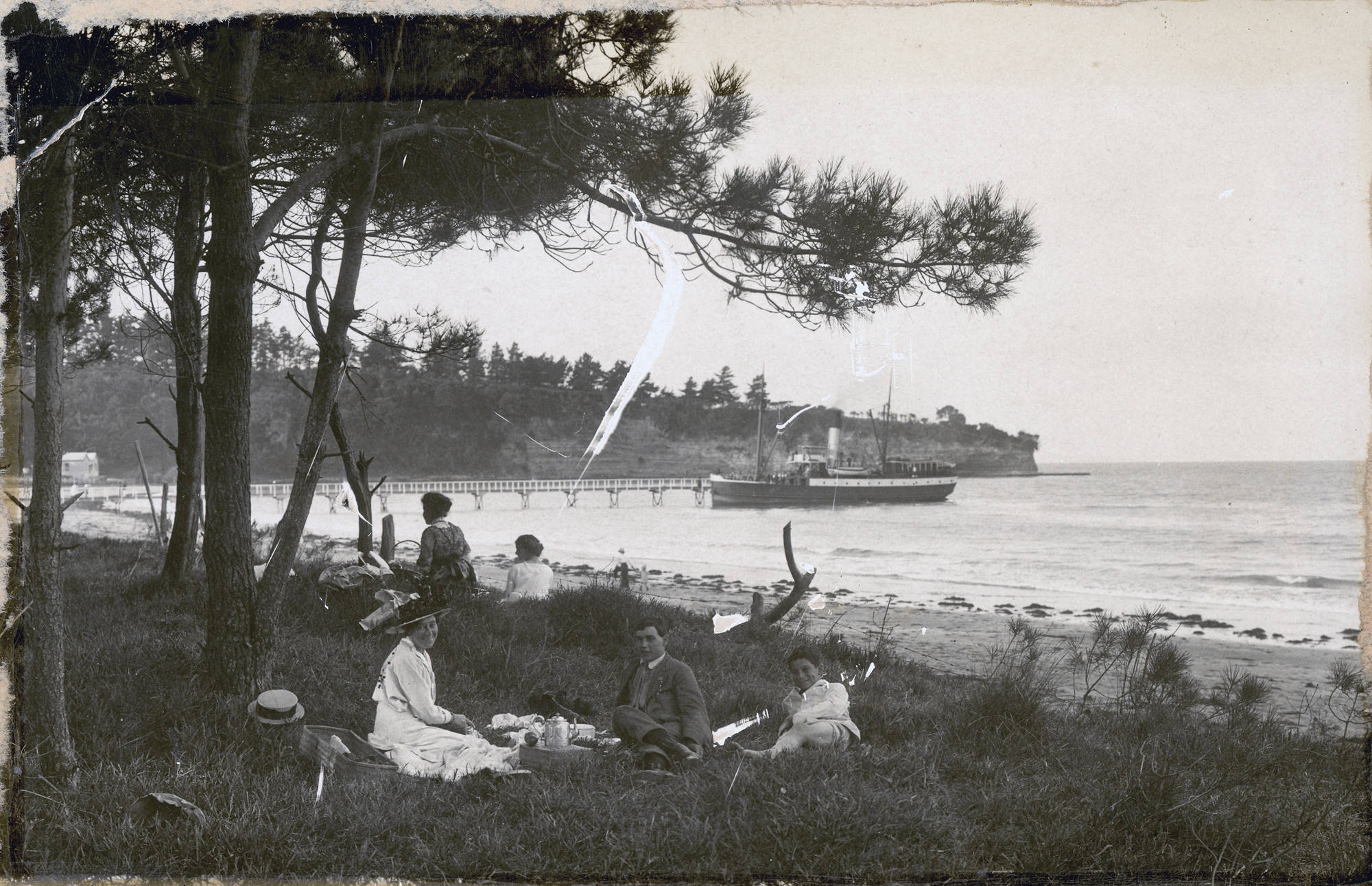
Picnickers at Browns Bay in the 1910s, with the Browns Bay Wharf and the SS Taniwha

In 1841, the Crown purchased the Mahurangi and Omaha blocks; an area that spanned from Takapuna to Te Ārai. The purchase involved some iwi with customary interests in the area, such as Ngāti Paoa, other Marutūāhu iwi and Ngāi Tai ki Tāmaki, but not others, such as Te Kawerau ā Maki or Ngāti Rango. The Crown spent until 1873 rectifying this sale, by making further deals with stakeholders.

The first European land owner in Browns Bay was John Logan Campbell, who purchased Allotment 189 (Ōkura to Browns Bay) in 1864, believing that there was coal in the area. The search for coal was unsuccessful, so Campbell sold the land in the 1870s. During this period, Māori from Whangaparāoa would camp at Browns Bay when travelling south, and developed fenced cultivations around the Glencoe Road hill, growing melons, potatoes and kūmara.

In 1876, Peter Brown purchased an 136 acre property, where he settled with his family, clearing scrubland. The Brown family developed a dairy farm, orchards, a vineyard, an apiary and grew crops including carrots. The suburb was named after Peter Brown, and the Brown family operated a guest house in the 1880s for holiday-makers visiting the beach. The roads to Browns Bay were poorly maintained clay tracks, so most visitors to the area came by stream ferry. While the area became more popular over the summer months, the permanent population remained low. The first school in the area opened in 1888. The area grew in the early 20th century, after the construction of a new wharf, better roads, and the tram from Bayswater to Milford. The Taiotea Boating Club, the first recreational boating club in the East Coast Bays area began operating from Browns Bay circa 1902.

In 1916, the Brown family subdivided their farm, and by 1919 holiday homes had started to be constructed. A post office opened in 1919, using the name Taiaotea, and in 1926 the settlement was officially named Browns Bay. The area grew slowly in the 1920s, primarily due to the difficulty of reaching Browns Bay. Despite this, Browns Bay became the focal point for life for the communities of the East Coast Bays area. In 1925, the 555 Cabaret and Cinema opened on Clyde Road, named after a popular brand of cigarettes. The cabaret club became very popular with boaties and holidaymakers, and for a while the area became known colloquially as Naughty Bay. The area remained popular with holidaymakers and campers into the 1930s and 1940s.

In 1936, a major storm damaged the wharf, a dam and buildings in Browns Bay, and the wharf was never rebuilt. During the Great Depression of the 1930s, a Government work scheme helped develop the roads to Browns Bay, which helped grow the area after World War II. During the war, machine gun emplacements were constructed along the beach, and wire entanglements were constructed as a defence. Pillboxes were constructed along the Browns Bay Esplanade and at Nigel Road.

=== Suburban development ===
By the late 1950s, Browns Bay transitioned from being a holiday community to a suburb of Auckland, after the construction of the Auckland Harbour Bridge. By 1945, ten shops had opened in Browns Bay, and in 1946 Freyberg Park opened as a venue for local sports groups, and by the 1950s a roller skating rink became a popular attraction to Browns Bay. In the early 1950s, manufacturing businesses began operating in Browns Bay, with as a concrete roof tiling business that used local sand, and the clothing manufacturer Ambler & Co. Also in the 1950s, the area also became a centre for boatbuilding and repair, when John Spencer and Keith Atkinson set up workshops on Bute Road. Spencer pioneered many new techniques for the construction of lightweight boats and yachts.

Browns Bay was the home of the East Coast Bays Borough. In the early 1970s, the East Coast Bays council buildings were constructed, and in 1975 the borough became East Coast Bays City.

In the early 1990s, Browns Bay Mall was opened, and the soap opera Shortland Street began filming in the suburb from 1992. In the early 2000s, the East Coast Bays City Council developed a beachfront esplanade along Browns Bay.

Browns Bay became a hub for the South African New Zealander community in the 1990s, with Afrikaans becoming the second-most spoken language in the suburb by 2003.

== Local government ==
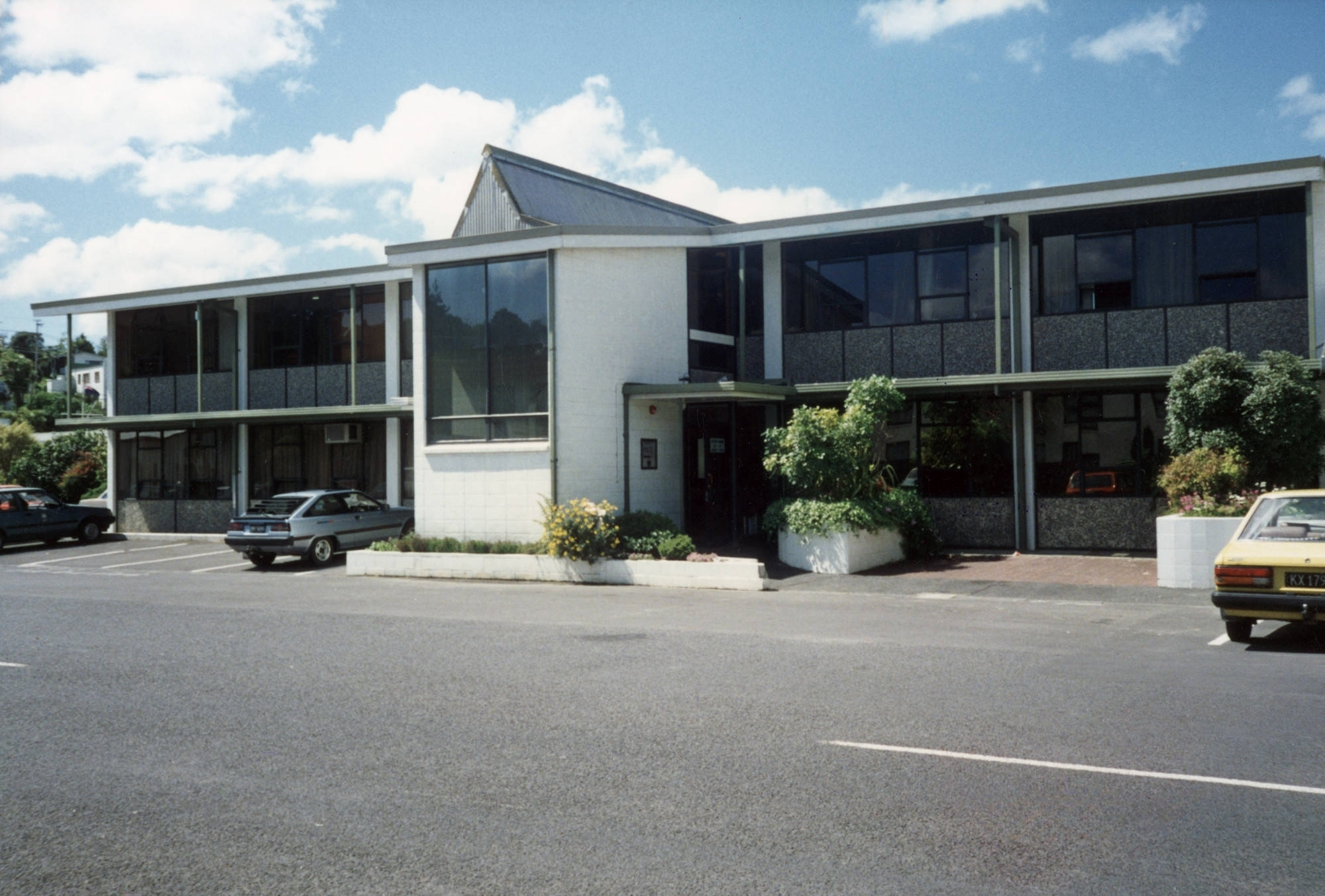
The East Coast Bays City Council buildings in 1989

From 1876 until 1954, the area was administered by the Waitemata County, a large rural county north and west of the city of Auckland. In 1954, the area split from the county, forming the East Coast Bays Borough Council, which became East Coast Bays City in 1975. Browns Bay was the administrative centre of the East Coast Bays Borough and later city. In 1989, the city was merged into the North Shore City. North Shore City was amalgamated into Auckland Council in November 2010.

Within the Auckland Council, Browns Bay is a part of the Hibiscus and Bays local government area governed by the Hibiscus and Bays Local Board. It is a part of the Albany ward, which elects two councillors to the Auckland Council.

== Amenities ==
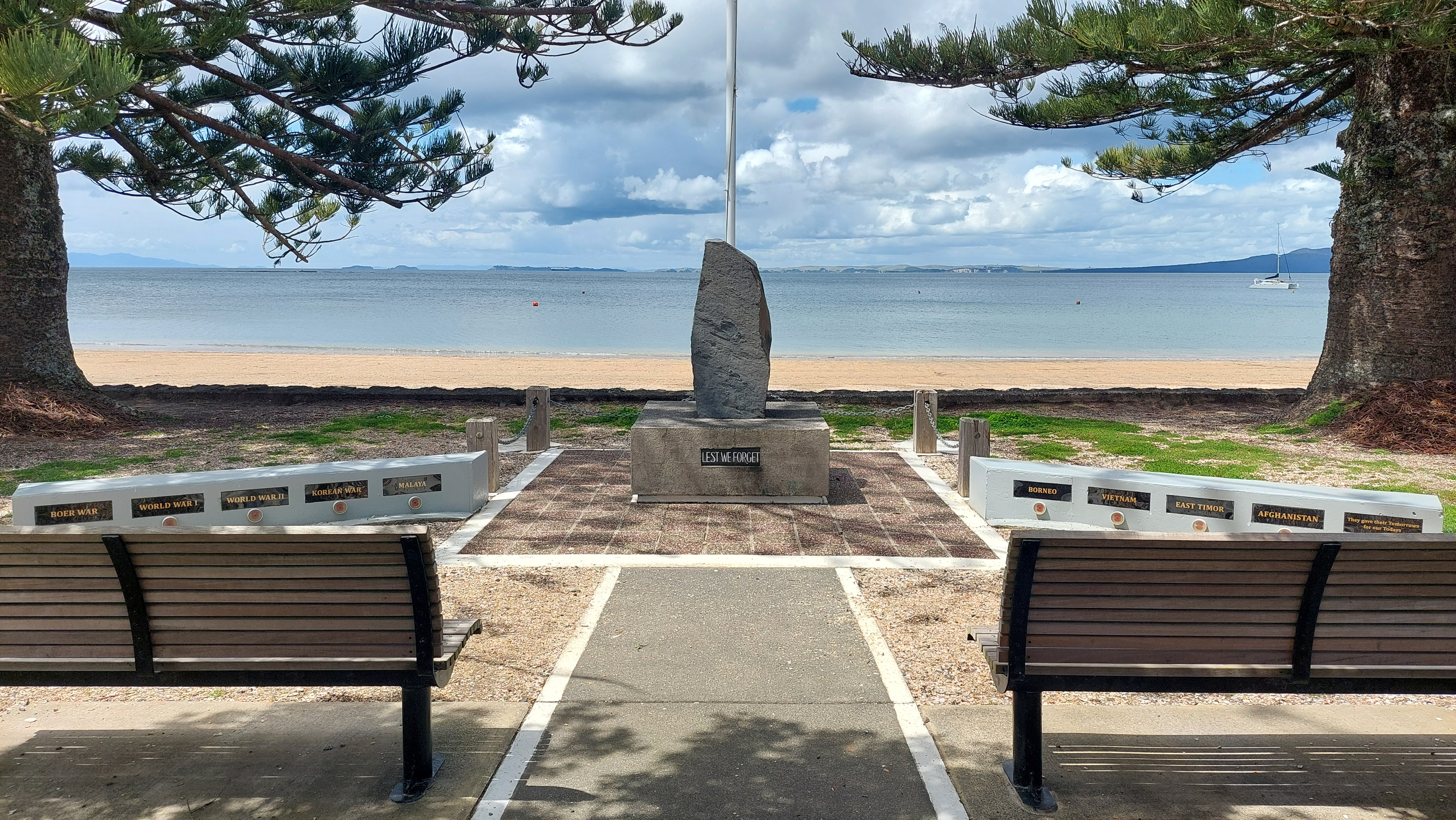
The Stone of Remembrance in 2024

- Freyberg Park was opened in 1946 as a mixed use sporting ground. It was named after Victoria Cross recipient and then-Governor-General, Bernard Freyberg.
- The Browns Bay Beach Reserve is an area of parkland adjacent to the beach. The reserve has the only skatepark in the East Coast Bays, and a popular walkway runs through the reserve, connecting Browns Bay to Campbells Bay in the south.
- The Stone of Remembrance is an ANZAC memorial located on the Browns Bay waterfront, which was unveiled in 1968.
- Sherwood Reserve, a wetland reserve and park developed in the 1970s. The park is known for its Robin Hood-themed playground.
- The Village Green, a central park in Browns Bay that was developed in the 1970s.

== Sport and recreation ==
- The East Coast Bays Barracudas rugby league club is based in Browns Bay.
- The Browns Bay Bowling Club began operating in the suburb in 1943.

== Demographics ==
Browns Bay covers 3.19 km^{2} (1.23 sq mi) and had an estimated population of 10,930 as of June 2025, with a population density of 3,426 people per km^{2}.

Historical population
Year	Pop.	±% p.a.
2006	8,790	—
2013	9,426	+1.00%
2018	9,996	+1.18%
2023	10,311	+0.62%

Browns Bay had a population of 10,311 in the 2023 New Zealand census, an increase of 315 people (3.2%) since the 2018 census, and an increase of 885 people (9.4%) since the 2013 census. There were 5,022 males, 5,238 females and 51 people of other genders in 3,573 dwellings. 3.3% of people identified as LGBTIQ+. The median age was 39.8 years (compared with 38.1 years nationally). There were 1,803 people (17.5%) aged under 15 years, 1,896 (18.4%) aged 15 to 29, 4,953 (48.0%) aged 30 to 64, and 1,662 (16.1%) aged 65 or older.

People could identify as more than one ethnicity. The results were 61.6% European (Pākehā); 5.3% Māori; 2.2% Pasifika; 33.8% Asian; 3.3% Middle Eastern, Latin American and African New Zealanders (MELAA); and 2.6% other, which includes people giving their ethnicity as "New Zealander". English was spoken by 92.0%, Māori language by 0.8%, Samoan by 0.3%, and other languages by 37.5%. No language could be spoken by 1.7% (e.g. too young to talk). New Zealand Sign Language was known by 0.3%. The percentage of people born overseas was 56.2, compared with 28.8% nationally.

Religious affiliations were 32.5% Christian, 0.9% Hindu, 1.0% Islam, 0.3% Māori religious beliefs, 1.5% Buddhist, 0.4% New Age, 0.1% Jewish, and 1.2% other religions. People who answered that they had no religion were 55.9%, and 6.2% of people did not answer the census question.

Of those at least 15 years old, 2,427 (28.5%) people had a bachelor's or higher degree, 3,552 (41.7%) had a post-high school certificate or diploma, and 1,875 (22.0%) people exclusively held high school qualifications. The median income was $45,300, compared with $41,500 nationally. 1,410 people (16.6%) earned over $100,000 compared to 12.1% nationally. The employment status of those at least 15 was that 4,497 (52.9%) people were employed full-time, 1,113 (13.1%) were part-time, and 225 (2.6%) were unemployed.

Individual statistical areas
Name	Area (km^{2})	Population	Density (per km^{2})	Dwellings	Median age	Median income
Browns Bay Central	1.18	3,213	2,723	1,272	42.5 years	$44,900
Browns Bay South West	1.15	4,143	3,603	1,344	38.4 years	$45,600
Browns Bay South East	0.86	2,955	3,436	960	39.0 years	$45,100
New Zealand					38.1 years	$41,500

== Education ==
Browns Bay School is a contributing primary (years 1–6) school with a roll of 616 students as of July 2026. The school was established in 1888.

Harbour College was a Montessori school (years 7–10) in Browns Bay. It closed at the end of 2024.

The Corelli International Academic School of the Arts was a private composite (years 1–13) school which ran specialist programs in visual arts, music, drama and dance as well as the general curriculum. It opened in 2001, and went into receivership in 2016.

== Notable residents ==
- Ryk Hattingh, South African playwright, author and journalist
- Michael King, New Zealand historian
- Jelal Kalyanji Natali, Indian-New Zealand shopkeeper, Indian community leader and anti-racism activist.
- John Spencer, New Zealand boat designer.

== Bibliography ==
- Cass, David (1989). ECB – the Years to 1989. East Coast Bays City Council.
- Sheehan, Vanessa (2019). An Almost Complete History of the East Coast Bays.
- Stone, R. C. J. (2001). From Tamaki-makau-rau to Auckland. Auckland University Press. ISBN 1869402596.
- Willis, Jenny (2018). Early History of East Coast Bays (Second ed.).
- Verran, David (2010), The North Shore: An Illustrated History, North Shore: Random House, OL 33434370W, Wikidata Q120520385
