= Northcross Intermediate =

Northcross Intermediate School

Location
- 10 Sartors Avenue; Northcross, 0630; New Zealand; 36.7153°S 174.7272°E

Information
- Other names: Northcross
- Type: State and day intermediate school
- Motto: "Individual Growth through Challenge and Learning"
- Founded: 1 February 1970
- Authority: State government
- Ministry of Education Institution no.: 1396
- Administrator: Donne Greentree
- Director: Murray Toohill (ICT), Shannon Hale (Sports), Sharon Hines (International Students)
- Principal: Jonathan Tredray
- Years: 7-8
- Gender: Co-educational
- Enrolment: 1,510 (July 2026)
- Socio-economic decile: 10Z
- Website: www.northcross.school.nz

Northcross Intermediate is a state coeducational intermediate school located in the Northcross suburb in the North Shore of Auckland, New Zealand. Years 7 to 8 are the year group (ages ranging from 10 to 13). The school has 1,510 students as of July 2026,. Jonathon Tredray is currently the school principal. The school focuses on "providing a dynamic and student centered learning environment in these very important years of an adolescent’s growth and development." They have a wide range of extra curricular activities, mainly focused in sports and other activities.

== History ==
Northcross Intermediate School was first opened on 1 February 1970. The school is located in the suburb of Northcross, in the North Shore of Auckland, New Zealand. Sherwood School, the neighboring primary school (years 1 – 6) directly next to Northcross Intermediate, opened in 1976, 6 years after Northcross Intermediate opened. Both Northcross and Sherwood Primary share the same field.

== Enrolment ==
On the October 2015 Education Review Office (ERO) review of the school, Northcross Intermediate had 1351 students. The rolls gender composition consisted of 53% male and 47% female, and the ethnic composition was 53% New Zealand European (Pākehā), 24% Other European, 13% Asian, 8% Māori, 1% Pacific Islander and 1% Other.

Northcross Intermediate has a socio-economic decile of 10Z, meaning that it gets students from higher socio-economic areas compared to other New Zealand schools, such as areas like in the East Coast Bays, and other high socio-economic areas.
