= Northcross =

- Suburb
- Interactive map of Northcross
- Coordinates: 36.709°S 174.728°E
- Country: New Zealand
- City: Auckland
- Local authority: Auckland Council
- Electoral ward: Albany ward
- Local board: Hibiscus and Bays

Area
  - Land: 107 ha (260 acres)

Population (June 2025)
  - Total: 3,470
  - Density: 3,240/km^{2} (8,400/sq mi)
- Postcode: 0630

| Glenvar | Torbay Heights | Torbay |
| Albany Heights | Northcross | Browns Bay |
| Oteha | Pinehill | Rothesay Bay |

Northcross is a northern suburb of the North Shore in the contiguous Auckland metropolitan area in New Zealand. It is located in the East Coast Bays, a string of small suburbs that make up the northern North Shore. It is located north of the Waitematā Harbour and is currently under local governance of Auckland Council.

The suburb houses East Coast Bays who are current Champions of the 2010 Lotto Sport Italia NRFL Premier.

== Demographics ==
Northcross covers 1.07 km^{2} (0.41 sq mi) and had an estimated population of 3,470 as of June 2025, with a population density of 3,243 people per km^{2}.

Historical population
| Year | Pop. | ±% p.a. |
|---|---|---|
| 2006 | 3,132 | — |
| 2013 | 3,219 | +0.39% |
| 2018 | 3,276 | +0.35% |
| 2023 | 3,258 | −0.11% |

Northcross had a population of 3,258 in the 2023 New Zealand census, a decrease of 18 people (−0.5%) since the 2018 census, and an increase of 39 people (1.2%) since the 2013 census. There were 1,590 males, 1,653 females and 15 people of other genders in 1,101 dwellings. 3.3% of people identified as LGBTIQ+. The median age was 38.4 years (compared with 38.1 years nationally). There were 573 people (17.6%) aged under 15 years, 630 (19.3%) aged 15 to 29, 1,608 (49.4%) aged 30 to 64, and 447 (13.7%) aged 65 or older.

People could identify as more than one ethnicity. The results were 62.2% European (Pākehā); 4.8% Māori; 2.0% Pasifika; 32.6% Asian; 3.0% Middle Eastern, Latin American and African New Zealanders (MELAA); and 3.9% other, which includes people giving their ethnicity as "New Zealander". English was spoken by 91.9%, Māori language by 0.6%, Samoan by 0.5%, and other languages by 36.5%. No language could be spoken by 2.0% (e.g. too young to talk). New Zealand Sign Language was known by 0.5%. The percentage of people born overseas was 54.6, compared with 28.8% nationally.

Religious affiliations were 30.9% Christian, 0.7% Hindu, 1.3% Islam, 0.1% Māori religious beliefs, 1.5% Buddhist, 0.2% New Age, 0.4% Jewish, and 1.1% other religions. People who answered that they had no religion were 57.8%, and 6.2% of people did not answer the census question.

Of those at least 15 years old, 717 (26.7%) people had a bachelor's or higher degree, 1,155 (43.0%) had a post-high school certificate or diploma, and 615 (22.9%) people exclusively held high school qualifications. The median income was $48,500, compared with $41,500 nationally. 411 people (15.3%) earned over $100,000 compared to 12.1% nationally. The employment status of those at least 15 was that 1,500 (55.9%) people were employed full-time, 372 (13.9%) were part-time, and 63 (2.3%) were unemployed.

== Association football ==
Northcross is home to East Coast Bays who compete in the Lotto Sport Italia NRFL Premier.

== Education ==
Northcross Intermediate is an intermediate (years 7–8) school with a roll of 1459 students as of July 2025. Sherwood School is a contributing primary (years 1–6) school with a 465 students as of July 2025. Sherwood celebrated its 25th anniversary in 2001.

Both schools are coeducational. The two sites are separated by playing fields. After school care for children at Northcross is provided at Sherwood.
