= Ōrewa River =

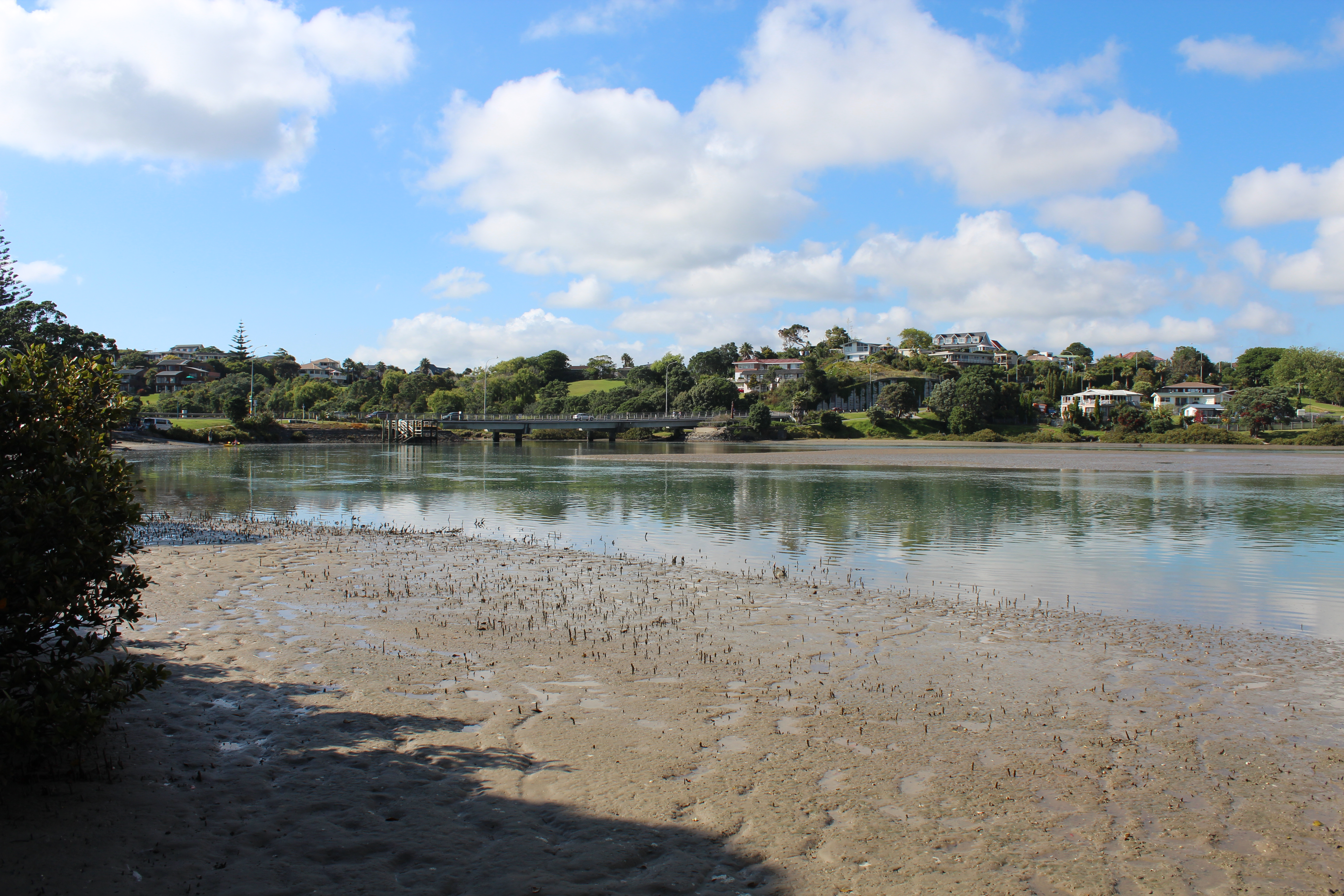
- The Ōrewa River estuary

- Mouth of the Ōrewa River Ōrewa River (New Zealand)
- Route of the Ōrewa River

Location
- Country: New Zealand
- Region: Auckland Region

Physical characteristics
- Source
  - location: Wainui
  - coordinates: 36.6027°S 174.6106°E
- Mouth: Whangaparāoa Bay
  - coordinates: 36.5984°S 174.7018°E
- Length: 10 km (6 mi)

Basin features
- Progression: Ōrewa River → Whangaparāoa Bay → Hauraki Gulf
- Tributaries
  - right: Waterloo Creek

The Ōrewa River is a river of the Auckland Region of New Zealand's North Island. It flows east to reach Whangaparāoa Bay just to the north of Whangaparāoa Peninsula. The town of Orewa is near the river's mouth.

== Geography ==
The Ōrewa River begins as a freshwater river flowing east through the Hibiscus Coast area. As it reaches the Hauraki Gulf, the river forms a shallow estuary. The river has one major tributary, the Waterloo Creek, and has an island in the river estuary, Te Motu-o-Marae-Ariki, also known as Crocodile Island.

== History ==
The Aotoetoe Portage allowed waka to cross between the Kaipara Harbour in the west to the Hauraki Gulf, via the Kaukapakapa River. A similar portage linked between the Kaukapakapa River and the Weiti River to the south.

== Amenities ==
Te Ara Tahuna Estuary Walk is a circular walk around the Ōrewa River estuary.

== See also ==
- List of rivers of New Zealand
