= 1980 East Coast Bays by-election =

New Zealand by-election

- 6 September 1980
- Turnout: 18,611 (63.64%)

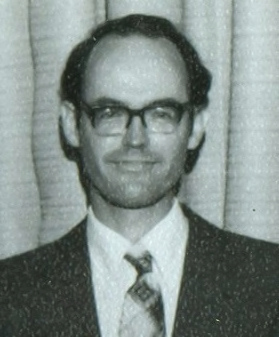

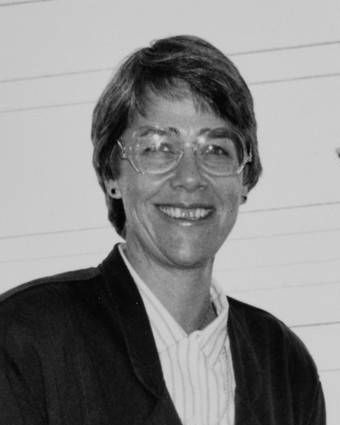
Candidate	Gary Knapp	Don Brash	Wyn Hoadley
Party	Social Credit	National	Labour
Popular vote	8,061	7,110	3,296
Percentage	43.31	38.20	17.71
Member before election
Frank Gill
National
Elected Member
Gary Knapp
Social Credit

The East Coast Bays by-election of 1980 was a by-election during the 39th New Zealand Parliament in the East Coast Bays electorate. It resulted in an upset for the National Party, as their candidate and future leader Don Brash was unexpectedly beaten by Gary Knapp of the Social Credit Party.

== Background ==
The Prime Minister, Robert Muldoon, appointed Frank Gill, National Party MP for East Coast Bays since the 1972 election, to take up a position as New Zealand's ambassador to the United States. Muldoon did so against the express wish of Brian Talboys, who was Minister of Foreign Affairs.

== Candidates ==
Labour

The Labour Party selected Wyn Hoadley over three others to stand in the election. Hoadley, a barrister and adult education lecturer at University of Auckland, was Labour's candidate for North Shore in 1975.

National

As a safe seat there was much interest from the National Party membership. 12 candidates came forward for the National nomination. They included:

- John Banks, National's candidate for Roskill in 1978
- Don Brash, member of the New Zealand Planning Council and general manager of the Broadbank Corporation
- Alan McCulloch, the Mayor of East Coast Bays
- Lesley Miller, National's candidate for Taupo in 1978 and press secretary for Muldoon
- Barry O'Connor, National's candidate for New Lynn in 1975
- Armyne Raines, deputy chairperson of the East Coast Bays National Party
- Bill Raines, secretary of the East Coat Bays National Party
- Bill Rayner, chief accountant for Columbus Maritime Services
- Richard Walls, former MP for Dunedin North
- Sue Wood, National's vice-president and candidate in the recent Onehunga by-election

Secretary of the Auckland National Party John Tremewan said the 12 candidates would be narrowed to 5. Prior to the selection meeting three candidates were identified as the most likely to win; Brash, Rayner and Wood. Based on her performance as National's candidate three months earlier at the Onehunga by-election party president George Chapman stated Wood "should be in Parliament and as soon as possible" by being a candidate in a safe seat. As there was already speculation at the time about Gill's retirement, media commented that Chapman was hinting as East Coast Bays. Brash, Miller, Rayner, Walls and Wood were the shortlisted candidates. This was later further shortened to four after Walls was hospitalised and was too ill to travel to Auckland for the selection meeting.

Brash won selection on the first ballot. It was not only a surprise for him to win, especially on the first ballot, but also to media as he had only joined the National Party six months earlier and was publicly critical of Muldoon's last budget.

Social Credit

The Social Credit Party selected Gary Knapp as its candidate. Knapp had contested the seat in 1978 where he had boosted Social Credit's vote from 5% to 20%, one of the party's best results at the election.

Others

The National Alternative group, who ran a candidate against Gill and several other National MPs in 1978, did not contest the election. Jim Bridges, a spokesman for the group, stated the group's opposition was to Gill and not the National Party as a whole.

== Campaign ==
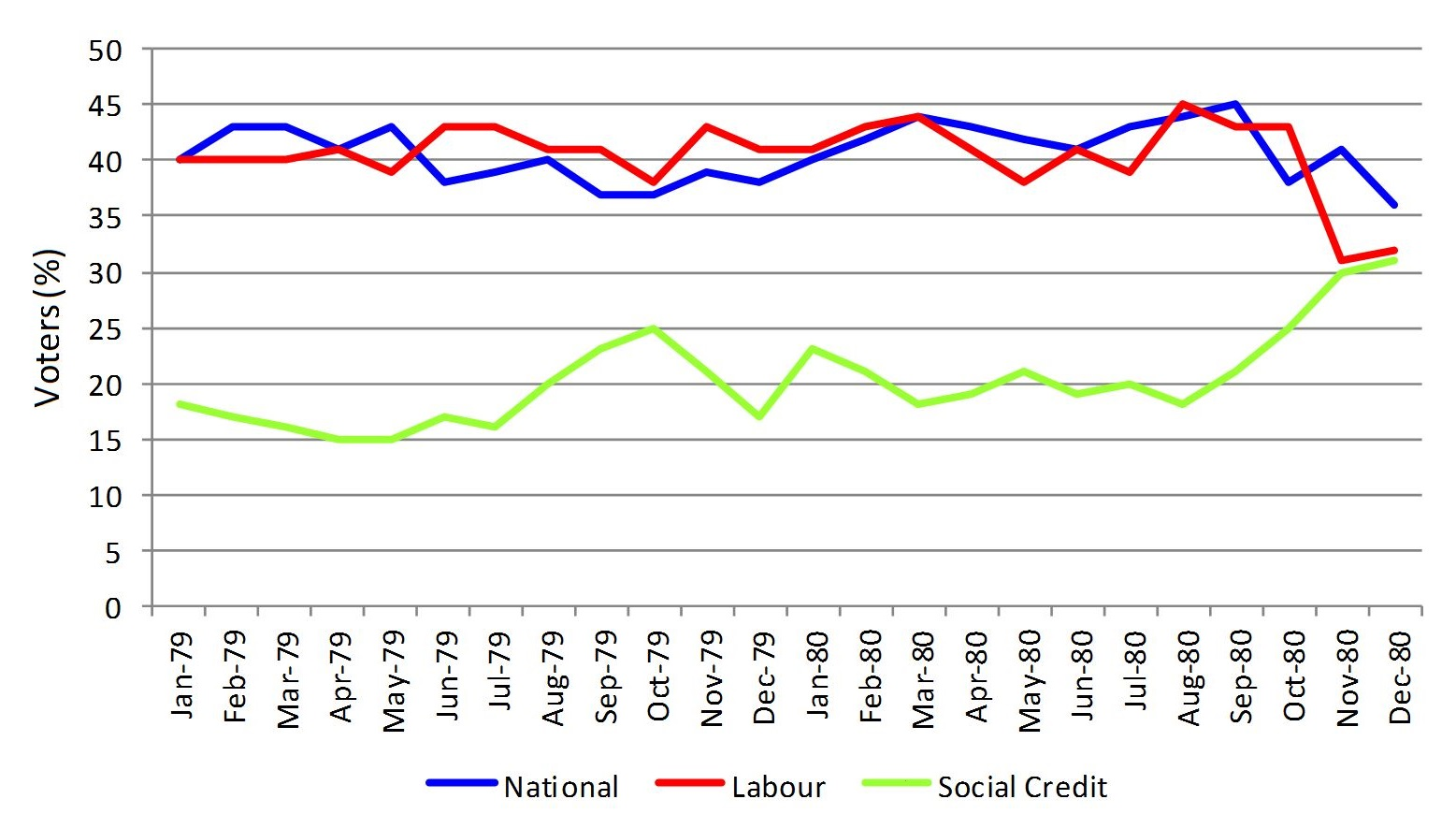
Social Credit's popularity reached its zenith around the time of the East Coast Bays by-election.

Shortly before the election, Muldoon raised the tolls on the Auckland Harbour Bridge from 20 cents to 25 cents, which was a very unpopular move. The Labour Party had ongoing problems with their billboards being vandalised. Labour attempted to discredit Social Credit with a pamphlet that set out the movement's founder, Major C. H. Douglas, antisemitic views. Muldoon was also embroiled in a public spat with various journalists, most notably cartoonist Tom Scott. But most damaging was Muldoon's lack of enthusiasm for National's candidate for the by-election, Don Brash; Muldoon had favoured the party's vice-president Sue Wood. Tactical voting by Labour supporters was partly responsible for the upset. Many also believed that Muldoon, who had no time for his economist candidate, put up the tolls on the harbour bridge just before the contest with the intention of derailing Brash's campaign. Chief among Muldoon's gripes with Brash was that he had recently hosted the New Zealand visit of arch-monetarist Milton Friedman whose economic ideas were contrary to Muldoon's policies.

== Results ==
Voting resulted in the election of Knapp, the candidate of the Social Credit Party. That was unexpected, as minor parties rarely won seats in Parliament at the time, but such voting was more likely in a by-election. Muldoon blamed Brash and the party organisation for the defeat but was strongly rebuked by the party for the stance. The loss of the by-election provided the catalyst for growing opposition within the National Party to Muldoon's leadership.

The following table gives the election results:

1980 East Coast Bays by-election
Party	Candidate	Votes	%	±%
Social Credit	Gary Knapp	8,061	43.31	+23.33
National	Don Brash	7,110	38.20	
Labour	Wyn Hoadley	3,296	17.71	
Values	Janet Moore	144	0.77	
Majority		951	5.11	
Turnout		18,611	63.64	−12.95
Registered electors		29,243		
Social Credit gain from National		Swing		

Knapp held the electorate until the 1987 general election, when he was defeated by National's Murray McCully.
