= East Coast Bays (electorate) =

New Zealand parliamentary electorate represented by Erica Stanford

- Single-member general constituency for the New Zealand House of Representatives
- Interactive map of boundaries from the 2026 election
- Formation: 1972, 2002
- Region: Auckland
- Character: Suburban
- Term: 3 years

Member for East Coast Bays
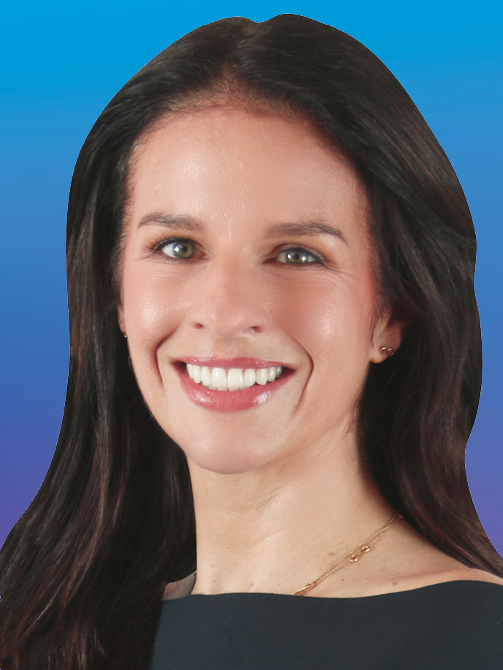
- Erica Stanford since 23 September 2017
- Party: National
- Previous MP: Murray McCully (National)
Party vote distribution

East Coast Bays is a New Zealand parliamentary electorate. It was first formed in 1972 and has existed apart from a break lasting two parliamentary terms. The electorate has been held by Erica Stanford of the National Party since the 2017 general election.

== Population centres ==
Map of boundaries at the 2020 and 2023 general elections

Since the 1969 election, the number of electorates in the South Island was fixed at 25, with continued faster population growth in the North Island leading to an increase in the number of general electorates. There were 84 electorates for the 1969 election, and the 1972 electoral redistribution saw three additional general seats created for the North Island, bringing the total number of electorates to 87. Together with increased urbanisation in Christchurch and Nelson, the changes proved very disruptive to existing electorates. In the South Island, three electorates were abolished, and three electorates were newly created. In the North Island, five electorates were abolished, two electorates were recreated, and six electorates were newly created (including East Coast Bays).

The electorate is based around the north-eastern suburbs of North Shore City in north Auckland with the Okura River making part of the northern boundary. The electorate includes the communities of Ōkura, Long Bay, Torbay, Waiake, Northcross, Browns Bay, Fairview Heights, Pinehill, Oteha, Albany, Rothesay Bay and Murrays Bay. The electorate crosses State Highway One at its southern end, which includes a section of Glenfield. In the 2025 boundary review, the electorate lost the population centres directly north of the Upper Harbour Motorway including Schnapper Rock, Rosedale and Windsor Park, while gaining the communities north of Lucas Creek including Lucas Heights and Pāremoremo from Whangaparāoa.

== History ==
East Coast Bays was an electorate in the New Zealand Parliament between 1972 and 1996, before being abolished to make way for the Albany electorate at the change to Mixed Member Proportional (MMP) voting. High population growth in North Auckland lead to the electorate's western fringe being removed in 2002, and with it the eponymous suburb of Albany, thus recreating East Coast Bays ahead of the 2002 election.

Although now a safe electorate for National, it was held for seven years by Social Credit MP Gary Knapp, from the 1980 by-election when he defeated future National party leader Don Brash. In the 1981, 1984 and 1987 general elections, Labour came third, with Knapp defeating Brash in 1981 and Murray McCully in 1984.

But in 1987 the declining fortunes of the Democratic Party (as Social Credit renamed itself), led to Knapp being defeated by Murray McCully, who held the electorate for National until 2017.

In December 2016, McCully announced that he would not stand for parliament in the 2017 general election, and the seat of East Coast Bays was won by Erica Stanford, retaining it for the National Party.

=== Members of Parliament ===
Key

National Social Credit Democrats United Future Green

Election	Winner
1972 election	Frank Gill^{1}
1975 election	Frank Gill^{1}
1978 election	Frank Gill^{1}
1980 by-election	Gary Knapp
1981 election	Gary Knapp
1984 election	Gary Knapp
1987 election	Murray McCully
1990 election	Murray McCully
1993 election	Murray McCully
electorate abolished, see Albany
2002 election	Murray McCully
2005 election	Murray McCully
2008 election	Murray McCully
2011 election	Murray McCully
2014 election	Murray McCully
2017 election	Erica Stanford
2020 election	Erica Stanford
2023 election	Erica Stanford

^{1} Resigned when appointed Ambassador to the United States

=== List MPs ===
Members of Parliament elected from party lists in elections where that person also unsuccessfully contested the East Coast Bays electorate. Unless otherwise stated, all MPs terms began and ended at general elections.

Election	Winner
2002 election	Paul Adams
2008 election	Sue Bradford^{2}

^{2}Bradford resigned from Parliament on 30 October 2009.

== Election results ==
=== 2026 election ===
The next election will be held on 7 November 2026. Candidates for East Coast Bays are listed at Candidates in the 2026 New Zealand general election by electorate § East Coast Bays. Official results will be available after 27 November 2026.

=== 2023 election ===
2023 general election: East Coast Bays
Notes:	Blue background denotes the winner of the electorate vote. Pink background denotes a candidate elected from their party list. Yellow background denotes an electorate win by a list member, or other incumbent. A ✓ or ✗ denotes status of any incumbent, win or lose respectively.						
Party	Candidate	Votes	%	±%	Party votes	%	±%
National	✓ Erica Stanford	27,687	71.52	+17.81	22,508	57.59	+19.40
Labour	Naisi Chen	7,334	18.94	−11.77	5,716	14.62	−25.43
ACT	Michael McCook	1,584	4.09	+0.42	3,774	9.65	+0.88
NewZeal	Paul Adams	890	2.29		409	1.04	+0.94
NZ Loyal	Bill Dyet	710	1.83		386	0.98	
Green					3,462	8.85	+2.72
NZ First					1,532	3.92	+2.21
Opportunities					646	1.65	+0.51
Te Pāti Māori					137	0.35	+0.18
Legalise Cannabis					105	0.27	+0.05
Animal Justice					62	0.15	
New Conservative					58	0.14	−1.64
Freedoms NZ					51	0.13	
DemocracyNZ					34	0.08	
Women's Rights					32	0.08	
New Nation					24	0.06	
Leighton Baker Party					7	0.01	
Informal votes		505			136		
Total valid votes		38,710			39,079		
National hold	Majority	20,353	52.57	+29.57			

=== 2020 election ===
2020 general election: East Coast Bays
Notes:	Blue background denotes the winner of the electorate vote. Pink background denotes a candidate elected from their party list. Yellow background denotes an electorate win by a list member, or other incumbent. A ✓ or ✗ denotes status of any incumbent, win or lose respectively.						
Party	Candidate	Votes	%	±%	Party votes	%	±%
National	✓ Erica Stanford	20,466	53.71	−11.82	14,658	38.19	−24.59
Labour	Monina Hernandez	11,702	30.71	+12.14	15,372	40.05	+16.85
Green	Dan Jones	2,370	6.22	−0.43	2,353	6.13	+1.39
ACT	Michael McCook	1,397	3.67	+2.55	3,365	8.77	+7.77
New Conservative	Matthew Webster	927	2.43	—	683	1.78	+1.51
TEA	Susanna Kruger	275	0.72	—	161	0.42	—
Outdoors	Marius Koekemoer	172	0.45	—	32	0.08	+0.04
NZ First					657	1.71	−3.67
Opportunities					436	1.14	−0.78
Advance NZ					237	0.62	—
Legalise Cannabis					83	0.22	+0.05
Māori Party					65	0.17	+0.01
ONE					37	0.10	—
Sustainable NZ					29	0.08	—
Social Credit					13	0.03	+0.01
Vision New Zealand					11	0.03	—
Heartland					3	0.01	—
Informal votes		793			188		
Total valid votes		38,102			38,383		
Turnout		38,539	79.12	+2.45			
National hold	Majority	8,764	23.00	−23.96			

=== 2017 election ===
2017 general election: East Coast Bays
Notes:	Blue background denotes the winner of the electorate vote. Pink background denotes a candidate elected from their party list. Yellow background denotes an electorate win by a list member, or other incumbent. A ✓ or ✗ denotes status of any incumbent, win or lose respectively.						
Party	Candidate	Votes	%	±%	Party votes	%	±%
National	Erica Stanford	22,731	65.53	+3.61	22,006	62.78	−0.60
Labour	Naisi Chen	6,441	18.57	+3.30	8,130	23.20	+11.05
Green	Nicholas Mayne	2,306	6.65	−3.30	1,660	4.74	−3.49
Opportunities	Teresa Moore	1,289	3.72	—	673	1.92	—
NZ First	Ilja Ruppeldt	1,254	3.62	—	1,886	5.38	−0.58
ACT	Stephen Berry	389	1.12	—	347	1.00	−4.96
Conservative					95	0.27	−6.43
Legalise Cannabis					58	0.17	−0.12
Māori Party					55	0.16	+0.12
United Future					34	0.10	−0.11
People's Party					18	0.05	—
Outdoors					14	0.04	—
Democrats					6	0.02	−0.03
Mana Party					5	0.01	—
Ban 1080					5	0.01	−0.13
Internet					4	0.01	—
Informal votes		277			154		
Total valid votes		34,687			35,050		
National hold	Majority	16,290	46.96	+0.30			

=== 2014 election ===
2014 general election: East Coast Bays
Notes:	Blue background denotes the winner of the electorate vote. Pink background denotes a candidate elected from their party list. Yellow background denotes an electorate win by a list member, or other incumbent. A ✓ or ✗ denotes status of any incumbent, win or lose respectively.						
Party	Candidate	Votes	%	±%	Party votes	%	±%
National	✓ Murray McCully	19,951	61.92	−3.06	20,895	63.38	+0.52
Conservative	Colin Craig	4,923	15.27	+10.3	2,210	6.7	+2.96
Labour	Greg Milner-White	3,915	12.15	−7.73	4,005	12.15	−5.05
Green	Teresa Moore	3,206	9.95	+1.23	2,712	8.23	+0.17
Ban 1080	Tricia Cheel	229	0.71	+0.71	47	0.14	+0.14
NZ First					1,964	5.96	+1.02
ACT					580	1.76	+0.18
Internet Mana					222	0.67	+0.67
Māori Party					125	0.38	−0.01
Legalise Cannabis					95	0.29	−0.18
United Future					69	0.21	−0.22
Civilian					64	0.06	+0.06
Democrats					17	0.05	+0.02
Independent Coalition					4	0.01	+0.01
Focus					3	0.01	+0.01
Informal votes		327			73		
Total valid votes		32,557			33,041		
National hold	Majority	15,034	46.65	+1.55			

=== 2011 election ===
2011 general election: East Coast Bays
Notes:	Blue background denotes the winner of the electorate vote. Pink background denotes a candidate elected from their party list. Yellow background denotes an electorate win by a list member, or other incumbent. A ✓ or ✗ denotes status of any incumbent, win or lose respectively.						
Party	Candidate	Votes	%	±%	Party votes	%	±%
National	✓ Murray McCully	21,094	64.98	+6.90	21,079	62.86	+1.45
Labour	Viv Goldsmith	6,453	19.88	+2.07	5,769	17.20	−4.44
Green	Brett Stansfield	2,832	8.72	+2.20	2,704	8.72	+2.20
Conservative	Simonne Dyer	1,614	4.97	+4.97	1,254	3.74	+3.74
ACT	Toby Hutton	467	1.44	−2.15	530	1.58	−4.08
NZ First					1,657	4.94	+2.11
Legalise Cannabis					156	0.47	+0.19
United Future					145	0.43	−0.31
Māori Party					130	0.39	−0.01
Mana					64	0.19	+0.19
Libertarianz					24	0.07	+0.001
Alliance					14	0.04	+0.002
Democrats					9	0.03	−0.01
Informal votes		902			160		
Total valid votes		32,460			33,535		
National hold	Majority	14,641	45.10	+4.82			

Electorate (as at 26 November 2011): 47,305

=== 2008 election ===
2008 general election: East Coast Bays
Notes:	Blue background denotes the winner of the electorate vote. Pink background denotes a candidate elected from their party list. Yellow background denotes an electorate win by a list member, or other incumbent. A ✓ or ✗ denotes status of any incumbent, win or lose respectively.						
Party	Candidate	Votes	%	±%	Party votes	%	±%
National	✓ Murray McCully	20,151	58.09	+11.06	21,681	61.40	+9.13
Labour	Viv Goldsmith	6,177	17.81	−9.31	7,642	21.64	−10.13
Family Party	Paul Adams (Note: Paul Adams contested the 2005 election as an independent: the "±% electoral votes" figure here compares Adams' percentage of electoral votes for the Family Party in 2008 with the 2005 percentage as an independent.)	3,570	10.29	−5.58	505	1.43	
Green	Sue Bradford	2,263	6.52	+3.01	1,439	4.08	+0.59
ACT	Tim Kronfeld	1,246	3.59	+2.12	2,000	5.66	+3.09
NZ First	Dail Jones	730	2.10	−0.47	1,001	2.83	−1.94
No Commercial Airport at Whenuapai	Toby Hutton	283	0.82				
United Future	Ian McInnes	215	0.62	−0.49	263	0.74	−1.65
Libertarianz	Elah Zamora	56	0.16		25	0.07	+0.03
Progressive					214	0.61	−0.30
Bill and Ben					149	0.42	
Māori Party					141	0.40	+0.14
Legalise Cannabis					98	0.28	+0.08
Kiwi					90	0.25	
Alliance					14	0.04	-0.00
Pacific					14	0.04	
Democrats					13	0.04	-0.00
Workers Party					8	0.02	
RONZ					7	0.02	+0.00
RAM					5	0.01	
Informal votes		281			91		
Total valid votes		34,691			35,309		
National hold	Majority	13,974	40.28	+20.38			

=== 2005 election ===
2005 general election: East Coast Bays
Notes:	Blue background denotes the winner of the electorate vote. Pink background denotes a candidate elected from their party list. Yellow background denotes an electorate win by a list member, or other incumbent. A ✓ or ✗ denotes status of any incumbent, win or lose respectively.						
Party	Candidate	Votes	%	±%	Party votes	%	±%
National	✓ Murray McCully	17,213	47.02	+7.93	19,437	52.27	+27.44
Labour	Hamish McCracken	9,927	27.12	−7.03	11,813	31.77	−2.04
Independent	Paul Adams	5,809	15.87				
Green	Jeanette Elley	1,287	3.52	−1.92	1,297	3.49	−8.48
NZ First	Anne Martin	942	2.57		1,775	4.77	−5.20
ACT	Andrew Stone	537	1.47	−4.95	956	2.39	−2.80
United Future	Steven Dromgool	405	1.11	−8.14	890	2.39	−7.23
Progressive	Fiona Beazley	253	0.69	−0.95	338	0.91	−0.36
Māori Party	Rahuia Kapa	119	0.33		95	0.26	
Democrats	Patrick Fahey	73	0.20		14	0.04	
Destiny	John Steemson	39	0.11		370	1.00	
Legalise Cannabis					74	0.20	−0.19
Christian Heritage					44	0.12	−0.93
Direct Democracy					28	0.08	
Alliance					15	0.04	−0.86
Libertarianz					14	0.04	
RONZ					7	0.02	
99 MP					6	0.02	
Family Rights					6	0.02	
One NZ					5	0.01	−0.23
Informal votes		324			100		
Total valid votes		36,604			37,184		
National hold	Majority	7,286	19.90	+14.96			

=== 2002 election ===
2002 general election: East Coast Bays
Notes:	Blue background denotes the winner of the electorate vote. Pink background denotes a candidate elected from their party list. Yellow background denotes an electorate win by a list member, or other incumbent. A ✓ or ✗ denotes status of any incumbent, win or lose respectively.						
Party	Candidate	Votes	%	±%	Party votes	%	±%
National	✓ Murray McCully	12,134	39.09		7,876	24.83	
Labour	Hamish McCracken	10,600	34.15		10,722	33.81	
United Future	Paul Adams	2,872	9.25		3,052	9.62	
ACT	Julie Pepper	1,993	6.42		1,646	5.19	
Green	Jeanette Elley	1,688	5.44		3,796	11.97	
One NZ	Alan McCulloch	528	1.70		75	0.24	
Progressive	Jill Henry	508	1.64		403	1.27	
Christian Heritage	Ian Cummings	399	1.29		334	1.05	
Alliance	Fiona McLaren	316	1.02		287	0.90	
NZ First					3,163	9.97	
ORNZ					227	0.72	
Legalise Cannabis					123	0.39	
NMP					6	0.02	
Mana Māori					4	0.01	
Informal votes		392			75		
Total valid votes		31,038			31,714		
National win new seat	Majority	1,534	4.94				

=== 1993 election ===
1993 general election: East Coast Bays
Party	Candidate	Votes	%	±%
National	Murray McCully	10,209	46.74	−0.83
Alliance	Heather-Ann McConachy	5,693	26.06	
Labour	Gordon Duncan	3,253	14.89	
NZ First	Anne Martin	2,232	10.21	
Christian Heritage	Dennis Knox	347	1.58	
Natural Law	Miranda Adams	107	0.48	
Majority		4,516	20.67	−2.32
Turnout		21,841	86.74	−1.31
Registered electors		25,179		

=== 1990 election ===
1990 general election: East Coast Bays
Party	Candidate	Votes	%	±%
National	Murray McCully	10,791	47.57	+7.12
Democrats	Gary Knapp	5,575	24.58	−14.45
Labour	Vivienne Halligan	3,433	15.13	
Green	Dianne Gatward	2,406	10.60	
NewLabour	John Alfred Watson	430	1.89	
Social Credit	Sonia Lee Stewart	45	0.19	
Majority		5,216	22.99	+21.57
Turnout		22,680	88.05	+1.89
Registered electors		25,758		

=== 1987 election ===
1987 general election: East Coast Bays
Party	Candidate	Votes	%	±%
National	Murray McCully	8,833	40.45	+4.62
Democrats	Gary Knapp	8,522	39.03	−5.71
Labour	Wayne Sellwood	4,411	20.20	
Independent	J C Braithwaite	68	0.31	
Majority		311	1.42	
Turnout		21,834	89.94	−3.46
Registered electors		24,276		

=== 1984 election ===
1984 general election: East Coast Bays
Party	Candidate	Votes	%	±%
Social Credit	Gary Knapp	10,146	44.74	−0.16
National	Murray McCully	8,126	35.83	
Labour	Michael Smythe	2,081	9.17	
NZ Party	David Phillips	2,035	8.97	
Independent	Mark Smits	17	0.07	
Majority		2,020	8.90	+5.96
Turnout		22,675	93.40	+1.26
Registered electors		24,276		

=== 1981 election ===
1981 general election: East Coast Bays
Party	Candidate	Votes	%	±%
Social Credit	Gary Knapp	11,568	44.90	+1.59
National	Don Brash	10,810	41.96	+3.76
Labour	Neville Creighton	3,335	12.94	
Independent	Eric Smith	49	0.19	
Majority		758	2.94	−2.17
Turnout		25,762	92.14	+28.50
Registered electors		27,957		

=== 1980 by-election ===
1980 East Coast Bays by-election
Party	Candidate	Votes	%	±%
Social Credit	Gary Knapp	8,061	43.31	+23.33
National	Don Brash	7,110	38.20	
Labour	Wyn Hoadley	3,296	17.71	
Values	Janet Moore	144	0.77	
Majority		951	5.11	
Turnout		18,611	63.64	−12.95
Registered electors		29,243		
Social Credit gain from National		Swing		

=== 1978 election ===
1978 general election: East Coast Bays
Party	Candidate	Votes	%	±%
National	Frank Gill	7,675	34.48	−20.96
Labour	Colleen Hicks	6,109	27.45	
Social Credit	Gary Knapp	4,448	19.98	
Independent National	David Phillips	3,684	16.55	
Values	Eric Smith	339	1.52	
Majority		1,566	7.03	−17.31
Turnout		22,255	76.59	−8.01
Registered electors		29,055		

=== 1975 election ===
1975 general election: East Coast Bays
Party	Candidate	Votes	%	±%
National	Frank Gill	12,739	55.44	+6.80
Labour	Rex Stanton	7,145	31.09	
Values	John Bartram	1,839	8.00	
Social Credit	Noel Edward Lord	1,253	5.45	
Majority		5,594	24.34	+18.72
Turnout		22,976	84.60	−2.59
Registered electors		27,157		

=== 1972 election ===
1972 general election: East Coast Bays
Party	Candidate	Votes	%	±%
National	Frank Gill	8,460	48.64	
Labour	Brian Pauling	7,481	43.01	
Social Credit	Betty Ross	1,357	7.80	
New Democratic	Kay Edgecumbe	93	0.53	
Majority		979	5.62	
Turnout		17,391	87.19	
Registered electors		19,946		
