= Alan McCulloch (politician) =

New Zealand politician

Alan Morton McCulloch is the former leader of the small One New Zealand political party in New Zealand, and previously served as president of the party. He was mayor of East Coast Bays from 1974 to 1983, and has also served in a number of roles in North Shore, such as president of Grey Power, and stood as a candidate for the office of mayor of North Shore City.

In 1977, McCulloch was awarded the Queen Elizabeth II Silver Jubilee Medal.

He claims that New Zealand is currently heading towards racial separatism, and strongly opposes what he sees as special treatment for New Zealand's Māori ethnic minority.

McCulloch was a speculated candidate for the National Party nomination at the 1980 East Coast Bays by-election. However he did not make the candidate shortlist which was won by economist Don Brash. In the 2002 elections, he was ranked third on the One New Zealand list. He also contested the East Coast Bays electorate, coming sixth with 1.7% of the vote.

After the One New Zealand party disbanded, McCulloch later ran for the Auckland mayoralty in 2010 as an independent.
