= New Zealand School Property Agency =

The New Zealand School Property Agency (NZSPA) is a New Zealand Crown agency that is responsible for planning, building, managing and maintaining school property. It was announced by Education Minister Erica Stanford and Infrastructure Minister Chris Bishop on 18 July 2025 and was launched on the 1st of October 2026. It assumes the functions and responsibilities of the Ministry of Education's School Property Group.

== Mandate and functions ==
The NZSPA's main purpose is to plan, build, maintain and administrate the school property portfolio. Other responsibilities include delivering timely, budgeted property solutions and having a commercially-minded governance board and leadership. The new agency assumes the functions of the current Ministry of Education's School Property Group. The Ministry of Education will remain responsible for managing education policy, networking and school rolls.

== History ==
The Ministry of Education's School Property Group is responsible for managing New Zealand's public school property portfolio. As of early April 2026, the Group managed over 2,100 primary and secondary schools on 8,000 hectares with a total value of NZ$33.5 billion; making it the second largest social property portfolio manager in the country.

On 18 July 2025, the Education Minister Erica Stanford and Infrastructure Minister would establish a new school property agency to address delivery shortcomings in the previous Labour Government's school property renovation programme. A ministerial inquiry established by the Sixth National Government had recommended that a new separate entity from the Ministry of Education be created to manage the school property portfolio. This arrangement would allow the Ministry of Education to focus on education policy and outcomes. Stanford said that the new property agency would be established from cost efficiencies.

The Government also established a Ministerial Advisory Group to assist with the transition to the new Crown agency. This group consisted of Murray McCully, Mark Binns, Rick Herd, Sarah Petersen and Craig Stobo. By mid-October 2025, the Ministry of Education had established an internal establishment unit to work with staff and stakeholders to facilitate the establishment of the new agency by 2026.
