= Diane Foreman =

New Zealand entrepreneur

Diane Foreman CNZM
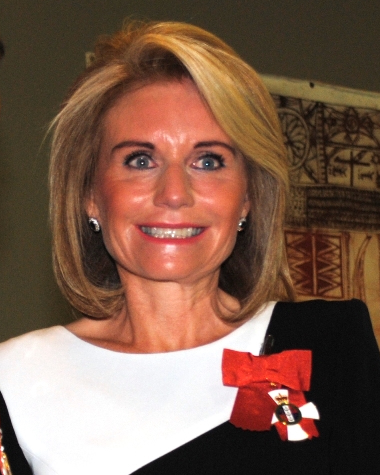
- Born: 1960
- Awards: NEXT Woman of the Year: Lifetime Achievement Award, New Zealand Business Hall of Fame, Companion of the New Zealand Order of Merit

Diane Shirley Foreman CNZM is a New Zealand businesswoman. In 2012 Foreman was appointed a Companion of the New Zealand Order of Merit for services to business. She was inducted into the New Zealand Business Hall of Fame in 2024.

== Early life and education ==
Foreman was born in 1960 or 1961 to a teenage mother, and was adopted into a working-class family. She says that they didn't value education for girls, "I was told that education for girls was unnecessary and all you needed was straight teeth and an ability to type". Foreman left school at 15 and worked as a shorthand typist. By 18 she was married and working as a secretary for Robert Kerridge. By her early twenties the marriage had ended and she had two children. Foreman also worked as a medical practice manager and a real estate agent.

== Business career ==
Foreman married businessman Bill Foreman in 1988, and was his third wife. He was thirty years older than her. Foreman was appointed to the board of Bill's plastics company Trigon Packaging Systems as Bill's representative when he had a stroke. Foreman managed the sale of the company. The couple set up an investment company, Emerald Group, which had real estate, recruitment, hotel, and food components.

In 2015 Foreman published In the Arena, a book on entrepreneurship.

== Honours and awards ==
In 2009 Foreman was named Ernst & Young's New Zealand Entrepreneur of the Year. In the 2012 New Year Honours Foreman was appointed a Companion of the New Zealand Order of Merit for services to business. In 2018 Foreman was awarded a NEXT Woman of the Year: Lifetime Achievement Award. In 2024 she was inducted into the New Zealand Business Hall of Fame.

== Personal life ==
Foreman says she separated from Bill Foreman around 2006. Foreman had an affair with then-Reserve Bank governor Don Brash before the end of his second marriage. Foreman refused to confirm the allegations, but Brash wrote about the relationship in his 2014 autobiography.

Foreman married broadcaster Paul Henry in 2020.
