= Thomas Brash =

New Zealand agriculturalist (1874–1957)

Thomas Brash CBE
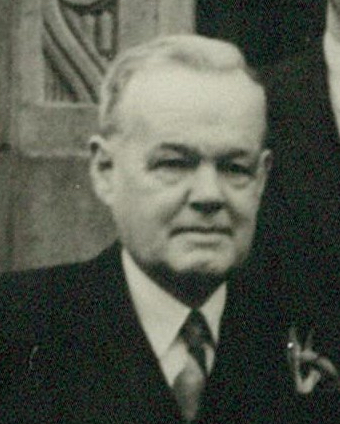
- Brash in 1948

Moderator of the Presbyterian Church of New Zealand
- In office 1944–1945
- Preceded by: David Herron
- Succeeded by: Jim McKenzie

Personal details
- Born: Thomas Cuddie Brash; 29 November 1874 Saddle Hill, New Zealand
- Died: 19 January 1957 (aged 82) Christchurch, New Zealand
- Spouse: Margaret Henrietta Allan (m. 1901)
- Children: 4
- Relatives: Alan Brash (son); Don Brash (grandson)

Thomas Cuddie Brash CBE (29 November 1874 – 19 January 1957) was a leading figure in New Zealand's dairy industry and one of only four lay moderators of the General Assembly in the history of the Presbyterian Church of Aotearoa New Zealand. He was the father of Presbyterian and Ecumenical church leader Alan Brash, and grandfather of governor of the Reserve Bank and leader of the National Party Don Brash.

== Family & childhood ==
Thomas Cuddie Brash was born to William Brash and Jane Parkinson Brash (née Cuddie) at Saddle Hill, near Dunedin, on 29 November 1874. His parents were descendants of Scottish settlers who lived in Dunedin, and they bought their own farm of 400 acres (1.6 km^{2}) at Mataura Island, Southland. Brash attended a small school near Yeovil, but had no formal secondary education.

== Dairy years ==
=== Apprenticeship ===
At 15 he was employed by his uncles James and Richard Cuddie as a boilerman in their dairy factory at Mosgiel. While in Mosgiel he joined the Taieri Ramblers’ Cycling Club and became well known for his successful cycle races.

=== Management ===
In 1895 he was appointed first assistant manager at the Wyndham dairy factory, where he learnt cheese-making. Dairy expert John Sawers arranged for him a successful application for the position of manager of Totara Flat dairy factory, near Reefton. The four directors who met him off the train, astounded at his youth, advised him of the difficulties of managing a dairy factory on the West Coast, and offered him the chance to withdraw. Brash, however, set to work improving the quality of the operations. Many had complained about the sour taste of the factory's butter, and Brash had his staff spend three months cleaning the factory with immediate success.

=== Christian conversion & church work ===
While at Totara Flat, Brash was rebuked by the local Presbyterian minister David Anderson for his lack of faith, and his indulgence in drinking, swearing and gambling. As a result, he became a regular attendee and committed member of the Presbyterian Church of Aotearoa New Zealand. He participated as an elder and a Bible Class leader, and was twice appointed president of the Bible Class Union.

=== North Island work ===
Brash left Totara Flat in 1898 to become manager of the Maketawa dairy factory in Taranaki. In 1903 he became manager of the Waverley dairy factory, and later moved to the Kairanga dairy factory. He gained a reputation for his demands for meticulous cleanliness.

He studied accountancy while in Waverley, and became a registered accountant in 1911.

=== Marriage & family ===
Brash married Margaret Henrietta Allen at Wyndham on 17 July 1901, with whom he had two daughters and two sons. One of his daughters Pearl married Dr Francis Bennett.

=== National Dairy Association ===
In 1910 Brash and his family moved to Wellington where he joined the National Dairy Association of New Zealand as an assistant secretary. He was appointed the association's representative in London in 1919, and in 1921 returned to New Zealand to become secretary. He worked diligently to promote New Zealand dairy produce in Britain, and helped to establish the New Zealand Dairy Produce Control Board (which became the New Zealand Dairy Board), for which he was appointed the inaugural secretary and chief executive for 16 years. He was also involved in the establishment of the Dairy Research Institute at Massey Agricultural College.

=== Other ventures ===
In 1915 he purchased an orchard in Nelson, which his son Jim managed for many years. He applied his knowledge of export controls and marketing, acquired through his position in the dairy industry, to the fruitgrowing market, and in 1924 was elected as president of the New Zealand Fruitgrower's Association. Other business ventures included Brash's role as director and chairman of a salt-producing company at Lake Grassmere.

He was honoured as a life member of the Federated Farmers of New Zealand. In the 1951 New Year Honours, Brash was appointed a Commander of the Order of the British Empire for services to the dairy and fruitgrowing industries. In 1953, he was awarded the Queen Elizabeth II Coronation Medal.

== Church years ==
=== Presbyterian Church ===
While in Wellington Brash became acquainted with leading Presbyterian minister James Gibb. As he got older he shifted his focus from agriculture and business to ecclesiastical matters. He continued as an elder, and by the end of his life had served the church for 51 years in that role. He was a church property trustee for 37 years and chairman of the trustees for 12 years. He chaired the Finance Committee, acted as convener of the Youth of the Church Committee in 1918, and in the 1940s was deeply involved in the Campaign for Christian Order. In 1944 he was only the second layman to be elected moderator of the General Assembly.

=== Ecumenical movement ===
Brash was a keen supporter of the ecumenical movement, laying the foundations for the more prominent role of his son Alan. He attended the meeting of churches adhering to the Presbyterian system at Lausanne in 1920, and participated in the inaugural meeting of the World Council of Churches in Amsterdam in 1948.

== Final years ==
Brash and his wife spent the last years of their lives troubled by ill health, and moved to Christchurch to live with their elder daughter Pearl Bennett and her husband.

Thomas Brash died on 19 January 1957.
