= Alan Brash =

New Zealand Presbyterian minister and activist

Alan Brash OBE
- Born: Alan Anderson Brash; 5 June 1913; Wellington, New Zealand
- Died: 24 August 2002 (aged 89)
- Education: University of Otago, MA in philosophy
- Spouse: Eljean Hill
- Children: 3
- Relatives: Thomas Brash (father); Don Brash (son)

Alan Anderson Brash OBE (5 June 1913 – 24 August 2002) was a leading minister of the Presbyterian Church of Aotearoa New Zealand, and of the worldwide ecumenical movement. He was the son of notable Presbyterian lay leader Thomas Brash, and the father of National party opposition leader and Governor of the Reserve Bank, Don Brash.

== Early years ==
Alan Anderson Brash was born in Wellington on 5 June 1913, the fourth child of Thomas Cuddie Brash and Margaret Henrietta Brash (née Allan). His father Thomas was a leading figure in New Zealand's dairy industry and one of only four lay Moderators of the General Assembly in the history of the Presbyterian Church of New Zealand.

== Education ==
Brash was raised in Miramar in Wellington, and raised in the Presbyterian Church under the teaching of Rev. James Gibb and Dr. John Allan. Brash underwent primary and secondary education in Wellington, before completing a MA in philosophy at the University of Otago. He then went to New College, Edinburgh, to study theology. While in the UK he represented the Presbyterian Church of New Zealand at the 1937 Faith and Order Conference in Edinburgh and the Life and Work conference in Oxford. Also in attendance was his future wife, Eljean Hill. These conferences became the springboard for the worldwide ecumenical movement and the platform for the World Council of Churches, and as a result Brash became a strong supporter of both.

== Parish ministry and family ==
Brash returned to New Zealand in 1938, and was appointed minister of St. Andrews parish in Wanganui. While in Wanganui he married Eljean Hill, and they had two children; Donald and Lynette. They also adopted an orphan boy from Edinburgh when the orphanage was closed by the war, and for a year they housed a refugee from Europe.

== Ecumenism ==
Brash's pacifist convictions made his ministerial duties difficult during the war years following his appointment. However his vision and leadership skills were quickly recognised, and in 1947 he was appointed General Secretary of the National Council of Churches in NZ, a position he held until 1964. From 1952 to 1956 he carried out these duties alongside a position in parish ministry at St Giles, Christchurch. However his zeal for the ecumenical movement led to his being appointed one of three professional staff members of the East Asian Christian Conference (now the Christian Conference of Asia) in 1957, and in 1964 he and his wife Eljean moved to Singapore to work full-time with the EACC. In this role he visited every country in Asia, apart from China, and did much to raise the profile of Asia within the church in New Zealand, and within the country generally, and for this he was appointed an Officer of the Order of the British Empire in the 1962 New Year Honours.

In 1968, he moved to London where he was appointed Director of Christian Aid for the British Council of Churches. Then in 1970 he moved to Geneva to work as head of the World Council of Churches Division on Inter-Church Aid, Refugee, and World Service. In 1974 he was appointed Deputy General Secretary of the World Council of Churches. In 1978 Brash retired from the World Council of Churches, and he and Eljean returned to New Zealand where Alan was elected to be Moderator of the General Assembly for a year.

== Later years ==
Through the 1980s Brash worked half time at the Auckland branch office of the National Council of Churches, continued to preach regularly, and was actively involved in the Mairangi Bay parish. In the early 1980s Brash was prominent in protests against Waitangi Day celebrations, which he felt ignored the many breaches of the Treaty of Waitangi. Eljean died in 1991, and Alan moved to Christchurch to live next door to his daughter Lynette.

== Death and legacy ==
Alan Brash died on 24 August 2002. The Presbyterian Church of Aotearoa summed up his life as: "A concern for justice for all people; a conviction that the Church should never forget that it is called to serve the poor of the world; an unwavering commitment to pacifism and the search for peace; and a life-long commitment to ecumenism and the unity of the Church were the hallmarks of Alan Brash's life. He saw these as challenges that should confront all who confess to follow Jesus Christ and he was absolute and fearless in his resolve to walk in that way."
