= Naisi Chen =

New Zealand politician

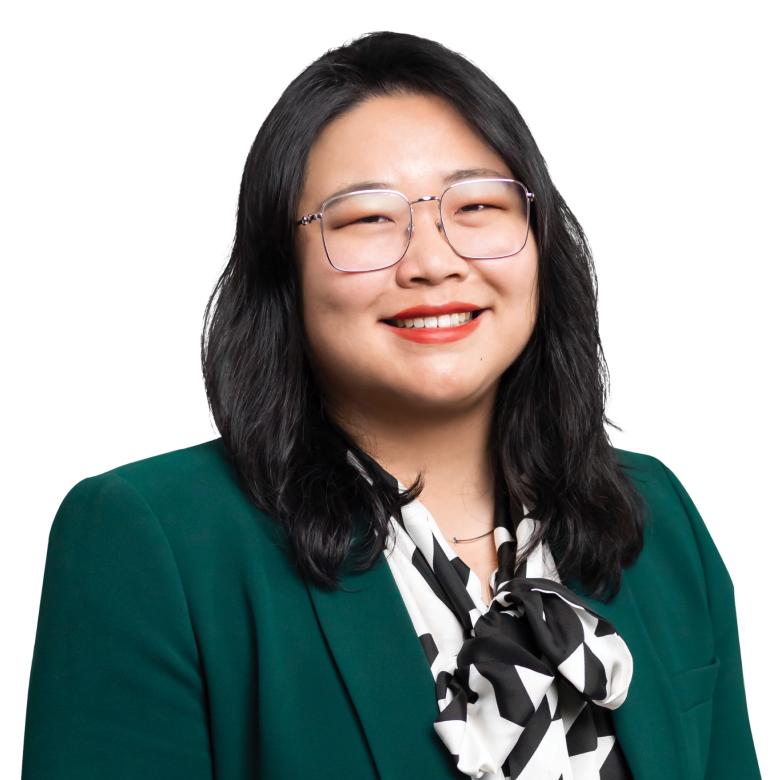
- Chen in 2026

Member of the New Zealand Parliament for Labour party list
- In office 17 October 2020 – 14 October 2023

Personal details
- Born: February 1994 (age 32) Beijing, China
- Party: Labour

Chinese name
- Traditional Chinese: 陳耐鍶
- Simplified Chinese: 陈耐锶
Transcriptions
Standard Mandarin
- Hanyu Pinyin: Chén Nàisī

Naisi Chen (Chinese: 陳耐鍶, born February 1994) is a New Zealand politician. She served as a Member of Parliament for the Labour Party from 2020 to 2023. Chen served as the Labour Party's candidate for Auckland Central during the 2023 and 2026 New Zealand general elections but was unsuccessful.

== Early life and career ==
Chen was born in Beijing, China and moved to New Zealand at age five. Her father is a Christian pastor and her mother is a doctor of traditional Chinese medicine. She attended Westlake Girls High School in Auckland before studying at the University of Auckland, graduating with a Bachelor of Arts and Bachelor of Laws in 2017.

She worked as president of the New Zealand Chinese Students' Association and as a director of a business consultancy firm. She was appointed to the board of Foundation North in 2019. A musician who learned piano, flute, double bass and tuba, she also sat on the board of the Auckland Philharmonia.

== Political career ==
New Zealand Parliament
Years	Term	Electorate	List	Party
2020–2023	53rd	List	38	Labour

Chen was asked to run as a Labour candidate at the 2017 general election by Raymond Huo. She was selected as a list candidate, ranked 50, then additionally selected for the East Coast Bays electorate after the previous Labour candidate withdrew. She was defeated in the electorate contest by National's Erica Stanford and not ranked high enough to be elected as a list MP.

She stood again at the 2020 election and was ranked 38 on the Labour Party list. Chen also contested the Botany electorate. Despite losing the Botany electorate to National's Christopher Luxon by a margin of 3,999 votes, she was ranked high enough on the Labour list to get into Parliament. In parliament, Chen sat on the governance and administration committee and was deputy chair (from 2020 to 2023) and chair (2023) of the economic development, science and innovation committee. She was the second youngest MP.

Ahead of the 2023 election, she sought the Labour Party nomination for Auckland Central but was unsuccessful. Instead, she contested East Coast Bays for a second time. Stanford retained the seat and, despite her improved list rank of 33, the party did not poll well enough for Chen to be re-elected.

In March 2026, she was selected as the Labour Party's candidate for Auckland Central in the 2026 New Zealand general election. Chen was ranked 34th on the Labour Party list. On 7 November, Chen came third place in the Auckland Central race, gaining 2,819 votes.

=== Alleged links to the Chinese Communist Party ===
In September 2017, New Zealand sinologist and University of Canterbury political scientist Anne-Marie Brady alleged in a conference paper that Chen had "close […] connections" to the United Front, a network of groups and individuals and strategy the Chinese Communist Party (CCP) uses to advance its agenda. Brady cited Chen's leadership of New Zealand Chinese Students' Association, a "united front-related organization", as evidence. Chen said she felt "hurt" by the accusations. Prior to the 2020 election, members of the group New Zealand Values Alliance distributed flyers in Auckland alleging that Chen was a "CCP agent".
