= Erica Stanford =

New Zealand National Party politician

The Honourable Erica Stanford MP
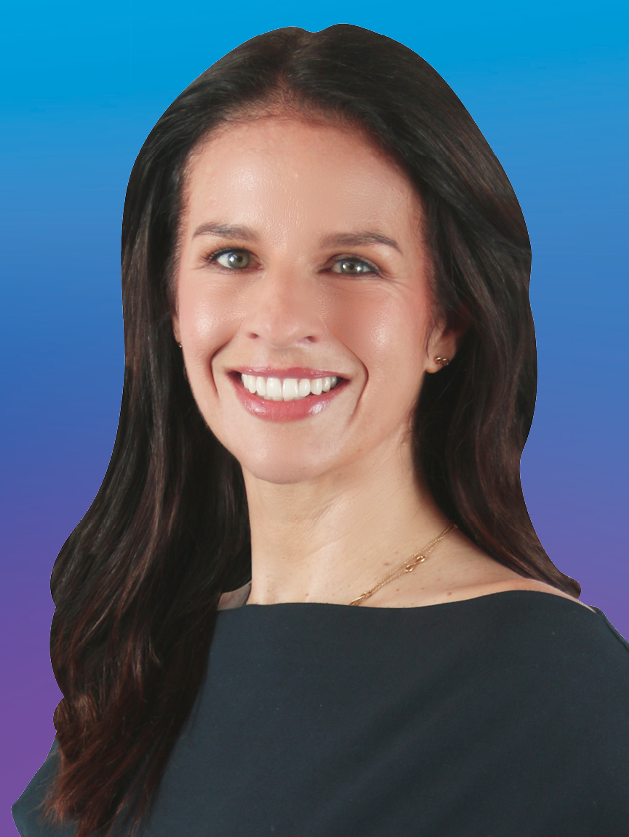
- Stanford in 2023

49th Minister of Education
- Incumbent
- Assumed office 27 November 2023
- Prime Minister: Christopher Luxon
- Preceded by: Jan Tinetti

60th Minister of Immigration
- Incumbent
- Assumed office 27 November 2023
- Prime Minister: Christopher Luxon
- Preceded by: Andrew Little

1st Minister Responsible for The Royal Commission of Inquiry into Abuse in Care
- Incumbent
- Assumed office 26 January 2024
- Prime Minister: Christopher Luxon
- Preceded by: Jan Tinetti (as Minister of Internal Affairs)

Member of the New Zealand Parliament for East Coast Bays
- Incumbent
- Assumed office 23 September 2017
- Preceded by: Murray McCully
- Majority: 20,353

Personal details
- Born: Erica Louise Poppelbaum; 1978 (age 47–48)
- Party: National
- Spouse: Kane Stanford
- Children: 2
- Website: ericastanford.national.org.nz

Erica Louise Stanford (née Poppelbaum; born 1978) is a New Zealand politician and Member of Parliament in the House of Representatives for the National Party. She currently serves as the 49th Minister of Education and the 60th Minister of Immigration in the Sixth National Government of New Zealand.

== Personal life ==
Stanford lives in Ōkura in the Auckland region and is the daughter of a Dutch immigrant father. She holds a Bachelor of Arts in politics from the University of Auckland, and cites lecturer Raymond Miller as the reason for her passion for politics. She is married, meeting her husband Kane while at Rangitoto College, and has two children.

Stanford worked in export sales for six years and spent time producing local television shows. This included being the producer of a reality TV show called Noise Control, in which she and a camera operator followed a noise control team around Auckland. In filming one episode, a person pointed a gun at her and her cameraman; the episode was one of the most-watched in the series. She also produced the show Last Chance Dog, and wrote scripts and did other work on Piha Rescue for more than six years.

== Political career ==
New Zealand Parliament
Years	Term	Electorate	List	Party
2017–2020	52nd	East Coast Bays	65	National
2020–2023	53rd	East Coast Bays	39	National
2023–2026	54th	East Coast Bays	7	National
2026–present	55th	East Coast Bays	5	National

In 2013, Stanford took over from her sister working in the office of Murray McCully, the National Party MP for East Coast Bays. She joined the National Party at the same time. When she started in the office, she worked there two days a week as one of three jobs while also having two children. She later worked there full time, and prior to running for parliament, she held the role of Senior MP Support. Stanford describes McCully as her mentor, calling him "a political master."

=== In opposition, 2017–2023 ===
McCully retired from Parliament in 2017, and the National Party selected Stanford as his replacement for East Coast Bays. Stanford had not previously stood for parliament or other office. The East Coast Bays electorate has been a safe seat for National since 1987; since then McCully held either East Coast Bays or Albany, which covered a similar area. In the 2017 general election, Stanford won the electorate easily, with 66% of the vote.

In the 2020 election, Stanford stood again for East Coast Bays. During the campaign she also attended a debate of Auckland Central candidates, as National had not selected a new candidate for the electorate by the debate. Stanford retained East Coast Bays by a margin of 8,764 votes.

Stanford was promoted as the spokesperson for education and associate spokesperson for Ethnic Communities while retaining her portfolio for immigration on 6 December 2021, in the Shadow Cabinet of Christopher Luxon. This led to her being promoted from a rank of 25 in the Shadow Cabinet of Judith Collins to 7 under Luxon.

=== In Government, 2023–present ===
During the 2023 election, Stanford retained East Coast Bays by a margin of 20,353 votes, defeating Labour's candidate Naisi Chen. Following the formation of the National-led coalition government, she assumed the portfolios of Minister of Education and Minister of Immigration.

On 26 January 2024, Prime Minister Christopher Luxon added responsibility for the government's response to the Royal Commission of Inquiry into Abuse in Care to Stanford's portfolios. Stanford succeeds previous Ministers of Internal Affairs Jan Tinetti and Tracey Martin in having responsibility for the Royal Commission.

On 11 August 2026, the National Party became surrounded by rumours of a leadership challenge. Stanford, alongside Attorney-General Chris Bishop, were cited as the two most likely candidates to replace Luxon as party leader and Prime Minister.

==== Education ====
On 27 January 2024 Stanford, in her capacity as Education Minister, announced an inquiry into school property projects. She said that the Government had inherited an education system "bordering on crisis". Stanford confirmed that the Ministry of Education had identified 350 projects that had exceeded their budget and had paused 20 building projects.

On 29 April 2024, Stanford announced the Government's top six educational priorities to mark the start of the second term. These included a clearer curriculum, focusing on literacy and numeracy, more consistent assessment and achievement reporting, better teacher training, targeted support for students with special needs and an evidence-based approach to educational improvement. That same day, the Government's school cellphone ban came into force. On 2 May, Stanford confirmed that the Government would be mandating a structured literacy approach in all state schools from 2025. In addition, Stanford confirmed that the Government would end funding for the existing reading recovery programme, which utilises a "whole language" approach based on using pictures to help children guess words.

On 26 May 2024, Stanford announced that the Government would invest NZ$53 million in education including in-school training for new teachers and recruiting, retaining and training 1,500 new teachers (including 300 overseas teachers) over the next four years.

In early August 2024, Stanford and Luxon announced the Government's "Maths Action Plan" to roll out a new mathematics curriculum from 2025. The new curriculum would including twice-annual maths assessments, new teaching resources for primary and secondary schools, boosting funding for teaching professional development and remedial support, and raising maths entry requirements for new teachers. In response, the New Zealand Educational Institute expressed concerns that rapid changes to the maths and literacy curriculum and the short teaching training timeframe would strain the teaching workforce without delivering on its goals.

On 26 September 2024, Stanford announced the Government would allocate NZ$30 million from the "Te Ahu o te Reo Māori" teacher training programme to revamping the school maths curriculum.

On 21 November 2024, Stanford apologised after allegedly swearing at Labour's education spokesperson Jan Tinetti during a Parliamentary Question Time session. Labour MP Duncan Webb had complained about Stanford's unparliamentary remark to the House Speaker and suggested that she apologise for her comment. Stanford subsequently withdrew her remark and apologised.

On 10 December 2024, Stanford confirmed that the Government would revise the sex education curriculum after a critical Education Review Office report found inconsistencies in schools' sex education teaching. The Government had last revised the sex education curriculum 20 years ago.

In mid-February 2025, Stanford reversed Associate Education Minister David Seymour's decision to scrap "teacher only days" during the 2025 school terms. She approved four "teacher only days" in 2025 for state schools to implement the new curriculum.

On 28 April 2025, Stanford announced that the Government would invest $53 million in covering teachers' registration and practising certificate fees as part of an effort to help the teaching sector. From 1 July, Stanford said that 115,000 eligible early childhood and school teachers would save up to $550 over the next three years. This announcement was welcomed by the Post Primary Teachers' Association. On 30 April, Stanford and Finance Minister Nicola Willis confirmed that the Government would be introducing financial literacy into the primary school curriculum from 2027 as part of the social sciences curriculum.

On 4 May 2025, Stanford launched the Government's new "Parent Portal," which is designed to provide parents with information about what children were being taught in the school curriculum particularly English and mathematics, phonic tips, structured literacy and tips for parent-teacher interviews.

On 5 May, 1News reported that Stanford had used her personal Gmail account to send pre-Budget announcements prior to the release of the 2024 New Zealand budget. The emails included personal correspondence with her staff, school principals and various organisations. Using a personal email account is considered a potential breach of the Cabinet Manual since it opens the risk of confidential government information being hacked or stolen.

On 16 July, Stanford announced that the Government would be ending open-plan class rooms, which had been introduced in 2011 by the Fifth National Government. On 18 July, Stanford announced that the Government would create a new Crown agency called the New Zealand School Property Agency, which would be responsible for managing the building, maintenance and administration of school buildings.

On 4 August, Stanford and Luxon confirmed the Government would be phasing out the National Certificate of Educational Achievement (NCEA) secondary school qualification by 2030. In late August 2025, 89 secondary school principals issued an open letter to Education Minister Stanford and Acting Secretary for Education Ellen MacGregor-Reid, calling for the Government to halt plans to replace the NCEA school qualification. They said that Government's changes were motivated by ideology and claimed that the new secondary curriculum would harm disadvantaged teenagers particularly Māori and Pasifika New Zealanders. The principals also expressed concern that the replacement system was designed for university-bound students over non-academic students. In response, Stanford said that she had consulted with the education sector including her advisory group of principals in developing the new secondary school qualification. She reiterated that the Government remained committed to replacing NCEA but sought to reassure principals and schools that there would be a phased, planned and supported implementation of the new qualification framework.

In mid-August 2025, Radio New Zealand reported that Stanford had decided in October 2024 to exclude most Māori language words except for characters' names in the Education Ministry's "Ready to Read Phonics Plus" (RtRPP) series. In response, Stanford said that the decision only affected 12 books within the series and that 27 books with Māori words would be reprinted. In early September 2025, Stanford disputed claims by several teachers and principals that the Government was reducing references to the Treaty of Waitangi and Māori words in education documents and curriculum statements. She reiterated the Government's commitment to the Treaty and raising educational achievements for Māori children.

In mid September 2025, Stanford announced that the Government would introduce several new STEM–oriented subjects for Years 11 to 13 students from 2028. These new subjects include earth science, space science, statistics, data science, electronics, mechatronics, civics education, philosophy, media studies, Māori and Pasifika studies, and various industry-led subjects. She also confirmed that the indigenous Māori curriculum Te Marautanga o Aotearoa would be resourced with a new detailed curriculum and new subjects focusing on traditional Māori cosmology, wood carving and Māori culture.

In late October 2025, Stanford released the Government's full draft of the curriculum for Years 0-10 students for consultation. The draft curriculum covered several subjects including the social sciences, science, health & physical education, the arts, technology and languages. The new curriculum is expected to be rolled out in three stages between 2026 and 2028. In response, principals, maths and history teachers criticised the proposed new curriculum for what they regarded as its "unworkable" timeframe, "burdensome" requirements on teachers and students, and for allegedly devaluing the Treaty of Waitangi and minority perspectives.

On 4 November 2025, Stanford confirmed that the Government would amend the Education and Training Act's provision for schools to implement the Treaty of Waitangi, stating that it was the responsibility of the New Zealand Crown rather than schools. She said that schools would focus on promoting equitable outcomes for Māori students, offering Māori language instruction and "cultural competence." The policy change was criticised by the New Zealand School Boards Association, the Principals Federation, the New Zealand Educational Institute and the National Iwi Chairs Forum, who expressed concern it would lead to the purge of Māori language and cultural training from the school curriculum. By 13 November, over 200 school boards had penned letters to Stanford objecting to the proposed law change. By 23 November, 1,007 schools had reaffirmed their commitment to the Treaty of Waitangi.

In November 2025, Stanford announced major reforms to the Teaching Council of Aotearoa New Zealand, including plans to shrink its size, shift most professional standard-setting responsibilities for initial teacher education to the Ministry of Education, and change the council’s composition so that a majority of members would be ministerial appointees. She said the changes were necessary to improve teacher preparation and governance, citing OECD TALIS 2024 data and an Education Review Office report showing many principals believed new teachers were underprepared. Teachers’ unions criticised the plan as a “power grab”, arguing it undermined the independence and professionalism of teachers. The Post Primary Teachers' Association said Stanford was selectively using evidence and warned that political control over the council could deter teachers from speaking out. Representatives of the New Zealand Educational Institute also objected, saying the reforms imposed political control rather than address underlying issues such as resourcing and learning-support pressures.

In late January 2026, Stanford announced that two new specialist schools for children with high and complex needs would be established in Auckland and Palmerston North. The Auckland school is expected to open by Term 2 in 2027 and the Palmerston North school is expected to open by Term 1 in 2028. These would be the first specialist schools established in New Zealand since 1977.

On 17 March 2026, Stanford announced that the Education Review Office would be introducing a new colour-coded, four-point school rating system. The rating system would cover 14 areas including student achievement, student progress, teaching, reading, writing, mathematics and attendance.

Throughout 2026, former Ministry of Education official Claire Coleman, several principals and teachers' associations criticised the Government's overhaul of the education curriculum across several subjects including physical education, music, technology, the arts, science and social sciences. Key grievances included an emphasis on standardised testing, a rushed implementation timeframe, content overload, insufficient support, and the reduced influence of the Treaty of Waitangi. In response to criticism from educators, Stanford reiterated the Government's commitment to lifting student achievement disputed claims of insufficient resourcing, saying that the Government had investing in school resources, teacher development, and provided teachers with a curriculum change allowance following negotiations with the New Zealand Educational Institute. She also defended the government's curriculum reforms and said she was working with principal associations on the timeline of the curriculum changes.

In mid-May 2026, Stanford incorporated new checks on homeschooling parents into the final version of the Education and Training (System Reform) Amendment Bill, which had already passed its second reading in Parliament. She had made these changes following a critical report about homeschooling and child safety at the isolated Gloriavale Christian Community's West Cost commune. These changes were incorporated into the bill on 26 May without consultation from the homeschooling community. Prior to its third reading scheduled for 27 May, Stanford abruptly announced that the reading would be delayed so that the homeschooling-related amendments could be withdrawn. Stanford said she had withdrawn these proposals following discussions with the National Party's coalition partner, New Zealand First, and that the Government would take "extra time" to incorporate homeschooling changes into law. The Government's withdrawal of the homeschooling changes were welcomed by the National Council of Home Educators, NZ First, ACT, Labour, Green and Māori parties.

==== Immigration ====
On 7 April 2024 Stanford, as Immigration Minister, announced that the Government would be revising the Accredited Employer Worker Visa programme to address migrant exploitation and "unsustainable" net migration.

In late June 2024, Stanford announced that low-skilled Accredited Employer Work Visa (AEWV) holders at Australian and New Zealand Standard Classification of Occupations (ANZSCO) levels 4 and 5 (the equivalent of NCEA Levels 1, 2 and 3) would no longer be able to sponsor work, visitor or student visa applications for partners and dependent children. Stanford had earlier said that changes to the AEWV scheme were prompted by the Government's desire to strike a balance between recruiting highly-skilled migrants and reducing pressure on infrastructure, health and education services. The Union Network of Migrants, a division of FIRST Union, criticised Stanford for failing to engage with migrants, community groups and migrant advocates.

In August 2024, Stuff reported that Stanford had declined a motion by the Dunedin City Council to create a special visa pathway for the Gazan relatives of Palestinian New Zealanders displaced by the Gaza war, stating that any future decision about visa pathway changes would be made at the Cabinet-level. Stanford also turned down a request from Mayor of Dunedin Jules Radich, Dunedin Councillor Christine Garey and local Palestinian leader Mai Tamimi to discuss the matter, citing pressures in her Minister's diary.

In April 2025, Stanford introduced government legislation into Parliament that would allow refugees' residency visas to be cancelled if they posed a risk to the community.

On 8 June 2025, Stanford announced the multi-entry "Parent Boost" visa, which would allow the parents of migrants to live in New Zealand for between five to ten years. Visa holders would have to meet certain health, character and financial criteria including having at least one year of health insurance cover.

On 15 June, Stanford and Luxon announced that the Government would be launching a three-month visa waiver trial for Chinese citizens with valid Australian visitor, work, family or student visas from November 2025. On 18 June, Stanford followed up with an announcement that Chinese nationals would no longer need to apply for transit visas from November 2025 and would be eligible to apply for the New Zealand Electronic Travel Authority (NZETA).

On 10 August 2025, Stanford announced two new seasonal work visas: the Global Workforce Seasonal Visa for agricultural and horticultural workers, and the Peak Seasonal Visa for short-term agricultural and aquaculture workers. The Global Workforce Visa is valid for three years while the Peak Seasonal Visa is valid for seven months.

On 4 September 2025, Stanford confirmed that the Government would amend the Immigration Act to make it easier to deport non-citizens. Key proposed changes have included raising the threshold for deporting permanent residents from 10 to 20 years; widening the criteria for deportation to include historical crimes committed overseas, providing misleading information and being accidentally granted a visa; increasing the enforcement powers of immigration officers and raising the prison term for migrant exploitation from 7 to 10 years. In response to criticism, Stanford said that proposed deportation changes were a response to the Australian-born Danny and Roberto Jaz, who were convicted in 2023 for drugging and sexually assaulting over 20 women at the Mama Hooch bar and Venuti restaurant in Christchurch between 2015 and 2018.

In mid-June 2026, Stanford criticised Ministry of Business, Innovation and Employment (MBIE) and Immigration New Zealand officials for allegedly misleading her and her predecessors Kris Faafoi and Andrew Little about the failed NZ$33 million Immigration Biometric Upgrade project, which ran between November 2018 and November 2025 without delivering anything. During a Parliament education and workforce select committee meeting, Stanford alleged that MBIE officials used "creative accounting" to avoid scrutiny from the New Zealand Cabinet and misled Crown ministers about the cost and progress of the project. In response, the Public Service Commission and MBIE launch separate investigations into the Immigration Biometric Upgrade Project and another similar IT upgrade project called "Our Future Services."

In late July 2026, Stanford announced that the Government would amend the Recognised Seasonal Employer scheme to "simplify" the process and protect seasonal workers.

==== Royal Commission of Inquiry into Abuse in Care ====
As Minister in charge of the Royal Commission of Inquiry into Abuse in Care, Stanford announced on 30 October 2024 that the Government would address a parity issue in a NZ$6.5 million compensation settlement with 95 Lake Alice Hospital survivors in 2001. Survivors received an average of NZ$41,000 in individual payments, with NZ$27,000 being deducted in legal fees for each claimant. Further claimants received an average of NZ$70,000 since the New Zealand Crown covered their legal costs. While Stanford confirmed that survivors would be reimbursed between NZ$15,000 and NZ$55,000 each, these reimbursements would not be adjusted for inflation.

On 18 December 2024, Stanford announced that the Government would offer survivors of torture at Lake Alice Hospital a lump payment of at least NZ$150,000, having set aside NZ$22.68 million for the redress scheme. In addition, survivors could request for an individual assessment from an independent arbitrator.

On 19 February 2025, Stanford confirmed that the Government had established a NZ$2 million dual purpose fund to honour children who had died in care in unmarked graves and to support community initiatives for abuse survivors.

==== 2026 general election ====
During the 2026 New Zealand general election, Stanford contested the East Coast Bays electorate for National. She was ranked fifth on the National Party list. Based on preliminary results, Stanford retained East Coast Bays by a landslide margin of 13,819 votes.

== Views and positions ==
In her maiden speech Stanford spoke on matters of conservation, sustainability, marriage based on love rather than gender, and a desire to see political parties work with one another to seek enduring, practical solutions. In a 2018 interview, she said her priorities in her first term included resourcing police stations in her electorate, improving local roading projects, and supporting local schools.

Stanford's political views sit on the progressive side of the National Party. She supported decriminalising abortion and allowing euthanasia in conscience votes in 2019. She has sat on the environmental select committee and has been involved in developing National's environmental policies. In 2019 she supported students who were striking for climate action, despite her party leader and many other National MPs initially opposing them. She believes that the Green Party could work with National, saying that if the Greens "could just relax a little bit... they could do so much good." Stanford says that her blood "runs blue and it always will", but acknowledges a touch of green, saying "maybe it's a tealy blue".

In late May 2025, Stanford expressed regret for remarks she had made in Parliament in early May 2025 likening unsolicited emails from Indians seeking immigration advice to "spam." She told Radio New Zealand that she did not intend to cause offence with her remarks, saying: "You know, it wasn't my intent to draw out one particular country. It was just a recent example that I happened to have in my head at the time." Labour MP Priyanca Radhakrishnan, who is an Indian New Zealander, accused Stanford of singling out people based on their nationality.

New Zealand Parliament
Preceded by Murray McCully	Member of Parliament for East Coast Bays; 2017–present	Incumbent
Political offices
Preceded by Jan Tinetti	Minister of Education; 2023–present	Incumbent
Preceded by Andrew Little	Minister of Immigration; 2023–present	Incumbent
