= Gary Knapp =

New Zealand politician

7th Leader of the Democratic Party
- In office 22 August 1988 – 22 April 1991
- Deputy: Terry Heffernan
- Preceded by: Neil Morrison
- Succeeded by: John Wright

Member of the New Zealand Parliament for East Coast Bays
- In office 6 September 1980 – 15 August 1987
- Preceded by: Frank Gill
- Succeeded by: Murray McCully

Personal details
- Born: Gary Thomas Knapp; 1947 (age 78–79) Auckland, New Zealand
- Party: National (1971-1977); Social Credit (1978–1985); Democrats (1985–1996)
- Other political affiliations: New Zealand First
- Children: 4

Gary Thomas Knapp (born 1947) is a former New Zealand politician of the Social Credit Party.

== Biography ==
=== Early life and career ===
Knapp was born in 1947. He went into business and owned his own rental firm until he sold it in 1978. He then worked part time as a real estate agent until 1980.

=== Political career ===
New Zealand Parliament
Years	Term	Electorate	Party
1980–1981	39th	East Coast Bays	Social Credit
1981–1984	40th	East Coast Bays	Social Credit
1984–1985	41st	East Coast Bays	Social Credit
1985–1987	Changed allegiance to:		Democrats

Knapp became involved in politics and in 1971 he joined the National Party. He later changed his affiliation in 1977 and joined the Social Credit Party. At the 1978 election he contested the seat of East Coast Bays where he had boosted Social Credit's vote from 5% to 20%, though not winning the seat it was one of the party's best results at the election. He later became the Member of Parliament for East Coast Bays when he defeated National candidate Don Brash at a 1980 by-election caused by the resignation of the sitting National MP. Knapp joined Bruce Beetham in parliament, where they both had high profiles. In 1981 Knapp was elected deputy leader at the party's annual conference.

In the 1984 election, while Beetham lost Rangitikei to a National Party challenger, Knapp retained East Coast Bays, and another Social Credit candidate, Neil Morrison, won Pakuranga. Beetham continued as leader despite losing his seat and in 1985 Knapp failed to convince him to stand aside. Beetham did endorse Knapp to succeed him whenever he chose to retire. Beetham kept stalling his retirement leading to Knapp resigning as deputy leader in protest. Morrison was later elected to replace Beetham as leader.

In the 1987 election Knapp and Morrison were both defeated by National candidates. The next year Morrison resigned as leader and Knapp was elected at the party's 1988 conference as leader. In November that same year Knapp and eleven supporters entered Parliament House in Wellington and locked themselves in a committee room. They occupied the room for two days using the publicity to demand the government keep its word to hold a referendum on switching to a proportional representation electoral system. Following the occupation, the Speaker of the House of Representatives, Kerry Burke, stripped Knapp of his privileges as a former Member of Parliament which barred him from entering parliament buildings (unless accompanied by an MP) and claiming reduced air fares. Knapp claimed the move was "petty" and would cost him $10,000 a year in air fares and claimed it was motivated by a government wishing to restrict the movements of its political opponents. Afterwards he was challenged for the party leadership at the 1990 party conference by Mary Tierney, the Democrat candidate for Eden, but he easily defeated the challenge by 90 votes to 8.

In 1990, Knapp was awarded the New Zealand 1990 Commemoration Medal. He led the Democrats at the 1990 election and contested East Coast Bays once again without success. He decided to step down as leader at the 1991 party conference.

Knapp was always critical of the Democrats decision to join the Alliance which he charged with overwhelming the Democrats identity due to being dominated by the NewLabour Party and in 1996 he quit the party. Following his breaking with the Democrats he was involved with New Zealand First.

=== Post-politics ===
After leaving active politics he returned to real estate becoming an agent in 1993, first in Auckland and later Port Macquarie, Australia.

== Notes ==
New Zealand Parliament
Preceded by Frank Gill	Member of Parliament for East Coast Bays; 1980–1987	Succeeded by Murray McCully
Party political offices
Preceded by Neil Morrison	Leader of the Democratic Party; 1988–1991	Succeeded by John Wright
Preceded by Jeremy Dwyer	Deputy Leader of the Social Credit Party; 1981–1985	Succeeded by Alasdair Thompson
