= New Zealand Chinese Students' Association =

Chinese student organization in New Zealand

- 新西兰中国学生联合会
- Abbreviation: NZCSA
- Established: 1996
- Location: Auckland, New Zealand
- Members: 3,000 total
- Official language: English, Mandarin Chinese
- President: Rebecca Lee
- Affiliations: Auckland University Students' Association
- Staff: 115
- Volunteers: 100
- Website: nzcsa.myuniclub.com

The New Zealand Chinese Students’ Association (NZCSA) is an incorporated student society that aims to serve Chinese students in New Zealand, promoting the Chinese Culture and act as a bridge between the Chinese student community and the local mainstream community.

== History ==
Starting in 1996, the NZCSA began its life as a student initiative to connect Chinese students in New Zealand who shared the same vision, providing them with a chance to expand their capabilities as well as associate with like-minded young leaders.

== Services ==
Since then, the NZCSA has become the largest Chinese student organisation while establishing itself as a reputable entity in the local business community. NZCSA sees around 800 new members each year and currently has a committee of 65 students. It holds over 4000 members in the member database as means of advertising to and bringing influence for its own values and business opportunities. NZCSA has a strong presence across multiple channels including Wechat, Sina Weibo, Facebook and Skykiwi forums.

The NZCSA hosts a range of events from Ski Trips to "Xue-Tang" Exam Tutorials. Its major annual events attract over 100 participants with advertisements covering the entire city campus of the University of Auckland (UoA), while it has co-operating business partners (around 60) and partnerships with Chinese student organisations in all major tertiary institutes. On top of the NZCSA's events, there are also joint events it holds with ASIA – an alliance of all Asian student organisations in the University of Auckland, such as the Grande Royale Ball and the Halloween Party. The NZCSA also has strong relationships with media companies and holds industrial and professional contacts with production companies.

== Presidium ==
The 2023 Presidium of NZCSA consists of 1 President, 1 Vice-President and 1 Secretary-General.

Presidents of the New Zealand Chinese Students' Association
No.	President	Citizenship	Vice President	Citizenship	Vice President	Citizenship	Took office	Left office	Note
1	Jianhua Gong	China					1 March 1996	28 February 1997	
2	Jianhua Gong	China					1 March 1997	28 February 1998	
3	Jianhua Gong	China					1 March 1998	28 February 1999	
4	Weitao Ning	China					1 March 1999	29 February 2000	
5	Weitao Ning	China					1 March 2000	28 February 2001	
6	Weitao Ning	China					1 March 2001	28 February 2002	
7	Yangyang Li	China					1 March 2002	28 February 2003	
8	Yangyang Li	China					1 March 2003	29 February 2004	
9	Nancy Yinghua Hu	China	Maxwell Hui Wang	China			1 March 2004	28 February 2005	
10	Nancy Yinghua Hu	China	Tony Zhuoran Tang	China	Steven Zhong	China	1 March 2005	30 June 2006	Term of Office Changed.
11	Tony Zhuoran Tang	China	Michael Xiaoyue Gao	China	Eric Zhang	China	1 July 2006	30 June 2007	
12	Tony Zhuoran Tang	China	Michael Xiaoyue Gao	China			1 July 2008	30 June 2008	
13	David Jun Jiang	China	James Zhenbang Sun	New Zealand	Chantel Chang Fu	China	1 July 2008	30 June 2009	
14	David Jun Jiang	China	James Zhenbang Sun	New Zealand	Chantel Chang Fu	China	1 July 2009	30 June 2010	
15	Krono Yichen Wei	New Zealand	Henry Zheng Miao	China	Chloe Ke Lou	New Zealand	1 July 2010	30 June 2011	
16	Krono Yichen Wei	New Zealand	Henry Zheng Miao	China	Chloe Ke Lou	New Zealand	1 July 2011	30 June 2012	
17	Anna Xue Yang	China	Alice Choi	Macau	Steven Yiran Wang	China	1 July 2012	30 June 2013	
18	Anna Xue Yang	China	Daniel Lingfeng Wang	China	Sophia Huimin Zheng	China	1 July 2013	31 December 2013	Term of Office Changed.
19	Eric Fei Wang	China	Bean Bin Wang	China	Catherine Kexin Ouyang	New Zealand	1 January 2014	31 December 2014	
20	Bean Bin Wang	China	Morris Ruoyu Miao	China	Max Zhewei Gong	New Zealand	1 January 2015	31 December 2015	
21	Naisi Chen	New Zealand	Morris Ruoyu Miao	China	Rosa Zhendong Guo	China	1 January 2016	31 December 2016	
22	Alice Muyun Xu	New Zealand	Martin Tianli Ma	China	Heidi Zhengyi Zhou	China	1 January 2017	31 December 2017	
23	Heidi Zhengyi Zhou	China	Cindy Xinyue Wang	China	Anna Ruian Huang	China	1 January 2018	31 December 2018	
24	Neyra Rong Nie	China	Richard Ming Xuan Li	New Zealand			1 January 2019	31 December 2019	
25	Summer Jing Xia	China	Dorothy Ziqi Feng	China			1 January 2020	31 December 2020	
26	Summer Jing Xia	China					1 January 2021	31 December 2021	
27	Estella Liu; Ferry Feng	China; China					1 January 2022	31 December 2022	
28	Alvin Meng; Cissy Xiang	New Zealand; China					1 January 2023	31 December 2023	
29	Wendy Wang	China					1 January 2024	31 December 2024	
30	Colly Zhou	China					1 January 2025	31 December 2025	
31	Rebecca Lee	New Zealand	Guo Yang	China	Leo Liang	New Zealand	1 January 2026		

== Executive Group ==
The 2026 Executive Group of NZCSA consists of: 1 President, 2 Vice-President, 1 Secretary-General, 2 Directors of Operations, 1 Director of Business Development, 2 Directors of Human Resources, 2 Directors of Information Technology, 1 Director of Finance, 1 Director of Marketing and 1 Director of Video Production.

=== 2026 ===
2026 Executive Group of the New Zealand Chinese Students' Association
Position	Name	Citizenship	Note
President	Rebecca Lee	New Zealand	Incumbent
Vice President	Guo Yang Leo Liang	China New Zealand	Incumbent
Secretary General	Roy Xu	China	Incumbent
Director of Finance	Yifei Liu	China	Incumbent
Director of Human Resources	Blair Wang	China	Incumbent
Associate Director of Human Resources	Colly Zhou	China	Incumbent
Director of Information Technology	Jack Zhu	China	Incumbent
Director of Information Technology	Johnny Lee	China	Incumbent
Director of Business Development	Angelina Wang	China	Incumbent
Director of Operations	Riko Ma	China	Incumbent
Associate Director of Operations	Vivian Wu	China	Incumbent
Director of Marketing	Guo Yang	China	Incumbent
Director of Video Production	Yoyo Pu	New Zealand	Incumbent
Manager of Video Production	Jing Zeng	China	Incumbent

=== 2025 ===
2025 Executive Group of the New Zealand Chinese Students' Association
Position	Name	Citizenship	Note
President	Colly Zhou	China	Incumbent
Secretary General	Leo Liang Richel Song	New Zealand; New Zealand	Incumbent
Director of Finance	Freya Li	China	Incumbent
Director of Human Resources	Guo Yang	China	Incumbent
Director of Information Technology	Jack Zhu	China	Incumbent
Director of Business Development	Angelina Wang	China	Incumbent
Associate Director of Business Development	Cairong Mao	China	Incumbent
Director of Operations	Rebecca Lee	New Zealand	Incumbent
Associate Director of Operations	Shirley Zhou Riko Ma	China China	Incumbent
Director of Marketing	Yoyo Pu	New Zealand	Incumbent

=== 2024 ===
2024 Executive Group of the New Zealand Chinese Students' Association
Position	Name	Citizenship	Note
President	Wendy Wang	China	Incumbent
Secretary General	Kelvin Ao	China	Incumbent
Director of Finance	Laura Li	China	Incumbent
Director of Human Resources	Guo Yang	China	Incumbent
Director of Information Technology	Bill Shao	China	Incumbent
Associate Director of Information Technology	Kevin Liang	New Zealand	Incumbent
Director of Business Development	Cora Bai	China	Incumbent
Associate Director of Business Development	Angelina Wang	China	Incumbent
Associate Director of Business Development	Nancy He	China	Incumbent
Director of Operations	Colly Zhou	China	Incumbent
Associate Director of Operations	Richel Song	New Zealand	Incumbent
Co-Director of Marketing	Annie Li	China	Incumbent

=== 2023 ===
2023 Executive Group of the New Zealand Chinese Students' Association
Position	Name	Citizenship	Note
Co-President	Alvin Kaisen Meng	New Zealand	Incumbent
Co-President	Cissy Xiang	China	Incumbent
Director of Finance	Wendy Wang	China	Incumbent
Co-Director of Human Resources	Christina Li	China	Incumbent
Co-Director of Human Resources	William Yan	China	Incumbent
Director of Information Technology	Tommer Hu	China	Incumbent
Associate Director of Information Technology	Alex Liang	China	Incumbent
Director of Business Development	Seraph Zhou	China	Incumbent
Associate Director of Business Development	Faye Liu	China	Incumbent
Director of Operations	Leo Shilong Liang	New Zealand	Incumbent
Associate Director of Operations	Skyla Liu	China	Incumbent
Co-Director of Marketing	Amy Liu	China	Incumbent
Co-Director of Marketing	Claire Feng	China	Incumbent
Secretary General	Ariel Cao	China	Left office on 10th, May, 2023
Secretary General	John Mao	China	Incumbent

=== 2022 ===
2022 Executive Group of the New Zealand Chinese Students' Association
Position	Name	Citizenship	Note
Co-President	Ferry Feng	China	Incumbent
Co-President	Estella Liu	China	Incumbent
Director of Finance	Belinda Pu	China	Incumbent
Director of Human Resources	Dairong Wu	China	Incumbent
Associate Director of Human Resources	Katherine Wu	China	Incumbent
Director of Information Technology	Kirsty Gong	New Zealand	Incumbent
Associate Director of Information Technology	Alex Liang	China	Incumbent
Director of Business Development	Ansen Liu	China	Incumbent
Co-Director of Business Development	Denis Xu	China	Incumbent
Co-Director of Business Development (Public Relations)	Ian Katherine Zhuang	Australia; Canada	Incumbent
Director of Operations	Alvin Kaisen Meng	New Zealand	Incumbent
Associate Director of Operations	Chao Zheng	China	Incumbent
Co-Director of Marketing	Cissy Xiang	China	Incumbent
Co-Director of Marketing	Sinry Yu	China	Incumbent
Secretary General	Ariel Cao	China	Incumbent

=== 2021 ===
2021 Executive Group of the New Zealand Chinese Students' Association
Position	Name	Citizenship	Note
President	Summer Xia	China	Incumbent
Director of Operations	Josephine Wang	China	Incumbent
Associate Director of Operations	Ferry Feng	China	Incumbent
Director of Business Development	Doris Qin	China	Incumbent
Associate Director of Business Development	Ansen Liu	China	Incumbent
Director of Human Resources	Annan Chen	China	Incumbent
Associate Director of Human Resources	Estella Liu	China	Incumbent
Director of IT	Melo Yiao Guan	China	Incumbent
Secretary General	James Geng	China	Incumbent
Director of Finance	Belinda Pu	China	Incumbent
Co-Director of Marketing	Chloe Ji	China	Incumbent
Co-Director of Marketing	Brandi Ruan	China	Incumbent

=== 2020 ===
2020 Executive Group of the New Zealand Chinese Students' Association
Position	Name	Citizenship	Note
President	Summer Xia	China	Incumbent
Vice President	Dorothy Feng	China	Incumbent
Director of Operations	Adam Tan	China	Incumbent
Co-Director of Business Development	Mac Sheng	China	Incumbent
Co-Director of Business Development	Fiona Zhao	China	Incumbent
Director of Human Resources	Annan Chen	China	Incumbent
Co-Director of IT	Christina Kexin Yuan	China	Incumbent
Co-Director of IT	Kai Chen	China	Incumbent
Secretary General	Cheryl Qinpeng Zeng	China	Incumbent
Director of Finance	Serena Wang	China	Incumbent
Director of Marketing	Jingqi Zhang	China	Incumbent

=== 2019 ===
2019 Executive Group of the New Zealand Chinese Students' Association
Position	Name	Citizenship	Note
President	Neyra Rong Nie	China	Incumbent
Vice President	Richard Ming Xuan Li	New Zealand	Incumbent
Treasurer	Jessica Peishan Zhao	China	Incumbent
Director of Business Development	Agnes Yajia Wu	China	Incumbent
Co-Director of Human Resources	Sandra Jiawei Huang	China	Incumbent
Co-Director of Human Resources	Summer Jing Xia	China	Incumbent
Director of IT	Christina Kexin Yuan	China	Incumbent
Director of Operations	Dorothy Ziqi Feng	China	Incumbent
Director of Marketing	Jingqi Zhang	China	Incumbent
Strategy Consultant	Richard Ming Xuan Li	New Zealand	Incumbent

=== 2018 ===
2018 Executive Group of the New Zealand Chinese Students' Association
Position	Name	Citizenship	Note
President	Heidi Zhengyi Zhou	China	Incumbent
Vice President	Cindy Xinyue Wang	China	Left office on 2018-07-16
Vice President	Anna Ruian Huang	China	Incumbent
Vice President	Sam Guanshan Xun	New Zealand	Left office on 2018-03-27
Treasurer	Joyee Jiayi Hu	China	Left office on 2018-07-16
Treasurer	Susan Xinyi Wu	China	Incumbent
Director of Business Development	Neyra Rong Nie	China	Incumbent
Director of Human Resources	Shirley Wanjing Yu	China	Incumbent
Director of IT	Sherry Shengjie Zhang	China	Incumbent
Director of Operations	Emma Yifan Zhao	China	Incumbent
Director of Marketing	Samuel Weiliang Su	China	Incumbent
Director of Alumni Relations	Huixi Yao	China	Left office on 2018-07-16

=== 2017 ===
2017 Executive Group of the New Zealand Chinese Students' Association
Position	Name	Citizenship	Note
President	Alice Muyun Xu	New Zealand	Incumbent
Vice President	Martin Tianli Ma	China	Incumbent
Vice President	Heidi Zhengyi Zhou	China	Incumbent
Strategy Consultant	Cindy Huiyu Huang	China	Incumbent
Secretary-General	Angela Zhiqing Zhang	China	Incumbent
Treasurer	Jacky Yuanjie Sui	China	Incumbent
Director of Business Development	Anna Ruian Huang	China	Incumbent
Director of Human Resources	Cindy Xinyue Wang	China	Incumbent
Director of IT	David Bojun Jin	China	Incumbent
Director of Marketing	Cathy ChunHua Chen	China	Incumbent
Director of Marketing	Lucy Xilu Wang	China	Left office on 2017-04-23
Director of Operations	Sam Guanshan Xun	New Zealand	Incumbent

=== 2016 ===
2016 Executive Group of the New Zealand Chinese Students' Association
Position	Name	Citizenship	Note
President	Naisi Chen	New Zealand	Incumbent
Vice President	Morris Ruoyu Miao	China	Incumbent
Vice President	Rosa Zhendong Guo	China	Incumbent
Vice President	Alice Muyun Xu	New Zealand	Incumbent, Acting
Strategy Consultant	Yvonne Mohan Li	China	Left office on 2016-03-25
Strategy Consultant	Keesh Nan Gong	China	Incumbent
Secretary-General	Joy Shuai Wang	China	Incumbent
Treasurer	Martin Tianli Ma	China	Incumbent
Director of Business Development	Serena Heming Zhao	China	Incumbent
Director of Human Resources	Cindy Huiyu Huang	China	Incumbent
Director of IT	Johnson Zhanpeng Zhou	China	Incumbent
Director of Marketing	Emma Yushi Cheng	China	Incumbent
Director of Operations	Heidi Zhengyi Zhou	China	Incumbent

=== 2015 ===
2015 Executive Group of the New Zealand Chinese Students' Association
Position	Name	Citizenship	Note
President	Bean Bin Wang	China	Incumbent
Vice President	Morris Ruoyu Miao	China	Incumbent
Vice President	Max Zhewei Gong	New Zealand	Incumbent
Secretary-General	Naisi Chen	New Zealand	Incumbent
Strategy Consultant	Louise Xiaojing Yi	China	Incumbent
Treasurer	Lucy Xi Lu	China	Incumbent
Director of Business Development	Keith Likun Zhao	China	Incumbent
Director of Human Resources	Iris Yuqing Zhang	China	Left office on 2015-07-28
Director of Human Resources*	Morris Ruoyu Miao	China	Incumbent, Acting
Director of IT	Morris Ruoyu Miao	China	Incumbent, Acting
Director of Marketing	Christine Shiting Huang	China	Incumbent
Director of Operations	Mandy Minting Huang	New Zealand	Left office on 2015-06-09
Director of Operations*	Rosa Zhendong Guo	China	Incumbent

=== 2014 ===
2014 Executive Group of the New Zealand Chinese Students' Association
Position	Name	Citizenship	Note
President	Eric Fei Wang	China	
Vice President	Bean Bin Wang	China	
Vice President	Catherine Kexin Ouyang	New Zealand	
Technical Director	Morris Ruoyu Miao	China	
Treasurer	Candy Zhiqi Deng	China	
Director of Business Development	Alice Yazhi Yang	China	
Director of Human Resources	Ling Zhilin Ju	New Zealand	
Director of Marketing	Christine Shiting Huang	China	
Director of Operations	Johnny Junyu Zhao	China	

== See also ==
- Chinese Students and Scholars Association
