= Murray McCully =

New Zealand politician

The Honourable Murray McCully CNZM CF
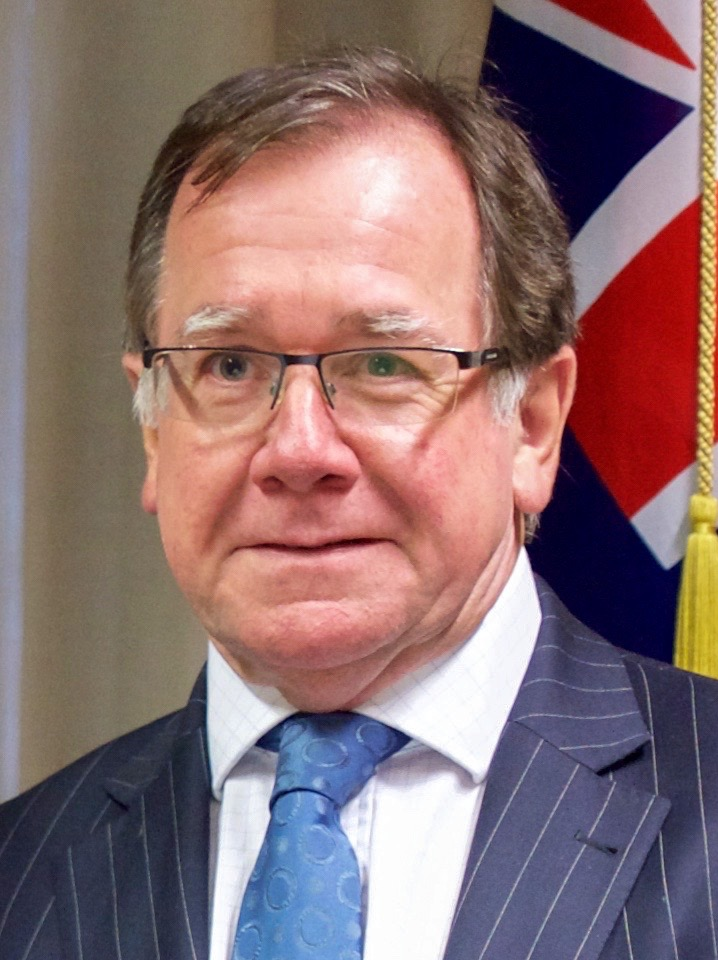
- McCully in 2016

26th Minister of Foreign Affairs
- In office 19 November 2008 – 2 May 2017
- Prime Minister: John Key; Bill English
- Preceded by: Winston Peters; Helen Clark (Acting)
- Succeeded by: Gerry Brownlee

2nd Minister for the Rugby World Cup
- In office 19 November 2008 – 12 December 2011
- Prime Minister: John Key
- Preceded by: Clayton Cosgrove
- Succeeded by: Post abolished

7th Minister for Sport and Recreation
- In office 19 November 2008 – 6 October 2014
- Prime Minister: John Key
- Preceded by: Clayton Cosgrove
- Succeeded by: Jonathan Coleman
- In office 16 December 1996 – 10 December 1999
- Prime Minister: Jim Bolger; Jenny Shipley
- Preceded by: John Banks
- Succeeded by: Trevor Mallard

18th Minister of Customs
- In office 3 October 1991 – 16 December 1996
- Prime Minister: Jim Bolger
- Preceded by: Wyatt Creech
- Succeeded by: Neil Kirton

Member of the New Zealand Parliament for East Coast Bays Albany (1996–2002)
- In office 15 August 1987 – 23 September 2017
- Preceded by: Gary Knapp
- Succeeded by: Erica Stanford

Personal details
- Born: Murray Stuart McCully; 19 February 1953 (age 73) Whangārei, New Zealand
- Party: National Party
- Occupation: Lawyer
- Website: mccully.co.nz

Murray Stuart McCully CNZM CF (born 19 February 1953) is a New Zealand former politician. He is a member of the National Party, and served as Minister of Foreign Affairs from 2008 to 2017.

== Early life ==
Born in Whangārei, McCully was educated at Arapohue Primary School, Dargaville High School, the University of Auckland, and Victoria University of Wellington. He has a Bachelor of Laws degree and is a qualified barrister and solicitor, working as a lawyer before entering politics. He had a long-term relationship with political journalist and columnist Jane Clifton, with whom he had two sons, which ended in the 2010s.

== Member of Parliament ==
New Zealand Parliament
Years	Term	Electorate	List	Party
1987–1990	42nd	East Coast Bays		National
1990–1993	43rd	East Coast Bays		National
1993–1996	44th	East Coast Bays		National
1996–1999	45th	Albany	21	National
1999–2002	46th	Albany	None	National
2002–2005	47th	East Coast Bays	None	National
2005–2008	48th	East Coast Bays	11	National
2008–2011	49th	East Coast Bays	11	National
2011–2014	50th	East Coast Bays	11	National
2014–2017	51st	East Coast Bays	11	National

McCully first stood for Parliament in 1975 in Auckland Central, reducing Richard Prebble's majority to 289. He next stood for East Coast Bays in 1984, coming second to Gary Knapp.

In 1987, McCully defeated Knapp and entered Parliament as MP for East Coast Bays on Auckland's North Shore. He held that seat at three general elections.

At the 1996 election he became MP for the new seat of Albany before returning, in the 2002 election, as MP for the reconstituted East Coast Bays seat. McCully retired from parliamentary politics in 2017.

Over his career, McCully held senior ministerial appointments in both the Fourth and Fifth National Governments. He had a reputation as a party strategist, "fix-it man" and "Machiavellian Dark Prince."

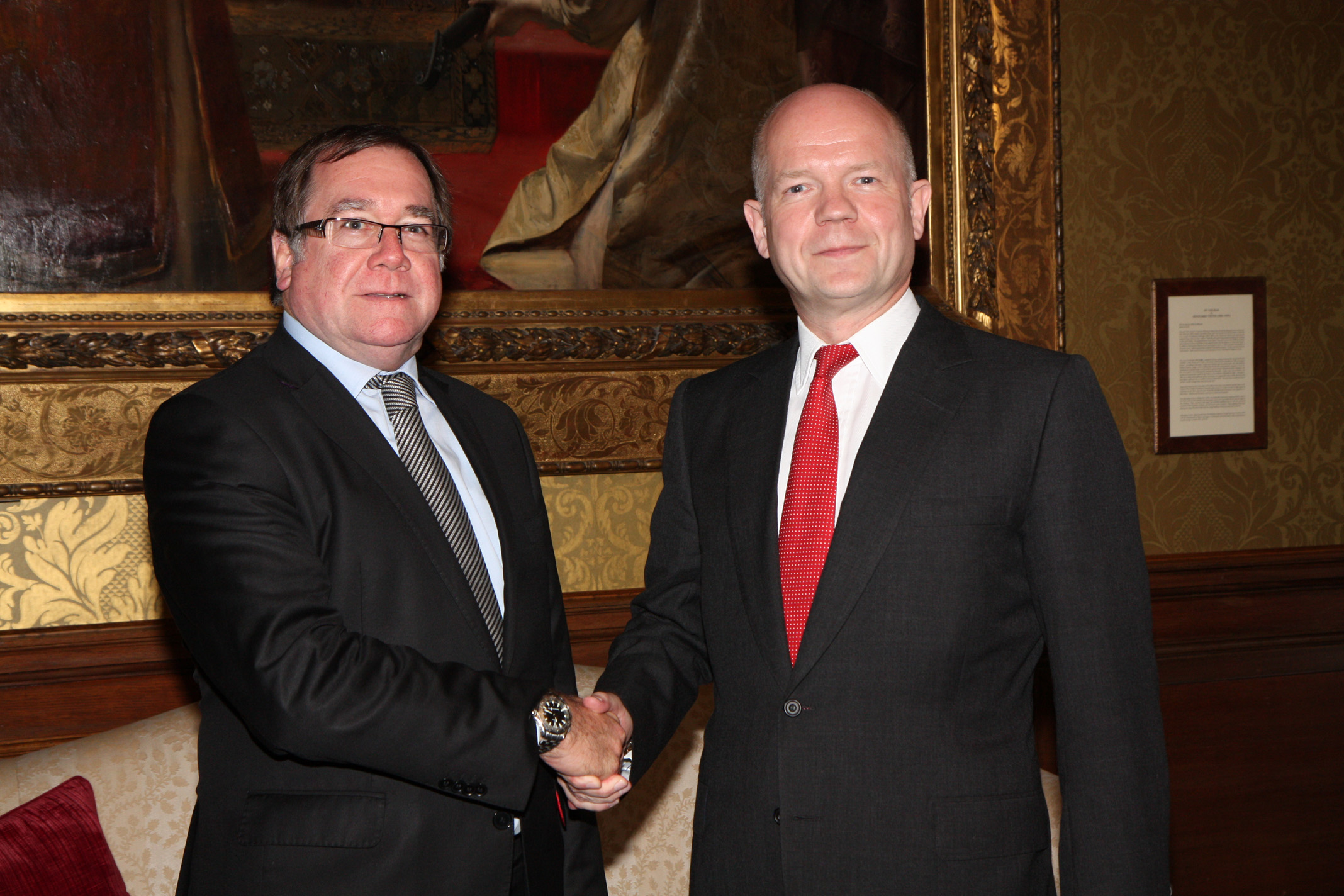
New Zealand Foreign Minister Murray McCully (left) meet with British Foreign Secretary William Hague (right) in London, England, on 6 August 2012.

=== Fourth National Government, 1990–1999 ===
McCully's first ministerial appointment was as Minister of Customs and Associate Minister of Tourism in 1991. He held later appointments under the premierships of Jim Bolger and Jenny Shipley as Minister of Housing, Minister of Immigration and Minister for Sport, Fitness and Leisure.

As Sport and Tourism Minister, McCully reportedly "headhunted" future Australian Prime Minister Scott Morrison to head up the new Office of Sport and Tourism.

Murray McCully resigned from his Tourism portfolio in April 1999 after questions were raised regarding his handling of the resignation and subsequent payout of members of the Tourism board. These questions culminated in a report of the Controller and Auditor General that deemed these payouts "unlawful," although the report accepted that all involved had proceeded on the basis of advice and "their genuine perception of what was in the best interests of New Zealand’s tourism industry."

=== Opposition, 1999–2008 ===
The National Party lost government at the 1999 general election and did not regain the treasury benches until 2008. During nine years of opposition, McCully held various opposition spokesperson roles including in the local government, housing, sport, state services, immigration, foreign affairs and defence portfolios.

McCully is understood to have been a key player in many of the leadership changes the National Party experienced while in opposition. McCully supported Bill English to replace Jenny Shipley as National Party leader in the 2001 New Zealand National Party leadership election, Don Brash to replace English in 2003, and Gerry Brownlee to replace Nick Smith as deputy leader in 2003. McCully was appointed "parliamentary assistant" to Brash and was reportedly the only MP Brash told about his decision to stand down in 2006.

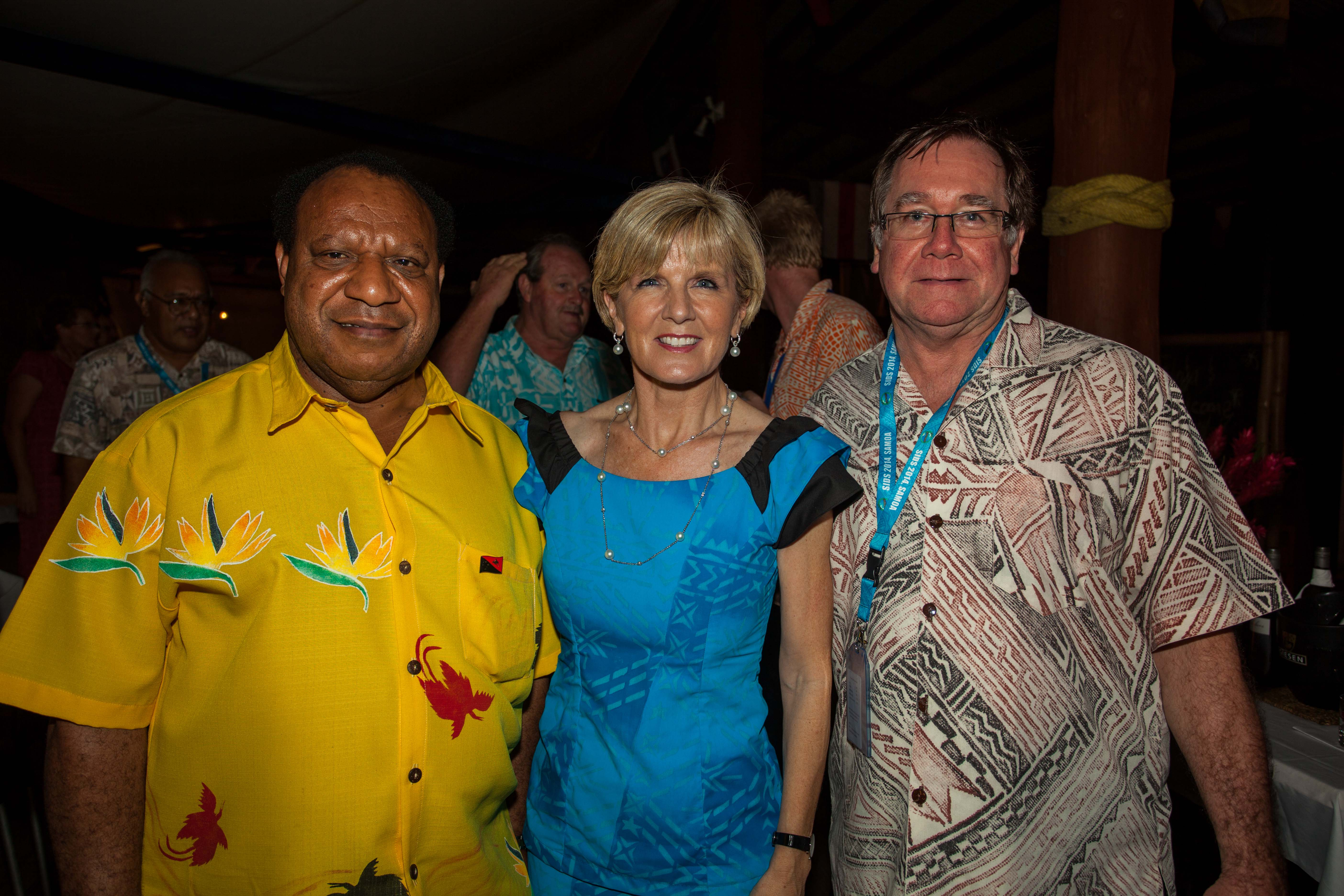
Papua New Guinean Foreign Minister Rimbink Pato (left), Australian Foreign Minister Julie Bishop (center) and New Zealand Foreign Minister Murray McCully (right) at SIDS, in August 2014.

=== Fifth National Government, 2008–2017 ===
After the National Party won the 2008 election, McCully was sworn in as a Cabinet Minister on 19 November 2008. McCully was appointed Minister of Foreign Affairs, Minister for Sport and Recreation, and Minister for the Rugby World Cup by New Zealand Prime Minister John Key.

In November 2015, McCully was off work after surgery for removal of a growth that was found to be benign.

On 15 December 2016, following the announcement that Key would retire from politics and the appointment of Bill English as Prime Minister, McCully announced that he would not stand for parliament in 2017 (in that year's general election). English and McCully had previously had a fractious relationship, relating to when McCully orchestrated the removal of English as party leader in 2003. Reflecting on his time as the Minister of Foreign Affairs, McCully said his most challenging and rewarding work was New Zealand's role in the Pacific: "I’ve put a lot of my personal effort into ensuring that we actually live up to the expectations our neighbours have of us and the responsibilities we should carry." He continued as Minister of Foreign Affairs under English until 2 May 2017, when he was succeeded by Gerry Brownlee.

In December 2016, McCully played a critical role in the United Nations Security Council Resolution 2334.

=== Political views ===
In 2004, McCully voted against a bill to establish civil unions. In 2005, he voted for the Marriage (Gender Clarification) Amendment Bill 2005, which would have amended the Marriage Act to define marriage as only between a man and a woman.

In 2013, McCully voted against the Marriage (Definition of Marriage) Amendment Bill, a bill allowing same-sex couples to marry in New Zealand.

== Awards and honours ==
While still a Member of Parliament, McCully was appointed a Companion of the New Zealand Order of Merit for services to foreign policy in the 2015 New Year Honours.

In 2019, McCully was appointed an Honorary Companion of the Order of Fiji, for services to relations between Fiji and New Zealand.

== See also ==
- List of foreign ministers in 2017
- Politics in New Zealand

New Zealand Parliament
Preceded by Gary Knapp	Member of Parliament for East Coast Bays; 1987–1996	Vacant Constituency abolished, recreated in 2002 Title next held by Murray McCully
Preceded by Don McKinnon	Member of Parliament for Albany; 1996–2002	Constituency abolished
Vacant Constituency recreated, abolished in 1996 Title last held by Murray McCully	Member of Parliament for East Coast Bays; 2002–2017	Succeeded by Erica Stanford
Political offices
Preceded by Helen Clark (acting); Winston Peters	Minister of Foreign Affairs; 2008–2017	Succeeded by Gerry Brownlee
Preceded by Clayton Cosgrove	Minister for the Rugby World Cup; 2008–2011	Portfolio abolished
Preceded by Clayton Cosgrove	Minister for Sport and Recreation; 2008-2014 1996–1999	Succeeded by Jonathan Coleman
Preceded by John Banks	Minister for Sport and Recreation; 2008-2014 1996–1999	Succeeded by Trevor Mallard
Preceded by Wyatt Creech	Minister of Customs; 1991–1996	Succeeded by Neil Kirton
