= Frank Gill (politician) =

New Zealand air force pilot and politician

The Honourable Frank Gill CBE, DSO
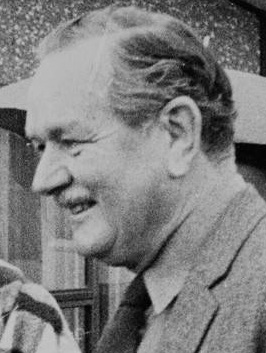
- Gill in 1975

New Zealand Ambassador to the United States
- In office 29 August 1980 – 1 March 1982
- Monarch: Elizabeth II
- Governor-General: Sir David Beattie
- Preceded by: Merwyn Norrish
- Succeeded by: Sir Lance Adams-Scheider

27th Minister of Defence
- In office 13 December 1978 – 21 August 1980
- Prime Minister: Robert Muldoon
- Preceded by: Allan McCready
- Succeeded by: David Thomson

23rd Minister of Police
- In office 13 December 1978 – 21 August 1980
- Prime Minister: Robert Muldoon
- Preceded by: Allan McCready
- Succeeded by: Ben Couch

24th Minister of Health
- In office 12 December 1975 – 13 December 1978
- Prime Minister: Robert Muldoon
- Preceded by: Tom McGuigan
- Succeeded by: George Gair

38th Minister of Immigration
- In office 12 December 1975 – 13 December 1978
- Prime Minister: Robert Muldoon
- Preceded by: Fraser Colman
- Succeeded by: Jim Bolger

Member of the New Zealand Parliament for East Coast Bays
- In office 25 November 1972 – 6 September 1980
- Succeeded by: Gary Knapp

Member of the New Zealand Parliament for Waitemata
- In office 29 November 1969 – 25 November 1972
- Preceded by: Norman King
- Succeeded by: Michael Bassett

Personal details
- Born: 31 January 1917 Wellington, New Zealand
- Died: 1 March 1982 (aged 65) Auckland, New Zealand
- Party: National
- Relations: Mark Mitchell (grandson)

Military service
- Allegiance: United Kingdom; New Zealand
- Branch/service: Royal Air Force; Royal New Zealand Air Force
- Years of service: 1937–1969
- Rank: Air Commodore
- Commands: Operations Group RNZAF; Deputy Chief of Air Staff
- Battles/wars: Second World War
- Awards: Commander of the Order of the British Empire; Distinguished Service Order

Air Commodore Thomas Francis Gill, CBE, DSO (31 January 1917 – 1 March 1982) was a New Zealand air force pilot and politician. He flew with the Royal Air Force throughout the Second World War and afterwards served with the Royal New Zealand Air Force until 1969. He entered Parliament as a National Party MP in 1969 and served as a cabinet minister from 1975 to 1980, when he resigned to become New Zealand's Ambassador to the United States.

== Early life ==
Born in Wellington on 31 January 1917 to Tom and Adelaide Gill (née Latto), Gill was educated at St. Patrick's College, Wellington. Gill was one of eight children.

== Air force career ==
Gill joined the Royal New Zealand Air Force (RNZAF) in 1937 and transferred to the Royal Air Force (RAF) in 1939. He flew Fairey Battle light bombers with No. 88 Squadron during the Battle of France, Hawker Hurricane fighters with No. 43 Squadron in the Battle of Britain, and later flew on night bombing raids. He was a flying officer with No. 75 Squadron on 23 September 1941 when he was awarded the Distinguished Service Order.

Gill attended RAF Staff College, Bulstrode Park and the Joint Services Staff College at Latimer House, and returned to the RNZAF following the war. In 1953, he was awarded the Queen Elizabeth II Coronation Medal. He served as New Zealand's armed forces attaché in Washington, D.C. from 1957 to 1959 and senior air staff officer of the Commonwealth air forces in Singapore from 1960 to 1962. Gill was appointed a Commander of the Order of the British Empire in the 1961 New Year Honours. He was Deputy Chief of Air Staff with the rank of air commodore from 1965, and served as Air Officer Commanding Operations Group RNZAF at Whenuapai from 1965 to 1969.

== Member of Parliament ==
New Zealand Parliament
Years	Term	Electorate	Party
1969–1972	36th	Waitemata	National
1972–1975	37th	East Coast Bays	National
1975–1978	38th	East Coast Bays	National
1978–1980	39th	East Coast Bays	National

Gill represented the Waitemata electorate in the New Zealand Parliament from 1969 to 1972, and then the East Coast Bays electorate from 1972 to 1980, when he resigned to take up the post of New Zealand Ambassador to the United States. In 1972, Gill supported Robert Muldoon's candidacy to succeed Keith Holyoake as the leader of the National Party, which was ultimately won by Jack Marshall. In 1974, Gill supported Muldoon's successful leadership challenge against Marshall. In an act of gratitude Muldoon promoted Gill to the front bench. Ranked 8th he was the highest placed MP who had not been a minister in the previous National government. Muldoon appointed Gill as Shadow Minister of Health, Social Welfare and Superannuation.

Gill was a cabinet minister, and held the positions of Minister of Health (1975–1978), Minister of Immigration (1975–1978), Minister of Defence (1978–21 August 1980) and Minister of Police (1978–1980) in the Third National Government.

Following the 1975 New Zealand general election, Gill was appointed Minister of Health, an appointment which he resented since he had wanted the position of Minister of Defence. According to the historian Barry Gustafson, Gill had a tense relationship with Prime Minister Muldoon, with the two disagreeing strongly on several occasions. As Health Minister, Gill disagreed with the Labour Party's support for a centralised health system and favoured the existing decentralised system of district health boards.

During his time as a government minister and Member of Parliament, Gill was known as a staunch anti-abortion opponent within the National Party. In 1977, Gill introduced the Contraception, Sterilisation, and Abortion Act 1977, which decriminalised abortion in New Zealand under a restrictive framework. The passage of the bill heightened tensions between anti and pro-abortion elements within the National Party caucus; Muldoon and Gill were part of the anti-abortion faction while George Gair and Marilyn Waring were part of the pro-abortion faction. Gill clashed with the pro-abortion George Gair, leaving their relationship "damaged irreparably." Due to his anti-abortion position, Gill's candidacy for the East Coast Bays electorate was challenged by pro-abortion National Party supporters, who unsuccessfully fielded a National Alternative candidate. This conflict destabilised the National Party's organisation and vote in East Coast Bays, contributing to the Social Credit Party taking the electorate in a snap election in 1982.

As Minister of Immigration, Gill supported the Government's dawn raids against overstayers, which disproportionately targeted the Pasifika community. In response the Polynesian Panthers activist group staged "counter raids" on the homes of Gill and fellow National MP and minister Bill Birch, surrounding them with light and chanting with megaphones.

On 25 August 1980, Gill was granted the right to retain the title The Honourable on his retirement as a member of the Executive Council of New Zealand.

== Ambassador to Washington and death ==
Gill was New Zealand's Ambassador to the United States from 1981 until his death. Muldoon's decision to appoint Gill as Ambassador was opposed by the Minister of Foreign Affairs Brian Talboys.

While serving as Ambassador to the United States, Gill was hospitalised at Georgetown University Hospital on 16 February 1982 and returned to New Zealand on a stretcher shortly before his death in Auckland on 1 March 1982. His ashes were buried in the Royal New Zealand Returned and Services' Association section at North Shore Memorial Park.

Gill's grandson, Mark Mitchell, was elected to parliament in 2011.

== Notes ==
New Zealand Parliament
Preceded by Norman King	Member of Parliament for Waitemata; 1969–1972	Succeeded by Michael Bassett
New constituency	Member of Parliament for East Coast Bays; 1972–1980	Succeeded by Gary Knapp
Political offices
Preceded by Tom McGuigan	Minister of Health; 1975–1978	Succeeded by George Gair
Preceded by Fraser Colman	Minister of Immigration; 1975–1978	Succeeded by Jim Bolger
Preceded by Allan McCready	Minister of Defence; 1978–1980	Succeeded by David Thomson
Preceded by Allan McCready	Minister of Police; 1978–1980	Succeeded by Ben Couch
Diplomatic posts
Preceded by Merwyn Norrish	Ambassador to the United States; 1980–1982	Succeeded by Lance Adams-Schneider
