= Don Brash =

New Zealand politician (born 1940)

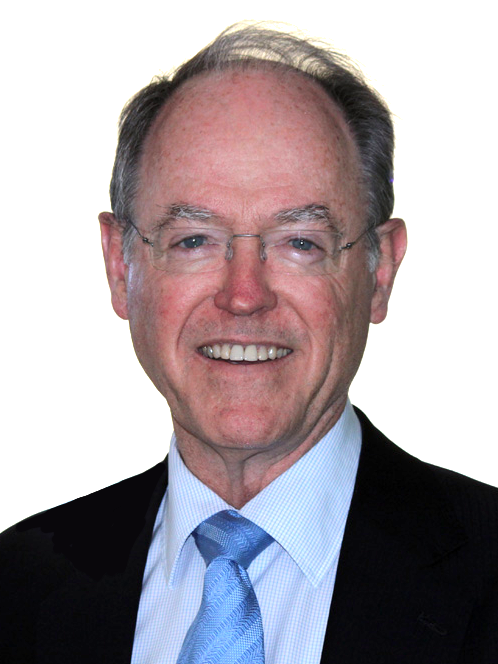
- Don Brash in 2011

4th Leader of ACT New Zealand
- In office 28 April 2011 – 26 November 2011
- Preceded by: Rodney Hide
- Succeeded by: John Banks

30th Leader of the Opposition
- In office 28 October 2003 – 27 November 2006
- Prime Minister: Helen Clark
- Deputy: Nick Smith; Gerry Brownlee
- Preceded by: Bill English
- Succeeded by: John Key

10th Leader of the National Party
- In office 28 October 2003 – 27 November 2006
- Deputy: Nick Smith; Gerry Brownlee
- Preceded by: Bill English
- Succeeded by: John Key

Member of the New Zealand Parliament for National Party list
- In office 27 July 2002 – 6 February 2007
- Succeeded by: Katrina Shanks (Note: Normally, list MPs do not have individual predecessors or successors, but Brash resigned during a sitting parliament and therefore was succeeded by Shanks.)

9th Governor of the Reserve Bank of New Zealand
- In office 1 September 1988 – 26 April 2002
- Preceded by: Sir Spencer Russell
- Succeeded by: Alan Bollard

Personal details
- Born: 24 September 1940 (age 86) Whanganui, New Zealand
- Party: ACT (2011–)
- Other political affiliations: National (1980–2011)
- Spouse(s): Erica Brash (1964–1985); Je Lan Lee (1985–2007)
- Relations: Thomas Brash (grandfather); Alan Brash (father)
- Children: 3
- Education: Australian National University (PhD) and University of Canterbury (Masters and Bachelors)
- Profession: Former Governor of the Reserve Bank of New Zealand

Donald Thomas Brash (born 24 September 1940) is a New Zealand former politician who was Leader of the Opposition and leader of the New Zealand National Party from October 2003 to November 2006, and leader of the ACT New Zealand party for seven months from April to November 2011.

Brash was Governor of the Reserve Bank of New Zealand for fourteen years from 1988 to April 2002. He resigned to stand as a list MP for the National Party in the 2002 general election. Brash was ranked high on the party list and so was elected, despite the Bill English-led National Party being heavily defeated. Brash challenged English's leadership position the next year, and was elected head of the party on 28 October 2003. He delivered a speech at Orewa on 27 January 2004 that proved controversial, expressing opposition to perceived Māori separatism, through New Zealand's measures designed to benefit them.

In the 2005 general election, the National Party made major gains under Brash's leadership and achieved its best result (at that time) since the introduction of the mixed-member proportional electoral system in 1996 – recovering from its worst ever result in 2002. However, National won two seats fewer than the incumbent New Zealand Labour Party, and was unable to secure a majority from the minor parties to form a government. Brash resigned as party leader on 27 November 2006, and retired from Parliament in February 2007.

In October 2008, he was appointed as an adjunct professor of banking in the Business School at the Auckland University of Technology, and an adjunct professor in the School of Economics and Finance at La Trobe University in Melbourne, Australia.

On 28 April 2011, Brash joined the ACT party as its leader, replacing Rodney Hide. He resigned as leader on the night of the 2011 general election in November due to ACT's poor showing in the election, and its failure to gain any seats apart from its electorate strong-hold of Epsom. In 2016, he founded the lobby group Hobson's Pledge.

== Childhood, education and marriage ==
Don Brash was born to Alan Brash, a Presbyterian minister and son of prominent lay leader Thomas Brash, and Eljean Brash (née Hill), in Whanganui on 24 September 1940.

His family moved to Christchurch when he was six. He attended Cashmere Primary School and Christchurch Boys' High School before going to the University of Canterbury where he graduated in economics, history and political science. He continued his studies in economics, receiving his master's degree in 1962 for a thesis arguing that foreign investment damaged a country's economic development. The following year he began working towards a PhD (again in economics), at the Australian National University. In 1964 Brash married Erica, with whom he had two children. In the 1980s he and his Singaporean secretary, Je Lan Lee, who was also married, began a relationship. He separated from Erica in 1985 and four months after they were later divorced, he married Lee. In 2007, his marriage to Lee also broke up, following an affair with Diane Foreman, then Deputy Chair of the Business Round Table. Brash and Lee had one child together.

== Early career ==
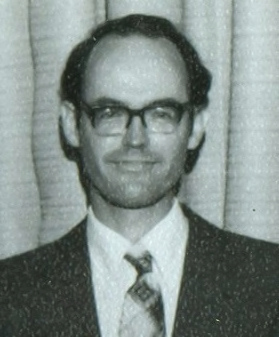
Brash in 1977

Brash went to Washington, D.C. in the United States in 1966 to work as an economist for the World Bank. He returned to New Zealand in 1971 to become general manager of Broadbank Corporation, a merchant bank.

His first entry into politics came in 1980 when the National Party selected him to stand as its candidate in the by-election in the East Coast Bays electorate. Brash's attempt at the seat failed – some believe that this resulted from the decision by Robert Muldoon, National Party Prime Minister, to raise tolls on the Auckland Harbour Bridge, an important route for East Coast Bays residents. The seat went to Gary Knapp of the Social Credit Party. Brash again failed to win the seat at the 1981 general election.

In 1981, he hosted Milton Friedman while National Party candidate, prior to the neoliberal reforms enacted by Roger Douglas, whom he later nominated as the greatest living New Zealander In 1982 Brash became managing director at the New Zealand Kiwifruit Authority, which oversaw the export of kiwifruit (he still grows kiwifruit as a hobby). From 1986 to 1988, he served as the general manager of Trust Bank, a merger of nine trustee savings banks.

== Reserve Bank governor ==
In 1988 Brash became governor of the Reserve Bank of New Zealand, a position which he held for the next 14 years. Brash consistently met Government-set targets to keep inflation within initially 0 to 2%, later 1 to 3% during his time as governor.

There is a range of opinion on Brash's performance as Reserve Bank governor. The New Zealand Association of Economists describe Brash's success in establishing an independent central bank with an inflation target and in reducing inflation as a highlight of his career. Documentary maker Alister Barry described Brash as "an extremist, an idealist" whose "ideal world is where the free market reigns supreme". Barry considered that Brash manipulated public opinion towards neo-liberal economics and gave as examples Brash's advocacy for abolishing the minimum wage and his Hayek Memorial Lecture to the Institute of Economic Affairs in London in 1996.

In 1990, Brash was awarded the New Zealand 1990 Commemoration Medal. In 2002, he was inducted into the New Zealand Business Hall of Fame, in recognition of his role as central bank governor.

== Member of Parliament ==
New Zealand Parliament
Years	Term	Electorate	List	Party
2002–2005	47th	List	5	National
2005–2007	48th	List	1	National

On 26 April 2002, shortly before the 2002 general election, Brash resigned as Reserve Bank governor to stand for parliament as a candidate for the National party. He was placed on its party list and as such obtained a parliamentary seat. Brash immediately joined National's front bench as its spokesman on finance.

In October 2003, Brash publicly challenged Bill English for the position of Parliamentary Leader of the National Party. English had gradually lost support within the party, but Brash's victory in any leadership-contest against English seemed by no means guaranteed. Brash's decision to make his challenge public caused some criticism, with some party supporters perceiving that an open leadership dispute could damage the party's image. However, by breaking with the tradition of operating secretly, Brash calculated that people would see him as an honest "anti-politician" – a notion central to his personal brand. After leading National to its worst-ever election result in 2002, English was sacked the following year in favour of Don Brash.

== Leader of the Opposition ==
Brash won a caucus vote on 28 October 2003, making him Leader of the National Party Caucus (and thus Leader of the Opposition) after one year as a Member of Parliament. He remained National's finance spokesman, appointing the equally new MP John Key as his deputy finance-spokesman, and eventually appointing Key the primary finance-spokesman after a Caucus reshuffle in August 2004.

=== Orewa speech ===
On 27 January 2004, Brash delivered his second Orewa speech on "Nationhood" at the Orewa Rotary Club. He said:

The topic I will focus on today is the dangerous drift towards racial separatism in New Zealand, and the development of the now entrenched Treaty grievance industry. We are one country with many peoples, not simply a society of Pākehā and Māori where the minority has a birthright to the upper hand, as the Labour Government seems to believe".[...]

Shortly after the delivery of the Orewa speech, his Māori Affairs spokesperson Georgina te Heuheu resigned. National gained 17 percentage points in the February 2004 Colmar Brunton poll for Television New Zealand, taken shortly after the speech. After the February peak, National suffered a steady decline in public opinion polls, leaving it 11 points behind Labour at the end of 2004.

On 25 January 2005 Brash made his third speech to the Orewa Rotary Club (his first had come in the final week of January 2003, while still National's finance spokesman). This time Brash focused on "Welfare Dependency: Whatever Happened to Personal Responsibility?" He said:

How can we tolerate a welfare system which allows children to grow up in a household where the parents are permanently dependent on a welfare benefit? Our welfare system is contributing to the creation of a generation of children condemned to a lifetime of deprivation, with limited education, without life skills, and without the most precious inheritance from their parents, a sense of ambition or aspiration. Nothing can be more destructive of self esteem.

=== Views on race relations ===
After the Orewa speech of 2004, Brash's public statements on race relations received significant attention, both in the traditional media and online. During the 2005 election campaign, he criticised the use of pōwhiri in welcoming international visitors:

I mean, I think there is a place for Maori culture but why is it that we always use a semi-naked male, sometimes quite pale-skinned Māori, leaping around in, you know, mock battle?

In September 2006 Brash said:

There are clearly many New Zealanders who do see themselves as distinctly and distinctively Māori – but it is also clear there are few, if any, fully Māori left here. There has been a lot of intermarriage and that has been welcome.

These comments received a negative response from other political leaders, who portrayed focusing on blood quantum as divisive and as harking back to racist laws, and who suggested the appropriateness for Māori themselves to determine how to define themselves.

Brash questioned whether Māori remained a distinct indigenous group because few "full-blooded" individuals survive. This drew criticism from a range of his adversaries, including Māori Party co-leader Tariana Turia, who cancelled a dinner with him in protest. In a statement to explain his position on 30 September 2006, Brash said that the Government had no responsibility to address the over-representation of Māori in negative social statistics. "If Māori New Zealanders die more frequently from lung cancer than non-Māori do, for example, it is almost certainly because Māori New Zealanders choose to smoke more heavily than other New Zealanders do".

Brash stressed the significance of New Zealand's British heritage. When asked "who are the ideal immigrants?", Brash said;

British immigrants fit in here very well. My own ancestry is all British. New Zealand values are British values, derived from centuries of struggle since Magna Carta. Those things make New Zealand the society it is.

== 2005 general election ==
There was a general election on 17 September 2005. In his first party-political election-campaign broadcast Brash mentioned a number of aspects of his life that he believed had attuned him to the political centre-ground in New Zealand:

- registering as a conscientious objector at age 18
- serving as the patron of Amnesty International Freedom Foundation
- participating in demonstrations against the racially selected South African rugby team touring New Zealand (1981) and the New Zealand All-Blacks rugby team touring South Africa without Māori team members
- his frugal approach, most famously washing his own laundry in his hotel-room basin while on taxpayer-funded overseas trips as Governor of the Reserve Bank
- voting for Labour in his early years

On 19 August 2005, National unveiled a $3.9 billion tax-cut policy. The first polling conducted after the announcement suggested that it had boosted National support. On 22 August, Brash engaged in a televised debate with the Labour Party leader Helen Clark. According to The New Zealand Herald, Clark appeared 'confident and aggressive' and Brash appeared 'defensive'. In response to questions over his assertiveness, Brash indicated that he had not attacked Clark during the debate because she was a woman. Clark described Brash's explanation as patronising.

On 27 August a weekend newspaper published a series of leaked documents, including private emails, showing that members of the ACT party and of the Business Round Table had advised Brash during his bid for the leadership of the parliamentary National Party. Continuing leaks over following weeks appeared designed to cause the National leader embarrassment. Furthermore, confusion bedevilled National's potential coalition options: New Zealand First showed reluctance to reveal whether it would support National or Labour post-election, whilst ACT (often seen as National's natural coalition partner due to the similarities in some of their policies) criticised National for not openly supporting ACT leader Rodney Hide's bid to win the electorate seat of Epsom.

Pamphlets distributed by members of a Christian sect, the Plymouth Brethren Christian Church (formerly known as the Exclusive Brethren) in early September caused further embarrassment for Brash; although they were not anonymous, they did not refer to the Exclusive Brethren but were authorised in the names of individual church members. Brash initially denied National had anything to do with it, but later admitted that the Brethren had told him at a meeting some months earlier that they planned to run a campaign opposing the direction of the Labour Government. Brash has maintained his position that the pamphlet campaign took place on the Exclusive Brethren's own initiative.

The election produced a close result, with initial election-night figures from rural areas favouring National (in accordance with previous patterns), but by the end of the evening Labour had won 40.7% of the vote to National's 39.6%. Following the counting of the special votes the gap widened, with Labour taking 41.1% of the vote to National's 39.1%. Brash conceded defeat on 1 October after weeks of electoral uncertainty while the major parties sought to secure the support of minor coalition partners. His only realistic scenario for becoming prime minister would have involved a coalition between National, ACT and United Future, with confidence and supply from New Zealand First and the Māori Party. This appeared highly unlikely on several counts. New Zealand First's involvement in such a coalition would have run counter to its pre-election promise to deal with the biggest party. Brash's promise to abolish Māori electorates alienated the Māori Party.

Essentially National had failed to make up enough ground in the cities but swept the electoral votes in the provinces, clawing back a number of seats from Labour and defeating New Zealand First founder-leader Winston Peters in his electorate (Peters remained in Parliament as a list MP). Apart from in Auckland, National's support centred mainly in rural and provincial areas.

== 2006–2011 ==
Brash took leave on 13 September 2006, to sort out marital troubles. Rumours of an extramarital affair came to the public's attention around this date. The party caucus then preferred Finance Spokesman, John Key, to be party leader as allegations appeared about Brash having an affair with an Auckland businesswoman, Diane Foreman.

=== Resignation ===
During a hastily called press conference on 23 November 2006, Brash announced his resignation as National Party leader, effective from 27 November. Speculation regarding his leadership had foreshadowed the move, and the publicity had had a negative effect on the party. The publicity came to a head just before the scheduled publication of a book by Nicky Hager containing leaked emails (amongst other allegedly damaging revelations).

On 16 November 2006 Brash had obtained a High Court injunction prohibiting the distribution or publication of the private emails allegedly unlawfully taken from his computer, following ongoing rumours that his opponents would publish a series of his personal emails as a book, and he confirmed that the police had commenced a criminal investigation into the alleged email theft. However, he claimed he had no awareness of and did not wish to stop the publication of the Hager book. As part of his resignation announcement, Brash announced he had cleared the way for the book's release by providing lifting the injunction, and stated it had nothing to with his resignation.

Brash also claimed that the publication of the book did not contribute to his decision to resign as National Party leader. The book, The Hollow Men: A Study in the Politics of Deception, details Brash's rise to power in the National Party as assisted by an "informal network of people from the right of New Zealand politics", including a number of ACT members. It also documents that senior National Party figures, including Brash, knew of the Exclusive Brethren's pamphlet campaigns in May 2005, although Brash denied knowledge of this until August.

On 30 November 2006, one week after resigning as leader of the party, Brash resigned from Parliament after the National Party's new parliamentary leader, John Key, declined to offer him a senior portfolio. He set no official date, but he stated he would not return in the new year. Brash made his valedictory speech on 12 December 2006. On 7 February 2007, Katrina Shanks took his place as a National Party list MP.

=== Career after national politics ===
On 18 May 2007, Brash joined the ANZ National Bank board as Rob McLeod retired from the board to return to his accounting practice. He became chairman of Huljich Wealth Management, an independent, specialist funds-management company based in Auckland, New Zealand. In late 2008 he was lecturing in economics at the Auckland University of Technology In April 2009 Brash was appointed as a director of the electricity grid operator Transpower.

In late April 2011, Brash, still a National Party member, announced that he would like to lead the ACT Party, which would require incumbent leader Rodney Hide to step down. Hide dismissed any talk of a leadership challenge to him but Brash was quoted as saying, "I'd like to say to the board that, under my leadership, I believe Act has a much better prospect of not only getting back into Parliament but having a significant number of MPs." John Key also would not rule out working with Brash if it came down to a tight decision.

Brash chairs the New Zealand subsidiary of the state-owned Industrial and Commercial Bank of China.

=== Leadership of the ACT Party ===
On 28 April 2011, Rodney Hide stood down as leader of the ACT Party in favour of Brash, who had joined the party that day. His membership was ratified by the party board on 30 April and the ACT parliamentary caucus confirmed him as leader the same day. The party board re-convened later that day to ratify his leadership. Rodney Hide remained in Parliament until its dissolution prior to the 2011 general election. Brash was leader of the party outside Parliament and former Auckland City mayor John Banks stood in the Epsom electorate. The Listener compared his successful leadership bid to a hostile takeover. Brash hoped to get ACT 15% of the party vote in the 2011 election, but it only managed 1%. Brash resigned on election night and was later replaced as leader by Banks. Brash's 213-day tenure as ACT leader was the shortest of any major party leader in modern New Zealand politics until 2020, when National Party leader Todd Muller resigned after 53 days.

== Post-2011 ==
In September 2016, Brash became the spokesperson for the new lobby group Hobson's Pledge. The group is named after William Hobson, the first Governor of New Zealand and co-author of the Treaty of Waitangi. The first of its many stated beliefs is: "All New Zealanders should be equal before the law, irrespective of when they or their ancestors arrived in New Zealand". Another is: "The Treaty of Waitangi did not create a "partnership" between Maori and the Crown". The group was formed to oppose what Brash has described as Māori favouritism and advocates abolishing the Māori electorates. Hobson's Pledge has been recognised for misleading marketing campaigns.

On 7 August 2018, Massey University Vice-Chancellor Jan Thomas cancelled Brash's talk scheduled for the next day at the university's Palmerston North campus. She cited safety issues regarding Brash's support for the alt-right Canadian activists Lauren Southern and Stefan Molyneux's Auckland tour and his leadership of the Hobson's Pledge advocacy group, which has advocated the abolition of the Māori wards. She said too she "supported free speech on campus, but totally opposed hate speech". Brash criticised her decision as a threat to free speech. The cancellation was criticised by various public figures, including Prime Minister Jacinda Ardern, Education Minister Chris Hipkins, Opposition Leader Simon Bridges, Massey University Students' Association President Ben Schmidt, and ACT party leader David Seymour. Several Māori members of Parliament, including Green Party co-leader Marama Davidson and Labour MP Willie Jackson, defended Brash's right to free speech, while disagreeing with his views of Māori. Brash later received a second invitation and delivered a speech on the campus on 17 October 2018, which was reportedly attended by less than 100 students.

During the COVID-19 pandemic in New Zealand, Brash joined several businessmen and former politicians, including former National MP Ross Meurant, in establishing the Covax-NZR company to import Russia's untested Gam-COVID-Vac (also known as Sputnik V) vaccine into New Zealand. By late August 2020, they had submitted paperwork through the Russian Embassy to establish supply and distribution arrangements to import the vaccine, however no further progress has been made since.

In February 2026, Brash said that he was supportive of the Government's decision to review the Reserve Bank of New Zealand's decisions during the pandemic.

During campaigning for the 2026 general election, Brash wrote a newspaper advertisement that called on National Party voters to give only their electorate vote to National, and to give their party vote to the ACT or New Zealand First parties, with the hope of creating an overhang, and increasing the possibility of electing a right-leaning government. The advertisement was placed in The New Zealand Herald by Reality Check Radio. National Party leader Christopher Luxon said the vote-splitting idea was "insanely stupid".

== Political positions ==
Brash voted for the decriminalisation of both prostitution and euthanasia, voted against raising the drinking age back up to 20 and voted against Manukau banning street prostitution. Brash voted against the Civil Unions Bill because he backed a public mandate for any change to the law. He has also called for the decriminalisation of cannabis.

In March 2013, Brash joined the debate over the future of Auckland, saying land needed to be freed up for residential zoning so house prices would come down, at odds with Mayor Len Brown's plan to stop urban sprawl and build the city upwards.

In mid July 2024, Brash joined former prime minister Helen Clark in criticising the Sixth National Government's perceived pro-US shift in New Zealand foreign policy. Prime Minister Christopher Luxon had recently said that the Government would be more willing to disclose cases of Chinese espionage in New Zealand and participating in AUKUS Pillar 2.

== Legal issues and litigation ==
In late September 2024, Brash through his legal counsel Stephen Franks sent legal letters against the lobbyist and the host of The Working Group podcast, Martyn Bradbury, and former National Party staffer Matthew Hooton. During a podcast in late September, and referencing Brash's 2004 Orewa speech, Hooton had made remarks attacking Brash's character and questioning the sincerity of his motives, as well as accusing him of promoting anti-Māori sentiment during his parliamentary career and as leader of Hobson's Pledge. In response, Bradbury issued a statement stating that Hooton apologised for his remarks. Brash subsequently sued Hooton for defamation. After unsuccessfully attempting to get Brash's lawsuit against him dismissed by the High Court, Hooton challenged Brash's lawsuit and the High Court's ruling at the Court of Appeal in late June 2026.

== Private life ==
Since 2016, Brash's partner has been Margaret Murray-Benge. As Margaret Murray, she was a councillor for Waimairi District (1977–1989), Christchurch City (1992–1998), Since 2004, she has been a councillor for Western Bay of Plenty District.

== Bibliography ==
- "New Zealand's Debt Servicing Capacity", University of Canterbury Press, 1964.
- "American Investment in Australian Industry", Harvard University Press, 1966.
- Incredible Luck. Troika Books. 2014. ISBN 978-0-473-26907-4

== Notes ==
Political offices
Preceded by Bill English	Leader of the Opposition; 2003–2006	Succeeded by John Key
Preceded by Sir Spencer Russell	Reserve Bank governor 1988–2002	Succeeded by Alan Bollard
Party political offices
Preceded by Bill English	Leader of the New Zealand National Party; 2003–2006	Succeeded by John Key
Preceded by Rodney Hide	Leader of the ACT Party; 2011	Succeeded by John Banks
