= East Coast Bays =

Area of the North Shore, Auckland, New Zealand

- Suburban Area
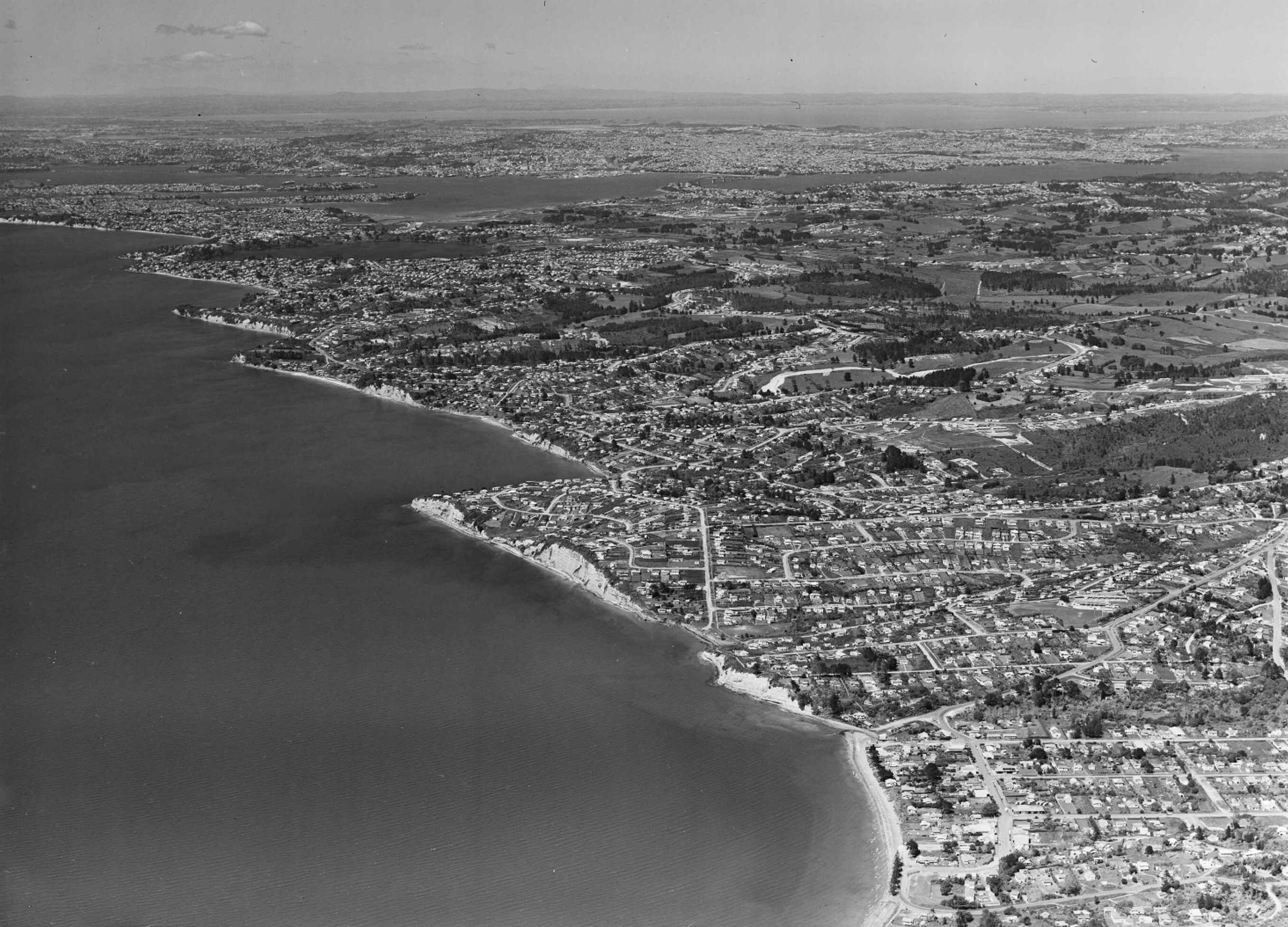
- View of the East Coast Bays south from Browns Bay in 1959
- Interactive map of East Coast Bays
- Coordinates: 36°43′52″S 174°44′38″E
- Country: New Zealand
- Island: North Island
- Region: Auckland Region
- Territorial Authority: Auckland Council
- Electoral ward: Albany Ward
- Local board: Hibiscus and Bays
- Electorate: East Coast Bays; Te Tai Tokerau

Government
  - Mayor of Auckland: Wayne Brown
  - East Coast Bays MP: Erica Stanford
  - Te Tai Tokerau MP: TBD
- Time zone: UTC+12 (NZST)
  - Summer (DST): UTC+13 (NZDT)

East Coast Bays is an urban area along the east coast of the North Shore in New Zealand. First established as independent borough during the 1950s, East Coast Bays became contiguous with the Auckland urban area and was amalgamated into North Shore City and later into Auckland Council. East Coast Bays lines the north-east coast of the city along the shore of the Hauraki Gulf and Rangitoto Channel. They include, from north to south, Long Bay, Torbay, Waiake Bay, Browns Bay, Rothesay Bay, Murrays Bay, Mairangi Bay, Campbells Bay and Castor Bay. Most of the East Coast Bays are covered under the East Coast Bays subdivision of the Hibiscus and Bays local board area.

== Definition and etymology ==
The East Coast Bays is a stretch of coastline in the North Shore of Auckland along the Hauraki Gulf, from Long Bay in the north to Castor Bay in the south. Milford and Takapuna to the south are occasionally included in the definition. The first uses of East Coast Bays from the 1870s referred to the eastern coast of the North Island. The first references to East Coast Bays as an area of the North Shore come from the latter 1920s.

== Geography ==
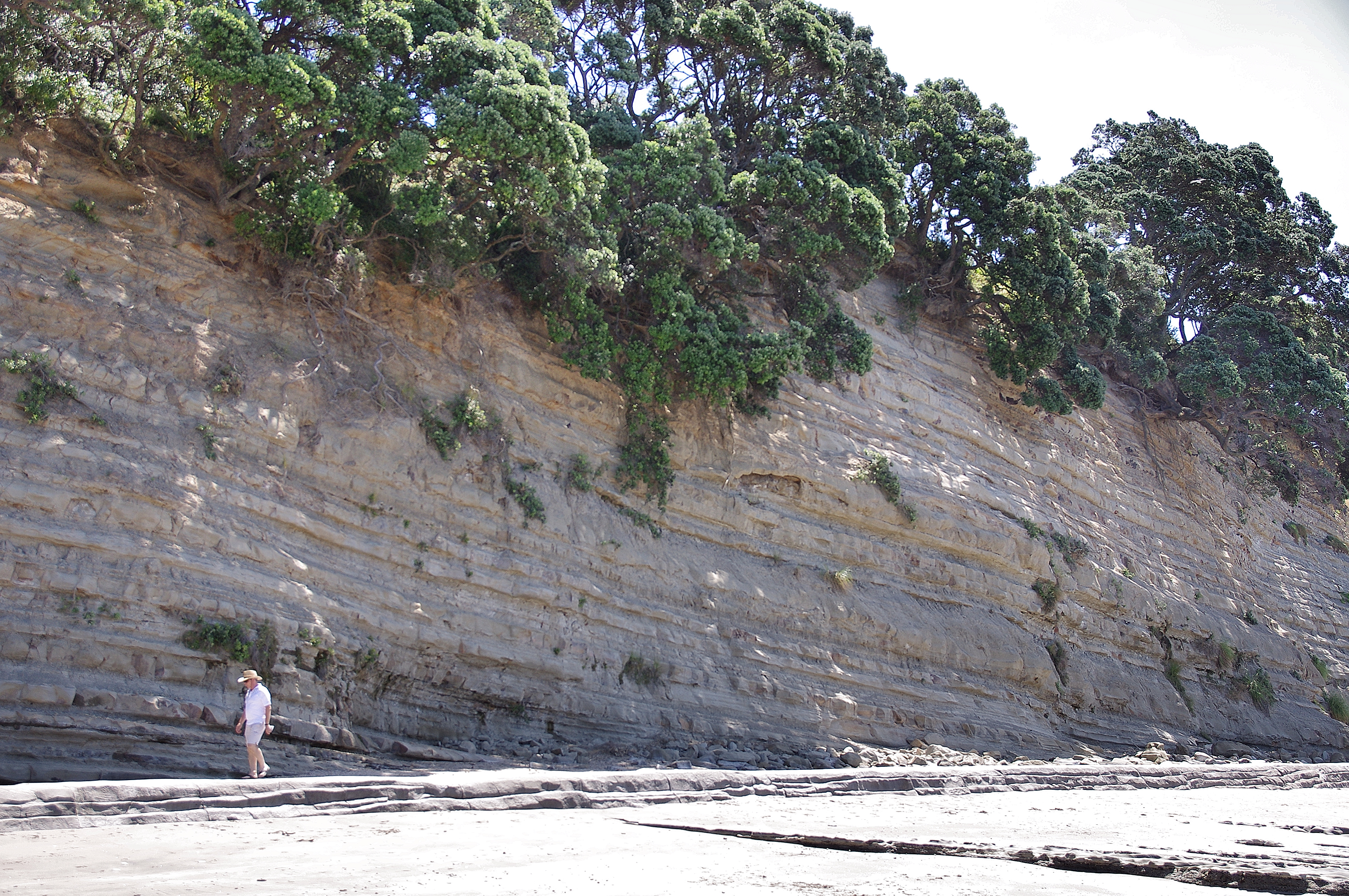
Eroding Waitemata Group sandstone cliffs at Campbells Bay

The East Coast Bays area begins at the Ōkura River and Karepiro Bay in the north, starting from Long Bay Regional Park. In the south, the mouth of the Wairau Creek forms the border between Castor Bay and Milford.

The East Coast Bays are primarily formed from Waitemata Group sandstone, which accumulated on the sea floor during the early Miocene era, between 22 and 16 million years ago, and uplifted due to tectonic forces. The sedimentary layers of the Waitemata sandstone can be clearly seen in the cliff faces along the bays. Basement rocks in the area are greywacke and argillite, and a number of the headlands of the East Coast Bays are formed from harder Parnell grit rocks, produced by lahars during the Miocene.

Prior to human settlement, the inland East Coast Bays area was primarily a northern broadleaf podocarp forest, dominated by kauri, tōtara, mataī, miro, kauri and kahikatea trees. Pōhutukawa trees were a major feature of the coastline. By the 19th century, the area was primarily scrubland, vegetated by plants such as mānuka, tutu and harakeke flax. An area of Torbay, the Awaruku Bush Reserve, is a remnant kahikatea forest, with the oldest trees in the reserve estimated to be over 650 years old.

== History ==
=== Māori history ===
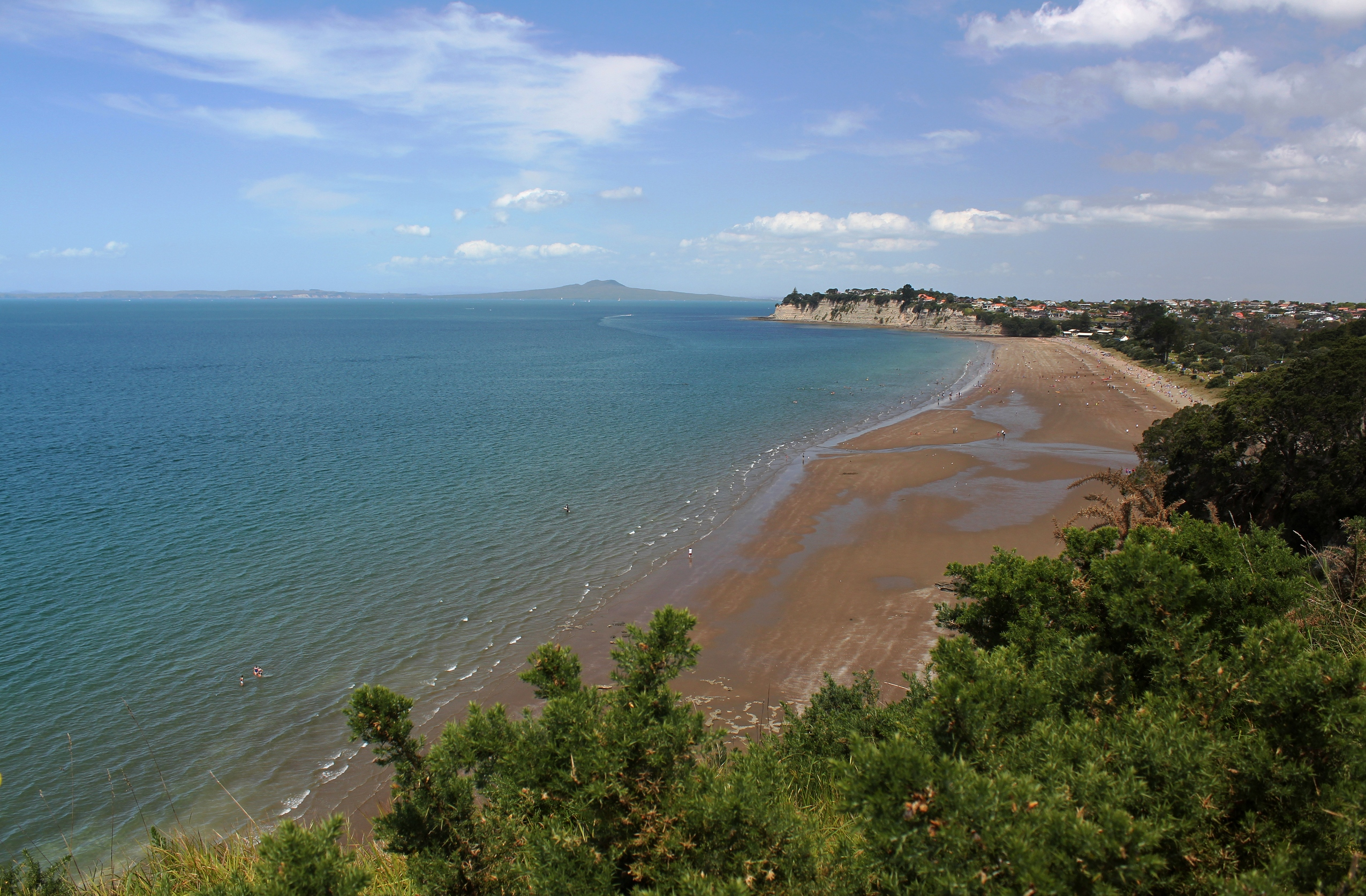
Until the 1850s, Long Bay (Te Oneroa ō Kahu) was one of the most densely settled areas of the North Shore by Tāmaki Māori

Māori settlement of the Auckland Region began around the 13th or 14th centuries. The North Shore was settled by Tāmaki Māori, including people descended from the Tainui migratory canoe and ancestors of figures such as Taikehu and Peretū. During his arrival in New Zealand, Hoturoa, captain of the Tainui, guided the waka to the Waiake Lagoon (Deep Creek), which was a safe anchorage for the canoe.

Many of the early Tāmaki Māori people of the North Shore identified as Ngā Oho. While the poor soils of the East Coast Bays area was a barrier to agriculture and settlement, Long Bay was one of the three most densely settled areas of the North Shore, and the area features extensive archaeological sites. Long Bay was a focal point for transport in the wider area, with many ara (overland paths) connecting Long Bay to Ōkura over the cliffs, and to Oteha and the Lukas Creek in Albany to the south-west.

Many of the headlands of East Coast Bays were sites for defensive pā, including Te Toroa at Torbay, Ōmangaia between Waiake and Browns Bay, and Rahopara at Castor Bay. Outside of Long Bay, most areas of the East Coast Bays were utilised for seasonal resources.

The warrior Maki migrated from the Kāwhia Harbour to his ancestral home in the Auckland Region, likely sometime in the 17th century. Maki conquered and unified many the Tāmaki Māori tribes as Te Kawerau ā Maki, including those of the North Shore.

After Maki's death, his sons settled different areas of his lands, creating new hapū. His sons Manuhiri and Maraeariki settled the North Shore and Hibiscus Coast. Maraeariki's daughter Kahu succeeded him, and she is both the namesake of the North Shore, Te Whenua Roa ō Kahu ("The Greater Lands of Kahu"), and the beach and bay of Long Bay, Te Oneroa ō Kahu ("The Long Beach of Kahu"). Many of the iwi of the North Shore, including Ngāti Manuhiri, Ngāti Maraeariki, Ngāti Kahu, Ngāti Poataniwha, Ngāi Tai Ki Tāmaki and Ngāti Whātua, can trace their lineage to Kahu.

By the 18th century, the Marutūāhu iwi Ngāti Paoa had expanded their influence to include the islands of the Hauraki Gulf and the North Shore. After periods of conflict, peace had been reached by the 1790s. The earliest contact with Europeans began in the late 18th century, which caused many Tāmaki Māori to die of rewharewha, respiratory diseases. During the early 1820s, most Māori of the North Shore fled for the Waikato or Northland due to the threat of war parties during the Musket Wars. Most people had returned by the 1830s, and remained at Te Oneroa until the 1850s.

=== Early European settlement ===
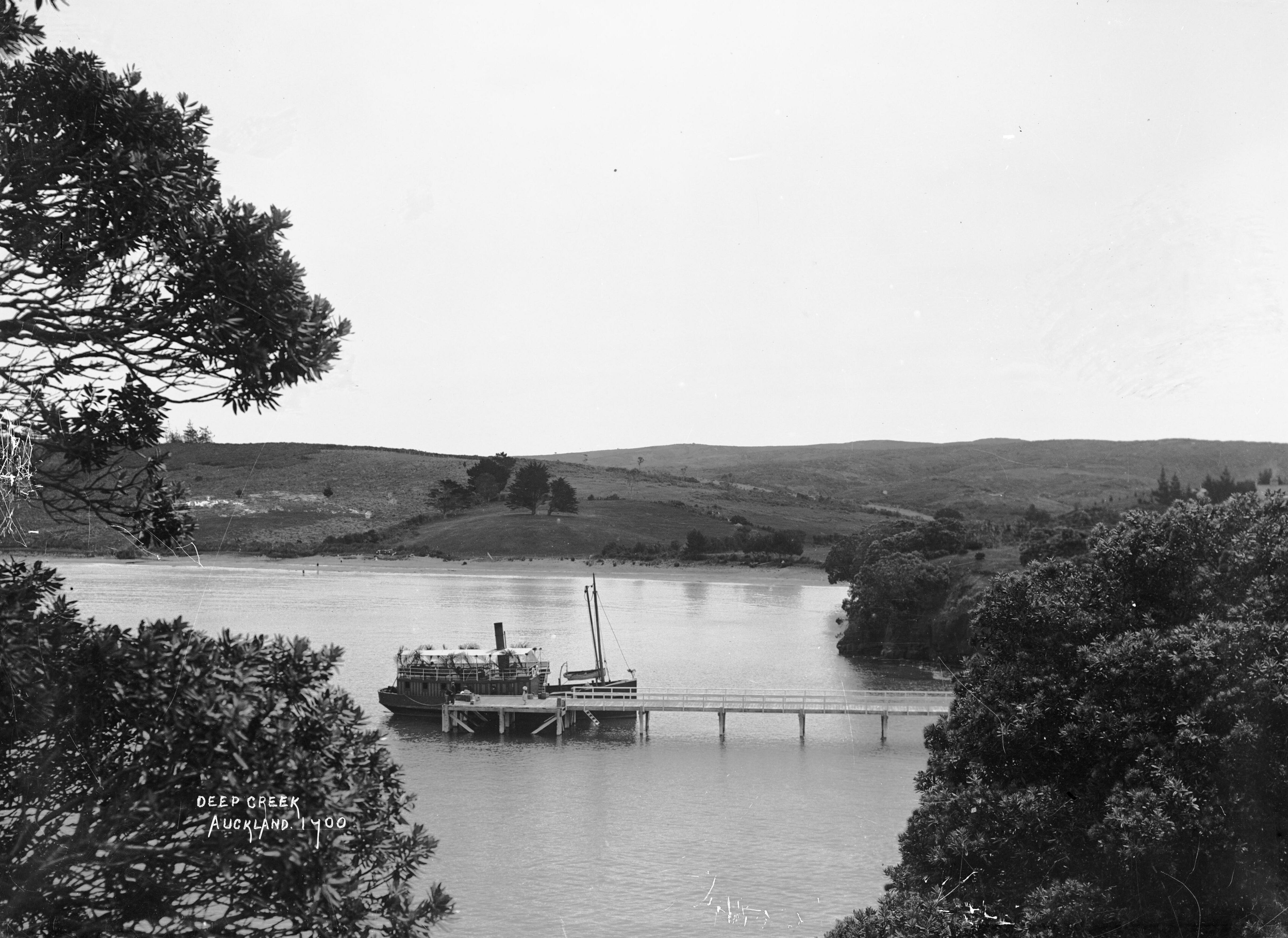
Steamer ferry at Waiake Beach, ca 1910

The first Europeans to visit the area were timber merchants and kauri gum diggers in the 1830s, and large gum digger camps were established at Murrays Bay and Campbells Bay. In 1841, the Crown purchased the Mahurangi and Omaha blocks; an area that spanned from Takapuna to Te Ārai. The purchase involved some iwi with customary interests in the area, such as Ngāti Paoa, other Marutūāhu iwi and Ngāi Tai ki Tāmaki, but not others, such as Te Kawerau ā Maki or Ngāti Rango. The Crown spent until 1873 rectifying this sale, by making further deals with stakeholders.

The first permanent settlers arrived in East Coast Bays in the 1850s. John Logan Campbell purchased the majority of the East Coast Bays in 1864 (Allotment 189, area spanning from Ōkura to Browns Bay), believing that there was coal in the area. The East Coast Bays were seen as an unproductive area for agriculture, and Campbell sold the land, with much of the area becoming dairy farms. Major figures in the latter 19th century include the Vaughan family, who ran a sheep and cattle farm for over 100 years at Long Bay, Captain Charles Cholmondeley-Smith, whose established a sawmill, flaxmill and vineyard at Torbay, Peter Brown at Browns Bay, and English settler Thomas Murray, who farmed Murrays and Mairangi bays.

The East Coast Bays became popular vacation destinations in the 1910s and 1920s. Visitors primarily arrived by steam ships, and the southern East Coast Bays area began to develop after the Milford to Bayswater tram improved access. Until the 1930s, the majority of houses constructed in the bays were holiday baches.

During World War II, the coast from Torbay south was fortified with defenses, including pillboxes along the coastline and hills, and barbed wire ditches. The largest fortification in East Coast Bays was the Castor Bay Battery and Camp, which was disguised as a state housing project.

=== Independent borough and city ===
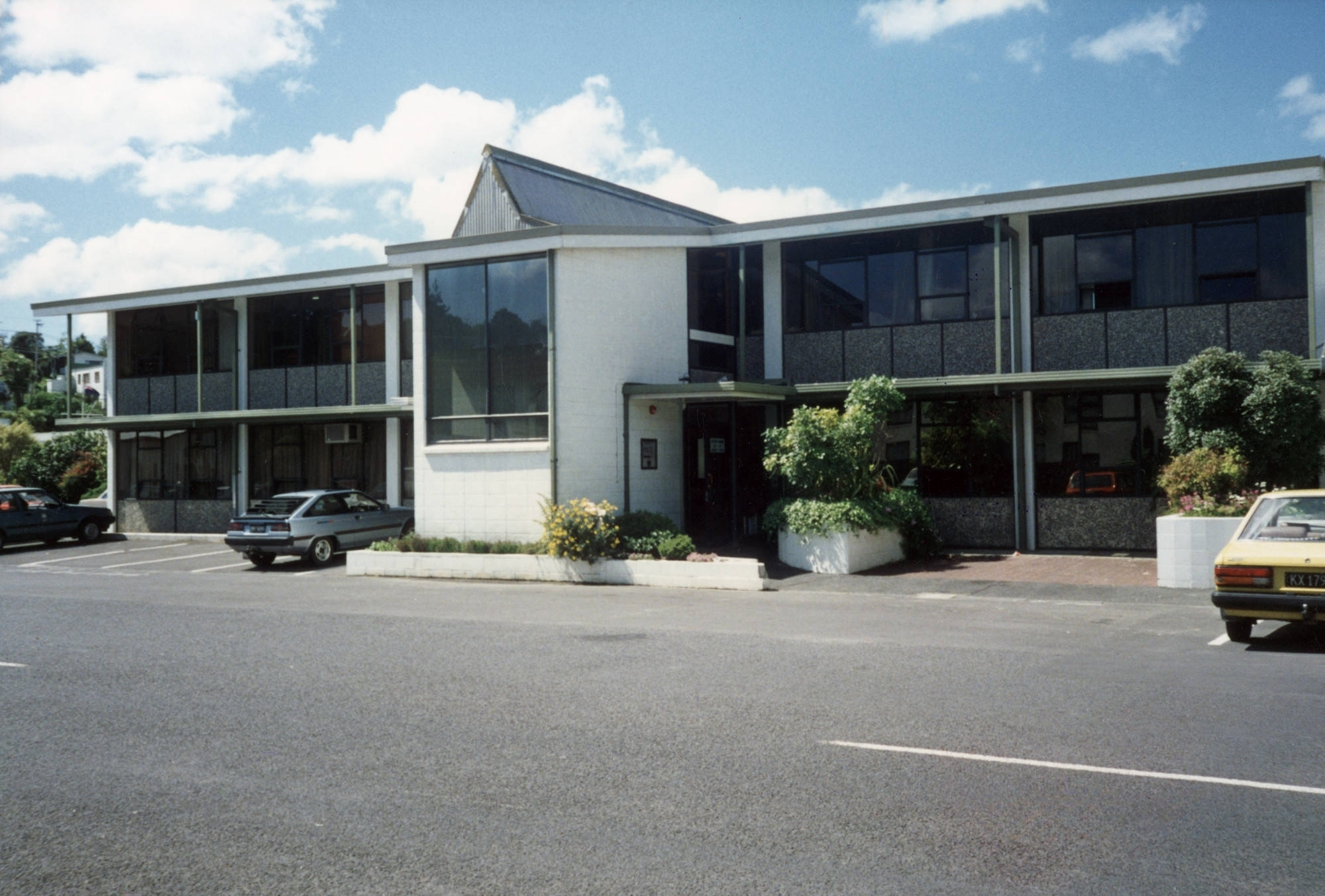
The East Coast Bays City Council buildings in 1989

After the end of World War II, local residents lobbied for the creation of an East Coast Bays borough, separate from Waitemata County. The borough was established in April 1954 with approximately 7,000 residents, and included the area between Torbay to Campbells Bay, excluding Long Bay and Castor Bay. The borough council immediately began working on roading projects to better connect the bays to Auckland, and worked to improve water mains, sewerage, drainage, refuse collection and created a library service. Browns Bay became the administrative and commercial centre of the East Coast Bays Borough, and smaller shopping centres grew in Mairangi Bay and Torbay. In 1959, the Auckland Harbour Bridge was constructed, which led to massive growth in the area, with the area transitioning away from isolated holiday communities and becoming commuter suburbs for Auckland. By 1966, the population had doubled to 12,000 people, increasing to 16,000 by 1971. Between 1971 and 1975, East Coast Bays was the fastest growing area of Auckland, seeing a population increase of 47.3%. This led to the opening of additional facilities such as Long Bay College, and in 1975, the East Coast Bays had grown in size enough that the borough became a city. Over 3,000 dwellings were constructed between 1976 and 1986.

Long Bay Regional Park was opened by the Auckland Regional Council in the early 1970s, becoming one of the first regional parks in Auckland. In 1973, community groups including the Taiorahi Wilderness Committee and Deep Creek Valley Bush Society were established, to oppose the development of suburban housing in native bush areas.

By 1986 the population had reached 31,000. The city was merged into the wider North Shore City in 1989.

=== Further development ===
Long Bay began to develop housing in the 1990s, due to zoning law changes. In the early 1990s, Browns Bay Mall was opened.

== Education ==
The first school in the East Coast Bays was Browns Bay School, established in 1888. This was followed by Campbells Bay Primary School, which opened in August 1925. Population growth in the East Coast Bays area led to the construction of new schools, including Torbay Primary School, Murrays Bay Primary and Intermediate schools, and Rangitoto College. Rangitoto College grew to become the largest secondary school in New Zealand, with a roll of 3775 students as at 1 July 2024.

St John's School was the first Catholic school established in the East Coast Bays area, and was established in Mairangi Bay in 1961. The secular Mairangi Bay School followed soon after in 1967. Long Bay College is a secondary school that opened in 1975. Three further primary schools were established in the 1970s: Glamorgan School in Torbay in 1972, Sherwood School in Browns Bay (1976) and Long Bay Primary School (1979).

In 1973, Kristin School was established at the former Methodist Health Camp in Campbells Bay. As the school grew rapidly, a new campus was opened in Albany in 1978. The Corelli International Academic School of the Arts was a private composite (years 1–13) school which ran specialist programs in visual arts, music, drama and dance as well as the general curriculum. It opened in 2001, and went into receivership in 2016.

== Politics ==
From 1876 until 1954, the area was administered by the Waitemata County, a large rural county north and west of the city of Auckland. In 1954, most of the area split from the county, forming the East Coast Bays Borough, and Castor Bay became a part of the Borough of Takapuna (Takapuna City from 1961). For the next twenty years, Long Bay remained a part of the Waitemata County. In 1974 the county was dissolved, and Long Bay became a rural area incorporated into Takapuna City.

In 1975, the population of the East Coast Bays had increased enough that it became the East Coast Bays City. In 1989, East Coast Bays City, Takapuna City and the surrounding areas were amalgamated to form North Shore City. North Shore City was amalgamated into Auckland Council in November 2010.

Within the Auckland Council, the majority of East Coast Bays is a part of the Hibiscus and Bays local government area governed by the Hibiscus and Bays Local Board. It is a part of the Albany ward, which elects two councillors to the Auckland Council. This area is defined as the East Coast Bays subdivision of the Hibiscus and Bays local board area by Auckland Council. The southernmost of the bays, Castor Bay, is a part of the Devonport-Takapuna local government area governed by the Devonport-Takapuna Local Board. It is a part of the North Shore ward, which elects two councillors to the Auckland Council.

East Coast Bays is also the name of an electorate from which an MP is elected to serve in the New Zealand Parliament, which first formed in 1972. Its current MP is Erica Stanford.

=== Mayors of East Coast Bays ===
Five people served as mayor of the East Coast Bays Borough Council, and two serves as mayor of East Coast Bays City Council.

==== Mayors of East Coast Bays Borough ====
- 1954-1956: Reginald Henry Greville
- 1956-1959: Claude Kendall
- 1959-1962: Reginald Henry Greville
- 1962-1968: Walter Stredwick
- 1968-1974: Noel Liam Bradford
- 1974-1975: Alan Morton McCulloch

==== Mayors of East Coast Bays City ====
- 1975-1983: Alan Morton McCulloch
- 1983-1989: Joseph John (Jack) Hinton

== Bibliography ==
- Cass, David (1989). ECB – the Years to 1989. East Coast Bays City Council.
- Gray, Marie; Sturm, Jennifer, eds. (June 2008). ...And Then Came the Bridge. A History of Long Bay and Torbay. Torbay Historical Society. ISBN 978-0-473-13957-5.
- Sheehan, Vanessa (2019). An Almost Complete History of the East Coast Bays.
- Stone, R. C. J. (2001). From Tamaki-makau-rau to Auckland. Auckland University Press. ISBN 1869402596.
- Verran, David (2010), The North Shore: An Illustrated History, North Shore: Random House, OL 33434370W, Wikidata Q120520385
- Willis, Jenny (2018). Early History of East Coast Bays (Second ed.).
