= Okura Bush Scenic Reserve =

Forest in Auckland Region, New Zealand

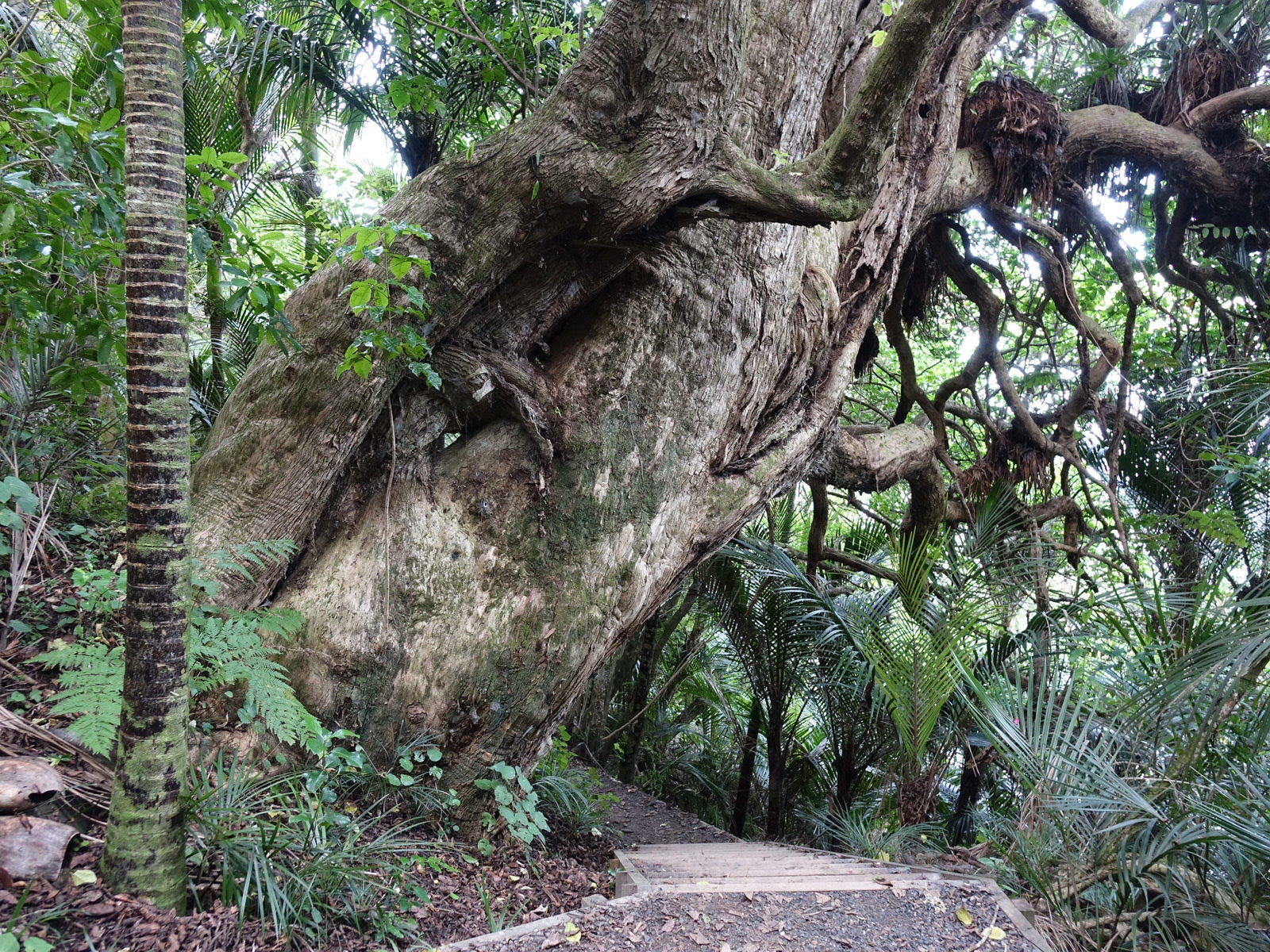
- A large pūriri tree at the Okura Bush Scenic Reserve
- Interactive map of Okura Bush Scenic Reserve
- Coordinates: 36°40′05″S 174°42′50″E

The Okura Bush Scenic Reserve is a protected forested area on the Hibiscus Coast in the Auckland Region, New Zealand. It is the location of the Okura Bush Track.

== Geography ==
The Okura Bush Scenic Reserve is located to the north of the Okura River, on the opposite shore from the village of Ōkura. Dacre Point is a headland at the mouth of the river, at the very eastern point of the reserve. The reserve borders the Long Bay-Okura Marine Reserve, which is located along the Okura River estuary, Karepiro Bay and the Hauraki Gulf coast to the east and south.

== Biodiversity ==
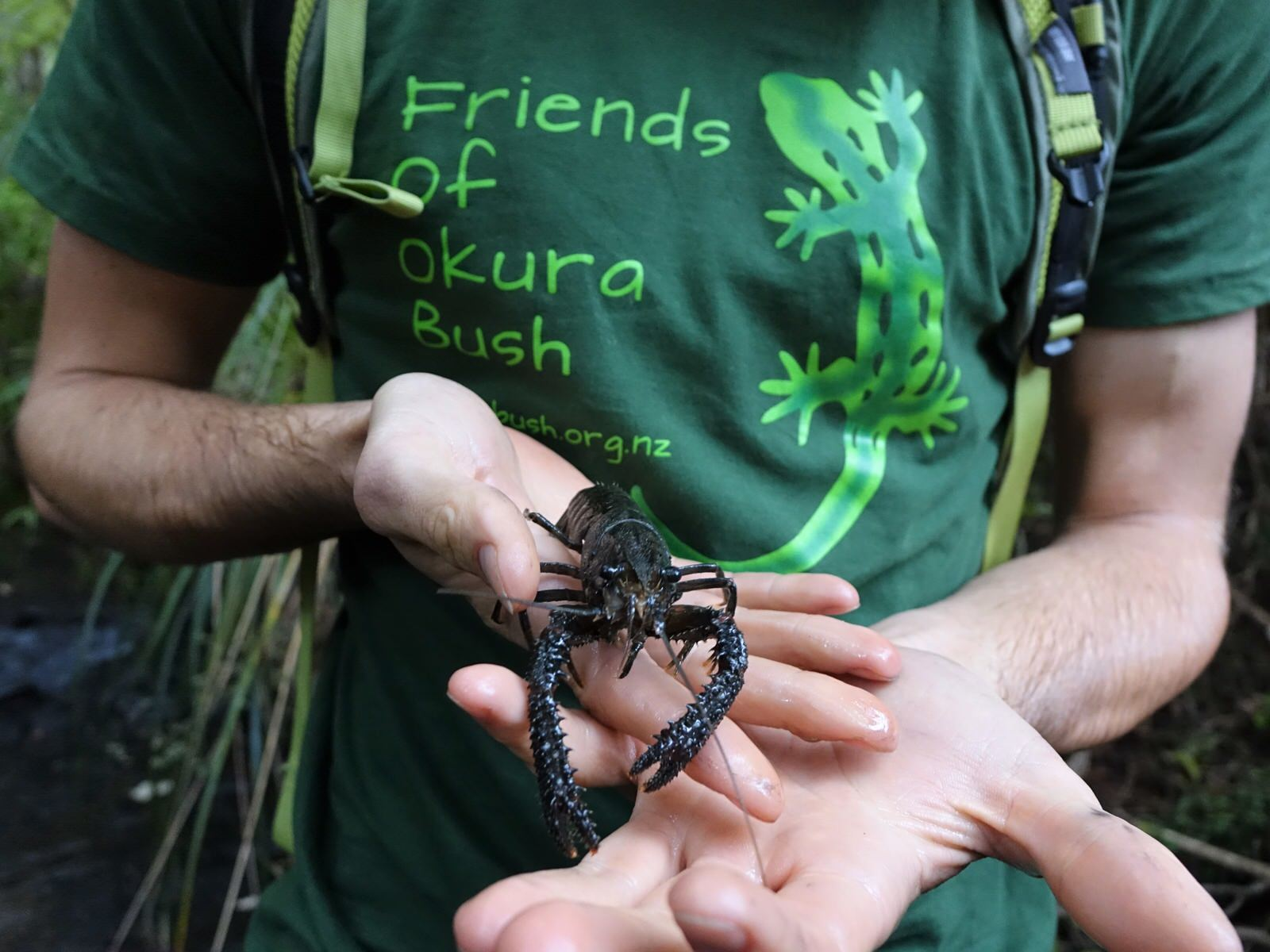
A Paranephrops planifrons held by a member of the Friends of Okura Bush

Okura Bush Scenic Reserve is a part of the Okura Bush and Shell Barriers biodiversity focus area, notable as a transitionary area between forest and estuary. The reserve features a large grove of pūriri trees. Other areas predominantly feature a mix of old growth and regenerating forest.

== History ==
The northern shore of the Okura River was traditionally known as Otaimaro, and was an extensive Māori settlement. In 1848, Henry Dacre and his father Captain Ranulph Dacre purchased the lands surrounding the river, creating the Weiti Station. Their house, the Dacre Cottage, was built circa 1855 from locally made bricks.

The reserve was established in 1991, under the name Okura Estuary Scenic Reserve.

In 2014, the Friends of Okura Bush was established, as an organisation dedicated to the survival and protection of the forest.

In 2018, the walkway was temporary closed in order to combat the threat of kauri dieback, and as of 2023 remains closed.
