= Pōhutukawa Bay =

Popular nude beach along the North Shore, Auckland, New Zealand

- Beach
- Coordinates: 36.668703°S 174.746804°E
- Location: Long Bay Regional Park

Pōhutukawa Bay is a beach north of Long Bay, located on the North Shore of Auckland. It is situated northeast of Ōkura, close to Piripiri Point. Directly south of Pōhutukawa Bay Beach is Granny's Bay Beach, and a little further south is Long Bay Regional Park. The beach is accessible only at low tide, and it is among one of Auckland's most popular naturist beaches. Public nudity is technically legal on any New Zealand beach where it is "known to occur". Getting to the beach requires going through the coastal track, a 6 km (3.7 mi) walk that starts from the beach carparks, and ends at the Ōkura River.
