= Songbird (disambiguation) =

A songbird is a bird belonging to the suborder Passeri of Passeriformes, also known as Oscines.

Songbird or Song Bird may also refer to:

- Asian koel, a member of the cuckoo order of birds, the Cuculiformes, traditionally held in high regard for its song.

== Film and television ==
- Songbird (2018 film), a British comedy-drama film
- Songbird (2020 film), an American science-fiction thriller film
- Song Bird (TV series), a 1989–1990 Hong Kong historical drama series
- Songbird (TV program), a 2008 Philippine variety show
- Songbird, an airplane in the 1950s American TV series Sky King

== Music ==
- Songbirds (group), an Australian country music group

=== Record labels ===
- Song Bird Records, an American record label
- SongBird, a Dutch record label

=== Albums ===
- Song Bird (Deniece Williams album), 1977
- Song Bird (Margo Smith album), 1976
- Songbird (Barbra Streisand album) or the title song (see below), 1978
- Songbird (Eva Cassidy album), 1998
- Songbird (Kokia album), 1999
- Songbird (Tayla Alexander album) or the title song, 2012
- Songbird (Waylon Jennings album), 2025
- Songbird (Willie Nelson album), 2006
- Songbird: Rare Tracks and Forgotten Gems, a box set by Emmylou Harris, 2007
- Songbird (Marina Prior box set), 2014

=== Songs ===
- "Songbird" (Barbra Streisand song), 1978
- "Songbird" (Bernard Fanning song), 2005
- "Songbird" (Ellen Benediktson song), from Melodifestivalen 2014
- "Songbird" (Fleetwood Mac song), 1977; covered by Eva Cassidy (1998) and Willie Nelson (2006)
- "Songbird" (Kenny G composition), 1987
- "Songbird" (NCT Wish song), 2024
- "Songbird" (Oasis song), 2003
- "Songbird", by Abigail from Home...Again, 2005
- "Songbird", by the Bee Gees from Main Course, 1975
- "Songbird", by Jeff Lynne's ELO from From Out of Nowhere, 2019
- "Songbirds", by Silversun Pickups from Widow's Weeds, 2019

== Other uses ==
- Songbird (character), a Marvel Comics superhero
- Songbird (horse) (foaled 2013), an American Thoroughbred racehorse
- Songbird (software), a 2006–2013 audio player
- Songbird Airways, a charter airline based in Miami, Florida, US
- Songbird, a character in the video game BioShock Infinite
- Songbird Acquisitions, a former majority owner of Canary Wharf Group

== See also ==
- Birdsong
- Mariah Carey (born 1969), American singer-songwriter nicknamed "Songbird Supreme"
- Regine Velasquez (born 1970), Filipino singer nicknamed "Asia's Songbird"
