= Tayla Alexander =

New Zealand singer (born 2000)

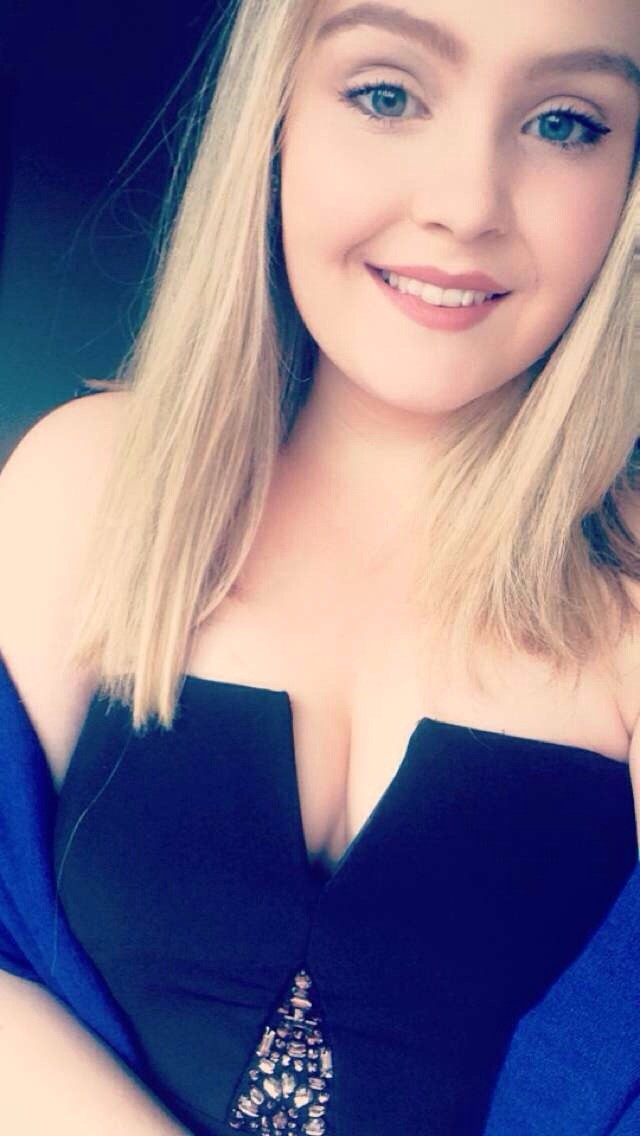
- Tayla Alexander at home

Background information
- Born: Tayla Alexander; 30 December 2000 (age 25); Durban, South Africa
- Genre: Classical crossover
- Instrument: Singing
- Years active: 2012–present
- Label: Independent

Tayla Alexander (born 30 December 2000) is a New Zealand singer who has been hailed as an up-and-coming opera star by New Zealand media. Tayla's debut album Songbird charted in the top 10 on both the Independent Music New Zealand Album charts (IMNZ), and the New Zealand Music Charts, making her the youngest artist to appear on the New Zealand music charts.

Covering opera, classical and easy listening genres, Tayla has performed songs in English, Italian, Chinese and Maori.

Tayla has performed for dignitaries around New Zealand, including Dame Malvina Major, Prime Minister John Key and Sir Peter Leitch.

== Early life ==
Tayla was born in South Africa but moved to Auckland, New Zealand at six months old, when her family emigrated.

Tayla began singing at the age of four. She has been a regular competitor in Auckland-based singing contests The North Shore Performing Arts Competition and Opera Idol.

At just 11 years of age she was signed to an independent music label. Three years later, Tayla won the 2014 Judges Special Award in the North Harbour Club AIMES Awards, which recognise young achievers across a range of field. Previous AIMES award winners include Lorde.

In 2017 Tayla became the youngest scholarship student ever to train at the Auckland Opera Studio where former students include Sol3 Mio brothers Pene and Amitai Pat. She is currently tutored by Frances Wilson ONZM.

She attended school at Long Bay College on Auckland's North Shore, and is studying music, majoring in Classical Voice, at the University of Waikato, after gaining an excellence in NCEA and receiving a $30,000 Sir Edmund Hillary Scholarship. The Sir Edmund Hillary Scholarship Programme is a scholarship for University of Waikato students showing leadership capabilities, academic excellence and achievements in sport or creative and performing arts, and is designed to foster future leaders, within the values of New Zealand's greatest explorer, Sir Edmund Hillary.

== Career ==
Songbird was produced by Bruce Lynch, who has worked with Dame Kiri Te Kanawa and British singer-songwriter Cat Stevens. Her debut album, Songbird was released in the New Zealand market in November 2012.

In November 2012, around the time of the album's release, Tayla performed two songs from the album, "Hine e Hine" and "A Child Is Born", on TVNZ's Good Morning breakfast program.

Tayla was selected to sing at the 19th annual Christmas in the Park at the Auckland Domain in Auckland, New Zealand in December 2012. She sang "Pie Jesu" to a crowd of more than 200,000. Highlights were broadcast on TV 3.

In February 2013, for the second year in a row, Tayla sang at the 2013 New Zealander of the Year Awards.

In April 2013, Tayla was given the opportunity to perform in front of Dame Malvina Major at a masterclass workshop in Hamilton.

As part of a New Zealand Music Month series, TVNZ's current affairs program Seven Sharp filmed a feature story on Tayla which aired nationally in May 2013.

In September 2013, Tayla was approached by Disney Channel Australia New Zealand to film a feature for the network's This Is Who I Am segment. Filming took place at Tayla's family home and at Takapuna's Bruce Mason Centre.

To promote the release of her two new singles, TVNZ's Good Morning invited Tayla to perform Maori love song "Pokerekere Ana" on the show in November 2013.

In 2014, Tayla backed a New Zealand-wide anti-bullying initiative, Beef With Bullies, after going public with her experience of being bullied at school and online.

She has released a number of music videos, covering songs including A Time for Us and Nella Fantasia – arranged by Carl Doy – Dark Waltz and Fields of Gold, with her music available on Apple Music and Reverbnation, and has been interviewed on United States radio station KITC FM 106.5. Her 2015 collaboration with Swedish soprano Viktoria Tocca on Do You Hear What I Hear was picked up on radio in Europe, the United States, South Africa, Hong Kong and Australia.

In 2017 Tayla performed as a featured soloist for the Auckland Youth Orchestra's Baroque concert in 2017.

Her performance with the Auckland Youth Orchestra of Handle's Lascia Chi’o pianga was recognized by the For Those Who Love Opera Facebook page, which is followed by more than 280,000 people, with For Those Who Love Opera sharing her work. Later that year she also featured in the Auckland Opera Studio's Winter Series at the Sculptureum in Matakana. The series highlighted rising stars on the opera scene.

In 2017 she was again profiled on TVNZ current affairs program Seven Sharp.

Her version of Kate Bush's Wuthering Heights was picked up by a German radio station in May 2018, with her YouTube video of the song topping more than one million views in early 2019.

In 2019 she further expanded her repertoire, launching a YouTube vlog, detailing her experiences of 'adulting' including moving out of home, going to university and achieving the scholarships. In January 2019, she spoke frankly in an interview on Radio Live about the challenges of NCEA and her winning of the Sir Edmund Hillary Scholarship.

== Reception ==
Dame Malvina Major has said Tayla is a promising talent who, with her strong determination, could have a strong career in opera. Carl Doy, who collaborated with Tayla on Wuthering Heights has described her as an 'extraordinary talent' while guitarist Gray Bartlett, who collaborated with Tayla on her 2019 version of Make You Feel My Love, says she is 'on the verge of worldwide recognition'.

== Discography ==
=== Studio albums ===
Album	Album details	Charts	Certifications (sales thresholds)
Album	Album details	IMNZ	Certifications (sales thresholds)
Songbird	Released: November 2012; Label: Independent; Formats: CD, Digital download	10	–

=== Studio singles ===
You Raise Me Up, featuring Nick Jones

- Released: February 2013
- Label: Independent
- Formats: Digital download

Hallelujah

You Needed Me

- Released: November 2013
- Label: Independent
- Formats: CD, Digital download

Nelly Fantasia

Air on the G String

- Released September 2015
- Label: Independent
- Formats: Digital download

Do You Hear What I Hear – collaboration on Viktoria Tocca's Merry Christmas EP

- Released November 2015
- Label: Independent
- Formats: Digital download

Fields of Gold – with Gray Bartlett

- Released January 2016
- Label: Independent
- Formats: Digital download

A Time for Us (Love theme)

- Released June 2017
- Label: Independent
- Formats: Digital download

Rinaldo, HWV 7a: Lascia ch'io pianga (Live and featuring the Auckland Youth Orchestra)

- Released May 2018
- Label: Independent
- Formats: Digital download

Wuthering Heights, featuring Hadley Ronayne

- Released May 2018
- Label: Independent
- Formats: Digital download

Make You Feel My Love, with Gray Bartlett

- Released January 2019
- Label: Independent
- Formats: Digital download

== Television appearances ==
- Sticky TV (2012)
- Good Morning (2012)
- The Erin Simpson Show (2013)
- Seven Sharp (2013)
- Disney Channel Australia (2013)
- Good Morning (2013)
- Seven Sharp (2017)
