= Long Bay, New Zealand =

Long Bay
- Suburb
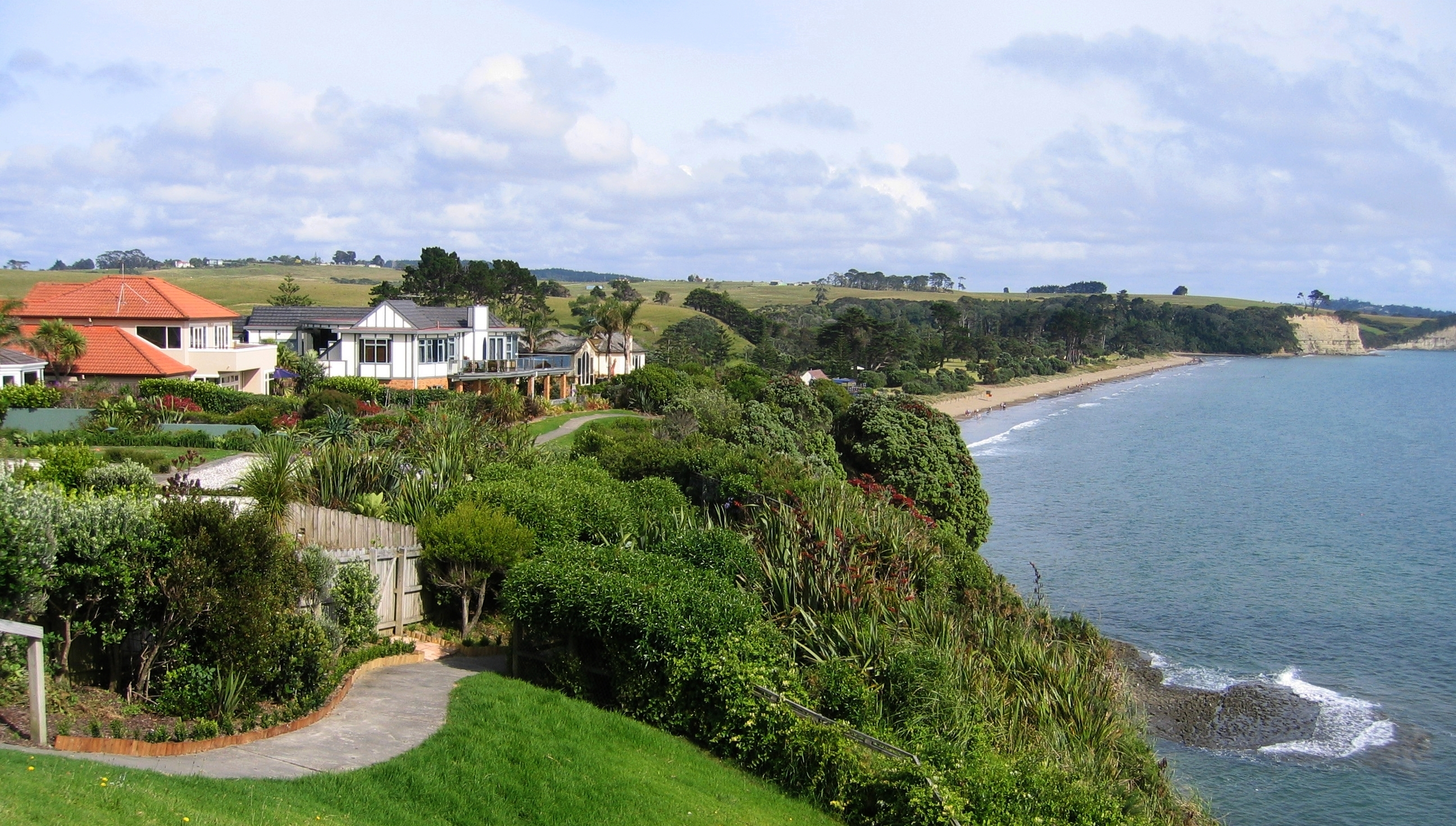
- Interactive map of Long Bay
- Coordinates: 36.685°S 174.741°E
- Country: New Zealand
- City: Auckland
- Local authority: Auckland Council
- Electoral ward: Albany ward
- Local board: Hibiscus and Bays
- Established: 1862

Area
  - Land: 285 ha (700 acres)

Population (June 2025)
  - Total: 4,210
  - Density: 1,480/km^{2} (3,830/sq mi)
- Postcode: 0792

Okura	(Karepiro Bay)	(Hauraki Gulf)
	Long Bay	(Hauraki Gulf)
Torbay Heights	Torbay	(Hauraki Gulf)

Long Bay (Māori: Oneroa) is one of the northernmost suburbs of the North Shore, part of the contiguous Auckland metropolitan area located in New Zealand.

== Etymology ==
The origin of the name Long Bay is unclear. It is either a geographical description of the long beach, or named after Alfred or Arthur Long, some of the early farmers in the area. Traditional Māori names for the area include Whakarewatoto, referencing a battle in southern Long Bay, and Te Oneroa ō Kahu ("The Long Beach of Kahu"), referencing the Ngāti Kahu ancestress Kahu. The shortened version of this name, Te Oneroa, was used to describe the Ngāti Kahu settlement in the area until the 1850s, and the name Oneroa is used in modern contexts.

== Geography ==
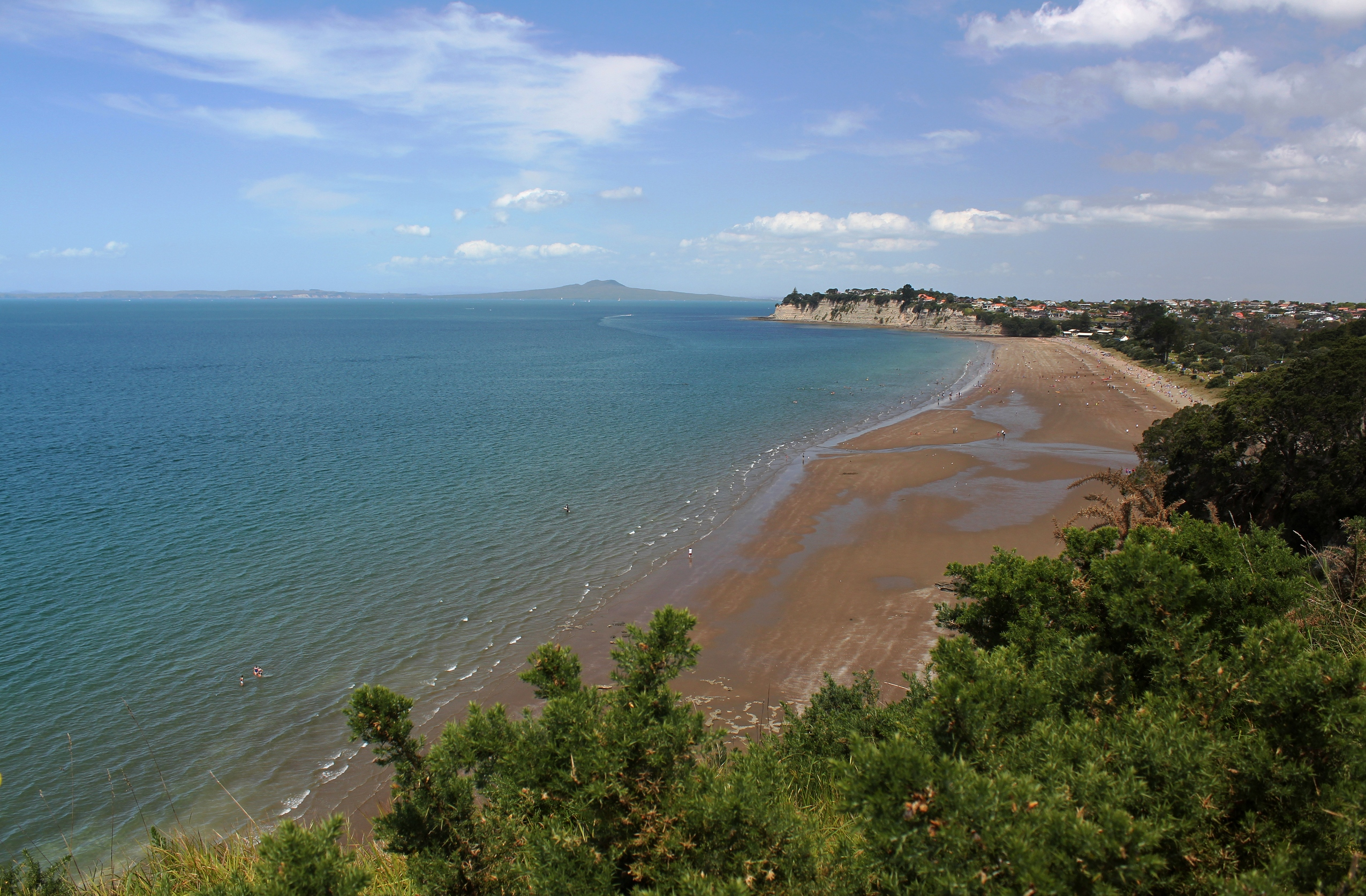
Long Bay is the site of an extensive beach. The beach forms a part of the Long Bay Regional Park, while the surrounding shoreline is a part of the Long Bay-Okura Marine Reserve

Long Bay is a suburb of the North Shore of New Zealand, and the northernmost suburb of the North Shore along the east coast of the Hauraki Gulf. The suburb has two major streams: Vaughan Stream / Awaruaika Creek, and the Awaruku Creek in the south (also known as the Waikariwatoto Creek). The bay forms the eastern border of the suburb, and looks out to the Hauraki Gulf and the Coromandel Peninsula.

The eastern coast is occupied by the Long Bay Regional Park, and the shoreline is in Long Bay-Okura Marine Reserve, which opened in 1995. The beach is sandy and swimming is safe. It offers forest walks and scenic cliffs. This beach has low tide water. Smaller beaches to the north, such as Pohutukawa Bay, accessible except at high tide, are among Auckland's most popular naturist spots; The headland at the northeast of the suburb is called Piripiri Point.

The land at Long Bay is primarily made up of Waitemata Group sandstone, which formed during the Miocene approximately 16 to 22 million years ago on the seafloor. Gradually, the seafloor was uplifted due to tectonic forces. Prior to human settlement, inland Long Bay was primarily a northern broadleaf podocarp forest, dominated by tōtara, mataī, miro, kauri and kahikatea trees. Pōhutukawa trees were a major feature of the coastline.

== History ==
=== Māori history ===
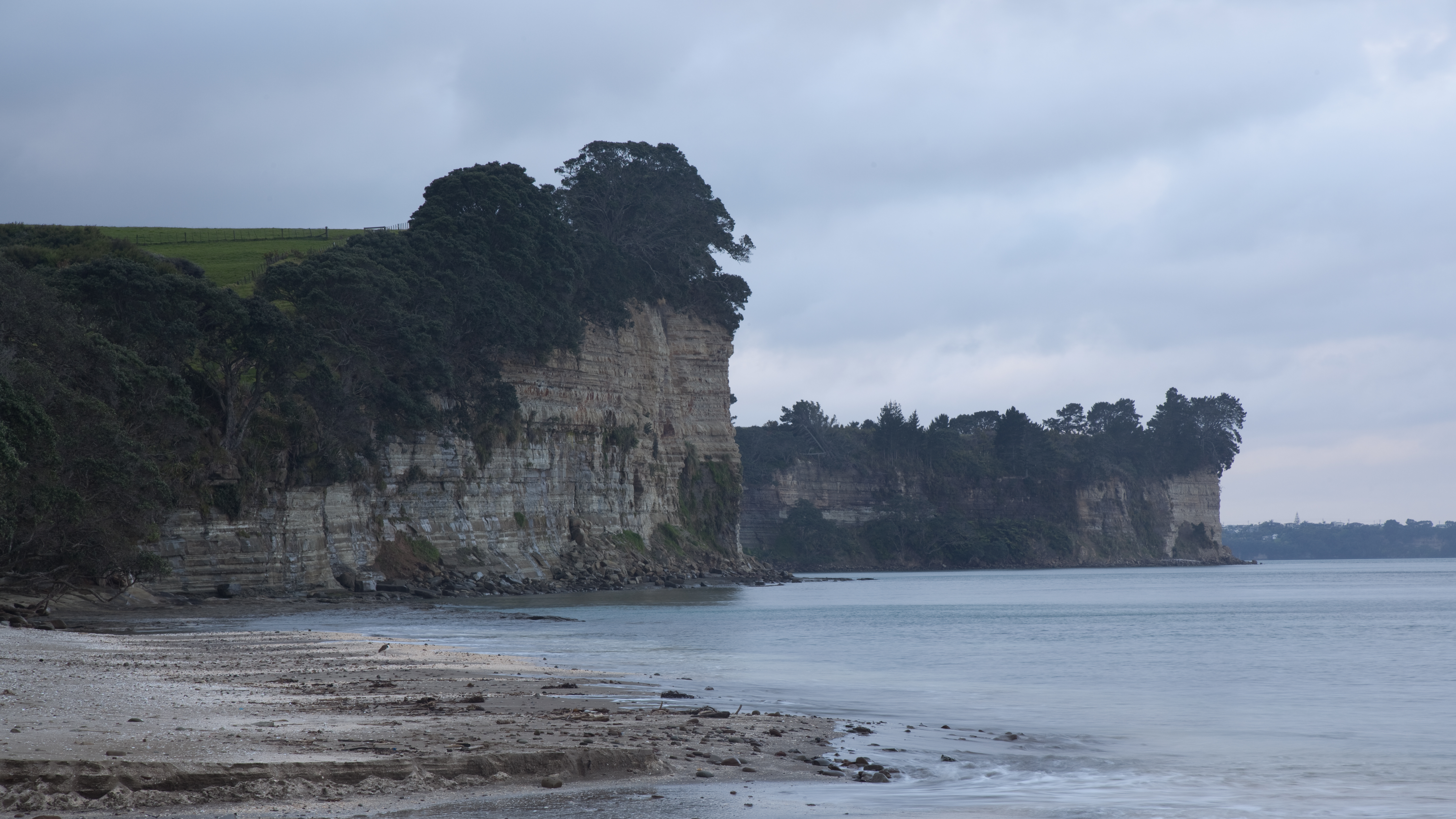
Te Piripiri / Pipiri Point (right) was used as a defensive pā site

Māori settlement of the Auckland Region began around the 13th or 14th centuries. The North Shore was settled by Tāmaki Māori, including people descended from the Tainui migratory canoe and ancestors of figures such as Taikehu and Peretū.

Many of the early Tāmaki Māori people of the North Shore identified as Ngā Oho. While the poor soils of the East Coast Bays area was a barrier to agriculture and settlement, Long Bay was one of the three most densely settled areas of the North Shore, and the area features extensive archaeological sites. Long Bay was a focal point for transport in the wider area, with many ara (overland paths) connecting Long Bay to Ōkura over the cliffs, and to Oteha and the Lukas Creek in Albany to the south-west.

The warrior Maki migrated from the Kāwhia Harbour to his ancestral home in the Auckland Region, likely sometime in the 17th century. Maki conquered and unified many the Tāmaki Māori tribes as Te Kawerau ā Maki, including those of the North Shore. A major conflict between Maki and Ngā Oho occurred in southern Long Bay called Te Whakarewatoto, which became a name his Ngāti Manuhiri descendants used for the area.

After Maki's death, his sons settled different areas of his lands, creating new hapū. His sons Manuhiri and Maraeariki settled the North Shore and Hibiscus Coast. Maraeariki's daughter Kahu succeeded him, and she is both the namesake of the North Shore, Te Whenua Roa ō Kahu ("The Greater Lands of Kahu"), and the beach and bay of Long Bay, Te Oneroa ō Kahu ("The Long Beach of Kahu"). Many of the iwi of the North Shore, including Ngāti Manuhiri, Ngāti Maraeariki, Ngāti Kahu, Ngāti Poataniwha, Ngāi Tai Ki Tāmaki and Ngāti Whātua, can trace their lineage to Kahu.

From the conquest until the early 19th century, Ngāti Kahu and Ngāti Poataniwha, two hapū who descend from Kahu, lived at Long Bay. A defensive headland pā was constructed at Te Piripiri (Pipiri Point), and a kāinga was settled at Te Awaruaika (the shores of Awaruaika, or Vaughans' Stream). By the 18th century, the Marutūāhu iwi Ngāti Paoa had expanded their influence to include the islands of the Hauraki Gulf and the North Shore. After periods of conflict, peace had been reached by the 1790s. The earliest contact with Europeans began in the late 18th century, which caused many Tāmaki Māori to die of rewharewha, respiratory diseases. During the early 1820s, most Māori of the North Shore fled for the Waikato or Northland due to the threat of war parties during the Musket Wars. Most people had returned by the 1830s, and remained at Te Oneroa until the 1850s.

=== European settlement ===
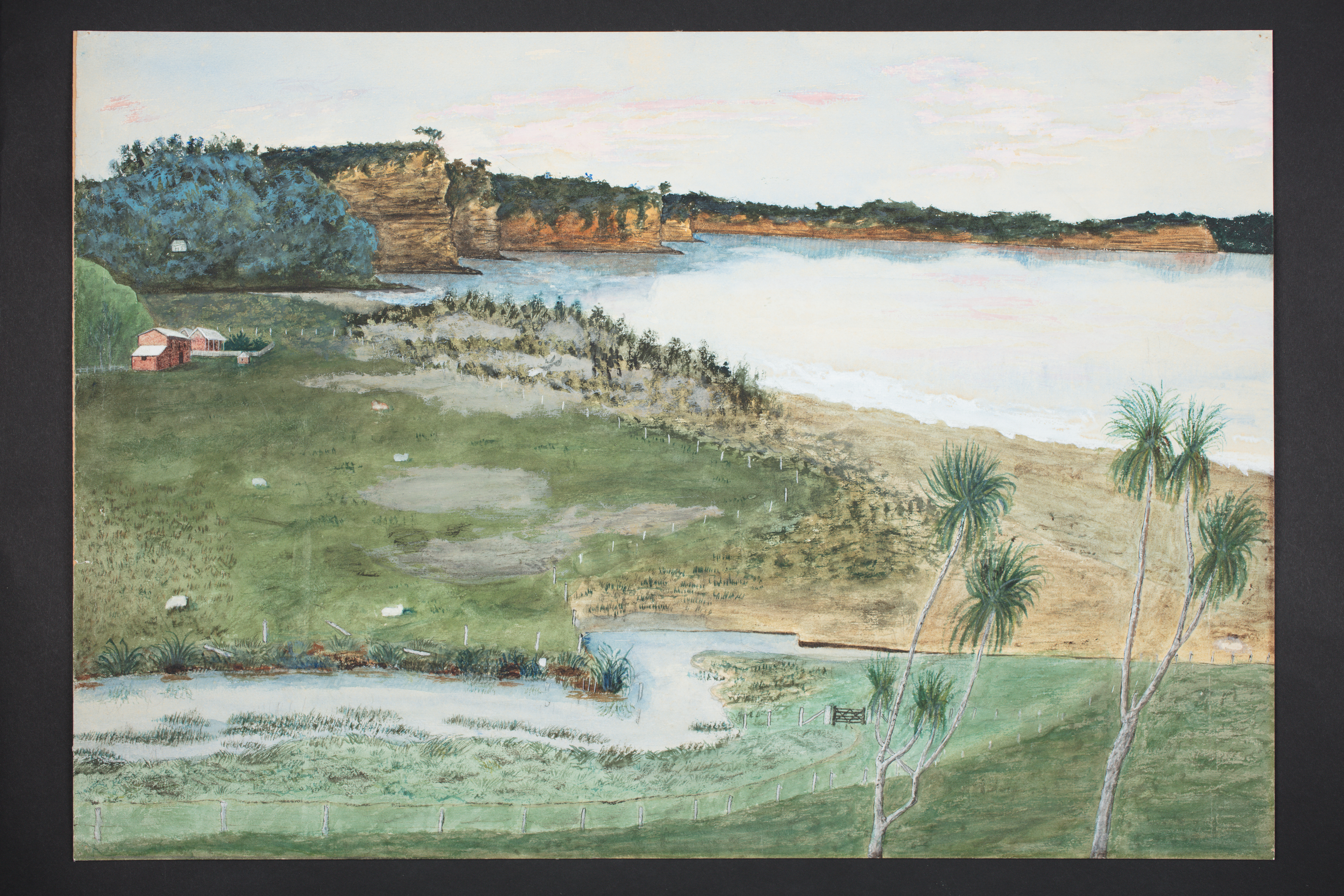
Watercolour by Alice McArthur showing Long Bay in 1897

The Vaughan Homestead is the historic farmhouse of the Vaughan family, who farmed the area for over 100 years.

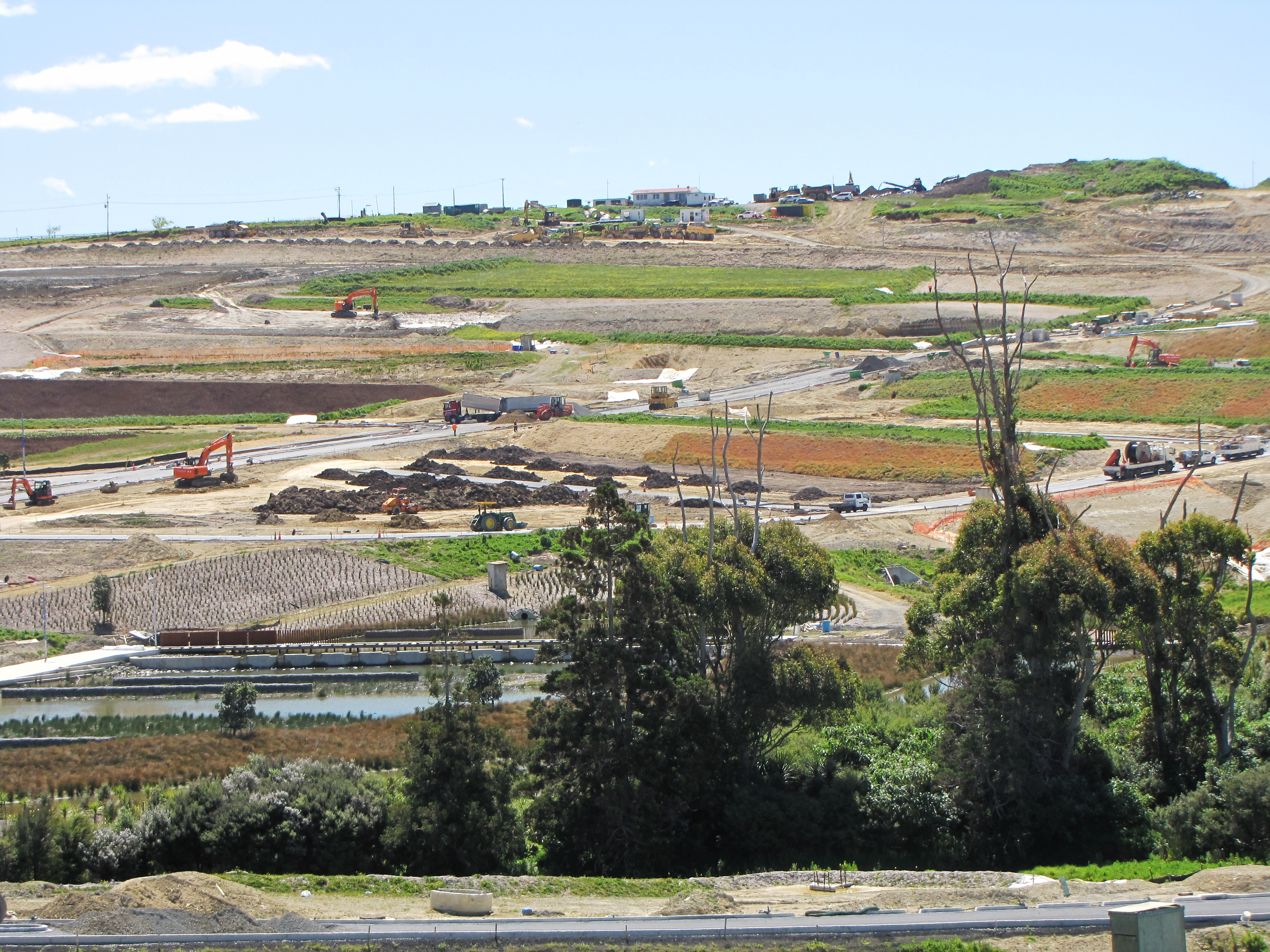
Residential and commercial development underway in 2017

The first Europeans to visit the area were in the 1830s, when timber merchants and kauri gum diggers harvested resources from Long Bay. In 1841, the Crown purchased the Mahurangi and Omaha blocks; an area that spanned from Takapuna to Te Ārai. The purchase involved some iwi with customary interests in the area, such as Ngāti Paoa, other Marutūāhu iwi and Ngāi Tai ki Tāmaki, but not others, such as Te Kawerau ā Maki or Ngāti Rango. The Crown spent until 1873 rectifying this sale, by making further deals with stakeholders.

The first European settlers arrived in the 1850s, including Alexander Pannil and Joshua Alias, who worked to clear the bush for farming. In 1860, Captain Charles Cholmondeley-Smith and his family leased land at Long Bay for a sheep farm, but left after three years as the venture was unsuccessful. In 1862, the Vaughan family purchased 600 acres of farmland at Long Bay, where they ran a sheep and cattle farm for 100 years. The historic Vaughan Homestead was constructed in 1863.

In 1929 Tom Vaughan, opened a campground for holidaymakers at the southern end of the beach, near the Awaruku Creek. After the death of their mother Margaret Vaughan in 1935, the Vaughan sons Bert and Tom split the property into two east and west sections and farmed these separately. During the Second World War, a gun emplacement was built on the coast north of the park in case to defend against invasion by Japanese forces.

The area was sparsely populated in the first half of the 20th century, with only five cottages in Long Bay existing in 1942. After the construction of the Auckland Harbour Bridge in 1959, the population of the area began to gradually increase. In 1965 the Vaughan family sold the eastern section of their farm to the Auckland Regional Council, who developed Long Bay Regional Park in the early 1970s as one of the first regional parks in Auckland. Long Bay College was established in 1975, when the surrounding area was still predominantly rural farmland.

In the 1990s zoning changes at Long Bay enabled significantly more housing to be constructed. Areas of farmland above Long Bay Regional Park were protected from development by an Environment Court ruling in July 2008. Due to changes in the Auckland Council's Unitary Plan, major housing developments were constructed at Long Bay in the late 2010s.

== Local government ==
The first local government in the area was the Lake District, which was established in 1866, followed by the Weiti Highway Board in 1867. From 1876 the area was administered by the Waitemata County, a large rural county north and west of the city of Auckland. In 1954, the area to the south formed the East Coast Bays Borough, with Long Bay remaining a part of the Waitemata County.

On 1 August 1974, the Waitemata County was dissolved, and Long Bay became a rural area incorporated into Takapuna City. In 1989, Long Bay was merged into the North Shore City. North Shore City was amalgamated into Auckland Council in November 2010.

Within the Auckland Council, Long Bay is a part of the Hibiscus and Bays local government area governed by the Hibiscus and Bays Local Board. It is a part of the Albany ward, which elects two councillors to the Auckland Council.

== Amenities ==
- Long Bay Regional Park, one of the most visited regional parks in Auckland. Within the park is the Vaughan Homestead, the historic home of the Vaughan family which was leased to the Torbay Historical Society in 1993, who restored the building.
- Long Bay-Okura Marine Reserve, the first urban marine reserve in New Zealand, established in 1995.
- Sir Peter Blake Marine Education and Recreation Centre, a marine educational facility that was established in 1990.

== Demographics ==
Long Bay covers 2.85 km^{2} (1.10 sq mi) and had an estimated population of 4,210 as of June 2025, with a population density of 1,477 people per km^{2}.

Historical population
Year	Pop.	±% p.a.
2006	147	—
2013	183	+3.18%
2018	1,365	+49.46%
2023	3,141	+18.14%

Long Bay had a population of 3,141 in the 2023 New Zealand census, an increase of 1,776 people (130.1%) since the 2018 census, and an increase of 2,958 people (1616.4%) since the 2013 census. There were 1,548 males, 1,584 females and 12 people of other genders in 933 dwellings. 3.1% of people identified as LGBTIQ+. The median age was 36.6 years (compared with 38.1 years nationally). There were 705 people (22.4%) aged under 15 years, 588 (18.7%) aged 15 to 29, 1,557 (49.6%) aged 30 to 64, and 291 (9.3%) aged 65 or older.

People could identify as more than one ethnicity. The results were 50.6% European (Pākehā); 3.0% Māori; 1.3% Pasifika; 46.2% Asian; 3.9% Middle Eastern, Latin American and African New Zealanders (MELAA); and 1.2% other, which includes people giving their ethnicity as "New Zealander". English was spoken by 89.1%, Māori by 0.3%, Samoan by 0.3%, and other languages by 45.8%. No language could be spoken by 2.6% (e.g. too young to talk). New Zealand Sign Language was known by 0.1%. The percentage of people born overseas was 62.0, compared with 28.8% nationally.

Religious affiliations were 27.4% Christian, 1.4% Hindu, 1.4% Islam, 1.4% Buddhist, 0.1% New Age, and 1.6% other religions. People who answered that they had no religion were 62.8%, and 4.0% of people did not answer the census question.

Of those at least 15 years old, 840 (34.5%) people had a bachelor's or higher degree, 876 (36.0%) had a post-high school certificate or diploma, and 480 (19.7%) people exclusively held high school qualifications. The median income was $49,800, compared with $41,500 nationally. 627 people (25.7%) earned over $100,000 compared to 12.1% nationally. The employment status of those at least 15 was that 1,320 (54.2%) people were employed full-time, 330 (13.5%) were part-time, and 51 (2.1%) were unemployed.

== Education ==
Long Bay College is a secondary (years 9 - 13) school with a roll of 1,960 students. The college celebrated its 25th jubilee in 2000. Long Bay School is a contributing primary (years 1 - 6) school with a roll of 511 students. Both schools are coeducational. Rolls are as of July 2026.

== Bibliography ==
- Bloomfield, G.T. (1973). The Evolution of Local Government Areas in Metropolitan Auckland, 1840–1971. Auckland University Press, Oxford University Press. ISBN 0-19-647714-X.
- Gray, Marie; Sturm, Jennifer, eds. (June 2008). ...And Then Came the Bridge. A History of Long Bay and Torbay. Torbay Historical Society. ISBN 978-0-473-13957-5.
- Stone, R. C. J. (2001). From Tamaki-makau-rau to Auckland. Auckland University Press. ISBN 1869402596.
- Verran, David (2010), The North Shore: An Illustrated History, North Shore: Random House, OL 33434370W, Wikidata Q120520385
- Willis, Jenny (2018). Early History of East Coast Bays (Second ed.).
