= Sir Peter Blake Marine Education and Recreation Centre =

Coordinates: 36.690052°S 174.752203°E

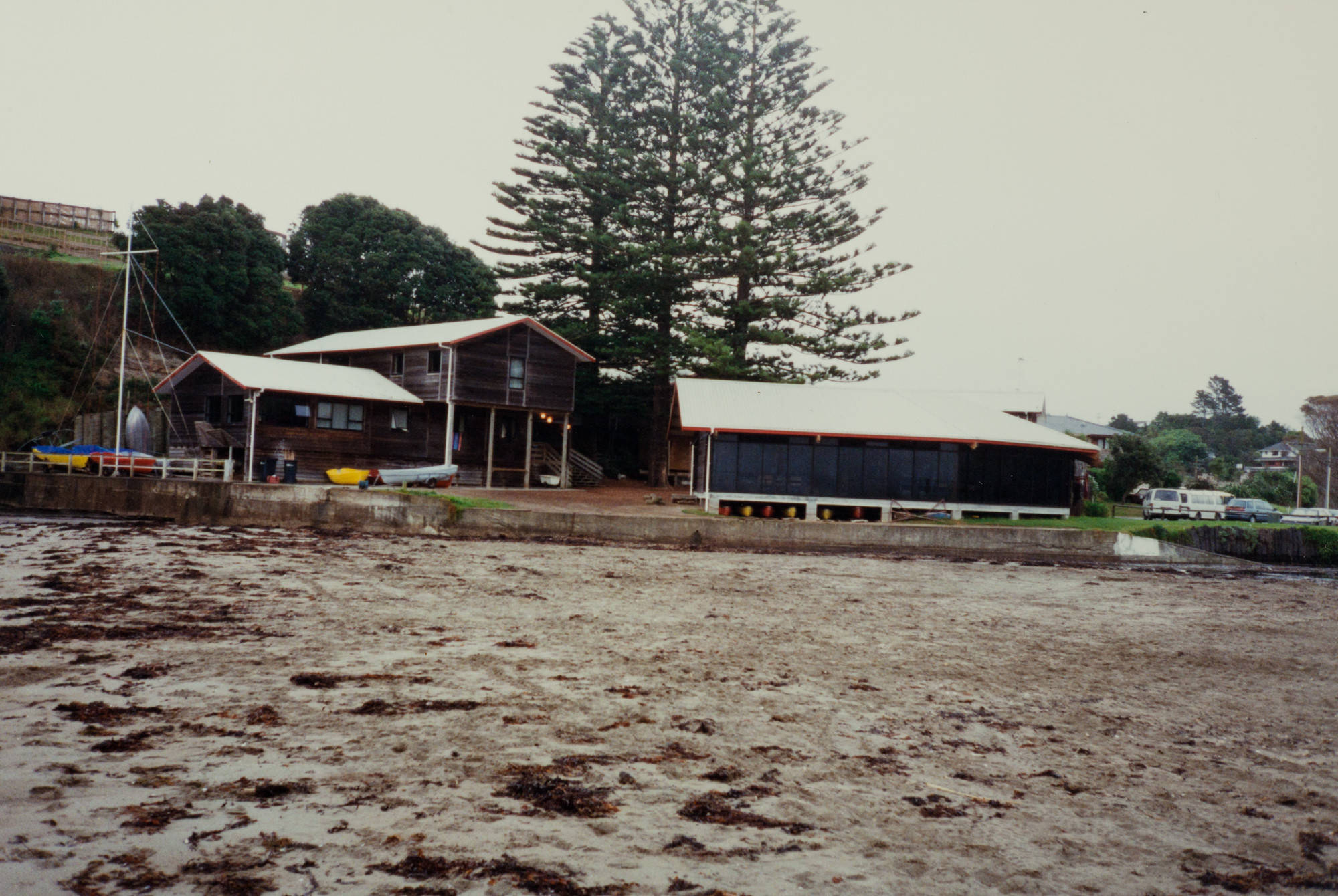

General information
- Type: Marine Education and Recreation Centre
- Location: 1045 Beach Road, Torbay, Auckland 0630
- Inaugurated: 1990

Website
- https://www.merc.org.nz/

Sir Peter Blake Marine Education & Recreation Centre (MERC) is a not for profit charity (Registration Number CC29903) based in Long Bay, Auckland, New Zealand. MERC offers marine-based environmental education and outdoor recreational experiences to schools, not-for-profit organisations, and business and corporate groups.

MERC can accommodate up to 85 people at any time for overnight stays and activities, and up to a total of 120 people per day. A day programme consists of 3 activities on the day and instruction is given between 9 am and 4 pm. There is scope to organise short duration, single day and multi-day courses, and these are specifically developed to meet the needs of each group. MERCs facilities have separate teacher/leader accommodation, multi-purpose hall, wheelchair access and large kitchen & dining facilities.

The Centre's mission statement is to provide life-changing marine environmental education and outdoor experiences for young New Zealanders.

== History ==
The Centre has been in operation since 1990. A group of local yachtsmen and teachers (Don St Clair Brown, Don Burfoot, Laurie Baxter, Ian Sage, Dr Ross Garrett and John Orams, responded to the vision of fellow yachtsman Dr. David Gray, that a centre be built on the present site which was designated “Conditional Use Reserve” land belonging to Takapuna City Council. In 1980 this site was littered with building debris, scraps of machinery and foundations of early buildings. These basic amenities had serviced the large Long Bay camping population as well as local holiday residents in their numerous beaches. There was a store with petrol pumps – started by Tom Vaughan about 1920 but taken over by Mr and Mrs Aston and demolished about 1950 (?), a butchery owned by Mr Lopes which later became a private beach, a holiday house built above the sea wall (1956) still tenanted in 1989.
