= Long Bay College =

School in Auckland

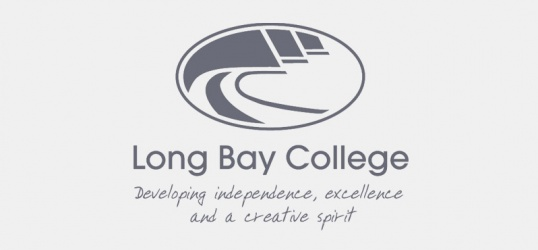

Location
- Ashley Avenue; Long Bay; Auckland 0742; New Zealand; 36.690653°S 174.741025°E

Information
- Funding type: State
- Motto: "Care. Create. Excel."
- Established: 1975
- Ministry of Education Institution no.: 27
- Principal: CJ Healey
- Years offered: 9–13
- Gender: Co-educational
- Enrolment: 1,960 (July 2026)
- Socio-economic decile: 10Z
- Website: www.longbaycollege.com

Long Bay College is a state co-educational secondary school located in Long Bay, a suburb of the North Shore in Auckland, New Zealand. The decile 10 school serves Years 9 to 13, and has 1,960 students as of July 2026. Christopher (CJ) Healey is the school's current principal. Long Bay College has a large zone boundary including the upper east coast bays, Brookfield, Albany, Albany heights, Redvale, Coatesville, Paremoremo and Brighams creek.

== History ==
Long Bay College first opened in 1975. The first principal of Long Bay College was Ian Sage, who then had a street directly leading from the school named after him - Ian Sage Avenue. Like most of New Zealand state secondary schools in the 1970s, the school was built to the S68 design, characterised by single-storey classroom blocks with masonry walls, low-pitched roofs with protruding clerestory windows, and internal open courtyards.

In 2017 a fire destroyed the college's woodwork block.

== Enrolment ==
On the August 2018 Education Review Office (ERO) review of the school, Long Bay College had 1408 students, including 154 international students. The school roll's gender composition was 51% male and 49% female, and its ethnic composition was 52% New Zealand European (Pākehā), 28% Other European, 8% Asian, 6% Māori, 2% Pacific Islanders, and 5% Other.

As of July 2026, Long Bay College has roll of 1,960 students, of which 155 (7.9%) identify as Māori.

As of 2026, the school has an Equity Index of 422, placing it amongst schools whose students have few socioeconomic barriers to achievement (roughly equivalent to deciles 8 and 9 under the former socio-economic decile system).

== Principals ==
- Mr CJ Healey – Current principal since 2017
- Mr Russell Brooke – 2008 to 2017
- Mrs Stephanie Norrie – 2000 to 2008
- Mr Derek Stubbs – 1992 to 2000
- Mr Ian Sage – Foundation Principal, 1974 to 1991

== Notable alumni ==
- Bridgette Armstrong – played for the New Zealand women's national football team, attended Long Bay College.
- Andrew Papas – member of the boyband Titanium.
- Paul Wiseman – spin bowler and played international cricket for New Zealand.
- Jason Hicks – footballer
- Tayla Alexander – singer

== Gallery ==
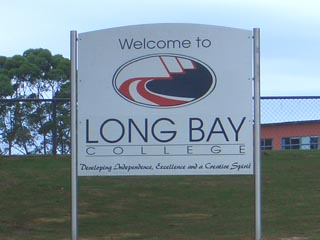
Long Bay College former sign and slogan

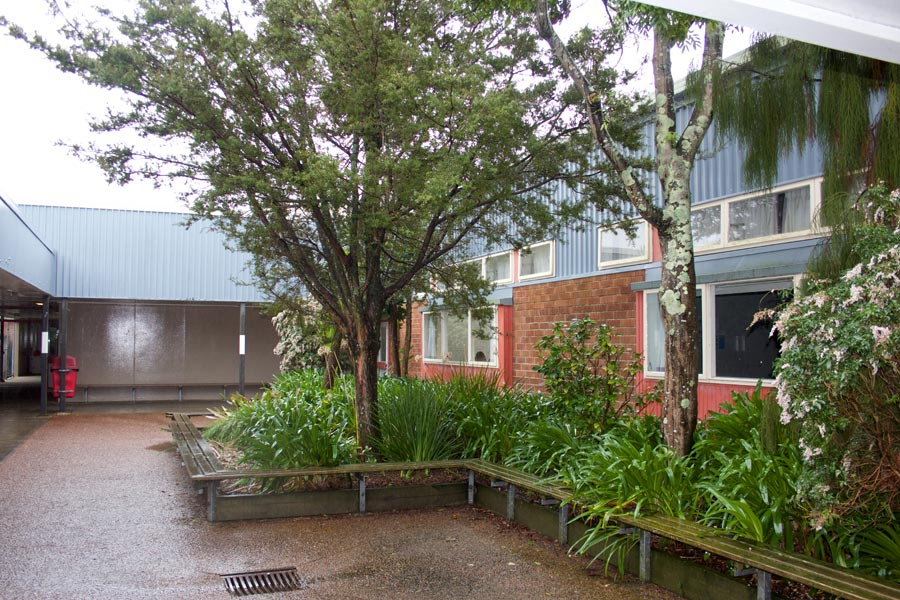
s68 design classroom block in LBC

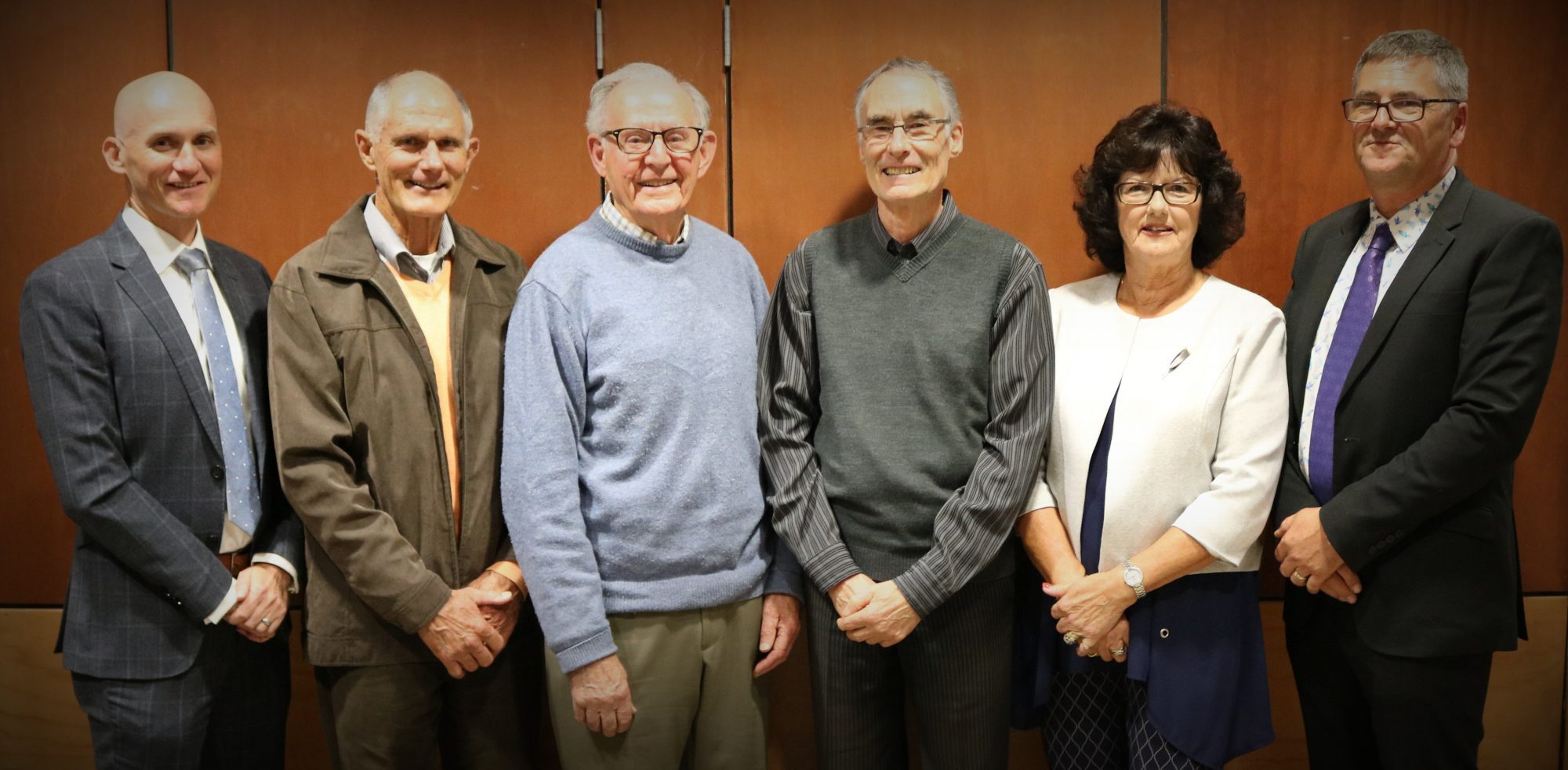
Current (L) and all former principals of the college
