= Songbird (Tayla Alexander album) =

Studio album by Tayla Alexander
- Released: November 2012
- Genre: Classical crossover
- Length: 43:07
- Label: Tayla Alexander

Songbird is the debut studio album from New Zealand classical crossover artist Tayla Alexander. Songbird was released in New Zealand in November 2012 and is available in both CD and digital download formats. Songbird saw Alexander become the youngest artist to appear on the New Zealand music charts.

== Track listing ==
1. Dark Waltz
2. Jerusalem
3. Amazing Grace
4. Songbird
5. Over the Rainbow
6. Danny Boy
7. O Holy Night
8. When A Child is Born
9. Ave Maria
10. Let It Be
11. Pie Jesu
12. Hine e Hine
13. Danny Boy (a cappella)
