= Long Bay Regional Park =

Park in Auckland, New Zealand

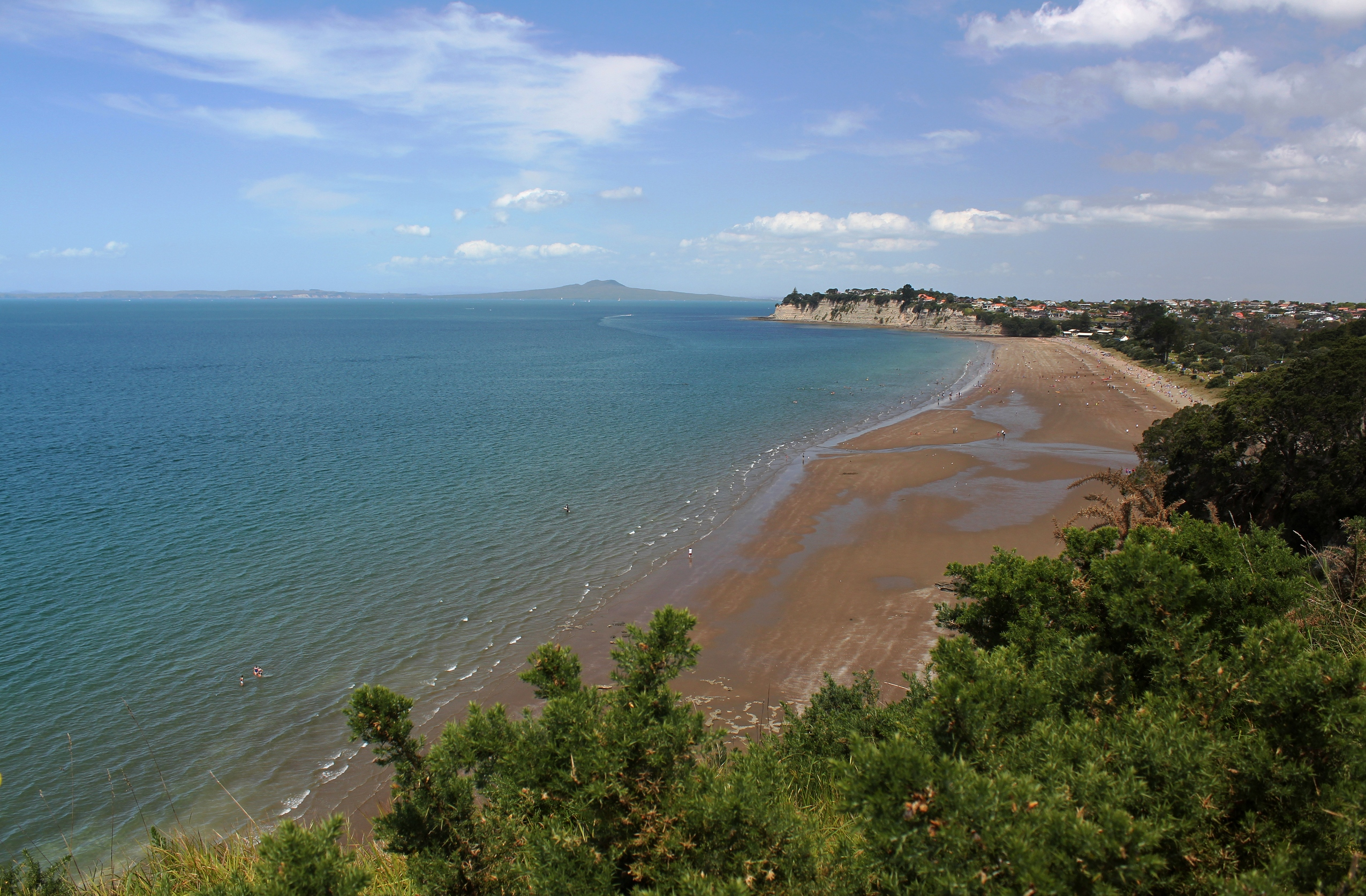
- Looking south towards Long Bay and Long Bay Regional Park

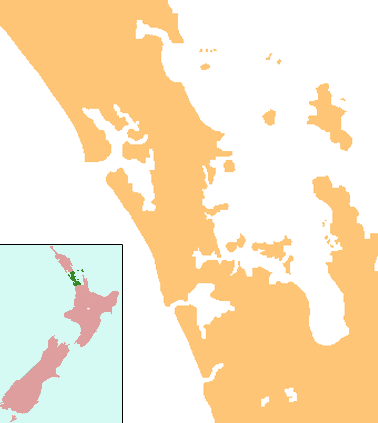
- Location within New Zealand Auckland
- Location: Hibiscus and Bays, Auckland, New Zealand
- Coordinates: 36.689543°S 174.7487933°E
- Area: 111 ha (270 acres)
- Operator: Auckland Council

Long Bay Regional Park is a regional park in Long Bay located in Auckland, New Zealand. It is located in the Hibiscus and Bays in the northern part of the city and is operated by Auckland Council.

== Geography ==
The cliffs of the park are formed by Waitemata Group sandstone. The northern section of the park features large pōhutukawa trees and regenerating native bush. The regional park is adjacent to the Long Bay-Okura Marine Reserve, a 980-hectare reserve extending from Karepiro Bay to Torbay.

The beach area is backed with sand dunes, which include restoration areas of pīngao and spinifex.

== History ==
The Vaughan family farmed the area from the 1860s. George Vaughan build a homestead on the spot in 1863. In 1965, the farmland was sold in order to become a regional park.

Areas of farmland above Long Bay Regional Park were protected from development by a court ruling in July 2008.
