= Long Bay-Okura Marine Reserve =

Protected area in New Zealand

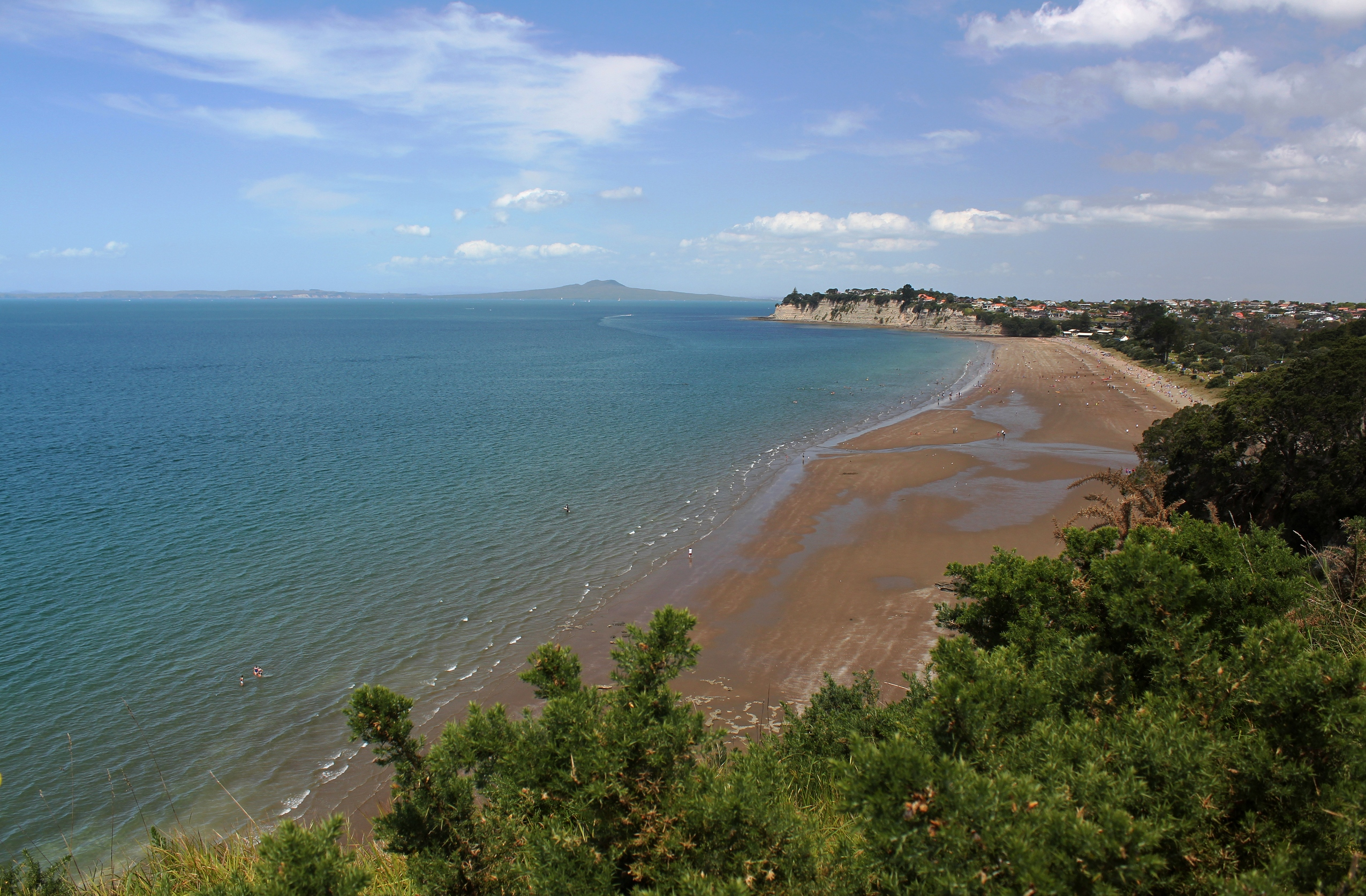
- Looking south over Long Bay
- Interactive map of Long Bay-Okura Marine Reserve
- Location: New Zealand
- Nearest city: Auckland
- Coordinates: 36°40′24″S 174°45′04″E
- Area: 980 ha (2,400 acres)
- Established: 1995
- Governing body: Department of Conservation

The Long Bay-Okura Marine Reserve is a 980-hectare (2,400-acre) protected area at Long Bay on the North Shore in the Auckland Region of New Zealand. It was created by Order in Council in 1995.

The shoreline of the Long Bay Regional Park and the Okura Estuary Scenic Reserve adjoins the marine reserve.

== See also ==
- Marine reserves of New Zealand
