= Ōkura River =

River in the Auckland Region, New Zealand

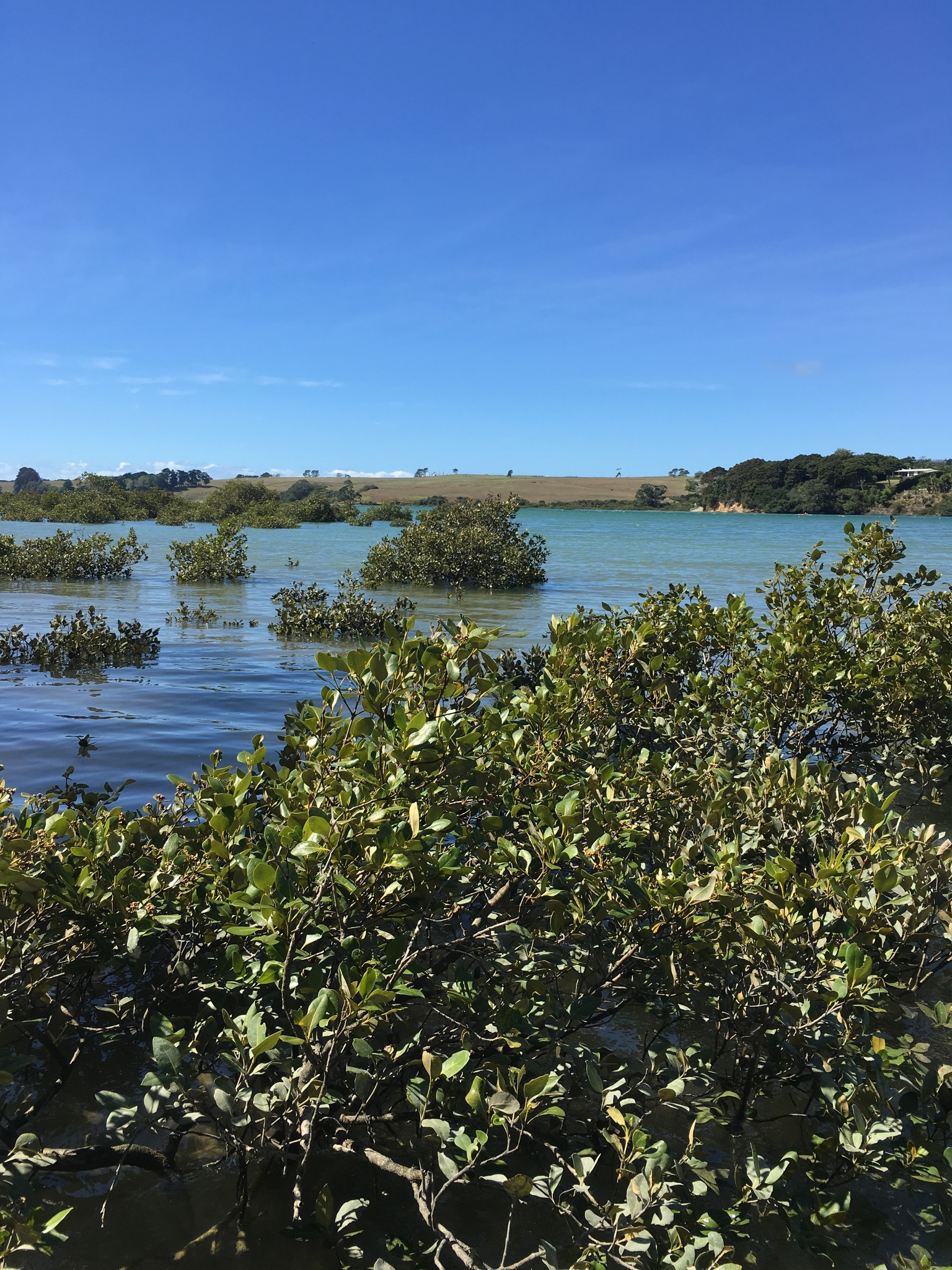
- Avicennia marina subsp. australasica on the Ōkura River

- Mouth of the Ōkura River Ōkura River (New Zealand)
- Route of the Ōkura River

Location
- Country: New Zealand
- Region: Auckland Region

Physical characteristics
- Source
  - coordinates: 36.70866°S 174.66706°E
- Mouth: Karepiro Bay
  - coordinates: 36.66382°S 174.73551°E

Basin features
- Progression: Ōkura River → Karepiro Bay → Hauraki Gulf / Tīkapa Moana

The Ōkura River, also known as the Ōkura Estuary, is a river in the north of the Auckland Region in the North Island of New Zealand. The river rises in the low hills to the south of Silverdale and flows into Karepiro Bay on the Hauraki Gulf / Tīkapa Moana. The river is extremely tidal with only a narrow channel being navigable by small craft at low tide. The area is popular for horse riding, riders wait till low tide and then ford the boating channel to ride the estuary and beaches on the northern side.

== Geography ==
The village of Ōkura is situated on the southern bank. The Long Bay-Okura Marine Reserve extends from the Ōkura River to the Weiti River. The sand banks (above high tide mark) in Karepiro Bay are Dotterel breeding areas, protected by DOC (Department of Conservation).

== History ==
The northern shore of the Ōkura River was traditionally known as Otaimaro, and was an extensive Māori settlement. In 1848, Henry Dacre and his father Captain Ranulph Dacre purchased the lands surrounding the river, creating the Weiti Station. Their house, the Dacre Cottage, was built circa 1855 from locally made bricks.

Development works with no limit to sediment dumping in the river are causing mass die off of shellfish in the river.
