= Karepiro Bay =

Bight in New Zealand

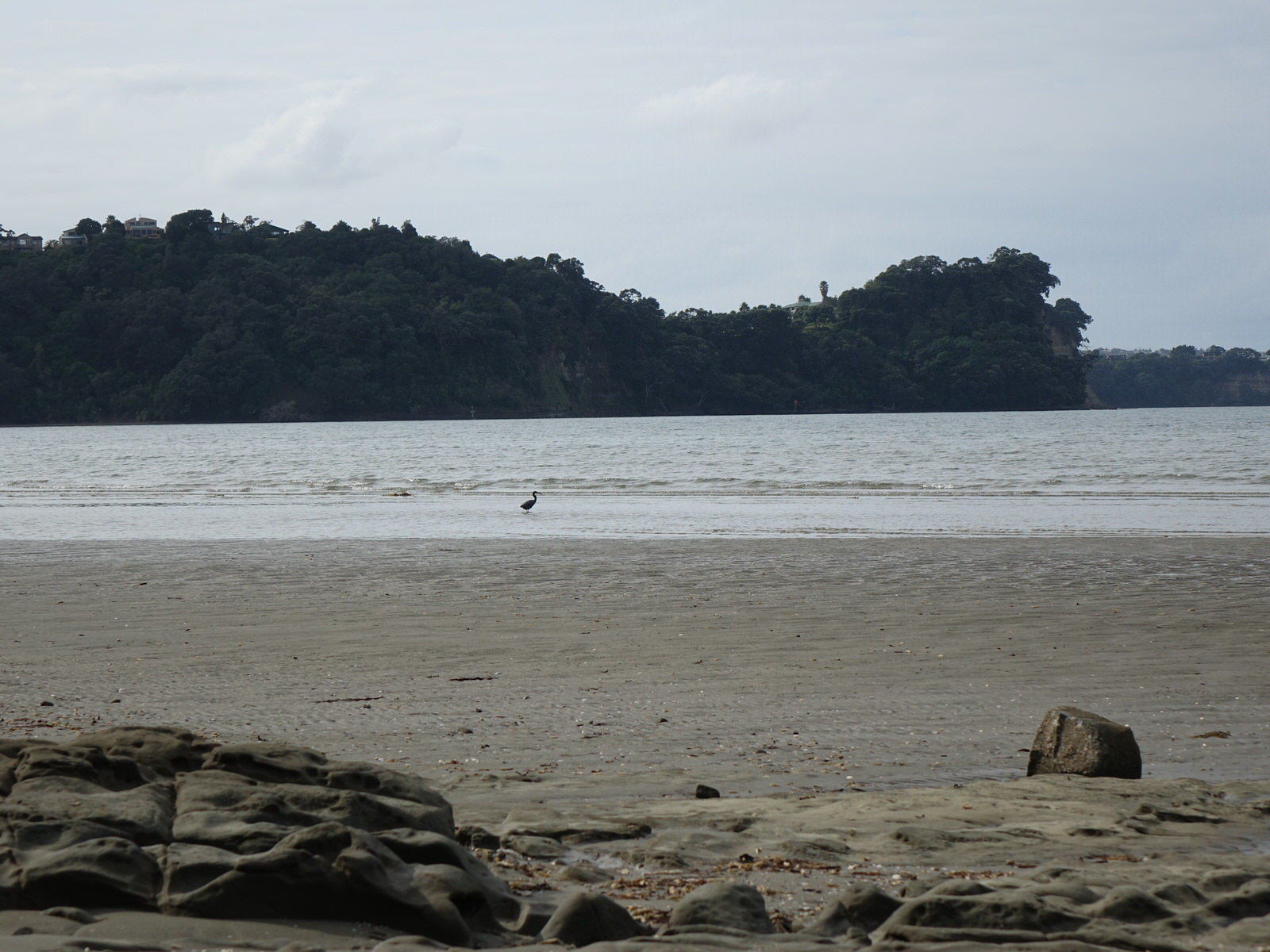

- Location within the Auckland Region
- Location: Auckland Region, New Zealand
- Coordinates: 36.654°S 174.737°E
- River sources: Weiti River, Ōkura River
- Ocean/sea sources: Hauraki Gulf / Tīkapa Moana, Pacific Ocean
- Settlements: Arkles Bay, Wade Heads, Weiti Station

Karepiro Bay is a bay of the Hauraki Gulf / Tīkapa Moana in the Auckland Region, New Zealand. It found between the Whangaparāoa Peninsula and North Shore, and is the mouth of the Weiti River and Ōkura River.

== Geography ==
Karepiro Bay is a bay of the Hauraki Gulf / Tīkapa Moana, found at the confluence of the Weiti River and Ōkura River, south of Whangaparāoa Peninsula and north of Long Bay. Dacre Point is a headland found at Karepiro Bay, which is the north headland of the Ōkura River, and the eastern headland of the Weiti River on the Whangaparāoa Peninsula is known as Toroa Point. Much of the bay is part of the Long Bay-Okura Marine Reserve. The bay features a large amount of sedimentation, which increased since the 1950s. The sands of the bay are home to the endangered New Zealand dotterel.

== History ==
The Tāmaki Māori name for the bay literally means "putrid ripples", and may be a reference to the smell of mudflats. The sandspits located at the bay are a traditionally significant site (wāhi tapu) called Te Ringa Kaha ō Manu. The Toroa Point headland was the location of Rahohara Pa, a defensive pā important to Te Kawerau ā Maki, especially Ngāti Kahu, and Ngāti Pāoa, due to the nearby shark fishing grounds, and Dacre Point is also a known pā site. The Karepiro Bay area is a concentrated area of archaeological sites, including shellfish middens, and terraces. The terraces north of Dacre Point indicate the area had been the site of terraced gardening. The kāinga located here was traditionally known by the name Otaimaro ("The Place of Taimaro"), after Te Kawerau ā Maki ancestor Taimaro, son of Tawhiakiterangi.

Karepiro Bay was the site of a battle during the Te Kawerau ā Maki conquest of the northern Auckland Region. During the Musket Wars, the Dacre Point pā was raided.

Karepiro Bay was visited by Jules Dumont d'Urville in 1827 aboard the Astrolabe, who named it Tofino Bay after the Spanish navigator and mathematician Vicente Tofiño de San Miguel. In 1848, Henry Dacre and his father Captain Ranulph Dacre purchased the lands surrounding the riverŌkura River, creating the Weiti Station. Their house, the Dacre Cottage, was built circa 1855 from locally made bricks, located on the shores of Karepiro Bay.

Long Bay-Okura Marine Reserve was established at Karepiro Bay and adjacent to Long Bay in 1995. Local residents have documented increased sedimentation in the 2010s leading to a loss of marine life, which led to protests in 2018.

== Bibliography ==
- Grover, Robin (2008). Why the Hibiscus? Place Names of the Hibiscus Coast. Silverdale Printing. ISBN 978-0-473-13484-6.
