= Schnapper Rock =

- Suburb
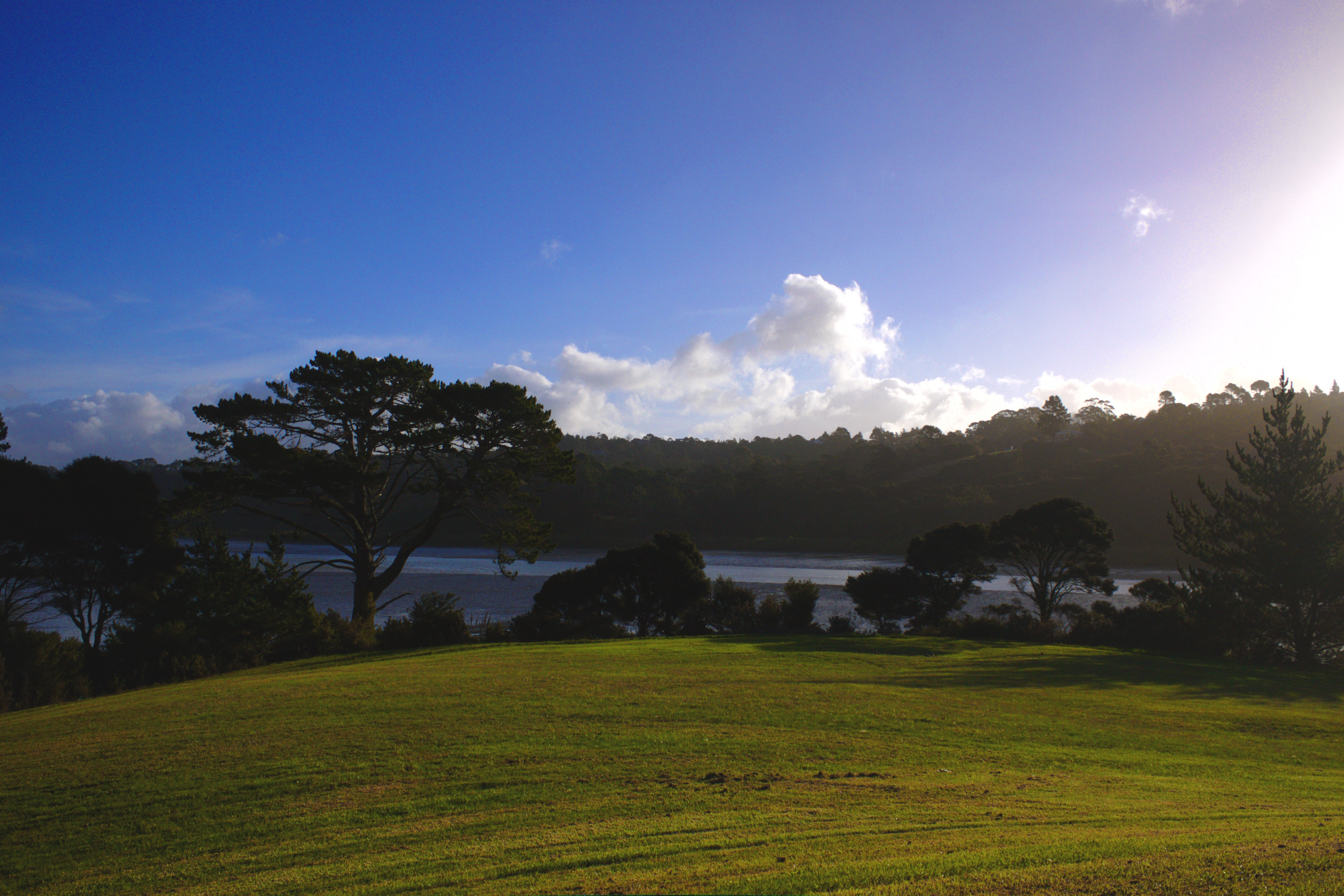
- North Shore Memorial Park
- Interactive map of Schnapper Rock
- Coordinates: 36.757°S 174.687°E
- Country: New Zealand
- City: Auckland
- Local authority: Auckland Council
- Electoral ward: Albany ward
- Local board: Upper Harbour Local Board

Area
  - Land: 221 ha (550 acres)

Population (June 2025)
  - Total: 4,130
  - Density: 1,870/km^{2} (4,840/sq mi)
- Postcode: 0632

Lucas Heights	Albany	Rosedale
(Lucas Creek)	Schnapper Rock	Unsworth Heights
Greenhithe	Greenhithe	Bayview

Schnapper Rock is a suburb of Auckland, New Zealand, on the North Shore. The suburb is governed by Auckland Council. The area was known for a gum digging hut used by early European settlers in the mid-19th century. North Shore Memorial Park was opened area in 1974, and the area developed into suburban housing in the early 2000s.

== Etymology ==
The name refers to the solid rock landing place used by early colonial residents of Auckland who travelled along Lucas Creek. The name schnapper is a variation of snapper, which people believed was the correct spelling in the mid-19th century, and refers to the good fishing found in the area.

== Geography ==
Schnapper Rock is an area of the northwestern North Shore in Auckland, New Zealand. It is located on the eastern bank of the upper reaches of the Lucas Creek, an estuarial arm of the Upper Waitematā Harbour. The creek forms the suburb's western border, while Albany Highway acts as the suburb's border to the east. Te Wharau Creek is a tributary of the Lucas Creek, which is found to the southwest of the suburb, between Schnapper Rock and Greenhithe. The highest point in the suburb is the hill to the south of the junction between Kittiwake Road and Schnapper Rock Road, which reaches a height of 85 metres (279 ft) above sea level.

Much of the Albany area is formed from Early Miocene Waitemata Group sandstone and mudstone, with areas of conglomerate rock called Albany Conglomerate. The banks of the Lucas Creek were historically kauri-dominated forests. By the mid-19th century, the area had developed into a mānuka and fern-dominated scrubland.

== History ==
=== Māori history ===
Māori settlement of the Auckland Region began around the 13th or 14th centuries. The North Shore was settled by Tāmaki Māori, including people descended from the Tainui migratory canoe and ancestors of figures such as Taikehu and Peretū. Many of the early Tāmaki Māori people of the North Shore identified as Ngā Oho, and the Lucas Creek has significance to modern iwi including Ngāti Manuhiri, Te Kawerau ā Maki and Ngāti Whātua o Kaipara. The poor clay soils of the area were not suitable for Māori traditional gardening techniques, but the creek was a good source for eels, crayfish and flounder. An ara (traditional path) connected Lucas Creek and the Okura River to the north, which led to Long Bay and the upper Hauraki Gulf. This was used as a portage, where waka could be hauled overland between the two bodies of water, Numerous archaeological sites are found on the banks of the Lucas Creek, because of its importance as a transportation node.

The warrior Maki migrated from the Kāwhia Harbour to his ancestral home in the Auckland Region, likely sometime in the 17th century. Maki conquered and unified many the Tāmaki Māori tribes as Te Kawerau ā Maki, including those of the North Shore. After Maki's death, his sons settled different areas of his lands, creating new hapū. His younger son Maraeariki settled the North Shore and Hibiscus Coast, who based himself at the head of the Ōrewa River. Maraeariki's daughter Kahu succeeded him, and she is the namesake of the North Shore, Te Whenua Roa o Kahu ("The Greater Lands of Kahu"), Many of the iwi of the North Shore, including Ngāti Manuhiri, Ngāti Maraeariki, Ngāti Kahu, Ngāti Poataniwha, Ngāi Tai ki Tāmaki and Ngāti Whātua, can trace their lineage to Kahu.

By the first half of the 19th century, the mouth of the Lucas Creek to the southwest of Albany was one of the most densely settled areas of the North Shore by Tāmaki Māori peoples. During the early 1820s, most Māori of the North Shore fled for the Waikato or Northland due to the threat of war parties during the Musket Wars. When Tāmaki Māori returned in greater numbers to the Auckland Region in the mid-1830s, Te Kawerau ā Maki focused settlement at Te Henga / Bethells Beach.

=== European settlement ===
The Schnapper Rock area was a part of the Mahurangi Block, which was purchased by the New Zealand Government in 1841. While kauri logging was one of the first industries in the area, the supply of kauri was exhausted by the early 1840s. By the late 1840s, kauri gum digging had become a more prominent industry for the Lucas Creek area. Itinerant gum diggers would scour the area for kauri resin to sell at stores, including one located at Schnapper Rock, which was established in the late 1840s. By 1864, the area began to be subdivided into smaller lots for farmers and residents.

The area remained rural until the mid-20th century. After the opening of the Auckland Harbour Bridge in 1959, larger farms began to be subdivided into smaller farmlets. The semi-rural character of the area remained until the 1990s.

North Shore Memorial Park was opened in 1974. It is a cemetery run by Auckland Council sited on 36 hectares (90 acres).

The first references to Schnapper Rock as a suburb come from the early 2000s; prior to this it was considered a part of Albany. The name was name chosen by property developers for the area, and already had strong associations with the North Shore Memorial Park and crematorium. It was officially recognised as a suburb by the New Zealand Gazetteer and North Shore City in 2007.

== Local government ==
From 1876 until 1954, the area was administered by the Waitemata County, a large rural county north and west of the city of Auckland. On 1 August 1974, the Waitemata County was dissolved, and Schnapper Rock became a rural area incorporated into Takapuna City. In 1989, Schnapper Rock was merged into the North Shore City. North Shore City was amalgamated into Auckland Council in November 2010.

Within the Auckland Council, Schnapper Rock is a part of the Upper Harbour local government area governed by the Upper Harbour Local Board. It is a part of the Albany ward, which elects two councillors to the Auckland Council.

== Demographics ==
Schnapper Rock covers 2.21 km^{2} (0.85 sq mi) and had an estimated population of 4,130 as of June 2025, with a population density of 1,869 people per km^{2}.

Historical population
Year	Pop.	±% p.a.
2006	1,431	—
2013	3,699	+14.53%
2018	3,939	+1.27%
2023	3,867	−0.37%

Schnapper Rock had a population of 3,867 in the 2023 New Zealand census, a decrease of 72 people (−1.8%) since the 2018 census, and an increase of 168 people (4.5%) since the 2013 census. There were 1,932 males, 1,926 females and 9 people of other genders in 1,131 dwellings. 3.6% of people identified as LGBTIQ+. The median age was 36.6 years (compared with 38.1 years nationally). There were 735 people (19.0%) aged under 15 years, 855 (22.1%) aged 15 to 29, 1,941 (50.2%) aged 30 to 64, and 330 (8.5%) aged 65 or older.

People could identify as more than one ethnicity. The results were 41.3% European (Pākehā); 4.4% Māori; 1.6% Pasifika; 55.2% Asian; 3.4% Middle Eastern, Latin American and African New Zealanders (MELAA); and 2.2% other, which includes people giving their ethnicity as "New Zealander". English was spoken by 88.0%, Māori language by 0.9%, Samoan by 0.2%, and other languages by 48.9%. No language could be spoken by 1.6% (e.g. too young to talk). New Zealand Sign Language was known by 0.3%. The percentage of people born overseas was 58.9, compared with 28.8% nationally.

Religious affiliations were 27.1% Christian, 2.4% Hindu, 1.9% Islam, 0.2% Māori religious beliefs, 2.5% Buddhist, 0.2% New Age, 0.1% Jewish, and 1.3% other religions. People who answered that they had no religion were 58.0%, and 6.5% of people did not answer the census question.

Of those at least 15 years old, 1,050 (33.5%) people had a bachelor's or higher degree, 1,191 (38.0%) had a post-high school certificate or diploma, and 666 (21.3%) people exclusively held high school qualifications. The median income was $49,400, compared with $41,500 nationally. 594 people (19.0%) earned over $100,000 compared to 12.1% nationally. The employment status of those at least 15 was that 1,752 (55.9%) people were employed full-time, 432 (13.8%) were part-time, and 84 (2.7%) were unemployed.

== Bibliography ==
- Harris, Alison; Stevenson, Robert (2002). Once There Were Green Fields: the Story of Albany, New Zealand. Albany. ISBN 0-473-08160-1. OCLC 62526122. Wikidata Q123424599.
- King, R. E. (1984), Tauhinu: a History of Greenhithe, OCLC 37242212, Wikidata Q123416976
- Taua, Te Warena (2009). "He Kohikohinga Kōrero mō Hikurangi". In Macdonald, Finlay; Kerr, Ruth (eds.). West: The History of Waitakere. Random House. pp. 23–48. ISBN 9781869790080.
- Verran, David (2010), The North Shore: An Illustrated History, North Shore: Random House, OL 33434370W, Wikidata Q120520385
