= Oruamo or Hellyers Creek =

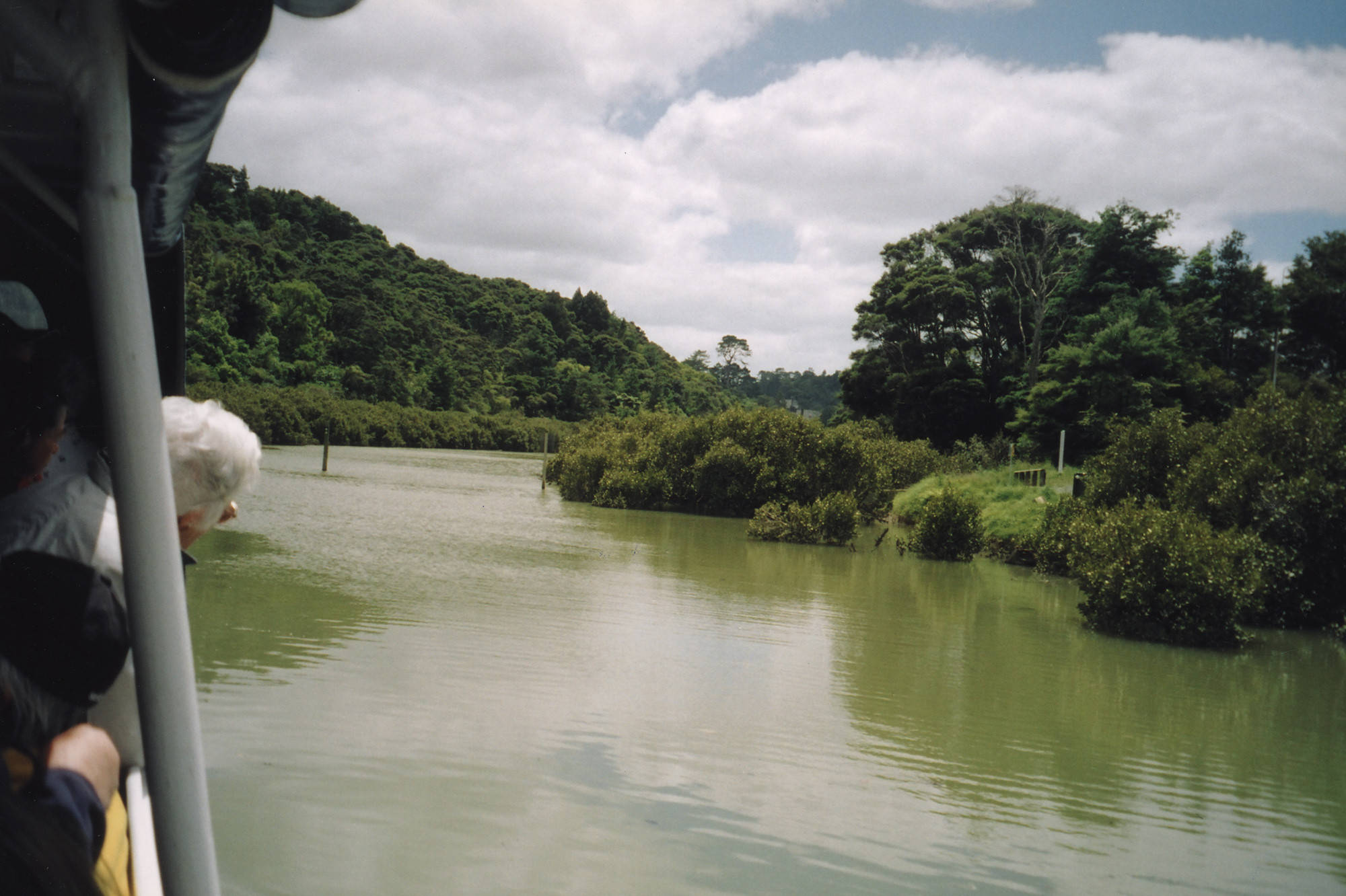
- Oruamo or Hellyers Creek in 2003

- Mouth of Oruamo or Hellyers Creek Oruamo or Hellyers Creek (New Zealand)
- Route of Oruamo or Hellyers Creek
- Native name: Ōruāmō

Location
- Country: New Zealand
- Region: Auckland Region

Physical characteristics
- Source: Unsworth Heights
  - coordinates: 36.76362°S 174.7142°E
- Mouth: Upper Waitematā Harbour
  - coordinates: 36.78801°S 174.67806°E

Basin features
- Progression: Oruamo or Hellyers Creek → Upper Waitematā Harbour → Waitematā Harbour → Hauraki Gulf
- Tributaries
  - left: Kaipātiki Creek

Oruamo or Hellyers Creek is a stream and tidal estuary of Upper Waitematā Harbour in the Auckland Region of New Zealand's North Island. It flows through the western North Shore.

== Geography ==
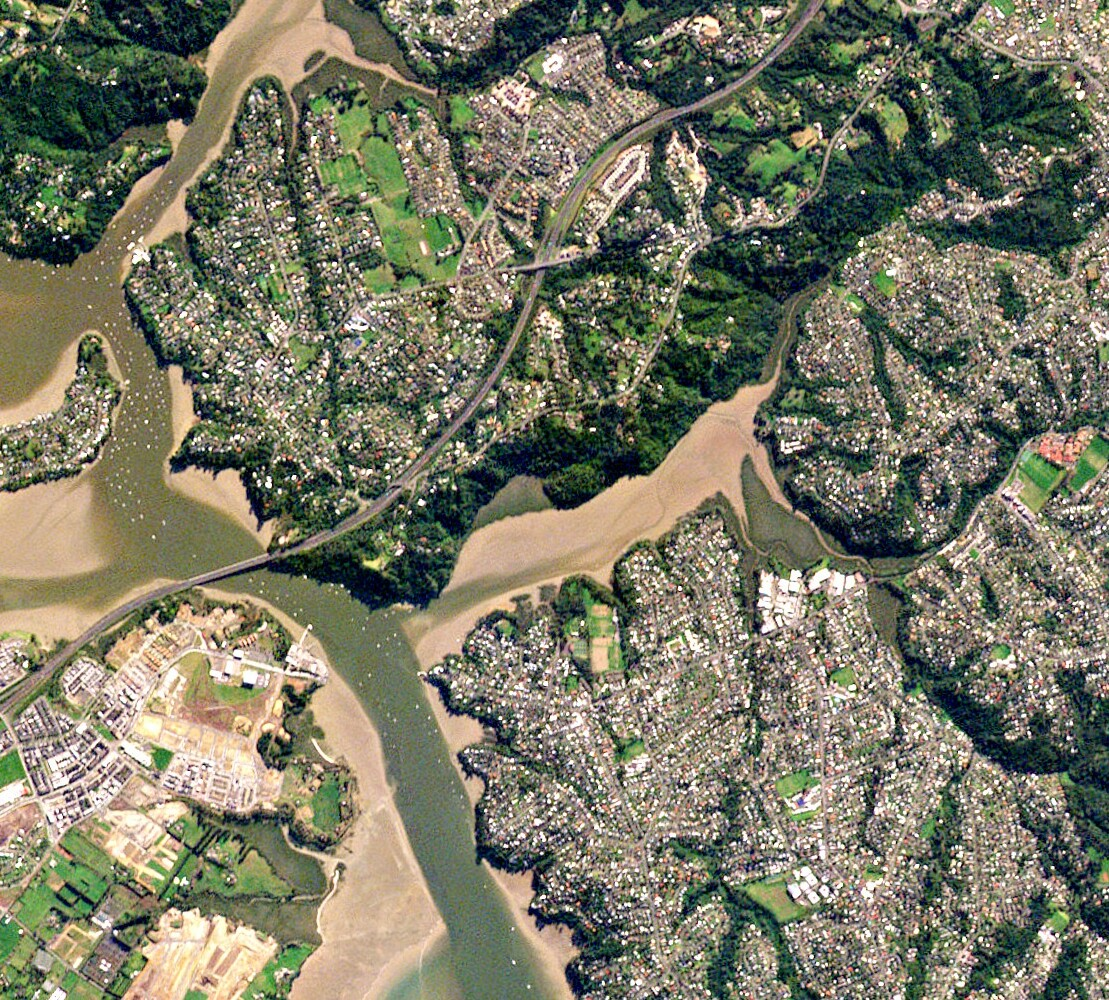
Satellite view of Oruamo or Hellyers Creek in 2016

Oruamo or Hellyers Creek is an arm of the Upper Waitematā Harbour. The creek begins as a freshwater stream, flowing south-west from Albany Highway. The freshwater section is also known as the Waikahikatoa Stream, or the Lignite Stream. A major tributary to the creek is the Kaipātiki Creek, which flows north-west through Birkenhead and Birkdale. Sunset Bay is found on the southern shores of the estuarial mouth of the creek.

== History ==
The traditional Tāmaki Māori name for the creek, Ōruāmō is a contraction of Ō-rua-ā-Mōkai-ō-Kahu ("The Lair of Mōkai ō Kahu"), referring to the guardian taniwha associated with Kahumatamomoe of the Arawa migratory canoe. The original version of the name may have been Oru-ā-Mōkai-ō-Kahu/Oruāmō, a reference to the (17m) deep hole, or oru, at the confluence of the creek and main channel that was the lair of the taniwha. A rock at the mouth of the creek, Te Ure tū ā Hape, recalls the visit of Rakatāura, the tohunga of the Tainui migratory canoe. Archaeological sites show that Oruamo was an important transportation node for the North Shore area. In the first half of the 19th century, the headlands of Oruamo and Lucas Creek to the north were settled by Te Kawerau ā Maki, and were some of the most densely settled areas of the North Shore by Tāmaki Māori. Other traditional names for sites at Oruamo include Ngā Ngutuko ("The Pouted Lips"), referring to the entrance to the creek, Te Wharauakae ("The Shed of Kae"), the bay east of Greenhithe referring to a Te Kawerau ancestor who was killed here, and Te Okoaratanga, the headland to the east of Greenhithe. During the 1820s, most of the Te Kawerau people in the area fled for temporary refuge during the events of the Musket Wars, returning to the Waitākere Ranges and Te Henga / Bethells Beach years later.

The creek is a traditional source of shellfish, and archaeological middens have been found on the shores of the Kaipātiki Creek.

The southern shores of the creek were one of the earliest areas sold to European settlers. William Webster purchased 320 acres of land in 1837 from Ngāti Whātua chiefs Nanihi and Tuire. Webster onsold the land to Thomas Hellyer, who established a kauri mill and brewery on the property, which he renamed The Retreat. The Retreat was one of the first permanent wooden houses constructed on the North Shore, and the site was popular with sailors, who would visit for fresh water and beer. After Thomas Hellyer was found dead in 1841, the business folded. The land was purchased by William Crush Daldy in 1845, after which the creek was briefly known as Daldy's Creek.

During the early colonial era, wharfs on the creek were the main means of transportation for communities of the western North Shore, such as Greenhithe, Beach Haven and Glenfield (then known as Mayfield).

The eastern shores of the creek rapidly developed into suburban housing in the 1960s, after the completion of the Auckland Harbour Bridge. This population explosion led the Waitemata County Council to announce plans for a landfill in 1969, in reclaimed land of Oruamo or Hellyers Creek. The plans were widely protested by residents, and were scarpered after the New Zealand Airforce, who insisted that no landfills could be located within one nautical mile of the RNZAF Base at Whenuapai or the RNZAF Station Hobsonville.

Oruamo or Hellyers Creek forms the border between the Kaipātiki and Upper Harbour local board areas.

== Bibliography ==
- Rounthwaite, Valerie (1989), The Story of Rural Glenfield, Takapuna: Takapuna City Council, OCLC 37482407, Wikidata Q123499466
- Verran, David (2010), The North Shore: An Illustrated History, North Shore: Random House, OL 33434370W, Wikidata Q120520385
