= Upper Harbour =

Upper Harbour may refer to these various places in New Zealand:

- Upper Harbour Bridge
- Upper Harbour Local Board
- Upper Harbour Motorway
- Upper Harbour (New Zealand electorate)
- Upper Harbour Primary School
- Upper Waitematā Harbour, also known as the Upper Harbour
