= Whenuapai =

- Suburb
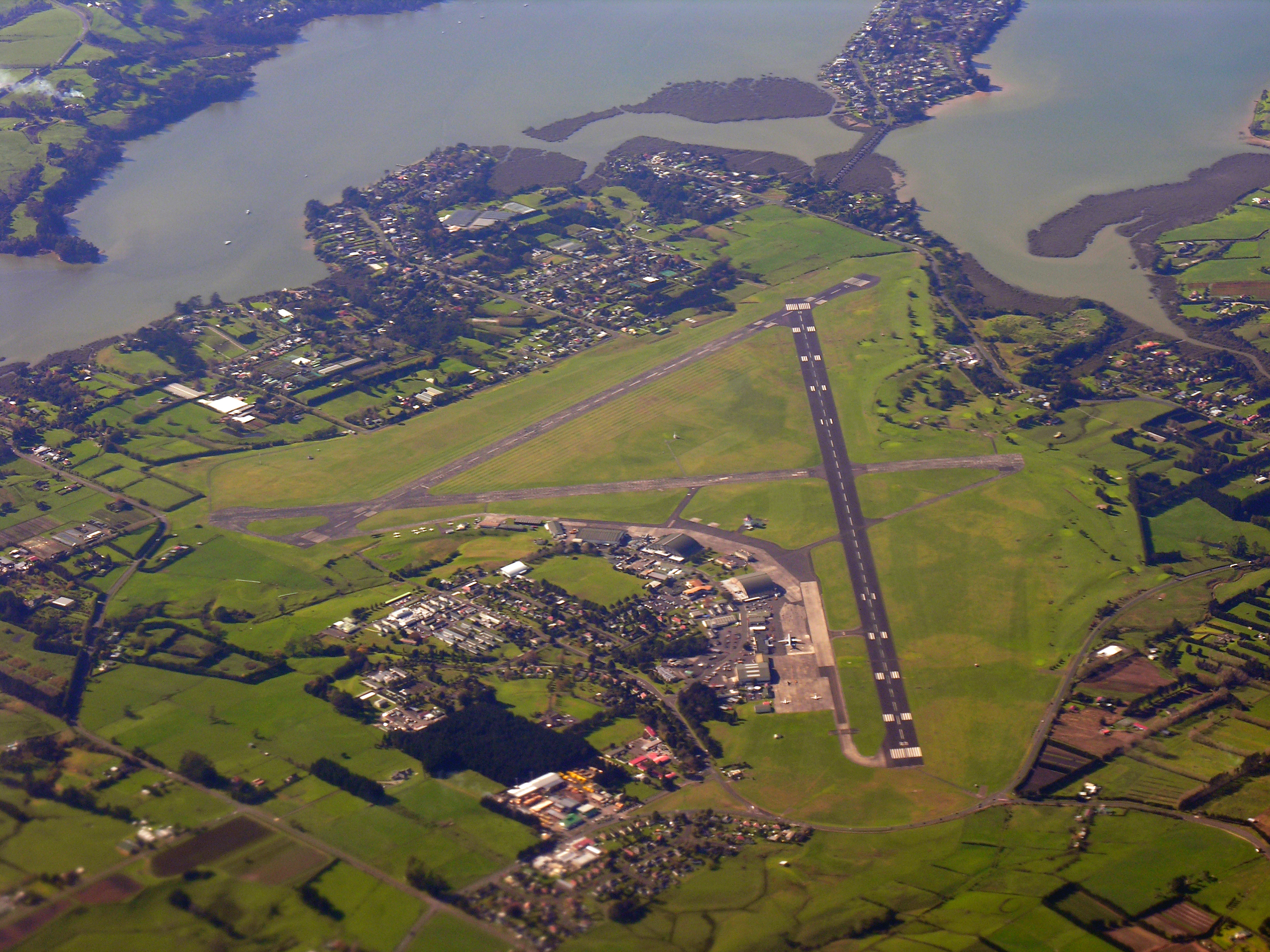
- Aerial view of Whenuapai Airbase, looking eastward
- Interactive map of Whenuapai
- Coordinates: 36.7898°S 174.6303°E
- Country: New Zealand
- City: Auckland
- Local authority: Auckland Council
- Electoral ward: Albany ward; Waitākere ward
- Local board: Upper Harbour Local Board; Henderson-Massey Local Board

Area
  - Land: 1,703 ha (4,210 acres)

Population (June 2025)
  - Total: 7,180
  - Density: 422/km^{2} (1,090/sq mi)
- Postcode: 0618
- Airports: RNZAF Base Auckland

Riverhead	Pāremoremo	Greenhithe
Kumeū	Whenuapai	Hobsonville
Westgate	Massey	West Harbour

Whenuapai is a suburb and aerodrome located in northwestern Auckland, in the North Island of New Zealand. It is located on the shore of the Upper Waitematā Harbour, 15 kilometres to the northwest of Auckland's city centre. It is one of the landing points for the Southern Cross telecommunications Cables.

== Etymology ==
The name Whenuapai was coined by resident Theophilus Wake, a Māori language name meaning "good land". When Wake settled in the area in 1911, he chose the name Waimarie, meaning "calm waters". As the settlement grew, Wake applied for a post office to be established for the community. The post office service required a different name, due to another location named Waimarie, and Wake chose the name Whenuapai instead. The name Whenuapai was officially adopted on 23 March 1914, and the first references to Whenuapai in newspapers can be found from May 1914.

The traditional Te Kawerau ā Maki name for the area is Rarawaru, which is the name of the stream that flows north from Whenuapai to the Upper Waitematā Harbour.

== History ==
The poor soil quality around the Wallace and Waiarohia inlets dissuaded permanent settlement of the area until after European farming techniques were able to improve the soil quality.

In c.1903 the Ockleston's established a pottery located at the tip of the Waiarohia inlet where the Whenuapai rubbish tip is now located. The pottery ceased production in 1914, after the Ockleston's business had been bought out and merge with Clark's at Limeburners Bay in Hobsonville. The bricks The area was settled by pacifist Theophilus Wake in 1911. Wake was joined by other like-minded pacifists in the 1910s, and a community developed at Whenuapai.

=== RNZAF facilities ===
In 1938 under the Public Works Act, the New Zealand Government several hundred acres of land at Whenuapai, in order to create a base for Wellington bomber, prior to the onset of World War II.

Post World War II Auckland became a centre for RNZAF transport and maritime squadrons. From 1945 to 1965 Whenuapai was also Auckland's civil international airport. Whenuapai and Hobsonville bases were integrated in 1965 to form RNZAF Base Auckland. Hobsonville is now closed, with the RNZAF continuing to lease a few remaining facilities.

Today, with a personnel strength of around 1100, Base Auckland is the home for:

- No. 5 Squadron (P-3K2 Orion)
- No. 6 Squadron (SH-2G(I) Seasprite)
- No. 40 Squadron (C-130 Hercules and Boeing 757)
- RNZAF Parachute Training and Support Unit,
- RNZAF Security Forces Military Working Dog Training School
- RNZAF Aviation Medicine Unit.
- RNZAF Operations Squadron
- RNZAF Police

=== Whenuapai Airport 1945–65 ===
In 1945 the government made the RNZAF Station at Whenuapai available for civil airline operations on a temporary basis and with RNZAF activities to take precedence. That "temporary basis" lasted twenty years and the RNZAF had to give up their two smaller hangars and move to the north apron of their own airfield. In the 1940s Whenuapai was one of three aerodromes in the country with sealed runways, the others being Paraparaumu and Ohakea. Whenuapai was adopted as the international airport for Auckland, despite the benefits of the location of the Mangere Aerodrome, due to its ongoing use by the RNZAF meaning there were no additional costs for the Auckland City Council.

For a short time, Auckland had three aerodromes—the seaplane aerodrome at Mechanics Bay where Tasman Empire Airways Limited (TEAL) operated from 1940–54; the city's domestic airport—at the then small grass airstrip at Māngere, on the site of the present Auckland Airport; and weekly Pan American and British Commonwealth Pacific Airlines (the latter's services originally operated by Australian National Airways) services with DC-4s from Whenuapai. Also immediately post-war; the RNZAF operated many of the civil services while National Airways Corporation (NAC) was being organised, and to add to the confusion; some of Auckland's domestic services departed from Whenuapai as well. Hills adjacent to the Whenuapai site limited the ability of new generation aircraft to use the site.

In 1947 the government closed Māngere to all but light aircraft citing safety concerns, and NAC moved to Whenuapai. (At the same time, the government closed Wellington's Rongotai Airport, for the same reasons, and NAC had to move to Paraparaumu, 35 miles from the city.)

In addition to domestic services, NAC flew a DC-3 weekly to Norfolk Island from Whenuapai, and fortnightly on a route that took a week each way; Whenuapai—Norfolk Island—Nadi—Apia—Tongatapu—Aitutaki—Rarotonga. The Norfolk Island service continued until 1955 when Qantas, chartered to TEAL, took over the route with a DC-4; and the Pacific Service was handed over to TEAL in 1952.

The next major development at Whenuapai was in May 1954, when British Commonwealth Pacific Airlines was wound up, its DC-6s given to TEAL, and that airline sold all except two of its flying boats and moved to Whenuapai. It kept one Solent in reserve and sent the other to Suva to fly the leg to Tahiti, which didn't get a landplane airport until 1960. The first part of the Coral Route was then operated by DC-6 from Whenuapai to Nadi.

Airport diagram for 1956

Despite problems with its runway Whenuapai continued as Auckland's international airport through the 1950s. In 1960 the longest runway was 6590 feet (6664 ft a few years later) which allowed BOAC Comet flights, but larger jet airliners such as the DC-8 and the B707 demanded a new international airport and work on Auckland Airport began. The first international flight from Auckland Airport was on 24 November 1965 and it officially opened on Anniversary Weekend (29–31 January), 1966 after which Whenuapai Airport reverted to purely military use as an Aerodrome.

=== Reverting to Military Aerodrome and recent developments ===
The operational tempo at Whenuapai continues at the level it has been at for the last forty years, although the closure of the adjacent Hobsonville base has seen the departure of rotary operations (primarily the UH1H Iroquois) to RNZAF Base Ohakea. With the budget for moving the base to Ohakea exceeding one billion dollars, the previously scheduled closure by the New Zealand Labour government (originally by 2007, then 2010 or, at latest, 2014) was cancelled by the incoming National government of 2008. There were suggestions that it be used as Auckland's second international Airport. Reasons put forward in favour were that more people in the Auckland region already lived closer to the aerodrome than to Māngere Airport and that it was projected that within 15 years Whenuapai would be closer for more than a million Aucklanders.

The three local authorities that comprised the north west sector of the Auckland Region, Rodney District Council, North Shore City Council and Waitakere City Council all favoured the second airport concept at one time or another and at least one poll, by the Waitakere City Council in late 2006, indicated 77% support and 22% opposition by the public.

However, in the local body elections of October 2007, the pro-airport North Shore City mayor was defeated by an anti-airport mayoral candidate with indications that the airport issue was the most important of factors considered by voters.

Subsequently, North Shore City Council reversed support for a Whenuapai International Airport while the Waitakere City Council remained in favour. In 2010, all councils were amalgamated into the new Auckland Council and therefore support for a commercial airport was dropped. The proposal had also been opposed by the government.

==== Airlines of Whenuapai (Chronological Order) ====
Royal New Zealand Air Force (Civil Operations)	1945–47
Pan American World Airways	1946–65
British Commonwealth Pacific Airlines (BCPA)	1947–53
New Zealand National Airways Corporation (NAC)	1947–65
Canadian Pacific Airlines	1952–65
Tasman Empire Airways Limited (TEAL)	1954–65
Transports Aeriens Intercontinentaux (TAI)	1957–63
South Pacific Airlines of New Zealand (SPANZ)	1960–65
Qantas Empire Airways (QANTAS)	1961–65†
British Overseas Airways Corporation (BOAC)	1963–65

† This was as scheduled operations on its own account. As QANTAS owned half of TEAL until 1961; before then its aircraft only appeared at Whenuapai if chartered by TEAL, or if its aircraft were chartered for a trip across to New Zealand, although it did occasionally appear at Whenuapai between 1956–61 with its Super Constellations at peak traffic times.

== Economy ==
The initial main source of income in Whenuapai came from logging kauri. After the trees were cut down gum diggers arrived. The gum diggers sold their gum at Sinton's store at Brigham's Creek or in Hobsonville. After the gum diggers had left most land owners converted their property to pasture or for growing crops.

Tobacco was grown as a crop in Whenuapai and by 1929 more than 120,000 pounds of tobacco were produced at Whenuapai and nearby Riverhead. By 1940 however tobacco production would cease and Motueka became the main area for tobacco cultivation. This was due to increasing taxes and increasing labour costs making tobacco cultivation unprofitable.

== Demographics ==
Whenuapai statistical area, which includes Herald Island, covers 17.03 km^{2} (6.58 sq mi) and had an estimated population of 7,180 as of June 2025, with a population density of 422 people per km^{2}.

Historical population
Year	Pop.	±% p.a.
2006	3,639	—
2013	3,570	−0.27%
2018	3,696	+0.70%
2023	6,300	+11.26%
The 2006 population is for a larger area of 19.68 km^{2} Source:

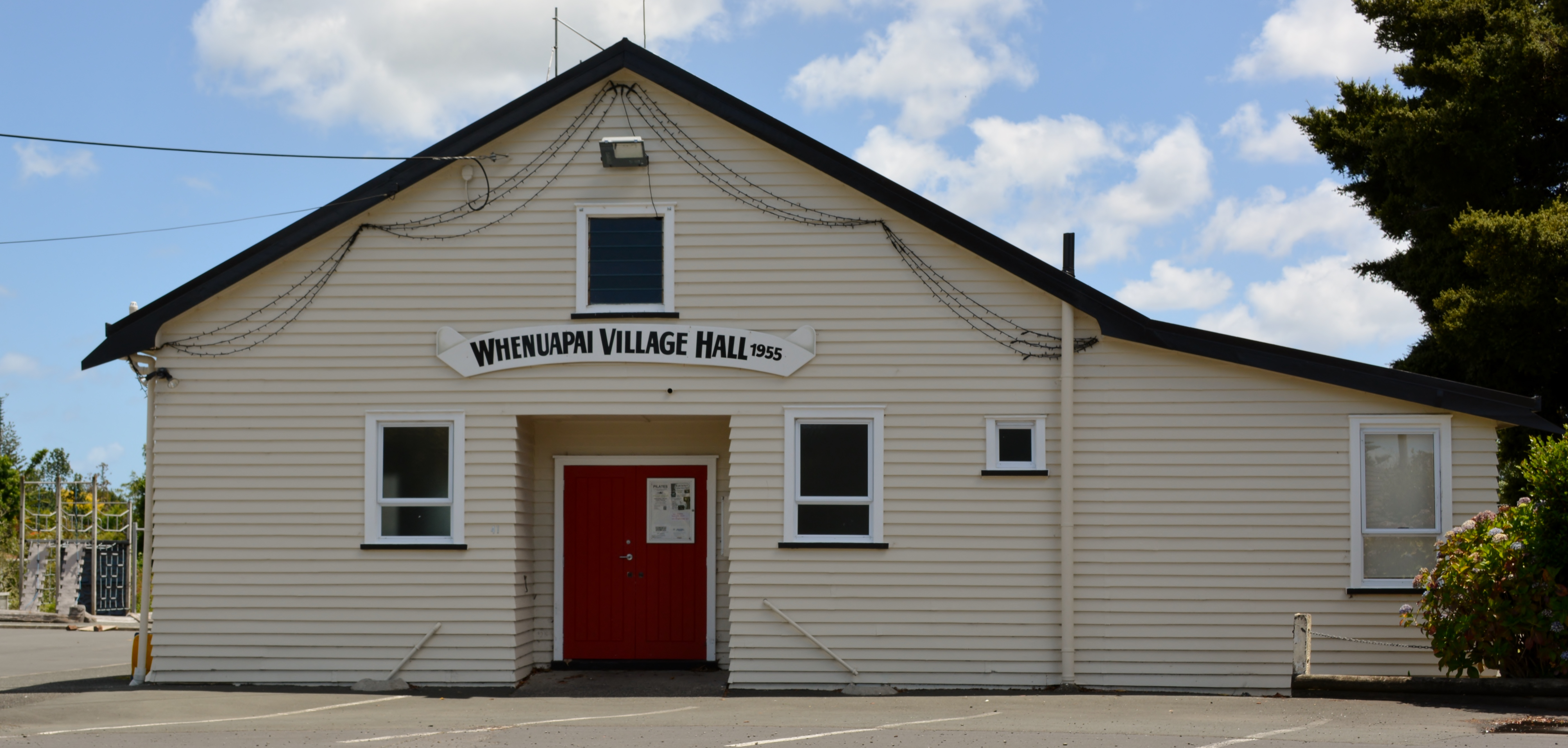
Whenuapai Village Hall

Whenuapai had a population of 6,300 in the 2023 New Zealand census, an increase of 2,604 people (70.5%) since the 2018 census, and an increase of 2,730 people (76.5%) since the 2013 census. There were 3,177 males, 3,105 females and 21 people of other genders in 2,091 dwellings. 3.2% of people identified as LGBTIQ+. The median age was 33.5 years (compared with 38.1 years nationally). There were 1,257 people (20.0%) aged under 15 years, 1,329 (21.1%) aged 15 to 29, 3,144 (49.9%) aged 30 to 64, and 573 (9.1%) aged 65 or older.

People could identify as more than one ethnicity. The results were 62.3% European (Pākehā); 12.6% Māori; 6.9% Pasifika; 30.1% Asian; 2.3% Middle Eastern, Latin American and African New Zealanders (MELAA); and 2.5% other, which includes people giving their ethnicity as "New Zealander". English was spoken by 93.3%, Māori language by 2.2%, Samoan by 1.3%, and other languages by 24.9%. No language could be spoken by 3.4% (e.g. too young to talk). New Zealand Sign Language was known by 0.6%. The percentage of people born overseas was 35.5, compared with 28.8% nationally.

Religious affiliations were 28.0% Christian, 4.0% Hindu, 2.4% Islam, 0.4% Māori religious beliefs, 1.5% Buddhist, 0.3% New Age, and 1.7% other religions. People who answered that they had no religion were 55.5%, and 6.1% of people did not answer the census question.

Of those at least 15 years old, 1,461 (29.0%) people had a bachelor's or higher degree, 2,319 (46.0%) had a post-high school certificate or diploma, and 882 (17.5%) people exclusively held high school qualifications. The median income was $60,700, compared with $41,500 nationally. 1,017 people (20.2%) earned over $100,000 compared to 12.1% nationally. The employment status of those at least 15 was that 3,240 (64.2%) people were employed full-time, 585 (11.6%) were part-time, and 90 (1.8%) were unemployed.

Individual statistical areas
Name	Area (km^{2})	Population	Density (per km^{2})	Dwellings	Median age	Median income
Whenuapai	12.75	5,052	396	1,698	34.0 years	$61,300
Whenuapai West	4.27	1,248	292	390	32.3 years	$58,200
New Zealand					38.1 years	$41,500

== Climate ==
Climate data for Whenuapai Aero (1991–2020 normals, extremes 1945–present)
Month	Jan	Feb	Mar	Apr	May	Jun	Jul	Aug	Sep	Oct	Nov	Dec	Year
Record high °C (°F)	30.3 (86.5)	32.4 (90.3)	29.4 (84.9)	27.0 (80.6)	23.9 (75.0)	21.6 (70.9)	21.0 (69.8)	21.2 (70.2)	22.6 (72.7)	24.1 (75.4)	26.1 (79.0)	29.1 (84.4)	32.4 (90.3)
Mean maximum °C (°F)	27.6 (81.7)	28.2 (82.8)	26.3 (79.3)	24.3 (75.7)	21.3 (70.3)	18.7 (65.7)	17.7 (63.9)	18.8 (65.8)	19.9 (67.8)	21.3 (70.3)	23.3 (73.9)	25.9 (78.6)	28.6 (83.5)
Mean daily maximum °C (°F)	24.0 (75.2)	24.7 (76.5)	23.2 (73.8)	20.5 (68.9)	17.8 (64.0)	15.5 (59.9)	14.9 (58.8)	15.5 (59.9)	16.6 (61.9)	17.9 (64.2)	19.9 (67.8)	22.1 (71.8)	19.4 (66.9)
Daily mean °C (°F)	19.4 (66.9)	19.8 (67.6)	18.3 (64.9)	15.8 (60.4)	13.5 (56.3)	11.5 (52.7)	10.6 (51.1)	11.5 (52.7)	12.7 (54.9)	13.9 (57.0)	15.7 (60.3)	17.9 (64.2)	15.1 (59.1)
Mean daily minimum °C (°F)	14.7 (58.5)	14.9 (58.8)	13.4 (56.1)	11.2 (52.2)	9.1 (48.4)	7.5 (45.5)	6.3 (43.3)	7.4 (45.3)	8.8 (47.8)	9.9 (49.8)	11.5 (52.7)	13.6 (56.5)	10.7 (51.2)
Mean minimum °C (°F)	8.8 (47.8)	9.2 (48.6)	7.5 (45.5)	4.6 (40.3)	1.8 (35.2)	0.1 (32.2)	−1.0 (30.2)	1.4 (34.5)	2.1 (35.8)	4.2 (39.6)	5.4 (41.7)	7.9 (46.2)	−1.4 (29.5)
Record low °C (°F)	4.4 (39.9)	3.6 (38.5)	0.9 (33.6)	−0.2 (31.6)	−2.3 (27.9)	−4.9 (23.2)	−4.2 (24.4)	−3.4 (25.9)	−1.6 (29.1)	0.7 (33.3)	0.2 (32.4)	1.3 (34.3)	−4.9 (23.2)
Average rainfall mm (inches)	73.5 (2.89)	67.7 (2.67)	96.4 (3.80)	107.9 (4.25)	105.3 (4.15)	139.4 (5.49)	150.5 (5.93)	135.2 (5.32)	120.4 (4.74)	98.2 (3.87)	91.8 (3.61)	101.3 (3.99)	1,287.6 (50.71)
Source: NIWA (rain 1970–1993)

Whenupai is one of four places in New Zealand where weather balloons are regularly launched for MetService.
