= Lucas Creek =

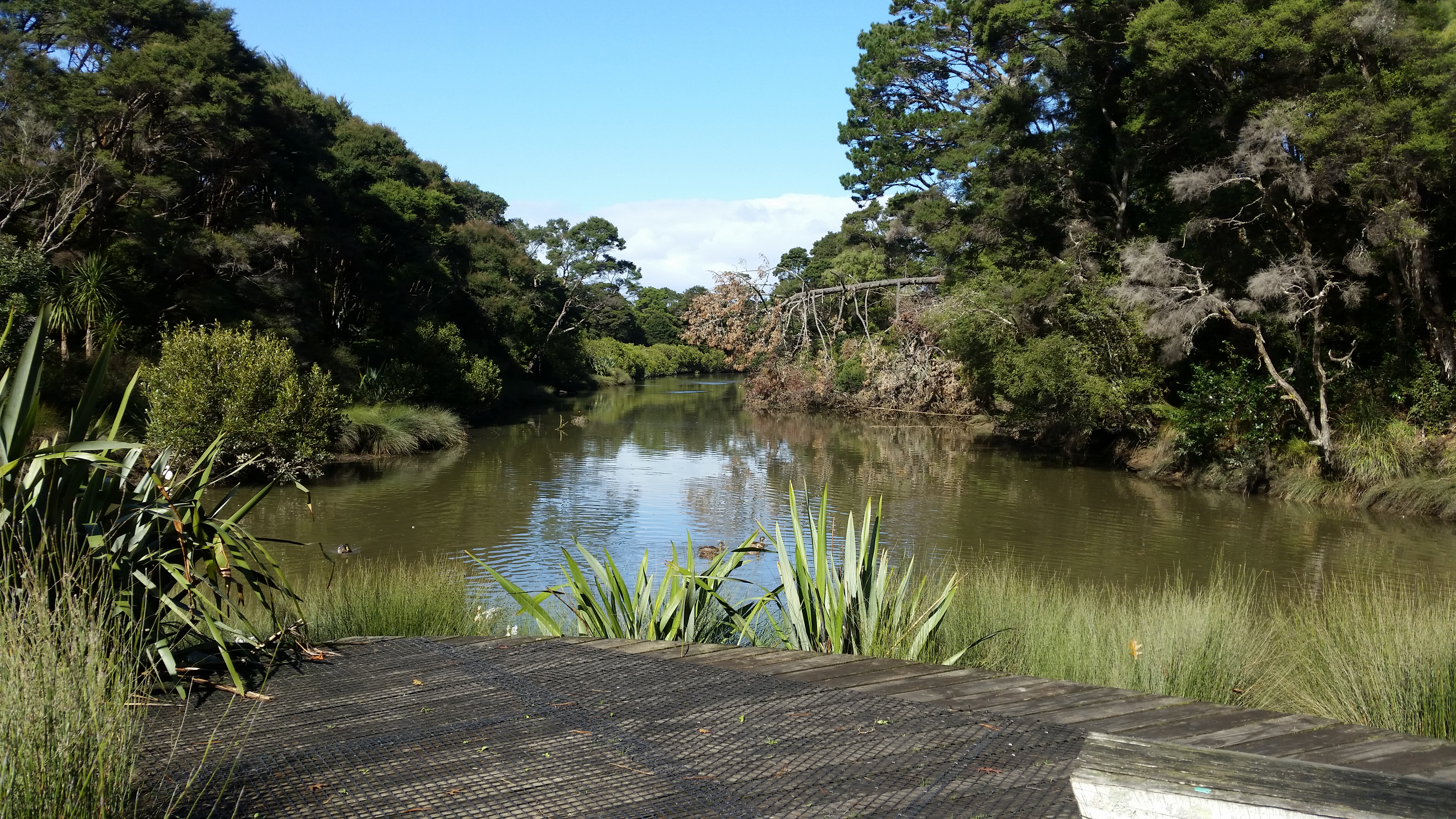
- The upper Lucas Creek seen from Kell Park in Albany

- Mouth of Lucas Creek Lucas Creek (New Zealand)
- Route of Lucas Creek
- Native name: Ōkahukura or Kaipātiki

Location
- Country: New Zealand
- Region: Auckland Region

Physical characteristics
- Source: Fairview Heights
  - coordinates: 36°42′13″S 174°43′17″E
- Mouth: Upper Waitematā Harbour
  - coordinates: 36°46′15″S 174°39′41″E

Basin features
- Progression: Lucas Creek → Upper Waitematā Harbour → Waitematā Harbour → Hauraki Gulf → Pacific Ocean
- Landmarks: Albany, Fairview Heights, Greenhithe, Lucas Heights, Oteha, Pāremoremo, Schnapper Rock
- Tributaries
  - left: Oteha Stream, Te Wharau Creek
- Waterfalls: Lucas Creek Waterfall
- Bridges: Lucas Creek Albany Bridge, Gills Road Bridge

Lucas Creek is a stream and tidal estuary of Upper Waitematā Harbour in the Auckland Region of New Zealand's North Island. It flows through Albany on the western North Shore, and enters the Upper Waitematā Harbour between Pāremoremo and Greenhithe.

== Geography ==
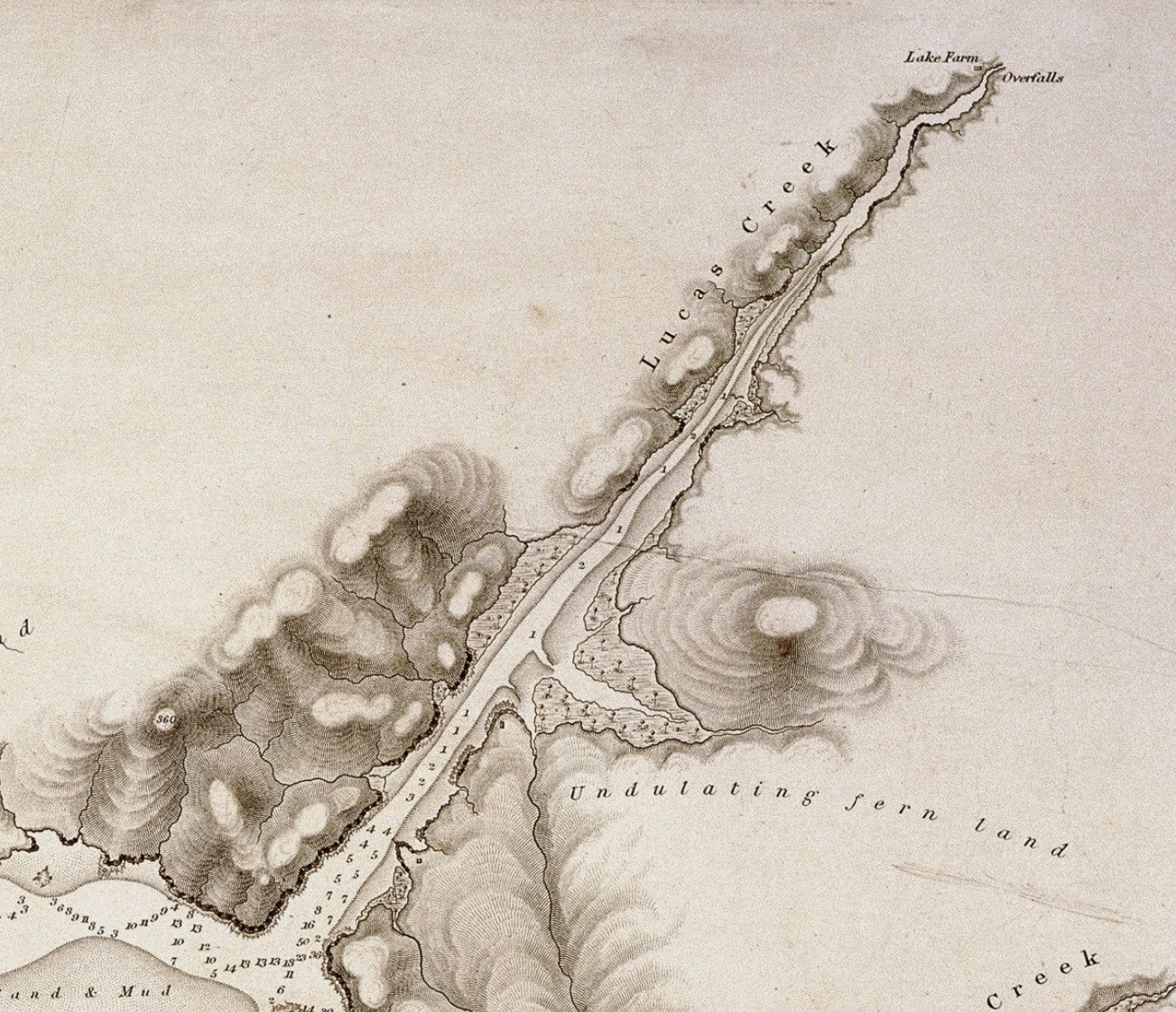
Hydrographic map of Lucas Creek from 1854

Lucas Creek is an arm of the Upper Waitematā Harbour. The creek begins as a freshwater stream, flowing south-west from Fairview Heights, The Lucas Creek Waterfall is found on a section of the stream near Gills Road in Albany, After flowing through Albany, Lucas Creek is joined by the Ōteha Stream. After widening to a tidal inlet and passing the suburbs of Lucas Heights and Schnapper Rock, the creek is joined by a second tributary, Te Wharau Creek, at Greenhithe. The creek enters the Upper Waitematā Harbour between Pāremoremo and Greenhithe, opposite to Herald Island. Some sources describe the freshwater section as the Lucas Stream, and the estuary as the Lucas Creek.

During the Last Glacial Maximum (known locally as the Ōtira Glaciation) when sea-levels were significantly lower, Lucas Creek was an entirely freshwater river that flowed into the Waitematā River (modern-day Upper Waitematā Harbour). Once sea levels rose between 12,000 and 7,000 years ago, the lower Lucas Creek was flooded, becoming an estuary. The first marine sediments are recorded as being deposited approximately 6,500 years ago. The Lucas Creek and wider Ōteha Valley area is predominantly formed from clay, The banks of the Lucas Creek were historically kauri-dominated forests. By the mid-19th century, the area had developed into a mānuka and fern-dominated scrubland.

== History ==
=== Māori history ===
The traditional Tāmaki Māori name for the creek was either Ōkahukura ("Of Kahukura"), or Kaipātiki ("Stream for Eating flounder") Māori settlement of the Auckland Region began around the 13th or 14th centuries. The North Shore was settled by Tāmaki Māori, including people descended from the Tainui migratory canoe and ancestors of figures such as Taikehu and Peretū. Many of the early Tāmaki Māori people of the North Shore identified as Ngā Oho, and the Lucas Creek has significance to modern iwi including Ngāti Manuhiri, Te Kawerau ā Maki and Ngāti Whātua o Kaipara. The poor clay soils of the area were not suitable for Māori traditional gardening techniques, but the creek was a good source for eels, crayfish and flounder.

An ara (traditional path) connected Lucas Creek and the Okura River to the north, which led to Long Bay and the upper Hauraki Gulf. This was used as a portage, where waka could be hauled overland between the two bodies of water, Numerous archaeological sites are found on the banks of the Lucas Creek and the Ōteha valley, because of its importance as a transportation node, following the ridge line of Lonely Track Road. This included a kāinga called Te Wharemoenanu ("The House of Sleep Talking"), located at the southern headland at the mouth of Lucas Creek, at modern Greenhithe. Other permanently settled kāinga could be found near Te Wharau Creek, including Te Karaka, located at the Te Wharau Creek headland.

By the first half of the 19th century, the Greenhithe and Lucas Creek areas were one of the most densely settled areas of the North Shore by Tāmaki Māori peoples. During the early 1820s, most Māori of the North Shore fled for the Waikato or Northland due to the threat of war parties during the Musket Wars. When people returned in greater numbers to the Auckland Region in the mid-1830s, Te Kawerau ā Maki focused settlement at Te Henga / Bethells Beach.

=== Early colonial era ===
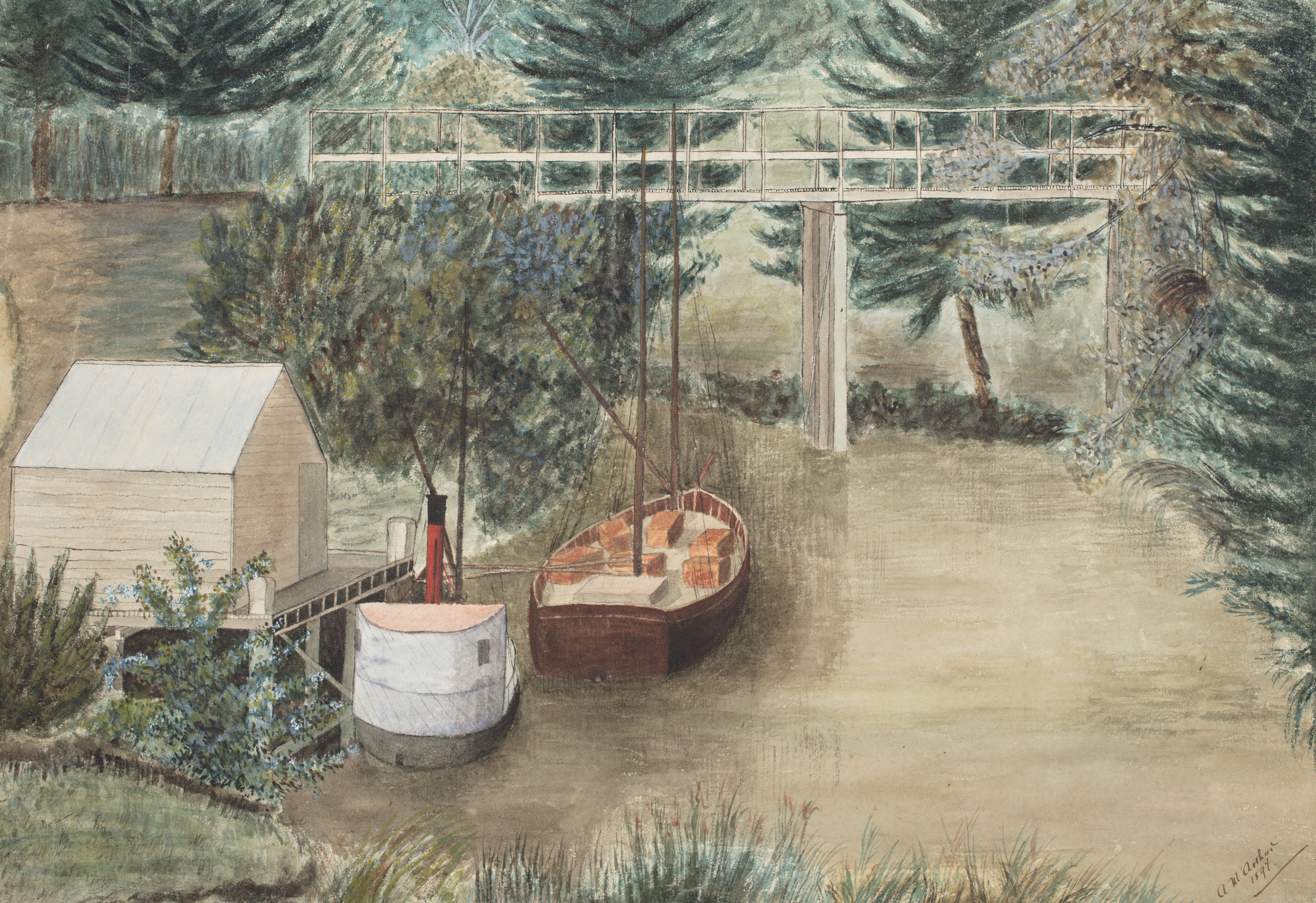
A painting of the Lucas Creek wharf and Albany Bridge by Alice McArthur (1897)

The first European visitors to Lucas Creek were predominantly kauri loggers in the early 1840s. The Crown purchased Lucas Creek from Māori as a part of the Mahurangi Block, in 1841. Early settler Daniel Clucas, the namesake of the creek, arrived in Auckland in the early 1840s and established a flax mill along the upper reaches of the creek near modern-day Albany. Early maps variously labelled the creek as Clucas Creek, or Lucas Creek. Clucas and his wife left the area in 1846, having struggled to make a living in the isolated area. While the kauri logging industry finished early in the 1840s, gum digging soon after by itinerant diggers became a major industry, and one of the major camps in the area was established at Schnapper Rock on the banks of the Lucas Creek. The area also became known for illicit moonshine operations during the 1860s and 1870s, which led to the naming of one of the bays of the creek, Whisky Cove.

By the 1850s, a village called Lucas Creek had begun to be established in the upper section of the creek (later renamed Albany in 1890), joined by a community established in the mid-1860s by Thomas and Mary Forgham, later known as Greenhithe. In the early 1870s, the first makeshift wooden bridge was constructed across the Lucas Creek, near the Lucas Creek village. The gum digging industry thrived until the 1880s, after which fruit growing became an important trade for the area.

River transport along the Lucas Creek was the main transportation for Albany and Greenhithe in the 19th century. By 1915, roads on the North Shore had improved enough that river traffic had begun to lessen, and in 1930 the Kaipatiki ferry to Albany ceased operation.

While Lucas Creek during much of the 20th century had minimal sedimentation, this increased in the 1990s, when areas such as Albany on the banks of the river were developed for suburban housing.

== Gallery ==
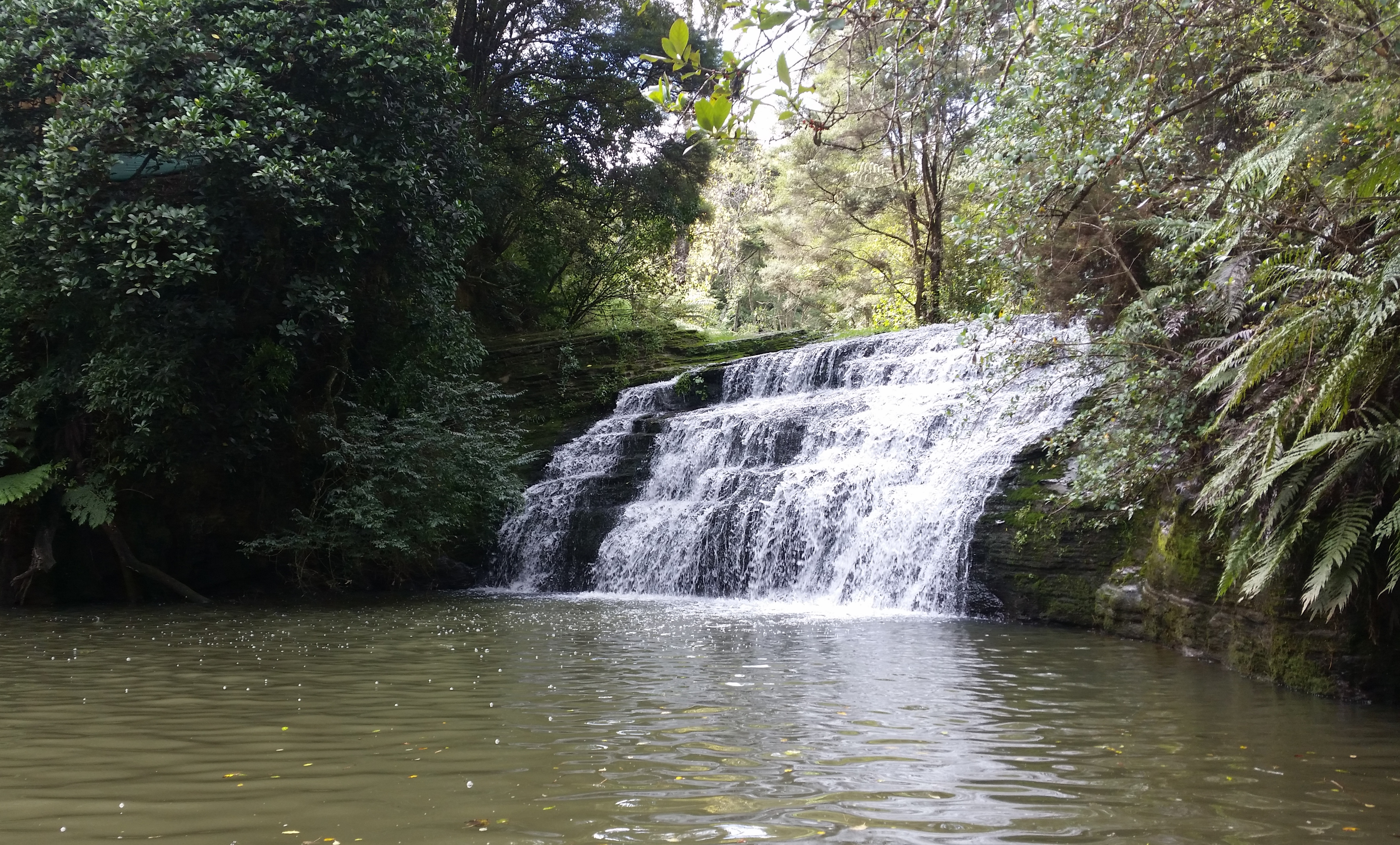
Lucas Creek Waterfall

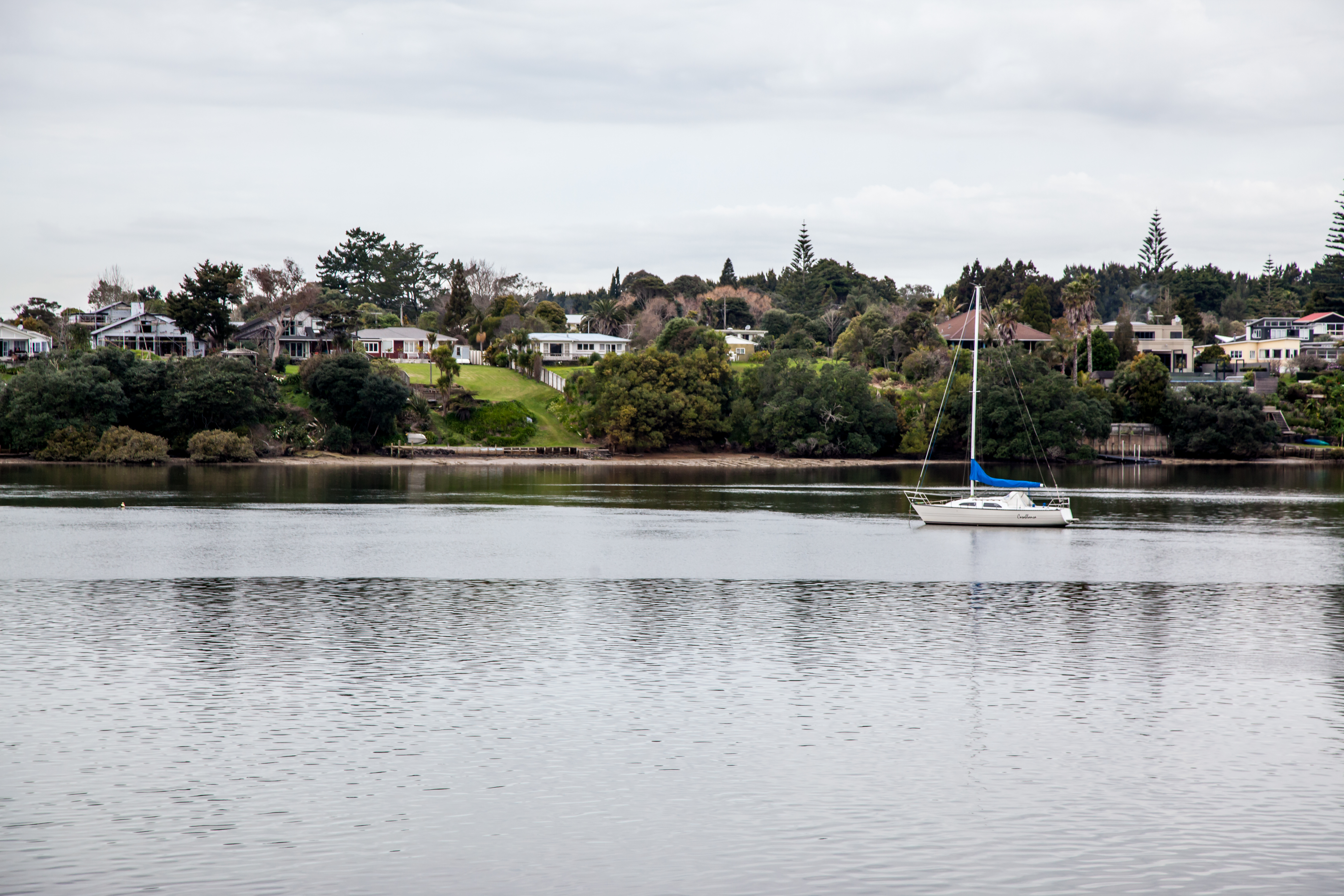
Yachts moored at the mouth of the Lucas Creek

== Bibliography ==
- Dunmore, John (2001). Greenhithe: Today & Yesterday. Auckland: Heritage Press Ltd. ISBN 0-908708-53-X. OCLC 80291058. Wikidata Q123416573.
- King, R. E. (1984), Tauhinu: a History of Greenhithe, OCLC 37242212, Wikidata Q123416976
- Harris, Alison; Stevenson, Robert (2002). Once There Were Green Fields: the Story of Albany, New Zealand. Albany. ISBN 0-473-08160-1. OCLC 62526122. Wikidata Q123424599.
- Taua, Te Warena (2009). "He Kohikohinga Kōrero mō Hikurangi". In Macdonald, Finlay; Kerr, Ruth (eds.). West: The History of Waitakere. Random House. pp. 23–48. ISBN 9781869790080.
