= Lucas Heights, New Zealand =

Suburb of Auckland, New Zealand

Lucas Heights
- Suburb
- Interactive map of Lucas Heights
- Coordinates: 36.734°S 174.675°E
- Country: New Zealand
- City: Auckland
- Local authority: Auckland Council
- Electoral ward: Albany ward
- Local board: Upper Harbour Local Board
- Postcode: 0632

Dairy Flat	Albany Heights	Albany Heights
Coatesville	Lucas Heights	Albany
Coatesville	Pāremoremo	Rosedale

Lucas Heights is one of the northernmost suburbs of the contiguous Auckland metropolitan area in New Zealand. It is on the North Shore, directly west of Albany, and is located in the Albany ward for local government purposes.

== History ==
There is evidence of a Pā on the north bank of Lucas Creek. Its Maori name is thought to be Kaipatiki, which translates to 'the feeding ground of the flounder’.

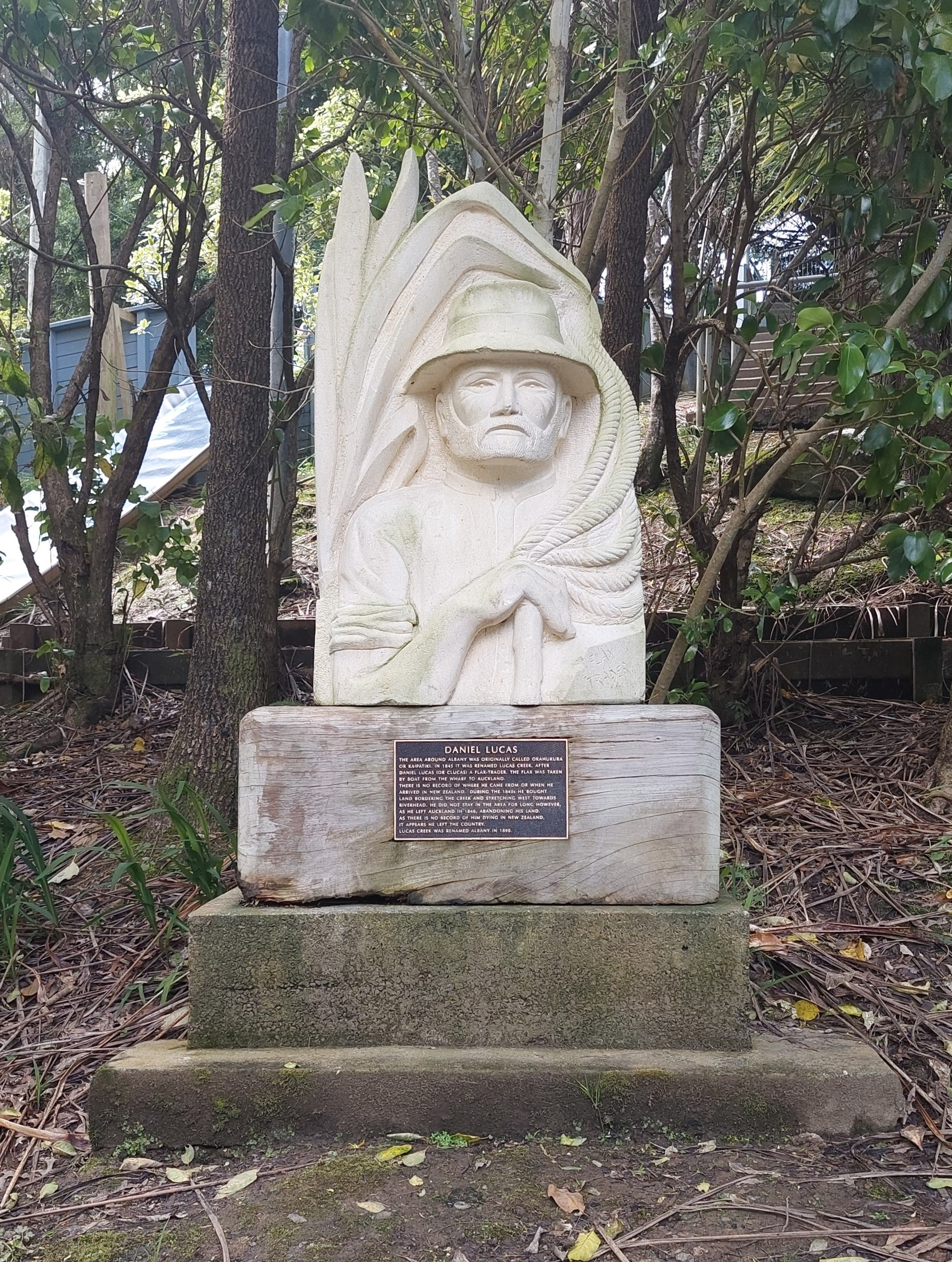
Daniel Lucas Memorial

Lucas Creek forms the eastern boundary of the suburb and is named after Daniel Clucas, a flax miller and landholder settled here in the early 1840s.

By the late 1880s it had become a fruit-growing area.

== Demographics ==
Lucas Heights is included in the demographics for Pāremoremo.
