= Lucas Heights =

Lucas Heights may refer to:

- High Flux Australian Reactor, also known as the Lucas Heights Nuclear Reactor
- Lucas Heights, New South Wales
- Lucas Heights, New Zealand
