= Brigham's Creek =

Brigham's Creek or Brigham Creek is a stream and former settlement located near the Upper Waitemata Harbour of New Zealand. Brigham's Creek is 3 km (1.9 mi) east of Kumeu. The first settler arrived in 1857 but was largely absent. In 1860 William Sinton arrived with his wife and established a store, providing to the nearby gum diggers. Over the years the Sinton family expanded their land holdings eventually acquiring most of Brigham's Creek. In 1961 the family sold their property and Brigham's Creek became subdivided into smaller sections. Brigham's Creek is primarily used for dry stock but has some lots used for dairy and viticulture.

== Geography ==
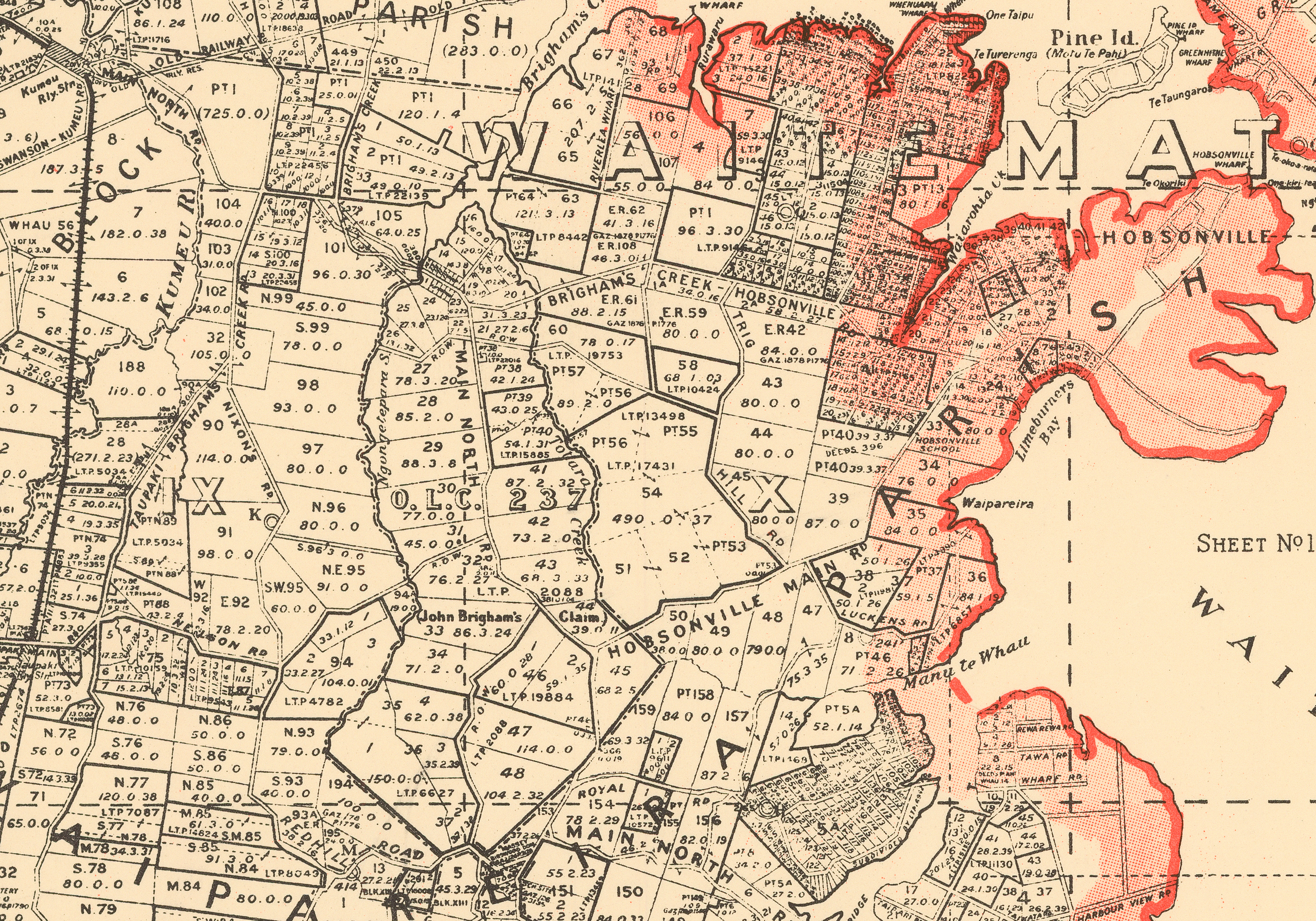
Map of John Brigham's Claim (centre)

Brigham's Creek is located 3 km (1.9 mi) east of Kumeu. The locality of Brigham's Creek is bounded by the Ngongetepara and Waiteputa streams to the west and Totara creek and Sakaria stream to the east. The land remains rural aside from land off Don Buck Road.

== Waterway ==
Brigham's Creek drains into the Upper Waitemata Harbour. It is a relatively narrow and small creek and quite shallow.

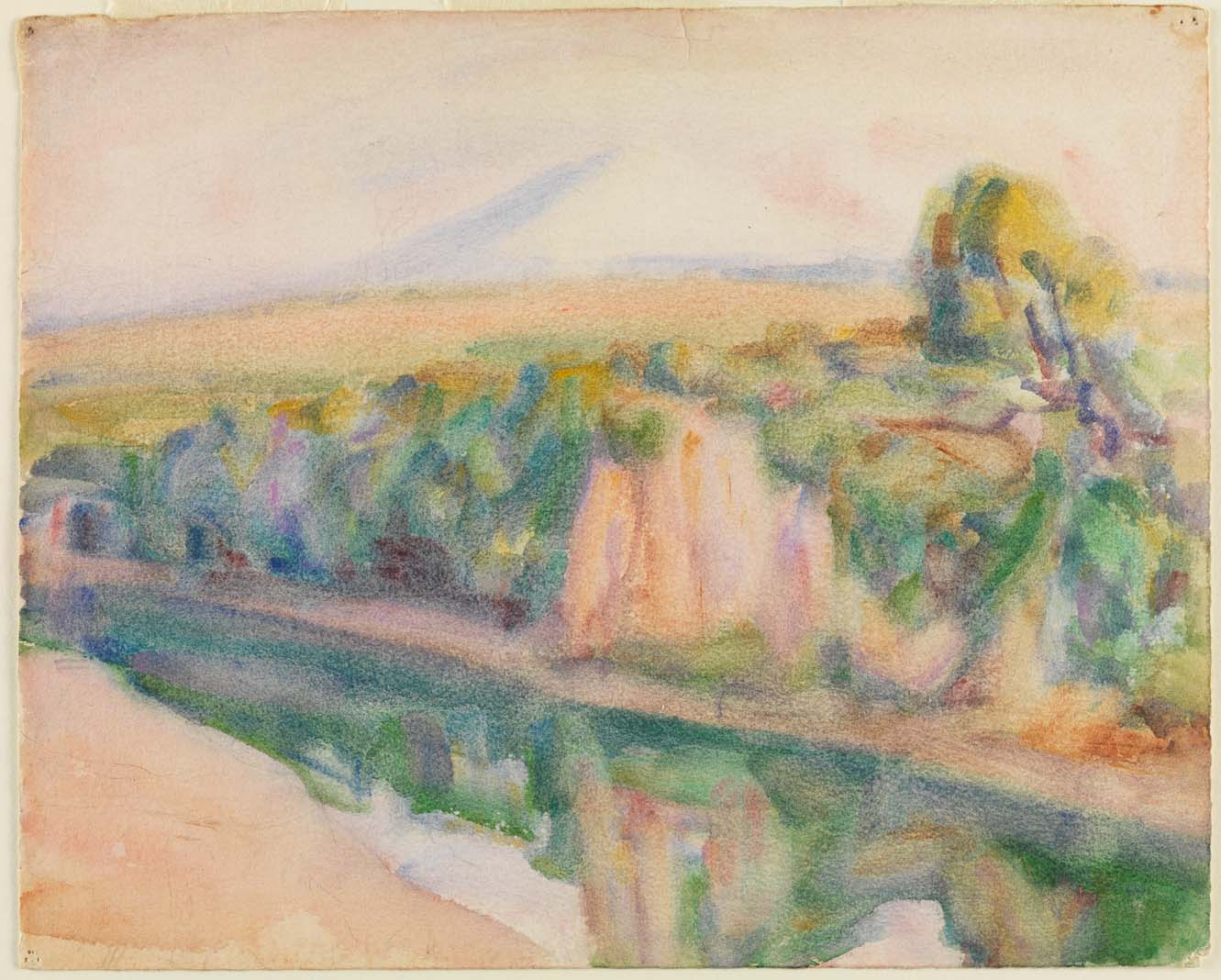
Brigham's Creek, tide rising by John Russell

Brigham's Creek has a high number of mangroves and the sediment is primarily mud. Common species in the waterway are Arthritica bifurca, the mud-flat snail, Aricidea sp., Heteromastus filiformis, and members of Nereidae, Capitellidae, and Cirratulidae.

The Waiteputa and Totara streams flow into Brigham's Creek.

== Toponymy ==
Brigham's Creek is named after John Brigham, an early settler of the area. The Maori name for Brigham's Creek is Pitoitoi (the name of a bird).

An area at the head of the waterway was known as Kopupaka (lit. scorched stomach) to Maori. The western head was known as Turangaokawau (lit. the place where Kawau stood).

== Settlement ==
John Brigham came to New Zealand from Derry, Ireland. Brigham secured a Crown Grant (Note: A Crown Grant is the transfer of Crown land to private title. Crown Grants could be part of a contract, a reward for service, or just purchased from the Crown.) of 1,971 acres (798 ha) in 1857. Brigham also owned land on Waiheke Island, and established a flour mill at Riverhead.

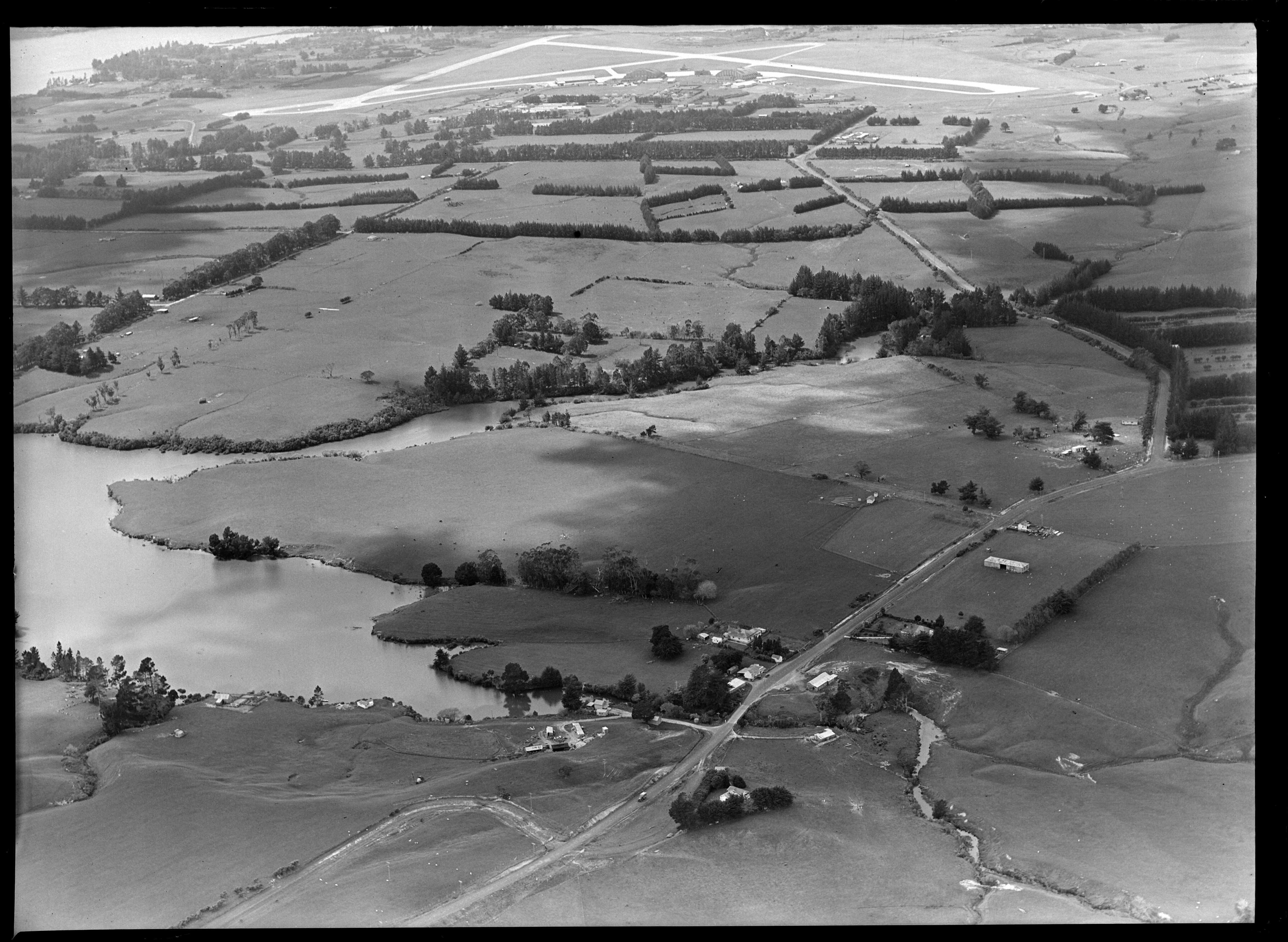
Aerial view of Brigham's Creek (bottom) and Whenuapai (top)

William Sinton arrived in New Zealand in 1860 with his wife. Sinton came from Jedburgh, Scotland. He settled in Hobsonville and was granted a 40 acres (16 ha) section. (Note: Land grants were given to settlers to encourage settlement and development of unproductive rural land) The Sinton family operated a store at Brigham's Creek. The country was swampish and was not suitable for agriculture, but Sinton worked the land until it was capable of growing oats. In 1890 Janet, William's widow, obtained Noble Johnston's Brigham Creek and expanded the Sinton farm. In 1893 the Sintons established a butchery and slaughterhouse. The Sintons travelled to gum digger camps to the west such at Riverhead to deliver supplies in exchange for kauri gum, which was taken by boat to Auckland to be sold for goods. In 1896 the land was subdivided and advertised for sale as horticultural land suitable for strawberries, and by the 20th century the Sintons owned over 1,000 acres (400 ha) of John Brigham's grant. The Sinton family had grown large with three generations living under one roof. Two new homes were constructed along the Great North Road with Janet moving into her own home. (Note: Now 191 State Highway 16) The Sintons provided accommodation and food for drovers and livestock travelling to sales yards, as well as the gum diggers active to the west. The Brigham Creek property was able to accommodate 1,250 head of cattle. In 1961 the Sinton family sold the Brigham's Creek farm. Over the years the farm began to be subdivided into smaller lots. There are several archaeological sites around Brigham's Creek associated with the Sinton family including several extant 19th-century buildings.

Brigham's Creek land use is primarily dry stock but also features dairying and vineyards. Brigham's Creek is one of the main sources of clay in the upper North Island.

== Transport ==
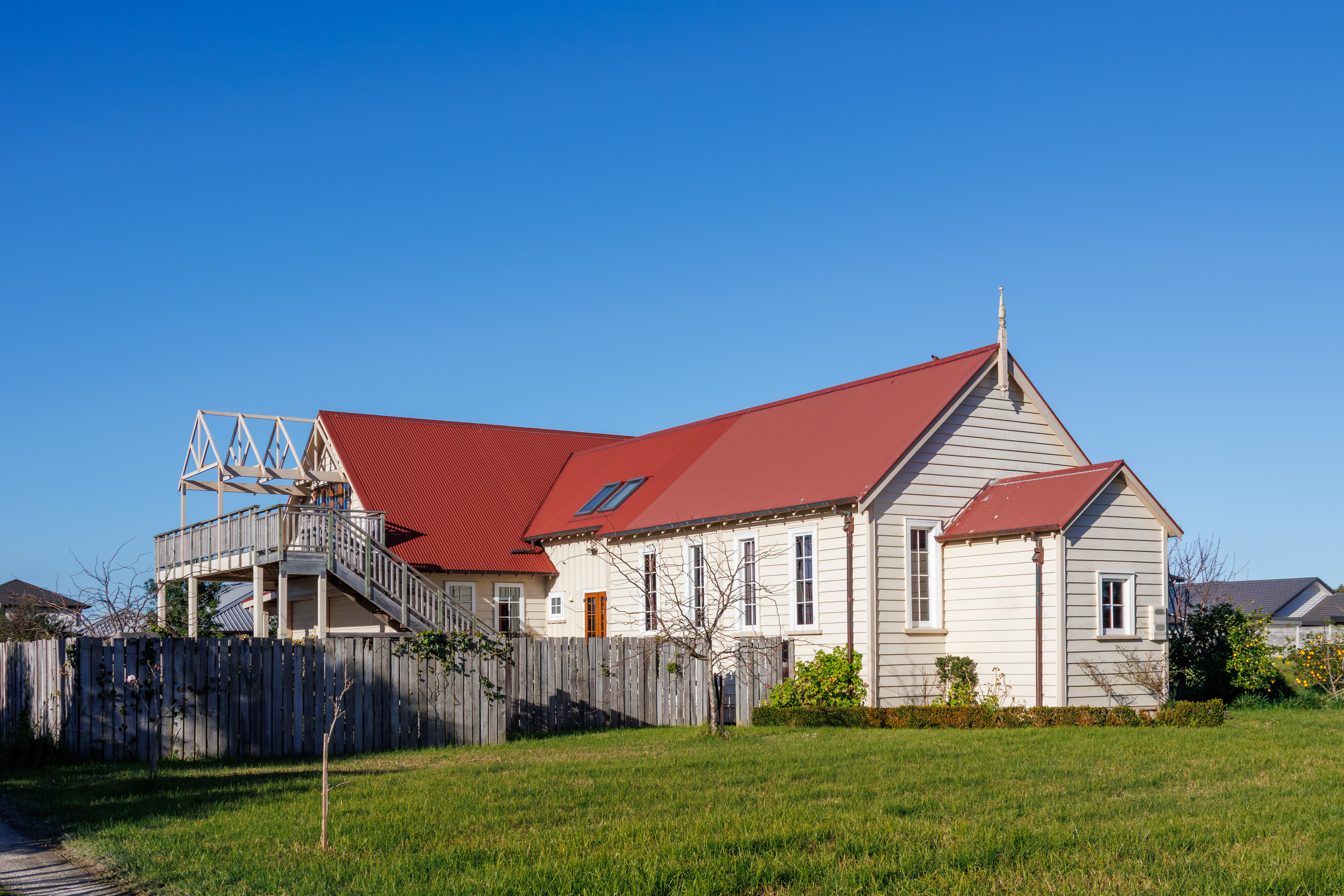
The former Brigham's Creek Church, now situated at Clarks Lane, Hobsonville

In 1866 Mac Russell, an engineer for the Auckland Provincial Government, reported on a plan to connect the Kaipara Harbour to the Waitemata Harbour. Russell reported that for a cost of approximately £60,000 the Kumeu River could be connected with Brigham's Creek. Ultimately this idea was abandoned in favour of a railway to Helensville for a cheaper price.

From 1892 a steamer service regularly stopped at Brigham's Creek on the way between Riverhead and Auckland.

A bridge was constructed c.1900 to allow drovers to cross the stream. State Highway 16 passes over the creek and Brigham Creek Road cuts through part of Brigham's land grant. The construction of the SH16 Brigham's Creek roundabout resulted in the Brigham's Creek Church being relocated to Clarks Lane.
