= Coatesville, New Zealand =

Coatesville
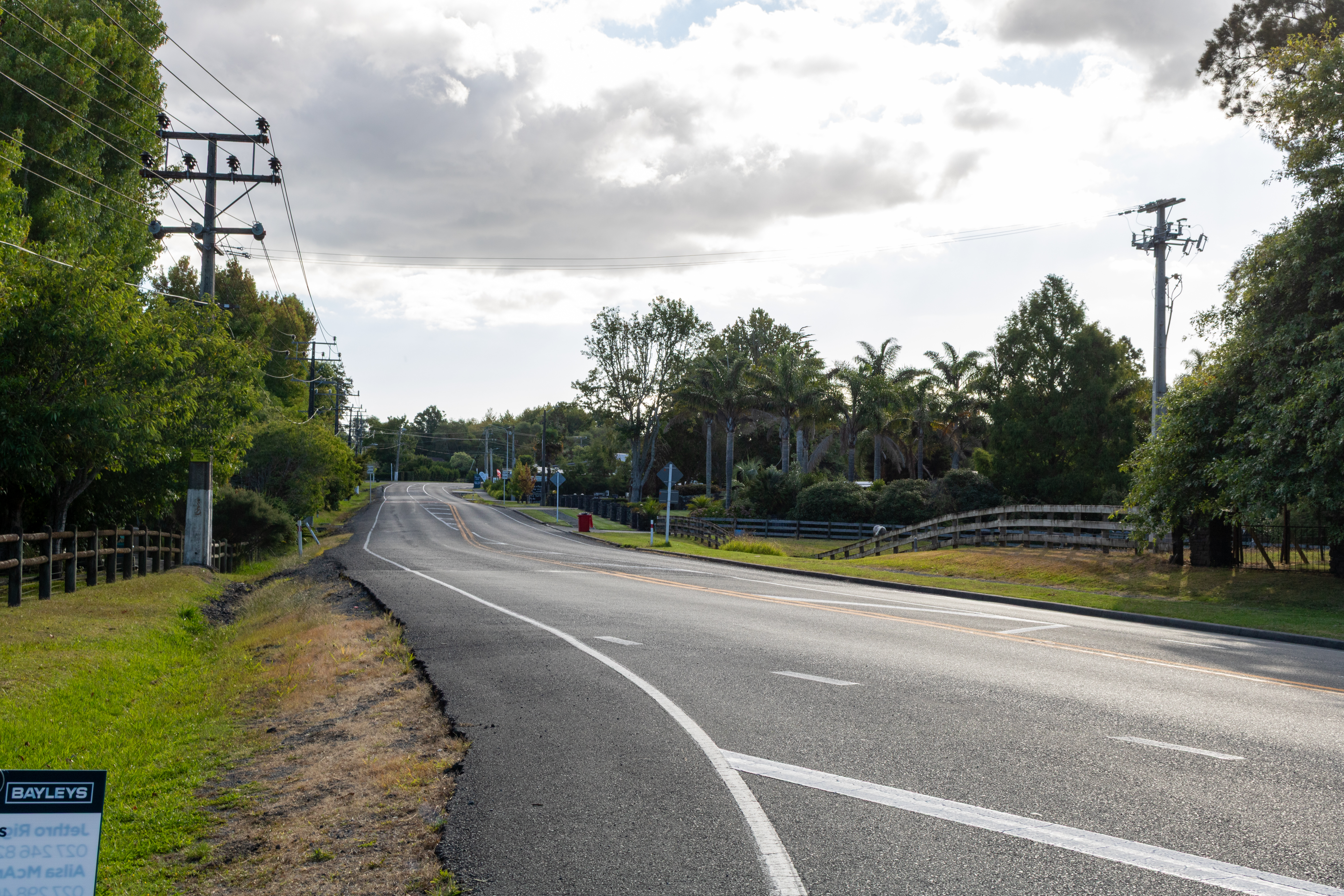
- Coatesville-Riverhead Highway, the main road through Coatesville
- Interactive map of Coatesville
- Coordinates: 36°42′59″S 174°38′33″E
- Country: New Zealand
- Region: Auckland
- Ward: Rodney ward
- Local board: Rodney Local Board
- Subdivision: Dairy Flat subdivision

Government
  - Territorial Authority: Auckland Council

Area
  - Total: 21.59 km^{2} (8.34 sq mi)

Population (June 2025)
  - Total: 2,260
  - Density: 105/km^{2} (271/sq mi)

Coatesville is an affluent, rural community situated approximately 30 kilometres (19 miles) north-west of Auckland, New Zealand. Albany lies to the east, Paremoremo to the south, Riverhead to the south-west, and Dairy Flat to the north.

The area was called Fernielea until 1926, when it was renamed after Gordon Coates, the prime minister at the time.

Mincher is a garden of national significance in Coatesville.

== Demographics ==
Coatesville covers 21.59 km^{2} (8.34 sq mi) and had an estimated population of 2,260 as of June 2025, with a population density of 105 people per km^{2}.

Historical population
Year	Pop.	±% p.a.
2006	1,974	—
2013	1,845	−0.96%
2018	1,920	+0.80%
2023	2,112	+1.92%
The 2006 population is for a larger area of 24.37 km^{2}. Source:

Coatesville had a population of 2,112 in the 2023 New Zealand census, an increase of 192 people (10.0%) since the 2018 census, and an increase of 267 people (14.5%) since the 2013 census. There were 1,041 males, 1,065 females and 9 people of other genders in 681 dwellings. 2.8% of people identified as LGBTIQ+. The median age was 43.0 years (compared with 38.1 years nationally). There were 393 people (18.6%) aged under 15 years, 396 (18.8%) aged 15 to 29, 1,008 (47.7%) aged 30 to 64, and 321 (15.2%) aged 65 or older.

People could identify as more than one ethnicity. The results were 85.5% European (Pākehā); 5.7% Māori; 1.8% Pasifika; 13.4% Asian; 1.0% Middle Eastern, Latin American and African New Zealanders (MELAA); and 3.1% other, which includes people giving their ethnicity as "New Zealander". English was spoken by 97.3%, Māori language by 0.9%, Samoan by 0.3%, and other languages by 17.6%. No language could be spoken by 1.1% (e.g. too young to talk). New Zealand Sign Language was known by 0.3%. The percentage of people born overseas was 34.4, compared with 28.8% nationally.

Religious affiliations were 27.4% Christian, 0.4% Hindu, 0.1% Islam, 0.7% Buddhist, 0.4% New Age, 0.1% Jewish, and 1.4% other religions. People who answered that they had no religion were 62.8%, and 6.8% of people did not answer the census question.

Of those at least 15 years old, 594 (34.6%) people had a bachelor's or higher degree, 825 (48.0%) had a post-high school certificate or diploma, and 303 (17.6%) people exclusively held high school qualifications. The median income was $52,900, compared with $41,500 nationally. 471 people (27.4%) earned over $100,000 compared to 12.1% nationally. The employment status of those at least 15 was that 879 (51.1%) people were employed full-time, 300 (17.5%) were part-time, and 18 (1.0%) were unemployed.

== Education ==
Coatesville School is a coeducational contributing primary (years 1–6) school with a roll of 252 students as at July 2026, A school was first established in the area in 1916, but it closed in 1920. A new school opened in 1923. The school celebrated 100 years on 16 of October 2016.

Coatesville Playcentre started in Coatesville Hall in the 1970s before moving into a purpose built centre next to the school in the 1980s. Playcentre offers parent-led early childhood education for children aged 0–5 years.

Coatesville Learning Centre opened in 2012 catering for 1- to 5-year-old children.
