= Herald Island, New Zealand =

Island in the upper Waitematā Harbour, Auckland

Coordinates: 36°46′45″S 174°39′20″E

Herald Island
- Suburb
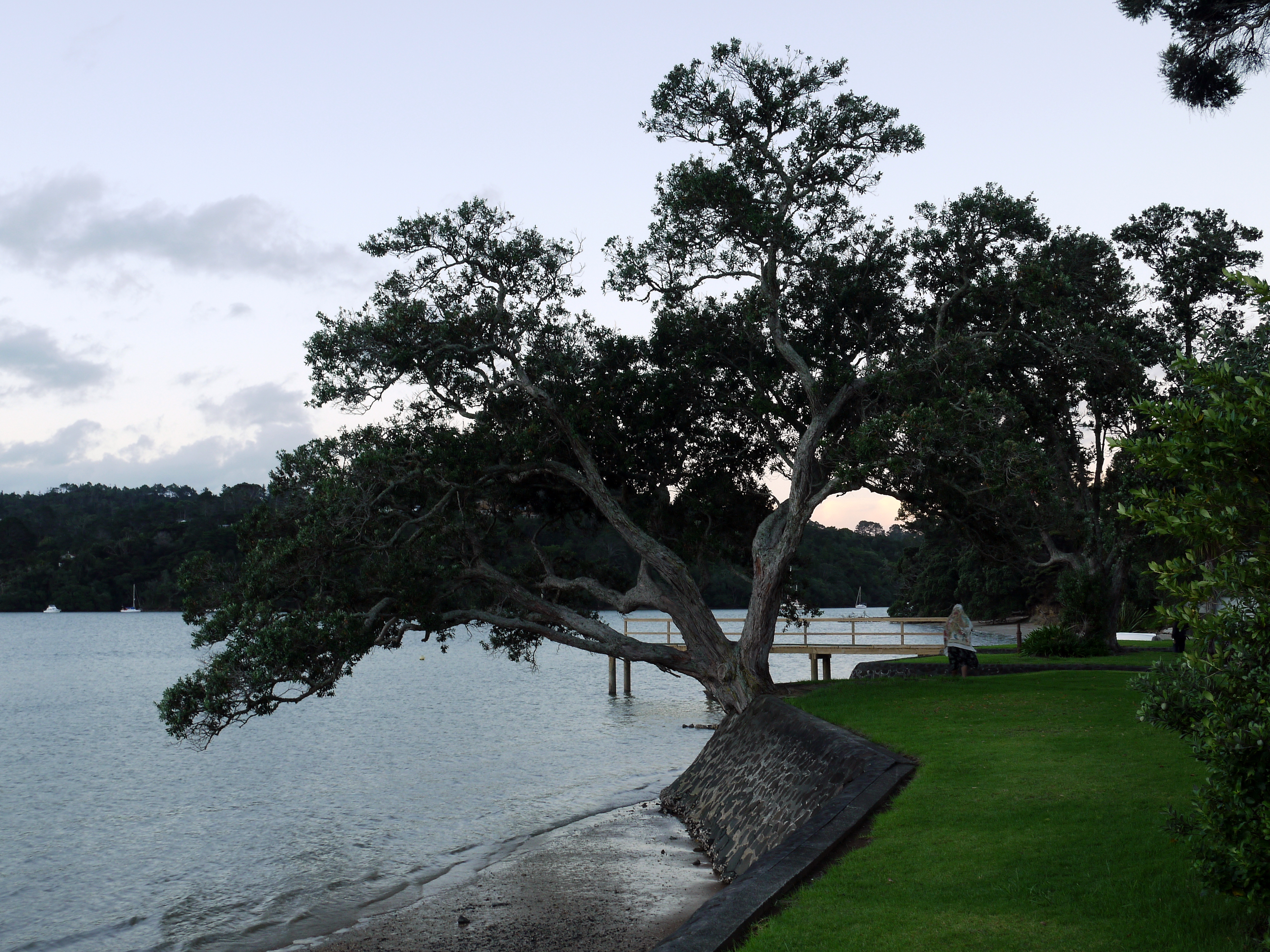
- Christmas Beach, on the northern side of Herald Island
- Interactive map of Herald Island
- Country: New Zealand
- City: Auckland
- Local authority: Auckland Council
- Electoral ward: Albany ward
- Local board: Upper Harbour Local Board

Area
  - Land: 38 ha (94 acres)

Population (2023 Census)
  - Total: 675
  - Density: 1,800/km^{2} (4,600/sq mi)

Herald Island is an island of approximately 100 acres (40 ha) in the Upper Waitematā Harbour in Auckland, New Zealand.

== Etymology ==
Herald Island was originally known as Pine Island and Woods Island. The current name originates from HMS Herald, the ship that carried William Hobson to New Zealand.

== Geography ==
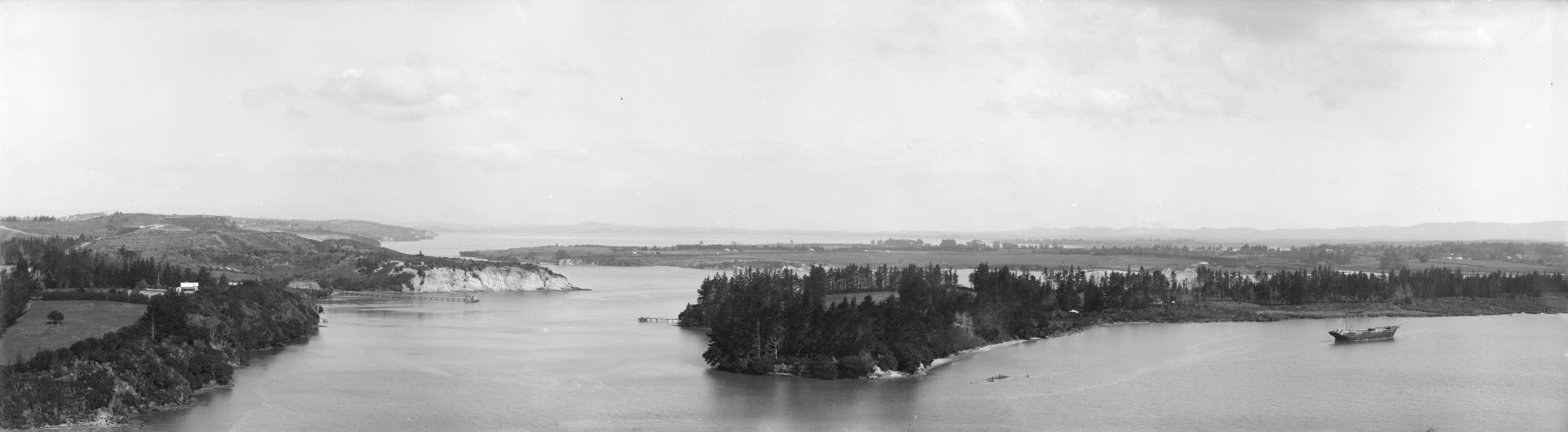
Photo from 1912 showing Greenhithe (left), Herald Island (front right), and Hobsonville (back right)

Herald Island is located in the Upper Waitematā Harbour between Whenuapai (to the west) and Greenhithe (to the east). It covers 0.38 km^{2} (0.15 sq mi). The island has a length of some 1,250 metres (1,370 yd), running northeast/southwest, and a width of some 330 metres (360 yd). It is relatively flat and low-lying, though it rises slightly at the eastern end

The island is connected to the mainland at its western end by the Kingsway Road causeway, which crosses 400 metres (440 yd) of marshy tidal zone. The northern shore of the island is dominated by Christmas Beach, which runs almost the entire length of the island. A large mudflat lies along the southwestern edge of the island, extending towards the suburb of Hobsonville to the south. The eastern edge of the island is located along a safe channel, frequently used by small pleasure craft; the Herald Island Boating Club is situated here, at the island's easternmost point.

Two main roads, The Terrace and Ferry Parade, run parallel to the northern and southern shores of the island respectively. These are connected by several short streets which cross the island from northwest to southeast. An area of open parkland, Herald Island Domain, is located in the centre of the island, and a smaller park, Pākihi Reserve, is sited close to the boat club at the island's eastern end.

== History ==
=== Pre-European history ===
In Māori, the island was given various names, including Motu Pākihi (Pākihi) and Te Pahi ō Te Poataniwha (or Te Pāhī). In the 18th Century, the island was a seasonal residence for Waiohua paramount chief Kiwi Tāmaki, when it was the season to snare birds. During the Ngāti Whātua/Te Taoū war with Waiohua, the twin Waiohua chiefs Hūpipi and Hūmātaitai from Ōrākei were killed at Herald Island by a Ngāti Whātua war party.

=== European history ===
It was known as Wood's Island after its first European owner, from the 1840s until the late 1880s, and from the late 1880s until the early 1950s, as Pine Island. In 1953, the island joined the Waitakere Riding of the Waitemata County, having previously not had any form of local government. At this time, the island's name was officially changed to Herald Island after HMS Herald.

The first fruit trees in the Upper Waitematā Harbour area were planted at Herald Island in 1847, and by 1922 the island had become a popular location for picnickers and daytrippers to visit by ferry. The island was linked to the mainland by a causeway in 1957, for which Waitemata County Council charged residents a special rate of 5·878d. The first school is still located where it originally was built, and was used as a school until a larger one was built up the road and it became a post office, then later the museum.

There are 275 houses on the island, which has a walkway around its perimeter. The island is almost entirely residential, with no shops but some small home-based businesses.

== Demographics ==
Historical population
Year	Pop.	±% p.a.
2006	696	—
2013	720	+0.49%
2018	702	−0.51%
2023	675	−0.78%

Herald Island had a population of 675 in the 2023 New Zealand census, a decrease of 27 people (−3.8%) since the 2018 census, and a decrease of 45 people (−6.2%) since the 2013 census. There were 330 males and 342 females in 258 dwellings. 4.4% of people identified as LGBTIQ+. There were 99 people (14.7%) aged under 15 years, 99 (14.7%) aged 15 to 29, 330 (48.9%) aged 30 to 64, and 147 (21.8%) aged 65 or older.

People could identify as more than one ethnicity. The results were 88.4% European (Pākehā); 8.9% Māori; 4.4% Pasifika; 6.7% Asian; 1.8% Middle Eastern, Latin American and African New Zealanders (MELAA); and 1.8% other, which includes people giving their ethnicity as "New Zealander". English was spoken by 96.4%, Māori language by 0.4%, and other languages by 11.1%. No language could be spoken by 2.2% (e.g. too young to talk). The percentage of people born overseas was 26.7, compared with 28.8% nationally.

Religious affiliations were 32.0% Christian, 1.3% Hindu, 0.9% Islam, 0.4% New Age, and 1.8% other religions. People who answered that they had no religion were 59.1%, and 5.3% of people did not answer the census question.

Of those at least 15 years old, 147 (25.5%) people had a bachelor's or higher degree, 294 (51.0%) had a post-high school certificate or diploma, and 90 (15.6%) people exclusively held high school qualifications. 108 people (18.8%) earned over $100,000 compared to 12.1% nationally. The employment status of those at least 15 was that 288 (50.0%) people were employed full-time, 93 (16.1%) were part-time, and 6 (1.0%) were unemployed.

The island is part of the larger Whenuapai statistical area.

== Public Transport ==
Herald Island is no longer served by public transport. In 1897 the Devonport Steam Ferry Company bought the island (then known as Pine Island) and ran excursion trips there from Auckland until 1940. The Upper Harbour Ferry Company, a subsidiary of the Devonport Steam Ferry Company, ran a launch service, carrying passengers and freight, to the island, as well as other localities in the upper Waitemata Harbour, from late 1925 until 1934. Bus services ceased in 2020.
