= Upper Waitematā Harbour =

Section of the Waitematā Harbour in New Zealand

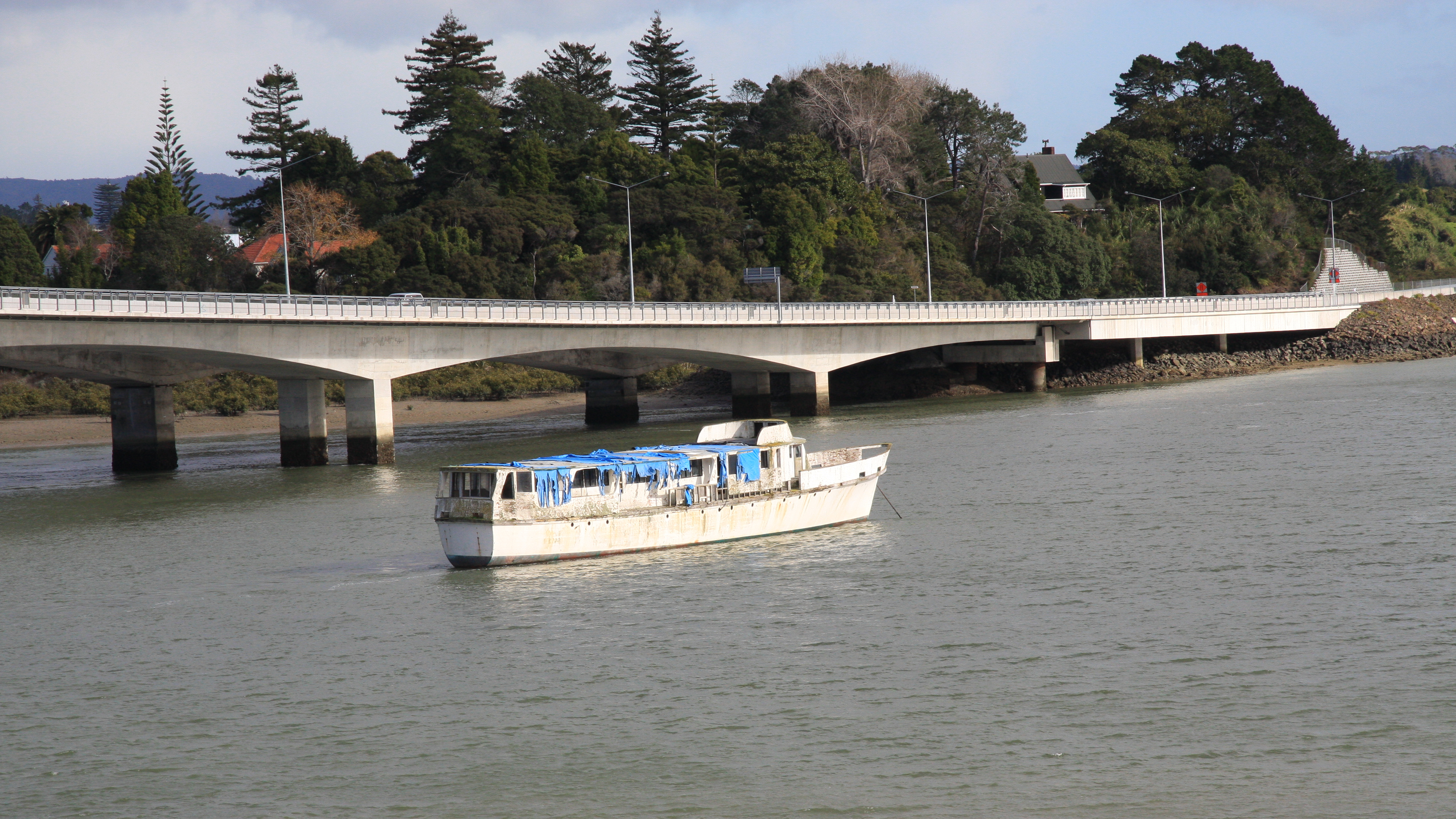
- Abandoned boat near the Upper Harbour Bridge

- Mouth of the Upper Waitematā Harbour Upper Waitematā Harbour (New Zealand)
- Route of the Upper Waitematā Harbour
- Native name: Te Wairoa-ō-Kahu

Location
- Country: New Zealand
- Region: Auckland Region

Physical characteristics
- Source
  - location: Rangitopuni Stream
  - coordinates: 36.75637°S 174.60023°E
- Mouth: Waitematā Harbour
  - coordinates: 36.8117°S 174.6867°E

Basin features
- Progression: Upper Waitematā Harbour → Waitematā Harbour → Hauraki Gulf → Pacific Ocean
- Landmarks: Beach Haven, Herald Island, Hobsonville, Pāremoremo, Riverhead, Whenuapai
- Tributaries
  - left: Pāremoremo Creek, Lucas Creek, Oruamo or Hellyers Creek
  - right: Brigham's Creek, Rarawaru Creek, Orchard Stream, Waiarohia Stream
- Waterbodies: Waiarohia Inlet
- Bridges: Upper Harbour Bridge

The Upper Waitematā Harbour, known locally as simply Upper Harbour, is an estuary of the Waitematā Harbour in the Auckland Region of New Zealand. It flows south-east from the town of Riverhead, and was historically the border between Waitakere City and North Shore City in Auckland.

== Geography ==
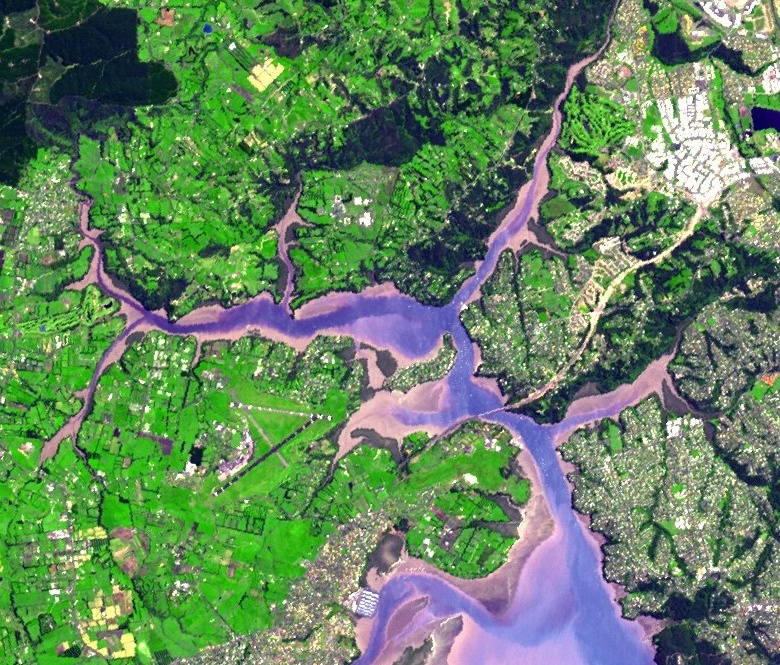
Satellite view of the Upper Waitematā Harbour

The Upper Waitematā Harbour is an estuary of the Waitematā Harbour, which flows into the central Waitematā Harbour through a narrow outlet. Much of the Upper Waitematā Harbour area contains mangrove forests, and areas of mangrove forest that transitions into forests. Major tributaries of the Upper Waitematā Harbour include the Brigham Creek, Rangitopuni Stream, Paremoremo Creek, Lucas Creek, and Oruamo or Hellyers Creek.

During the Last Glacial Maximum (known locally as the Ōtira Glaciation) when sea-levels were significantly lower, the Upper Waitematā Harbour was the source of a river that forms the modern Waitematā Harbour. The river flowed eastwards along the Waitematā Harbour, turning north-east along the Rangitoto Channel, and entering the ocean to the north of Great Barrier Island. Once sea-levels rose between 12,000 and 7,000 years ago, the Upper Waitematā Harbour was flooded, becoming an estuary.

== History ==
The Upper Waitematā Harbour area is within the rohe of Te Kawerau ā Maki. The traditional Māori name for the estuary is Te Wairoa-ō-Kahu ("The Great River of Kahu"), referring to the ancestor Kahumatamomoe, a second generation descendant of the crew of the Te Arawa migratory waka. The harbour was an important trading route for Tāmaki Māori peoples, due to Te Tōangaroa, the overland canoe portage which linked the Kaipara Harbour with the Waitematā Harbour. The portage could be travelled to across either Rangitōpuni (Riverhead) in the north, or at Pitoitoi (Brigham Creek) in the south. The shores of the estuary had numerous kāinga (unfortified villages), and the area was known for its diverse seafood resources. The channel between Greenhithe and Herald Island was known as Wainoni.

By the first half of the 19th century, the headlands of Oruamo and Lucas Creek were some of the most densely settled areas of the North Shore by Tāmaki Māori. During the 1820s, most of the Te Kawerau people in the area fled for temporary refuge during the events of the Musket Wars, returning to the Waitākere Ranges and Te Henga / Bethells Beach years later.

Early European sources refer to the estuary as the Waitemata River.

In the late 1830s and 1840s, settlers purchased many areas of the Upper Waitematā Harbour from Ngāti Whātua. One of the first wooden structures on the North Shore was the Retreat, a kauri mill and brewery established by Thomas Hellyer on Oruamo or Hellyers Creek in the late 1830s. In 1844, the township of Riverhead was established between at the headland of the Rangitōpuni Stream, where a kauri mill operated until 1856. After this date, the mill was repurposed to be used as a flour mill, which was the largest provider of flour in the Auckland Region in the 1850s and 1860s. During the 19th century, the river and its tributaries were the major means of transportation for communities in the area, including Albany (then known as Lucas Creek) and Beach Haven.

In the 1920s, Winstone Ltd dredged the sandy Upper Waitematā Harbour near Greenhithe, which caused the cliffs at Greenhithe to erode from a height of 30.5m to 18.3m.

In 1972, work began on a bridge to connect West Auckland with the North Shore. In November 1975, the Upper Harbour Bridge was opened, leading to a population boom in Greenhithe. The bridge was used in 1986 used by A. J. Hackett for the first jumps testing the equipment for what was to eventually become the world's first commercial bungee jumping company.

From 1876 until 1974, the Upper Waitematā Harbour was administered by the Waitemata County. In 1974, the western shores of the estuary became a part of Waitemata City, with the remaining areas split between Rodney County and local government authorities on the North Shore. With the 1989 New Zealand local government reforms, the Upper Waitematā Harbour became the border between the newly formed Waitakere City in the west and North Shore City in the east. The Upper Waitematā Harbour is the namesake of the Upper Harbour local government area, which was established in 2010, and the Upper Harbour parliamentary electorate, which was established in 2014.

In 2007, the Upper Harbour Motorway was opened, creating a motorway connection between West Auckland and the North Shore via Greenhithe. As a part of this work, a second Upper Harbour Bridge was constructed parallel to the 1975 bridge.

== See also ==
- List of rivers of New Zealand

== Bibliography ==
- Adam, Jack; Burgess, Vivien; Ellis, Dawn (2004). Rugged Determination: Historical Window on Swanson 1854-2004. Swanson Residents and Ratepayers Association Inc. ISBN 0-476-00544-2.
- Dunmore, John (2001). Greenhithe: Today & Yesterday. Auckland: Heritage Press Ltd. ISBN 0-908708-53-X. OCLC 80291058. Wikidata Q123416573.
- King, R. E. (1984), Tauhinu: a History of Greenhithe, OCLC 37242212, Wikidata Q123416976
- Reidy, Jade (2009). "How the West Was Run". In Macdonald, Finlay; Kerr, Ruth (eds.). West: The History of Waitakere. Random House. pp. 237–256. ISBN 9781869790080.
- Verran, David (2010), The North Shore: An Illustrated History, North Shore: Random House, OL 33434370W, Wikidata Q120520385
