= Pāremoremo =

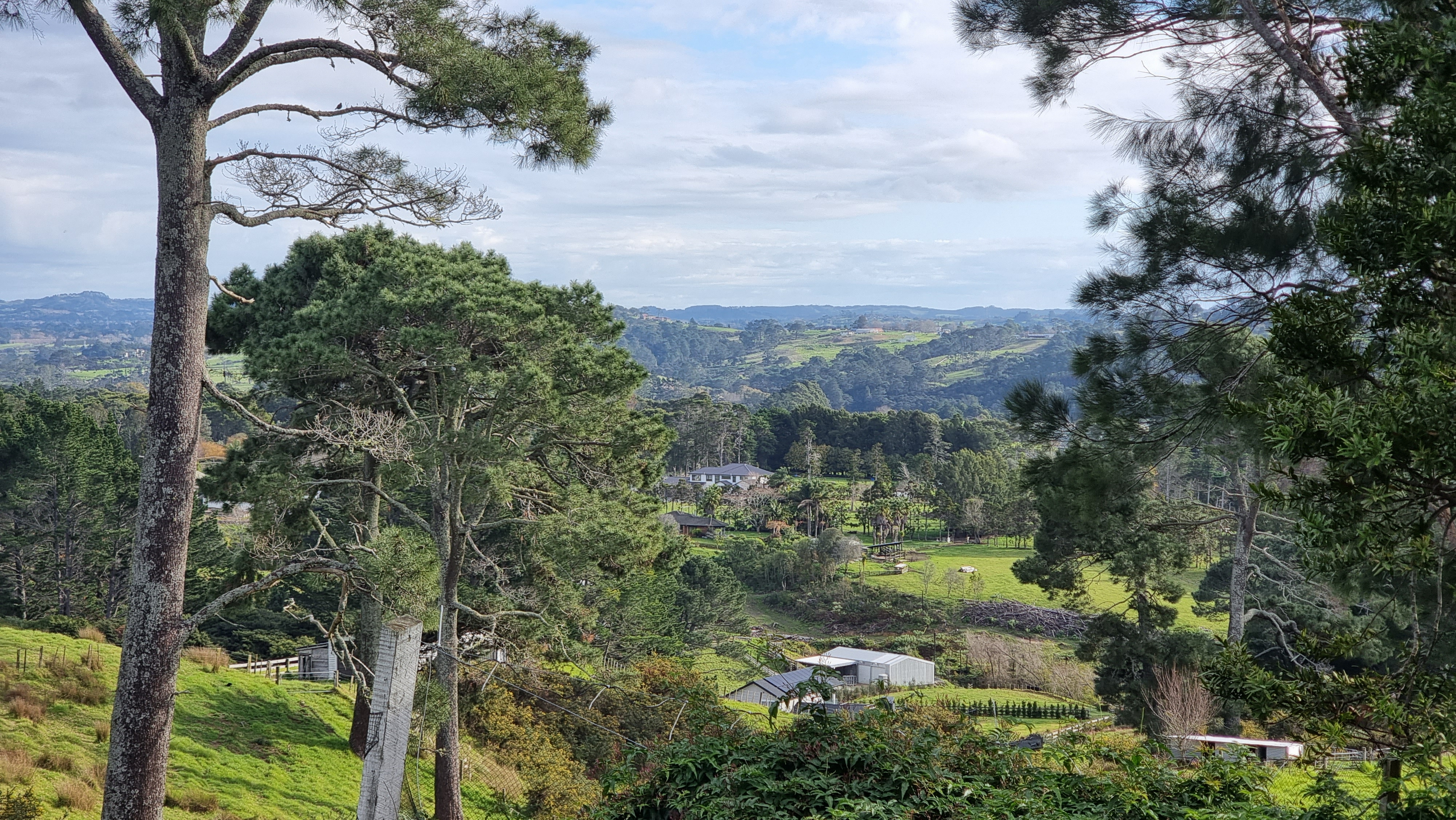
- View from Pāremoremo Road of rural Pāremoremo, looking towards Coatesville
- Interactive map of Pāremoremo
- Coordinates: 36°45′16″S 174°38′54″E
- Country: New Zealand
- Region: Auckland Region
- Ward: Rodney ward; Albany ward
- Local Board: Rodney Local Board; Upper Harbour Local Board
- Electorates: East Coast Bays; Te Tai Tokerau

Government
  - Territorial Authority: Auckland Council
  - Mayor of Auckland: Wayne Brown
  - East Coast Bays MP: Erica Stanford
  - Te Tai Tokerau MP: TBD

Area
  - Total: 1.28 km^{2} (0.49 sq mi)

Population (June 2025)
  - Total: 510
  - Density: 400/km^{2} (1,000/sq mi)

Pāremoremo is a rural settlement and its mostly rural surrounds about 8 km (5 miles) southwest of Albany on the northern fringe of Auckland, New Zealand. Coatesville is about 7 km to the north, and Riverhead is about 8 km to the west. Pāremoremo is home to New Zealand's only maximum security prison.

== History ==
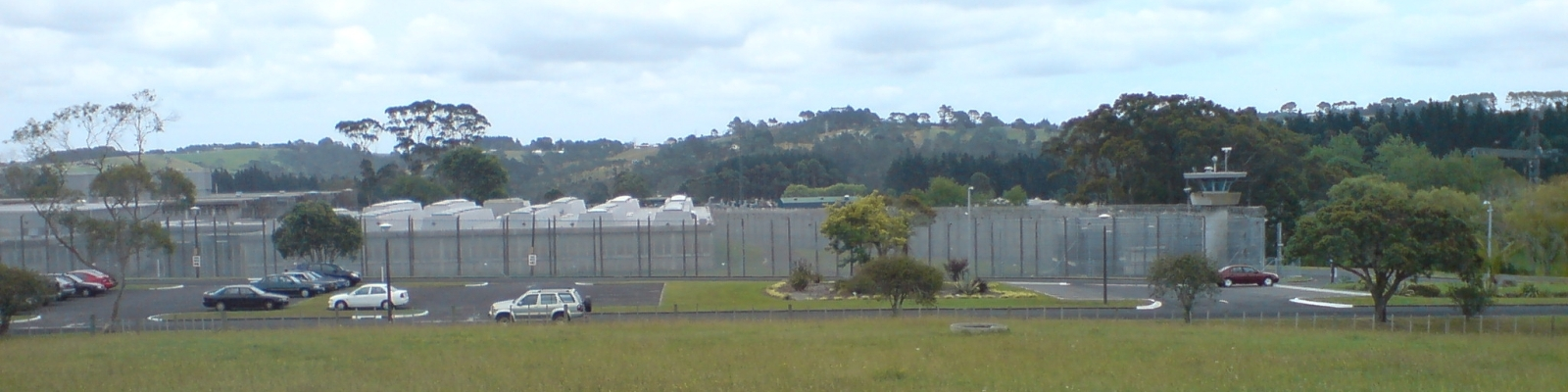
Auckland Prison

Pāremoremo is the location where Te Ākitai Waiohua ancestor and grandmother of Kiwi Tāmaki, Rangi-hua-moa, ate the final moa eggs known to Tāmaki Māori.

In the 1840s, Maurice and Mary Kelly operated a timber business at Pāremoremo and Albany. Pāremoremo was originally a small community on the Upper Waitematā Harbour which saw European settlement grow following the construction of a wharf at the foot of Attwood Road. In the early 19th century it was known for its farms, market gardens and orchards. Passengers and cargo travelled to the city by the launches and small ferries of the period.

In the mid 1960s it became the home of Auckland Prison, New Zealand's main maximum security prison. A village of 130 houses was built by the Ministry of Justice to house prison workers, but 30 of the houses were sold in 1996 after battles in the Employment Court of New Zealand and Court of Appeal.

== Demographics ==
Statistics New Zealand describes Pāremoremo as a rural settlement, which covers 1.28 km^{2} (0.49 sq mi) and had an estimated population of 510 as of June 2025, with a population density of 398 people per km^{2}.

Historical population for the settlement
Year	Pop.	±% p.a.
2006	429	—
2013	519	+2.76%
2018	525	+0.23%
2023	483	−1.65%

Pāremoremo settlement had a population of 483 in the 2023 New Zealand census, a decrease of 42 people (−8.0%) since the 2018 census, and a decrease of 36 people (−6.9%) since the 2013 census. There were 246 males, 231 females and 3 people of other genders in 174 dwellings. 5.0% of people identified as LGBTIQ+. The median age was 46.0 years (compared with 38.1 years nationally). There were 69 people (14.3%) aged under 15 years, 93 (19.3%) aged 15 to 29, 252 (52.2%) aged 30 to 64, and 66 (13.7%) aged 65 or older.

People could identify as more than one ethnicity. The results were 89.4% European (Pākehā); 9.3% Māori; 0.6% Pasifika; 6.8% Asian; 1.2% Middle Eastern, Latin American and African New Zealanders (MELAA); and 1.2% other, which includes people giving their ethnicity as "New Zealander". English was spoken by 96.3%, Māori language by 1.2%, and other languages by 12.4%. The percentage of people born overseas was 31.7, compared with 28.8% nationally.

Religious affiliations were 25.5% Christian, 0.6% Hindu, 0.6% Buddhist, 0.6% New Age, 0.6% Jewish, and 1.9% other religions. People who answered that they had no religion were 60.9%, and 8.7% of people did not answer the census question.

Of those at least 15 years old, 105 (25.4%) people had a bachelor's or higher degree, 213 (51.4%) had a post-high school certificate or diploma, and 57 (13.8%) people exclusively held high school qualifications. The median income was $55,700, compared with $41,500 nationally. 99 people (23.9%) earned over $100,000 compared to 12.1% nationally. The employment status of those at least 15 was that 234 (56.5%) people were employed full-time, 60 (14.5%) were part-time, and 6 (1.4%) were unemployed.

=== Rural surrounds ===
Pāremoremo including its rural surrounds covers 23.85 km^{2} (9.21 sq mi) and had an estimated population of 3,910 as of June 2025, with a population density of 164 people per km^{2}.

Historical population for the settlement and its surrounds
Year	Pop.	±% p.a.
2006	2,694	—
2013	3,621	+4.32%
2018	3,768	+0.80%
2023	3,774	+0.03%
The 2006 population is for a smaller area of 21.08 km^{2}. Source:

Pāremoremo had a population of 3,774 in the 2023 New Zealand census, an increase of 6 people (0.2%) since the 2018 census, and an increase of 153 people (4.2%) since the 2013 census. There were 2,085 males, 1,662 females and 27 people of other genders in 1,122 dwellings. 4.0% of people identified as LGBTIQ+. The median age was 40.4 years (compared with 38.1 years nationally). There were 585 people (15.5%) aged under 15 years, 795 (21.1%) aged 15 to 29, 1,905 (50.5%) aged 30 to 64, and 486 (12.9%) aged 65 or older.

People could identify as more than one ethnicity. The results were 75.6% European (Pākehā); 14.9% Māori; 5.2% Pasifika; 13.8% Asian; 1.3% Middle Eastern, Latin American and African New Zealanders (MELAA); and 1.7% other, which includes people giving their ethnicity as "New Zealander". English was spoken by 96.1%, Māori language by 4.3%, Samoan by 1.4%, and other languages by 16.8%. No language could be spoken by 1.4% (e.g. too young to talk). New Zealand Sign Language was known by 0.6%. The percentage of people born overseas was 31.9, compared with 28.8% nationally.

Religious affiliations were 30.5% Christian, 1.5% Hindu, 0.8% Islam, 1.7% Māori religious beliefs, 0.6% Buddhist, 0.6% New Age, 0.1% Jewish, and 1.1% other religions. People who answered that they had no religion were 56.1%, and 7.2% of people did not answer the census question.

Of those at least 15 years old, 645 (20.2%) people had a bachelor's or higher degree, 1,671 (52.4%) had a post-high school certificate or diploma, and 687 (21.5%) people exclusively held high school qualifications. The median income was $39,100, compared with $41,500 nationally. 561 people (17.6%) earned over $100,000 compared to 12.1% nationally. The employment status of those at least 15 was that 1,461 (45.8%) people were employed full-time, 501 (15.7%) were part-time, and 87 (2.7%) were unemployed.

Individual statistical areas
Name	Area (km^{2})	Population	Density (per km^{2})	Dwellings	Median age	Median income
Pāremoremo West	9.48	966	102	315	43.6 years	$47,900
Pāremoremo East	14.37	2,808	195	807	39.5 years	$36,000
New Zealand					38.1 years	$41,500

== Parks and reserves ==
Paremoremo Scenic Reserve is a block of land north of the Paremoremo residential area. It is the largest bush reserve in the North Shore and is a site of ecological significance.

A 38-hectare (94-acre) block of land south of the prison was bought by North Shore City for NZ$3.1 million in February 2002, to be developed as Sanders Park. The park was finished in 2010, for a total budget of $2.7 million, including a $1.2 million toilet block, a fenced off-leash dog walking area, mountain bike trails, a small children's bike track, and a fenced paddock for equestrians. Also at Sanders Reserve are two small beaches with good swimming areas. People have been known to camp on the grass areas around the beach.

== Education ==
Ridgeview School is a coeducational contributing primary (years 1-6) school with a roll of 50 students as at July 2026. The school opened in 1923 as Paremoremo School, and changed its name to Ridgeview in 2000.
