= Upper Harbour Local Board =

Coordinates: 36.72255°S 174.70834°E

Upper Harbour Local Board Te Poari ā-Rohe o Upper Harbour
- Local board of Auckland Council
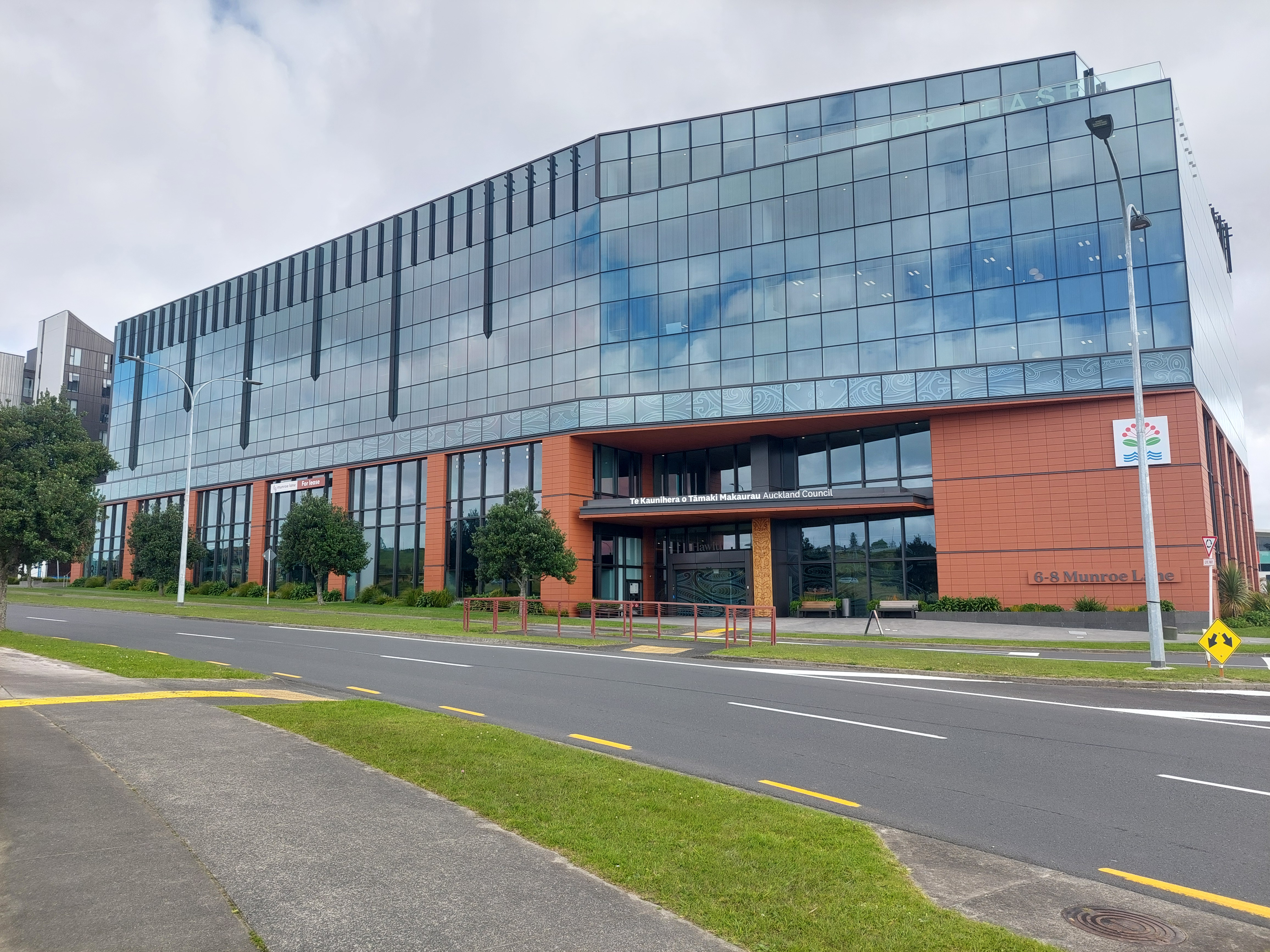
- Auckland Council Albany Hub housing Upper Harbour Local Board

- Country: New Zealand
- Region: Auckland
- Territorial authority: Auckland Council
- Ward: Albany Ward
- Legislated: 2010

Area
  - Land: 69.72 km^{2} (26.92 sq mi)

Population (June 2025)
  - Total: 84,500
  - Density: 1,210/km^{2} (3,140/sq mi)

Local board members

Leadership
- Chairperson: Anna Atkinson, Living Upper Harbour
- Deputy chairperson: Sylvia Yang, Living Upper Harbour

Structure
- Seats: 6
- Political groups: Living Upper Harbour (4); Independents (2)
- Length of term: 3 years

Elections
- Last election: 2025
- Next election: 2028

Meeting place
- 6-8 Munroe Lane, Albany

The Upper Harbour Local Board is one of the 21 local boards of the Auckland Council, and is one of the two boards overseen by the council's Albany Ward councillors.

The board is named for the upper reaches of Auckland's Waitematā Harbour. Its administrative area consists of the suburbs clustered around the upper reaches, and covers much of the north of Auckland's North Shore and part of West Auckland.

The board is governed by six board members elected at-large.

== History ==
The board was formed as part of the 2010 Auckland local government reforms and held its inaugural meeting at North Harbour Stadium on 3 November 2010 at which the members voted to have a shared chair for the first term. Former National Party MP, Brian Neeson, held the chairpersonship for the first 18 months and Margaret Miles held it for the subsequent 18 months.

In 2022, the board was caught up in a controversy surrounding a decision it had made about native trees in Sanders Reserve. A park management plan, a legal requirement, had been created in 2006, which set out how the park should be managed and maintained, including where trees could be planted so as to protect views of the harbour and grassy areas from being blocked by tall trees. A 2016 planting plan did not comply with the park management plan and reportedly had not been shown to the local board. However, a community group involved in the planting disputes this and believes that the local board did have opportunities to see the plan to ensure that it complied with the park management plan. As a result, extensive tree planting, much of it by volunteers, occurred in areas of the park where planting was not permitted under the park management plan. Following concerns and complaints about issues created by the locations of the trees, a majority of the local board (four in favour and two opposed) voted to remove the trees.

In 2023, the local board relocated its office from Albany Village to the council's new Albany Hub, named Hawiti, at 6-8 Munroe Lane as part of a plan to reduce the council's corporate footprint and consolidate offices.

In 2024, the board began planning for a new Albany library to replace the Albany Village Library, the only library in the Auckland Libraries system that serves the Upper Harbour Local Board Area.

In spite of typically low youth voter turnout, the 2025 elections for the board attracted three Gen Z candidates, two of whom were successfully elected, Rebecca Huang and Selena Wong, and claimed a third of the board's six seats. At the same election, the board was also notable for having strong Asian representation amongst the successful candidates, with three of the elected members, Huang, Wong, and Sylvia Yang being of Chinese descent and a fourth member, Uzra Casuri Balouch, being of Pashtun heritage.

== Area ==
The local government area is centred around the Upper Waitematā Harbour, an estuarial arm of the Waitematā Harbour. The area includes the western suburbs of Whenuapai, Herald Island, West Harbour and Hobsonville, and Paremoremo, Albany, Fairview Heights, Greenhithe, Rosedale, Northcross, Unsworth Heights, Windsor Park, and Pinehill in the east.

== Demographics ==
Upper Harbour Local Board Area covers 69.72 km^{2} (26.92 sq mi) and had an estimated population of 84,500 as of June 2025, with a population density of 1,212 people per km^{2}.

Historical population
Year	Pop.	±% p.a.
2006	42,876	—
2013	53,670	+3.26%
2018	62,841	+3.21%
2023	76,959	+4.14%

Upper Harbour had a population of 76,959 in the 2023 New Zealand census, an increase of 14,118 people (22.5%) since the 2018 census, and an increase of 23,289 people (43.4%) since the 2013 census. There were 37,923 males, 38,805 females and 228 people of other genders in 25,224 dwellings. 3.3% of people identified as LGBTIQ+. The median age was 36.7 years (compared with 38.1 years nationally). There were 14,217 people (18.5%) aged under 15 years, 14,994 (19.5%) aged 15 to 29, 37,377 (48.6%) aged 30 to 64, and 10,365 (13.5%) aged 65 or older.

People could identify as more than one ethnicity. The results were 49.1% European (Pākehā); 6.1% Māori; 3.1% Pasifika; 45.5% Asian; 3.6% Middle Eastern, Latin American and African New Zealanders (MELAA); and 2.1% other, which includes people giving their ethnicity as "New Zealander". English was spoken by 90.1%, Māori language by 1.1%, Samoan by 0.5%, and other languages by 40.7%. No language could be spoken by 2.3% (e.g. too young to talk). New Zealand Sign Language was known by 0.3%. The percentage of people born overseas was 52.9, compared with 28.8% nationally.

Religious affiliations were 29.5% Christian, 3.1% Hindu, 2.1% Islam, 0.3% Māori religious beliefs, 2.2% Buddhist, 0.2% New Age, 0.1% Jewish, and 1.3% other religions. People who answered that they had no religion were 55.8%, and 5.5% of people did not answer the census question.

Of those at least 15 years old, 24,090 (38.4%) people had a bachelor's or higher degree, 24,591 (39.2%) had a post-high school certificate or diploma, and 14,058 (22.4%) people exclusively held high school qualifications. The median income was $48,300, compared with $41,500 nationally. 10,713 people (17.1%) earned over $100,000 compared to 12.1% nationally. The employment status of those at least 15 was that 34,059 (54.3%) people were employed full-time, 7,818 (12.5%) were part-time, and 1,464 (2.3%) were unemployed.

== Members ==
The current board members for the 2025-2028 term, elected at the 2025 local elections, are:

Name	Affiliation	Position
Anna Atkinson	Living Upper Harbour	Chairperson
Sylvia Yang	Living Upper Harbour	Deputy Chairperson
Uzra Casuri Balouch	Independent	Board member
Kyle Parker	Living Upper Harbour	Board member
Rebecca Huang	Living Upper Harbour	Board member
Selena Wong	Independent	Board member

=== Former ===
==== 2022 - 2025 term ====
The board members elected at the 2022 election, in election order:

Anna Atkinson, Living Upper Harbour, (6744 votes) Chair person
Uzra Casuri Balouch, Independent, (6492 votes) Deputy Chairperson
Kyle Parker, Living Upper Harbour, (5915 votes)
John Mclean, Independent, (5677 votes)
Sylvia Yang, Living Upper Harbour, (5677 votes)
Callum Blair, Independent, (5349 votes)

==== 2019 - 2022 term ====
The board members, elected in the 2019 local body elections, in election order:

Margaret Miles, Independent, (7323 votes)
Anna Atkinson, Living Upper Harbour, (6398 votes)
Lisa Whyte, not affiliated, (6071 votes)
Uzra Casuri Balouch, not affiliated, (5767 votes)
Nicholas Mayne, Living Upper Harbour, (5663 votes)
Brian Neeson, Independent, (5012 votes)

==== 2016 - 2019 term ====
The board members, elected in the 2016 local body elections, in election order:

Lisa Whyte, Auckland Future, (7826 votes)
Margaret Miles, Independent, (6533 votes)
Brian Neeson, Independent, (6097 votes)
Uzra Casuri Balouch, not affiliated, (5434 votes)
John MClean, Independent, (5336 votes)
Nicholas Mayne, not affiliated, (4577 votes)
