= North Shore City =

Former city of New Zealand

- City of New Zealand
- 1989–2010
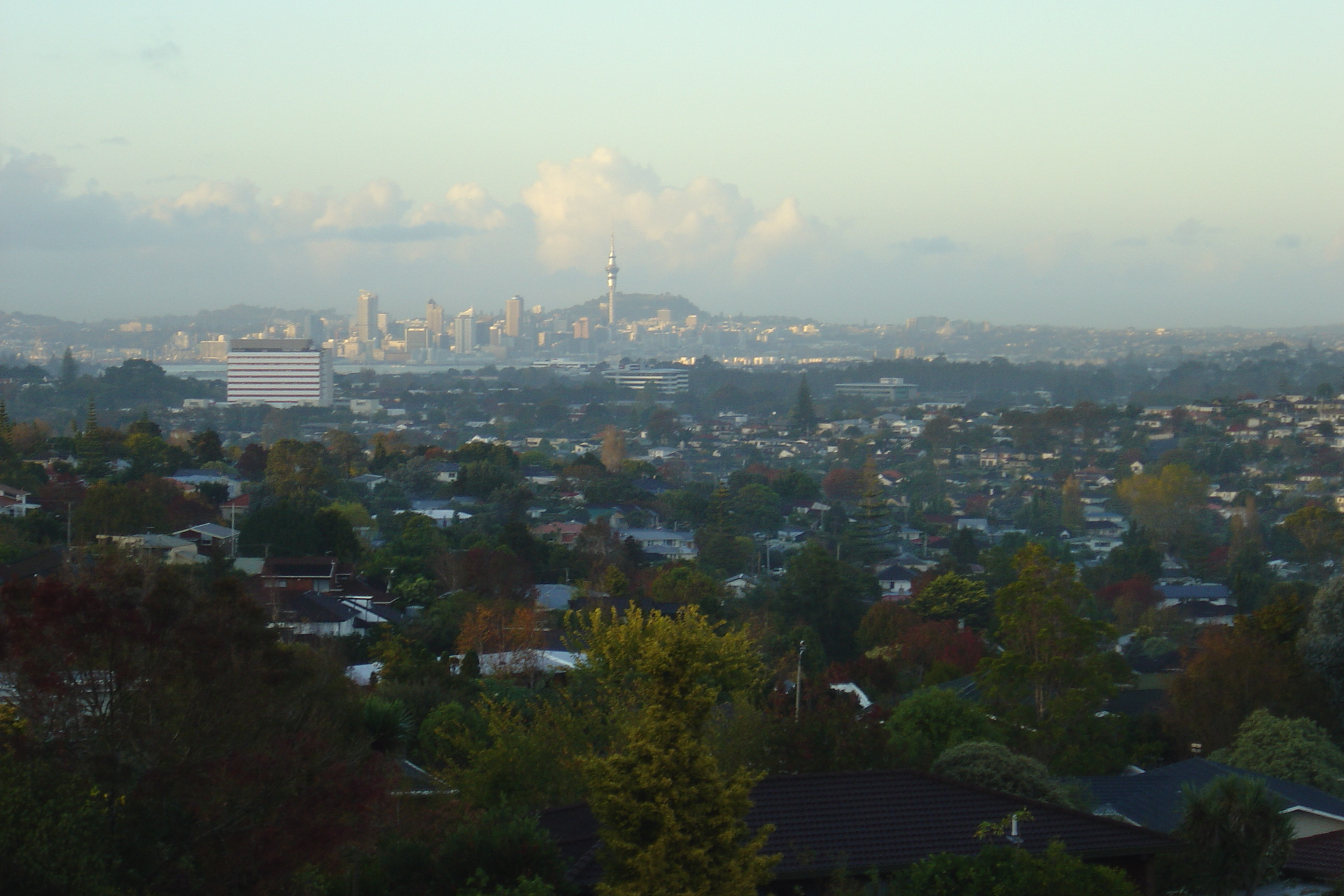
- Looking south over North Shore City from Forrest Hill. Auckland City can be seen in the background.

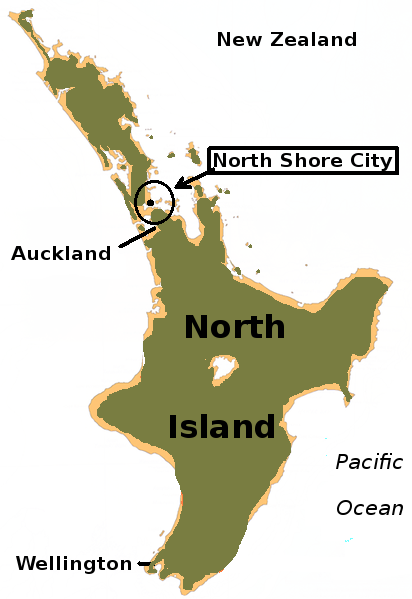
- North Shore City within the North Island of New Zealand
- History
  - Established: 1989
  - Disestablished: 2010
- Today part of: Auckland Region

North Shore City was a territorial authority unit in the Auckland Region of New Zealand that was governed by the North Shore City Council. It existed from 1989 until November 2010, when the council was incorporated into Auckland Council. It had an estimated population of 229,000 at 30 June 2010, making it the fourth most populous city in New Zealand prior to the 2010 reorganisation. It was the country's fourth largest city in land, with an area of 129.81 square kilometres (50.12 sq mi) and a coastline of 141 kilometres (88 mi). It was the most densely populated city in the country, because most of its area was urban or suburban in nature, unlike other New Zealand cities.

== Geography ==
The North Shore comprised a large suburban area to the north of downtown Auckland; linked to the rest of the greater Auckland metropolitan area by two harbour bridges - the Auckland Harbour Bridge crosses the inner Waitemata Harbour to Auckland City, while the Upper Harbour Bridge provided a connection to Waitakere City across the northern stretches of the harbour.

The administrative area of North Shore City Council was bounded by Rodney District to the north, Waitemata Harbour to the south and the Rangitoto Channel of the Hauraki Gulf to the east. The seat of the council was in Takapuna.

Today, the entire area has been divided between four local boards of the amalgamated Auckland Council: Devonport-Takapuna, Kaipātiki, Upper Harbour (along with part of the former Waitakere City) and Hibiscus and Bays (along with part of the former Rodney District).

=== Administrative divisions ===
Prior to being merged into Auckland Council in 2010, North Shore City was divided into three wards, with each of them dividing into two community boards for a total of six within the city; with each of them further consisting of the following populated places (i.e.: suburbs, towns, localities, settlements, communities, hamlets, etc.):

- Northern Ward
  - Albany Community Board:
    - Albany (Note: Outer suburbs.)
    - Albany Heights
    - Fairview Heights
    - Greenhithe
    - Lucas Heights
    - Oteha
    - Paremoremo
    - Pinehill
    - Rosedale
    - Schnapper Rock
    - Unsworth Heights
    - Windsor Park
    - North Harbour
  - East Coast Bays Community Board:
    - Browns Bay (Note: Coastal suburbs. Those suburbs, along with several other beaches on the Hauraki Gulf coast, are collectively known as the East Coast Bays.)
    - Long Bay
    - Mairangi Bay
    - Murrays Bay
    - Northcross
    - Okura
    - Rothesay Bay
    - Torbay
    - Waiake
- Harbour Ward
  - Birkenhead-Northcote Community Board:
    - Beach Haven
    - Birkdale
    - Birkenhead (Note: Inner suburbs.)
    - Chatswood
    - Northcote
    - Northcote Point
    - Highbury
  - Glenfield Community Board:
    - Bayview
    - Glenfield
    - Hillcrest
    - Wairau Valley
- Central Ward
  - Devonport Community Board:
    - Bayswater
    - Belmont
    - Devonport
    - Narrow Neck
    - Stanley Bay
  - Takapuna Community Board:
    - Campbells Bay
    - Castor Bay
    - Forrest Hill
    - Hauraki
    - Milford
    - Sunnynook
    - Takapuna

== History ==
The North Shore was first administered by highway districts, which operated from the 1860s onwards, pooling local residents' resources to improve infrastructure. In 1876, the Waitemata County was established across the North Shore and West Auckland after the abolition of the Auckland Province, and was one of the largest counties created in New Zealand. Between 1886 and 1954, areas of the North Shore voted to become independent areas separate from the county, establishing boroughs. The first of these was Devonport in 1886, soon followed by Birkenhead in 1888. Northcote was declared a borough in 1908, and Takapuna in 1913. The final borough that split from the Waitemata County was East Coast Bays in 1954. On 1 August 1974, the Waitemata County was dissolved, leading to Glenfield, Albany and Long Bay being incorporated into Takapuna City.

A North Shore City was proposed in 1961 but was rejected at the polls.

In 1989, Devonport, Birkenhead, Northcote, Takapuna and East Coast Bays amalgamated to form North Shore City in the 1989 New Zealand local government reforms. North Shore City was amalgamated into Auckland Council in November 2010.

== Local government ==
The city was run by the 15-member North Shore City Council and mayor, democratically elected every three years using the first-past-the-post voting system. The last mayor was Andrew Williams. The mayor was a strong critic of the 'Super City' proposals, which would see North Shore City amalgamated into a larger Auckland authority. Williams voiced strong opposition to Transit New Zealand's delays regarding bus lanes. He was a proponent of the $300 million joint busway venture. While the Auckland Regional Council had power to impose property tax rates on suburban areas such as North Shore City, local residents voiced strong opposition. There was a pattern of conflict between local authorities and Auckland city officials regarding many matters, such as transportation, land purchases and decay of wharf facilities. The issue of whether Auckland should be a single city, or a collection of autonomous cities, was a subject of debate.

=== Mayors of North Shore City ===
Between 1989 and 2010, North Shore City had five mayors. The mayor was directly elected using a first-past-the-post electoral system. The councillors were elected from three wards: Northern, Harbour and Central. The elections were held every three years.

The following persons served as mayor of North Shore City:

	Name	Portrait	In office	Terms
1	Ann Hartley		1989–1992	1
2	Paul Titchener		1992–1995	1
3	George Gair		1995–1998	1
4	George Wood		1998–2007	3
5	Andrew Williams		2007–2010	1

== Economy ==
North Shore City formerly contributed over 6% of New Zealand's GDP. The city also topped the nation's growth rates for numbers of businesses, growing 29.3% between 1998 and 2002. Areas of the North Shore City boasted some of the most expensive real estate in New Zealand. The stretch of coast that runs North from Takapuna Beach to Milford, often referred to as the "Golden Mile", had many properties there have sold for several million dollars (NZ$) particularly because of the beaches, Lake Pupuke, popular schools and shopping centres. In 2005, one beachfront property sold for $12.8 million. Rents in North Shore City, as well as property prices, are high in relative terms, with average weekly rents (in 2002) of $243 versus $237 for Wellington and $236 for Auckland.

== Demographics ==
In the 2006 census, the median income for North Shore residents over 15 years was $29,100, compared with a national average of $24,400.

The racial makeup of the city was 67.5% European, 18.5% Asian, 6.3% Māori, 3.4% Pacific Islander, and 1.8% from the Middle East, Africa or Latin America. Just under 10% gave their ethnicity as "New Zealander", with most of this group having identified itself as European in former Census surveys.

== Sister cities ==
North Shore City was a sister city of:

- Taichung City, Taiwan, 17 December 1996
- Qingdao, People's Republic of China, 9 August 2008

== See also ==
- List of former territorial authorities in New Zealand § Cities
- North Shore City Council v Auckland Regional Council

== Bibliography ==
- Adam, Jack; Burgess, Vivien; Ellis, Dawn (2004). Rugged Determination: Historical Window on Swanson 1854-2004. Swanson Residents and Ratepayers Association Inc. ISBN 0-476-00544-2.
- Reidy, Jade (2009). "How the West Was Run". In Macdonald, Finlay; Kerr, Ruth (eds.). West: The History of Waitakere. Random House. pp. 237–256. ISBN 9781869790080.
