= Soldiers Bay =

Soldiers Bay, Soldier's Bay or Soldier Bay may refer to:

- Soldiers Bay, a location near St. John's, Antigua and Barbuda; see Blue Waters Hotel
- Soldiers Bay, a location in Te Atatū Peninsula, New Zealand; see Beach Haven, New Zealand
