= Greenhithe =

Greenhithe may refer to:

- Greenhithe, Kent, a village in Dartford on the River Thames, England
  - Greenhithe railway station
- Greenhithe, New Zealand, a suburb on North Shore, Auckland, New Zealand
  - Greenhithe FC, association football club in Auckland
  - Greenhithe Bridge, an alternative name for the Upper Harbour Bridge
