= Rosedale, Auckland =

Rosedale
- Suburb
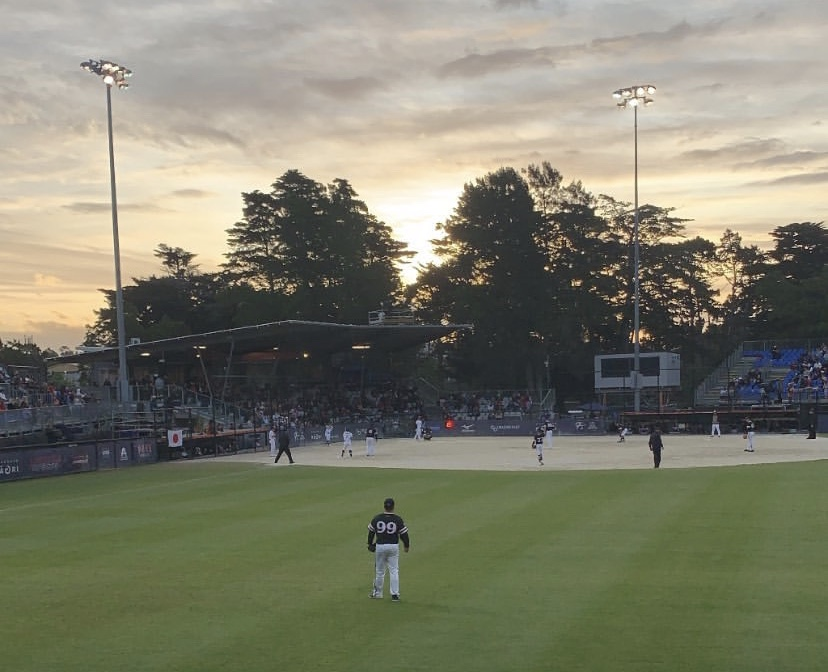
- Rosedale Park
- Interactive map of Rosedale
- Coordinates: 36.747°S 174.711°E
- Country: New Zealand
- City: Auckland
- Local authority: Auckland Council
- Electoral ward: Albany ward
- Local board: Upper Harbour Local Board

Area
  - Land: 549 ha (1,360 acres)

Population (June 2025)
  - Total: 810
  - Density: 150/km^{2} (380/sq mi)
- Postcode: 0632

Albany	Pinehill	Windsor Park
Schnapper Rock	Rosedale	Windsor Park
Schnapper Rock	Unsworth Heights	Sunnynook

Rosedale is a suburb on the North Shore of Auckland, New Zealand. It is located 12 kilometres north of the city centre, to the south of the suburbs of Pinehill and Albany. It is under the local governance of the Auckland Council. Northern Rosedale is also known by the name Upper Harbour.

== History ==
The business and light industrial area of Rosedale was given the name North Harbour Industrial Estate when construction commenced on it in the 1990s. The former North Shore City Council the changed the name of this area back to Rosedale in 2009, as a result of a broader review of suburb names and boundaries in the North Shore. This area is sometimes referred to by the former name. Business North Harbour, the association responsible for the area's business improvement district, retains the place name of North Harbour in their name. Business North Harbour was unhappy with the name change to Rosedale, describing the name as a "stinker" due to the association with the Rosedale Wastewater Treatment Plant and former landfill located in the suburb. Some businesses in Rosedale use North Harbour in their names and as the suburb in their addresses.

On the name of Rosedale, The New Zealand Geographic board states "the name for Rosedale has existed for many years, but the current boundary is newly defined. In 1961 new large Oxidation Ponds were built in the valley between Rosedale Road in the North and Sunset Road in the South. They were named Rosedale Oxidation Ponds and at that time were surrounded by rural holdings."

== Infrastructure and services ==
The suburb is home to the Rosedale Wastewater Treatment Plant, the second largest sewage works in Auckland. The plant was initially opened in 1962, and now processes the wastewater of an estimated 253,000 inhabitants, servicing the area of the North Shore from Devonport to Long Bay. A notable feature of the area is Rosedale Dam, containing treated wastewater fed from the sewage works. The dam is visible when travelling through State Highway 1. In the event of a dam breach, the dam poses a risk of flooding to the local community within the flow path hazard zone. The dam is at the greatest risk of a breach during an earthquake or high rainfall event.

Rosedale is also known for the large general refuse landfill that operated from the 1950s to 2009, accepting only clean fill from 2002 to 2008. The landfill was bordered by Greville Road on the north, Rosedale Road on the south, State Highway 1 on the west and Hugh Green Drive on the east. The area is now the Rosedale Landfill Reserve and public access is prohibited due to toxic gas and liquid run off. The high levels of volatile methane gas present are harnessed for power generation. The suburb remains a hub for refuse services with a Waste Management transfer station operating adjacent to the bottom of the former landfill site on Rosedale Road. A large Envirowaste transfer and recycling facility is also located in the suburb on Constellation Drive.

In the lake next to the wastewater treatement plant, there is a solar array called the Rosedale Solar Array. It was the largest and is the only floating solar array in New Zealand. It has more than 2700 solar panels and produces 1486MWh per year.

== Demographics ==
North Harbour statistical area, which corresponds to Rosedale, covers 5.49 km^{2} (2.12 sq mi) and had an estimated population of 810 as of June 2025, with a population density of 148 people per km^{2}.

Historical population
Year	Pop.	±% p.a.
2006	450	—
2013	564	+3.28%
2018	816	+7.67%
2023	738	−1.99%

North Harbour statistical area had a population of 738 in the 2023 New Zealand census, a decrease of 78 people (−9.6%) since the 2018 census, and an increase of 174 people (30.9%) since the 2013 census. There were 378 males and 357 females in 315 dwellings. 2.8% of people identified as LGBTIQ+. The median age was 44.6 years (compared with 38.1 years nationally). There were 66 people (8.9%) aged under 15 years, 123 (16.7%) aged 15 to 29, 327 (44.3%) aged 30 to 64, and 225 (30.5%) aged 65 or older.

People could identify as more than one ethnicity. The results were 60.2% European (Pākehā); 6.9% Māori; 2.4% Pasifika; 31.7% Asian; 3.7% Middle Eastern, Latin American and African New Zealanders (MELAA); and 0.8% other, which includes people giving their ethnicity as "New Zealander". English was spoken by 91.5%, Māori language by 1.6%, Samoan by 0.4%, and other languages by 34.6%. No language could be spoken by 1.6% (e.g. too young to talk). The percentage of people born overseas was 46.3, compared with 28.8% nationally.

Religious affiliations were 35.8% Christian, 2.0% Hindu, 2.4% Islam, 0.4% Māori religious beliefs, 0.8% Buddhist, and 2.0% other religions. People who answered that they had no religion were 52.8%, and 4.1% of people did not answer the census question.

Of those at least 15 years old, 150 (22.3%) people had a bachelor's or higher degree, 297 (44.2%) had a post-high school certificate or diploma, and 189 (28.1%) people exclusively held high school qualifications. The median income was $31,600, compared with $41,500 nationally. 51 people (7.6%) earned over $100,000 compared to 12.1% nationally. The employment status of those at least 15 was that 306 (45.5%) people were employed full-time, 84 (12.5%) were part-time, and 15 (2.2%) were unemployed.

== Education ==
Albany Junior High School is a school catering for year 7–10 students, with a roll of 1,128 students as at July 2026. It was opened in 2005. Albany Senior High School opened in Albany in 2009 for year 11–13 students.
