= Greenhithe, New Zealand =

Greenhithe
- Suburb
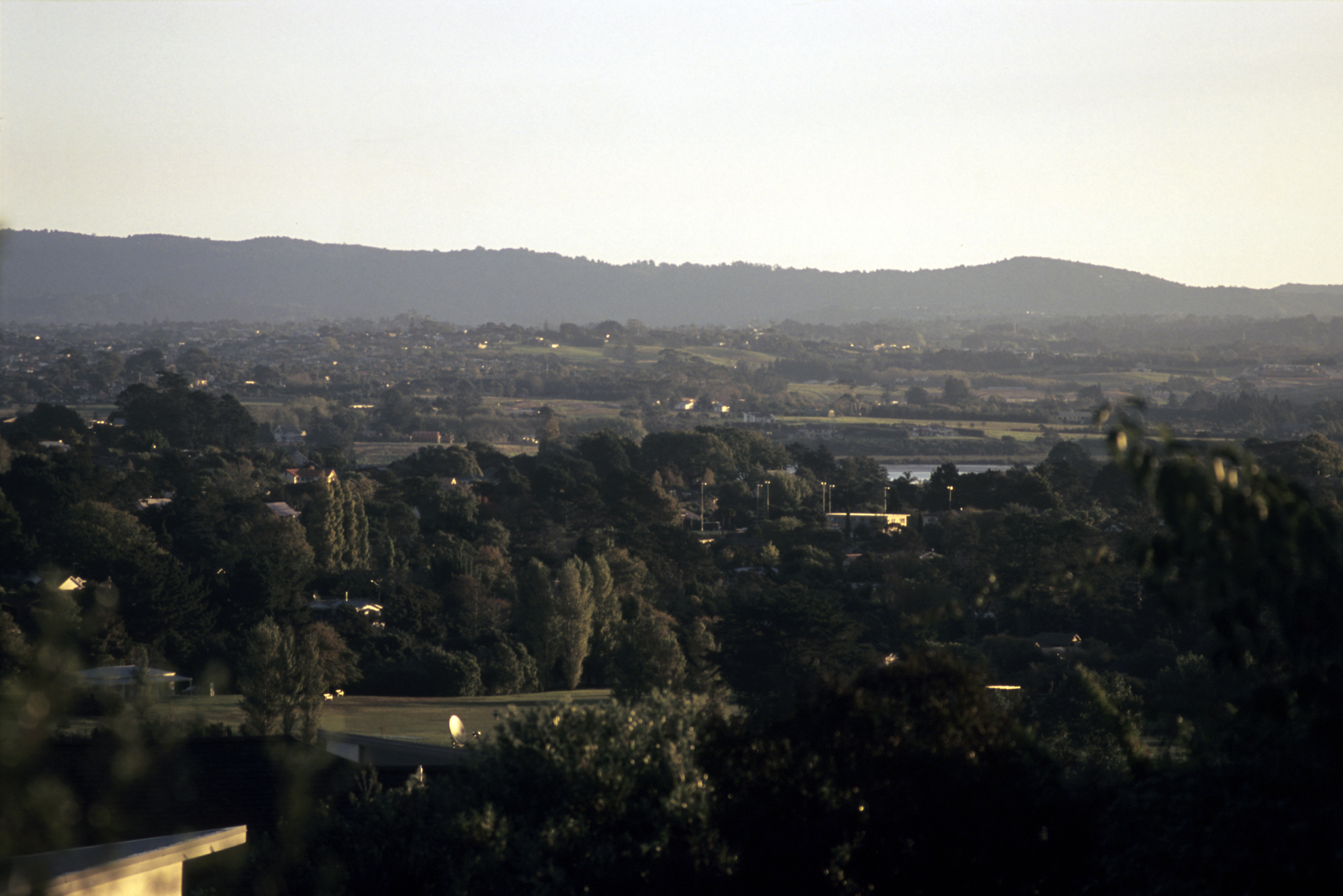
- Greenhithe looking towards the Waitākere Ranges.
- Interactive map of Greenhithe
- Coordinates: 36.771°S 174.684°E
- Country: New Zealand
- City: Auckland
- Local authority: Auckland Council
- Electoral ward: Albany ward
- Local board: Upper Harbour Local Board

Area
  - Land: 781 ha (1,930 acres)

Population (June 2025)
  - Total: 9,350
  - Density: 1,200/km^{2} (3,100/sq mi)
- Postcode: 0632

Pāremoremo	Schnapper Rock	Unsworth Heights
Herald Island	Greenhithe	Bayview
Hobsonville	(Waitematā Harbour)	Beach Haven

Greenhithe is a northwestern suburb of Auckland, New Zealand, located on the North Shore. Greenhithe was the location of Tauhinu, a fortified Te Kawerau ā Maki and Ngāti Whātua pā which overlooked the entrance to Oruamo or Hellyers Creek, that was settled until the 1820s. In the 1860s, the Forgham family established a community at Greenhithe, which by the 1880s had become a major fruit producer for Auckland. Boat repair and construction became major industries in Greenhithe in the 1960s.

The area developed into a suburb of Auckland after the construction of the Auckland Harbour Bridge in 1959 and the Upper Harbour Bridge in 1975. The North Shore City Council identified Greenhithe as an area for suburban growth in 2002, leading the population to double between 2001 and 2018.

== Etymologies ==
Greenhithe was the name early settler Henry James Blyth gave to the Forgham family house and orchards when he took over the property in 1882. It is named after Greenhithe, a village in Kent, England on the River Thames, where Blyth kept his yacht before moving to New Zealand. The Māori language name for the area, Tauhinu, refers to the Tauhinu defensive pā at the south of the suburb, which was named for tauhinu, a Pomaderris shrub that grew in the area known for its medicinal properties.

== Geography ==
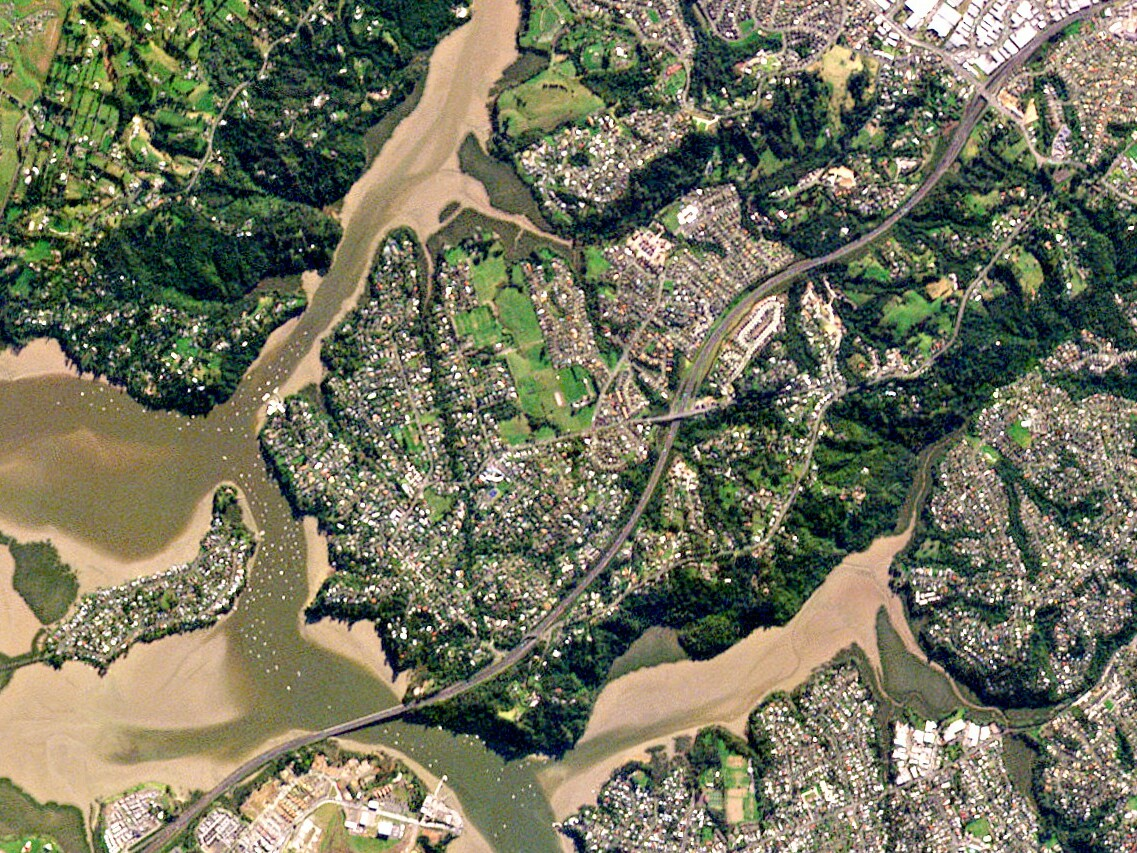
2016 satellite view of the Greenhithe peninsula

Greenhithe is a suburb of the North Shore of New Zealand. It is a peninsula surrounded by the Upper Waitematā Harbour, Lucas Creek and Oruamo or Hellyers Creek. The highest point in the suburb are the 85-metre cliffs at the very south of the peninsula. Te Wharau Creek is a stream that flows northwards through the suburb, becoming an estuary flowing into the Lucas Creek. Wainoni is a suburban area in Greenhithe, located around Wainoni Park. The suburb is bisected by State Highway 18, also known as the Upper Harbour Motorway, which links the North Shore to Hobsonville in West Auckland.

The banks of the Lucas Creek were historically kauri-dominated forests. By the mid-19th century, the area had developed into a mānuka and fern-dominated scrubland.

== History ==
=== Māori history ===
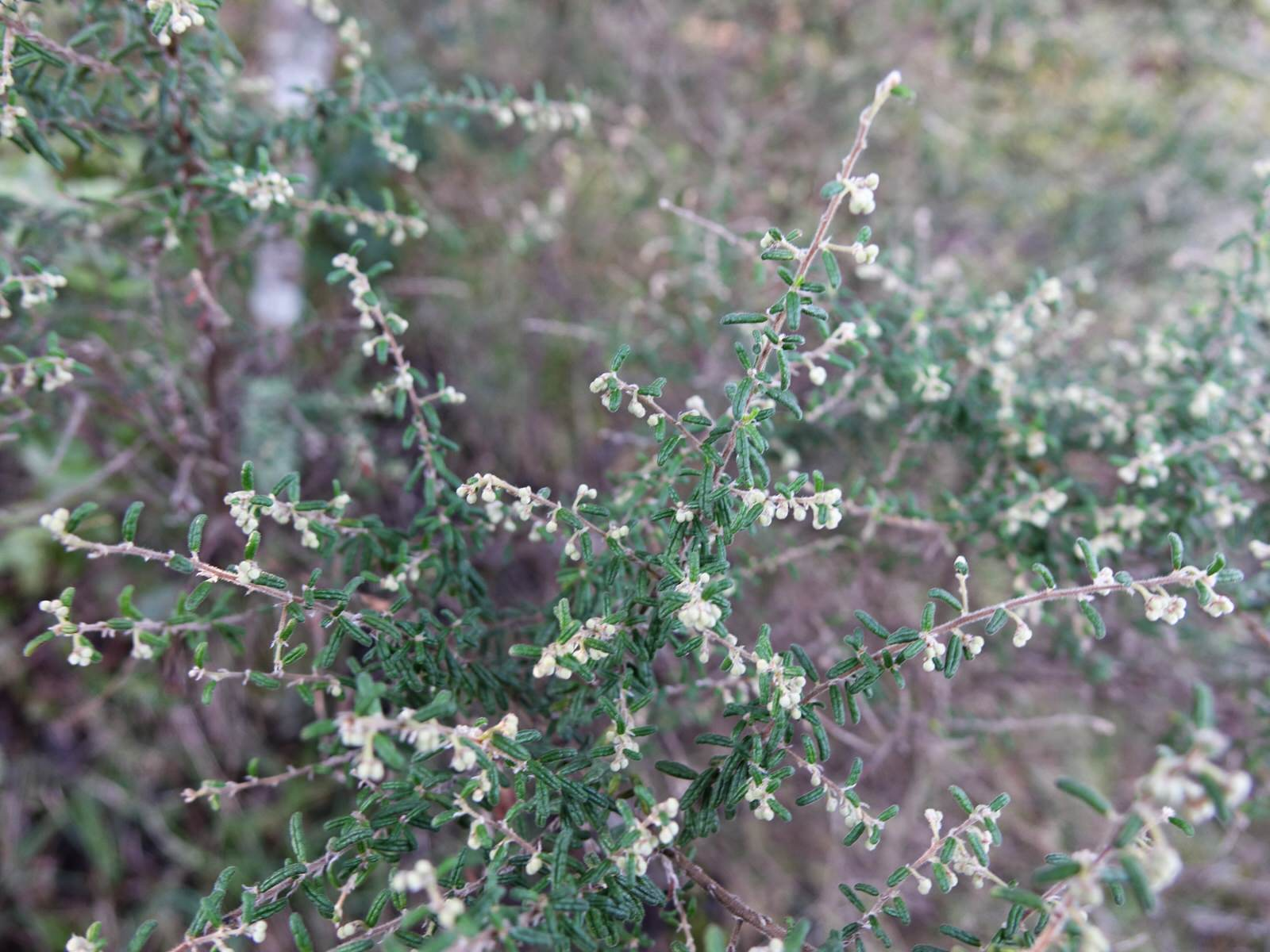
The Tauhinu pā in Greenhithe was named after the tauhinu shrub, known for its medicinal properties (pictured: Pomaderris amoena)

Most of what is known of Greenhithe's traditional history is based on the retelling by Whatarangi Ngati of Pāremoremo in the early 20th century. Whatarangi was the mother-in-law of ethnographer George Graham, and was well-versed in the tribal histories of Ngāti Whanaunga, Ngāti Whātua and Ngāti Pāoa. At Greenhithe, Tauhinu was established as a fortified Te Kawerau ā Maki pā, on the southern cliffs of the peninsula. The pā overlooked Ngā Ngutuko ("The Pouted Lips"), the entrance to Oruamo or Hellyers Creek. A kāinga called Te Wharemoenanu ("The House of Sleep Talking") was located at the west of the suburb, at the entrance to Lucas Creek. Several other place names are known in the area, including Te Wharauakae ("The Shed of Kae"), the bay east of Greenhithe referring to a Te Kawerau ancestor who was killed here, Te Okoaratanga, the headland to the east of Greenhithe, and Ana Kororā, a site where kororā (little penguins) were captured in autumn. The band of the Upper Waitematā Harbour between Greenhithe and Herald Island was known as Wainoni.

Tauhinu pā, alongside other settlements of the North Shore, was attacked by Kapetaua (also known as Kapetawa) of the Hauraki Gulf around the year 1700, in retribution for Kapetaua being left stranded on Bean Rock. During the conflict between Ngāti Whātua and Kiwi Tāmaki of Waiohua, who was the paramount chief of the Auckland isthmus (circa 1740), the people of Tauhinu pā fought with Ngāti Whātua. Pahauroa, chief of Tauhinu, was wounded and died at Judges Bay during the conflict.

By the first half of the 19th century, the Greenhithe area was one of the most densely settled areas of the North Shore by Tāmaki Māori peoples. During the early 1820s, most Māori of the North Shore fled for the Waikato or Northland due to the threat of war parties during the Musket Wars. Ngāti Whātua left an ahi kā presence at Tauhinu pā, which included a small number of warriors. When people returned in greater numbers to the Auckland Region in the mid-1830s, Ngāti Whātua focused resettlement in the Māngere-Onehunga area, while Te Kawerau ā Maki focused settlement at Te Henga / Bethells Beach.

=== European settlement ===
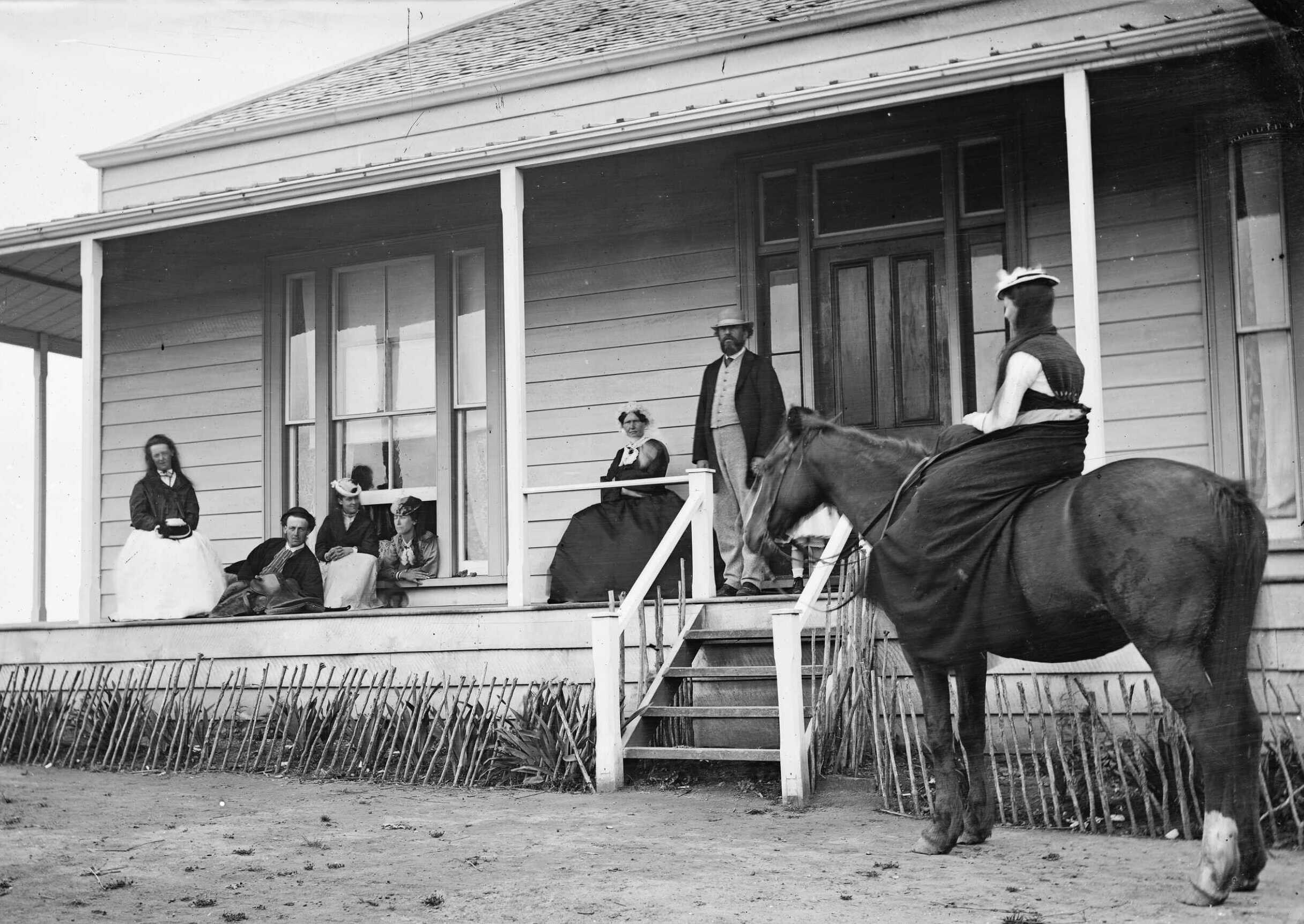
The Forgham family at Fern Bank in 1870

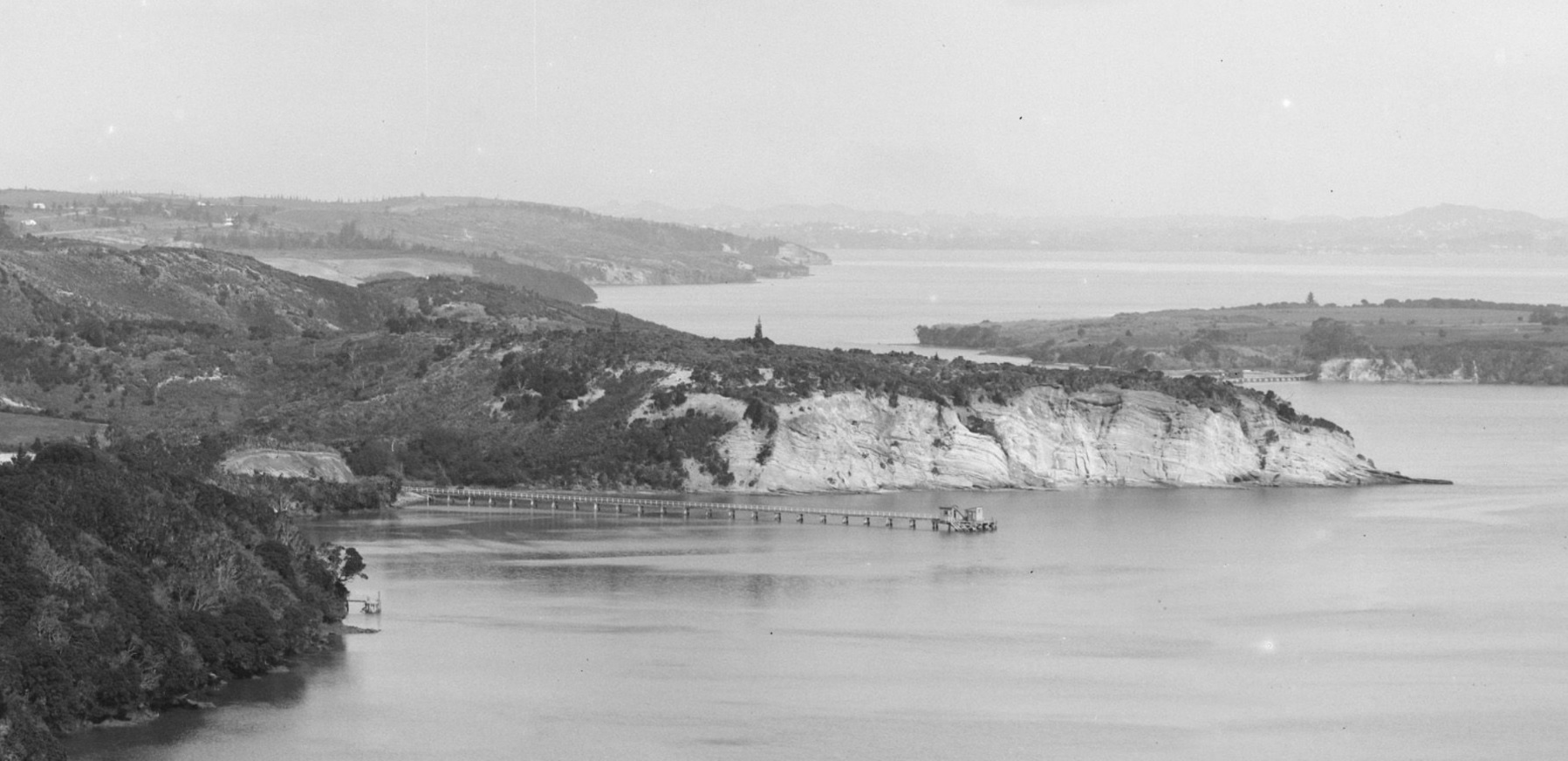
Greenhithe wharf and cliffs in 1912

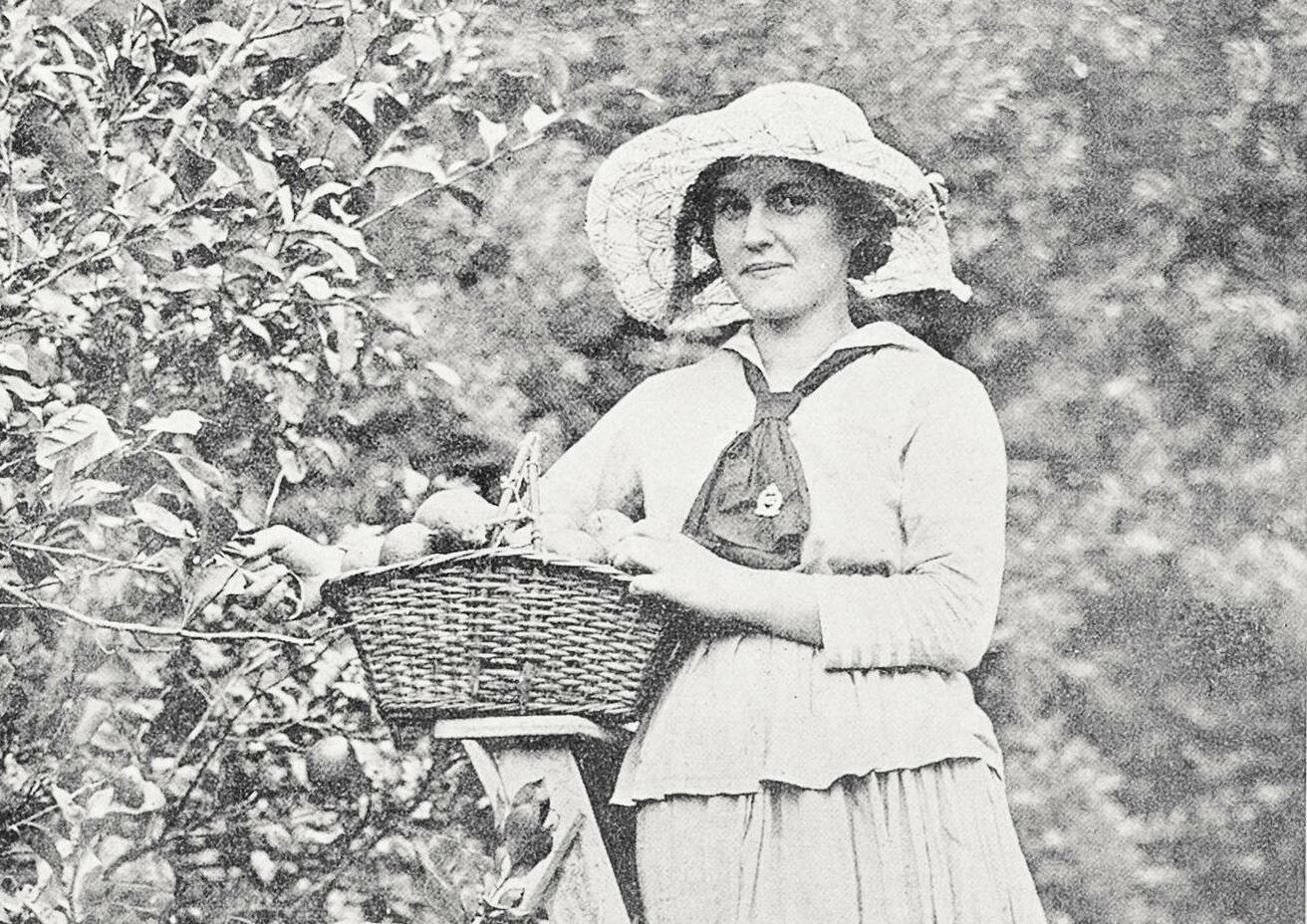
Lemon gathering at Greenhithe in 1921

The Greenhithe area was a part of the Mahurangi Block, which was purchased by the New Zealand Government in the early 1840s. Kauri gum digging was a major income source for European settlers in the late 1840s. The first Crown land grants to European settlers in Greenhithe were to the Gamble Brothers, shoemakers from Auckland who purchased property in 1854 and 1855. The first known permanent resident was George Deane, who purchased 69 acres of land adjacent to Lucas Creek in 1858 and settled here with his wife. After struggling to make a living in the area, Deane and his wife left for Britain in 1861. During this period, the western Greenhithe headland gained the name Humbug Point by shippers who worked along the Upper Waitematā Harbour area, due to the extensive sand banks that required ships to take wide detours.

In the mid-1860s, Thomas and Mary Forgham arrived in Auckland from Birmingham, establishing a self-sustaining community in Greenhithe. Calling their farmhouse Fern Bank (later Grey Oaks), the Forghams planted fruit trees and farmed livestock. The name Greenhithe became popularised in the 1880s, after Henry James Blyth, renamed the farmstead this after he took ownership of the farm in the 1880s. Fruit boxes headed to the Auckland markets from the farm had the name Greenhithe prominently written on them. By the late 1880s, orchards growing apples, lemons and pears had become the major industry of the area.

Greenhithe began developing as a rural community in the 1910s and 1920s. Thomas Hunter established the first reliable passenger and shipping service to Auckland in 1908, the Greenhithe Hall was constructed in 1914, and the first store was opened in 1917. By the 1920s, the Greenhithe Hall had become the centre of social life for the area, and the Jonkers family fruit canning factory was opened. In 1926 the population was 134, which had grown to 471 by 1951. In the 1920s, Winstone Ltd dredged the sandy Upper Waitematā Harbour, which led to instability in the Greenhithe cliffs, causing them to collapse from 30.5 metres (100 ft) to 18.5 metres (61 ft).

=== Suburban development ===
Greenhithe became much more closely connected to Auckland when the Auckland Harbour Bridge opened in 1959, and the Greenhithe ferry service closed in 1960. In 1958, a boatyard opened on Rame Road, leading boat repair to become one of the largest enterprises in Greenhithe. Ferro Cement Ltd began producing concrete hulled boats in Greenhithe in the mid-1960s. As Albany and other areas of the North Shore became more popular locations for businesses in the latter 20th century, most industrial sites left Greenhithe.

Greenhithe saw a second growth burst in the 1970s, after the Upper Harbour Bridge was constructed in 1975. In 1971 the population had reached 1,076, and by 1981 this had grown to 1,578. Greenhithe was a targeted area for population growth by the North Shore City Council in 2002. The population of the suburb grew significantly after these changes, from 4,170 in 2001 to 7,613 in 2013.

In 2007, the Upper Harbour Motorway was opened, creating a motorway connection between West Auckland and the North Shore via Greenhithe.

== Local government ==
From 1876 until 1954, the area was administered by the Waitemata County, a large rural county north and west of the city of Auckland. The Greenhithe Road District was established in 1886, but dissolved in 1888.

On 1 August 1974, the Waitemata County was dissolved, and Greenhithe became a rural area incorporated into Takapuna City. In 1989, Greenhithe was merged into the North Shore City. North Shore City was amalgamated into Auckland Council in November 2010.

Within the Auckland Council, Greenhithe is a part of the Upper Harbour local government area governed by the Upper Harbour Local Board. It is a part of the Albany ward, which elects two councillors to the Auckland Council.

== Demographics ==
Greenhithe covers 7.81 km^{2} (3.02 sq mi) and had an estimated population of 9,350 as of June 2025, with a population density of 1,197 people per km^{2}.

Historical population
Year	Pop.	±% p.a.
2006	5,901	—
2013	7,686	+3.85%
2018	8,592	+2.25%
2023	8,907	+0.72%

Greenhithe had a population of 8,907 in the 2023 New Zealand census, an increase of 315 people (3.7%) since the 2018 census, and an increase of 1,221 people (15.9%) since the 2013 census. There were 4,431 males, 4,446 females and 30 people of other genders in 2,718 dwellings. 2.9% of people identified as LGBTIQ+. The median age was 38.6 years (compared with 38.1 years nationally). There were 1,704 people (19.1%) aged under 15 years, 1,728 (19.4%) aged 15 to 29, 4,476 (50.3%) aged 30 to 64, and 999 (11.2%) aged 65 or older.

People could identify as more than one ethnicity. The results were 63.6% European (Pākehā); 5.8% Māori; 2.1% Pasifika; 33.5% Asian; 2.5% Middle Eastern, Latin American and African New Zealanders (MELAA); and 2.0% other, which includes people giving their ethnicity as "New Zealander". English was spoken by 93.1%, Māori language by 0.9%, Samoan by 0.2%, and other languages by 31.2%. No language could be spoken by 1.7% (e.g. too young to talk). New Zealand Sign Language was known by 0.2%. The percentage of people born overseas was 44.6, compared with 28.8% nationally.

Religious affiliations were 25.7% Christian, 1.9% Hindu, 1.3% Islam, 0.2% Māori religious beliefs, 1.3% Buddhist, 0.3% New Age, 0.3% Jewish, and 1.1% other religions. People who answered that they had no religion were 62.6%, and 5.6% of people did not answer the census question.

Of those at least 15 years old, 2,175 (30.2%) people had a bachelor's or higher degree, 3,072 (42.6%) had a post-high school certificate or diploma, and 1,359 (18.9%) people exclusively held high school qualifications. The median income was $53,500, compared with $41,500 nationally. 1,638 people (22.7%) earned over $100,000 compared to 12.1% nationally. The employment status of those at least 15 was that 4,047 (56.2%) people were employed full-time, 1,107 (15.4%) were part-time, and 138 (1.9%) were unemployed.

Individual statistical areas
Name	Area (km^{2})	Population	Density (per km^{2})	Dwellings	Median age	Median income
Greenhithe West	2.72	3,567	1,311	1,128	41.8 years	$53,800
Greenhithe East	1.44	3,219	2,235	945	36.5 years	$52,300
Greenhithe South	3.64	2,124	584	648	37.5 years	$54,900
New Zealand					38.1 years	$41,500

== Amenities ==
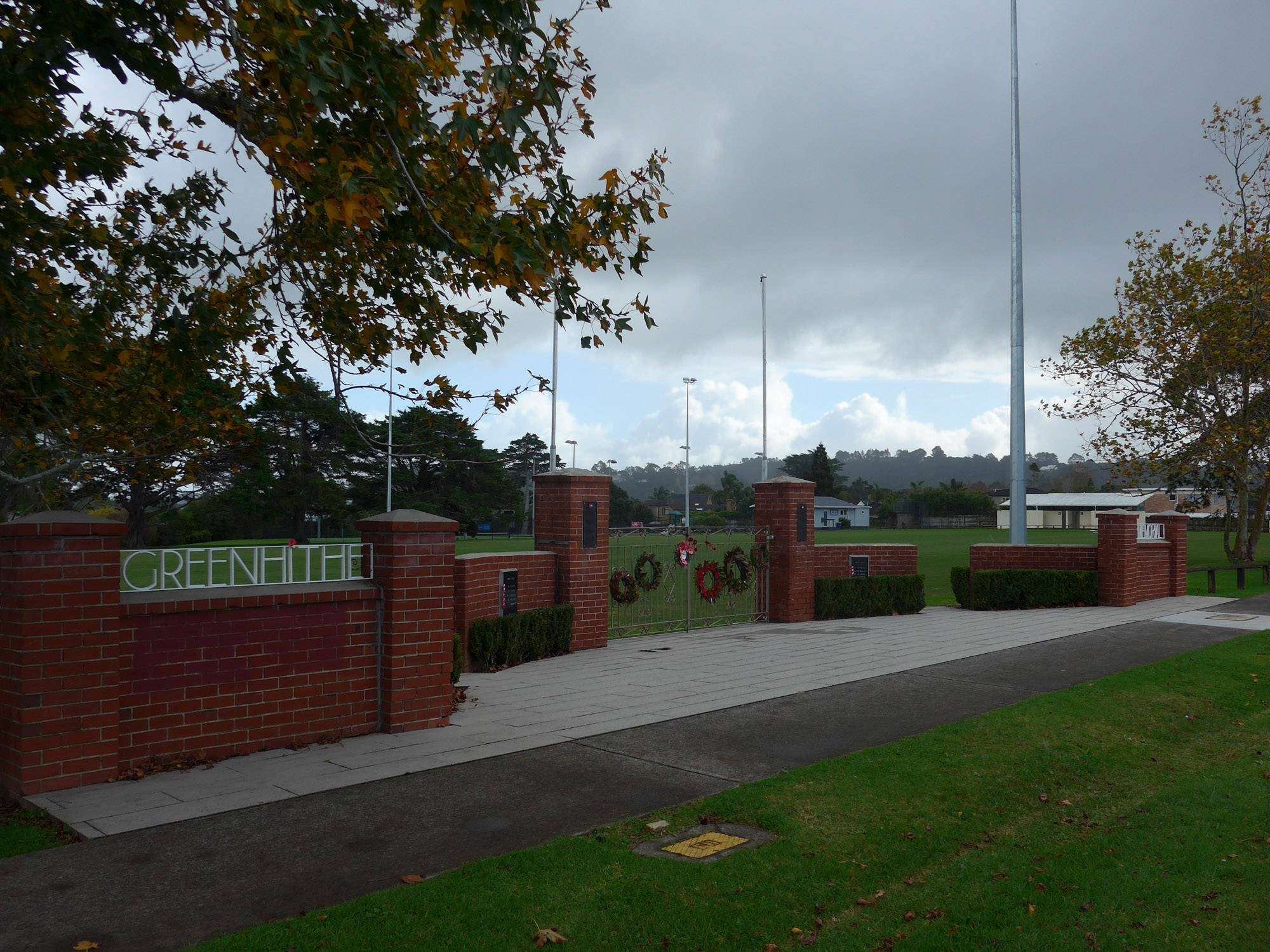
The gates of the Greenhithe War Memorial Park

- Greenhithe Community Hall, a community centre first established in 1914.
- Greenhithe village, the main commercial centre of the suburb on Greenhithe Road.
- Greenhithe War Memorial Park, a park established as a World War II memorial.
- North Shore Rowing Club, which operates from Rame Road in Greenhithe.
- St Michael and All Angels is an Anglican church in Greenhithe that was constructed in 1956.
- Wainoni Park is a 40 hectares (99 acres) suburban park located in Greenhithe. It is the home of Greenhithe FC, the Greenhithe Pony Club and Greenhithe Riding for the Disabled.

== Education ==
Greenhithe School is a coeducational contributing primary (years 1–6) school with a roll of 462 students as at July 2026. The school opened as a small rural school in 1893.

Upper Harbour Primary School is a coeducational contributing primary school (years 1–6), with a roll of 360 students as at July 2026. The school opened in February 2006.

== Notable people ==
- Julie Chapman, founder of the charity KidsCan
- Olivia McTaggart, pole vault athlete
- Martin Monstedt was a Norwegian blacksmith and coachbuilder who arrived in Albany in 1877 with his wife. He moved to Greenhithe and built a cottage in 1880. This original cottage burnt down and was replaced by a villa in 1887. Monstedt was involved in local politics and had his poetry frequently published in the local newspapers. Monstedt died in August 1923. The Monstedt House was listed as a category A place in the North Shore City heritage plan and as a category B place in the Auckland Unitary Plan, despite this the villa was demolished in 2022.

== Bibliography ==
- Dunmore, John (2001). Greenhithe: Today & Yesterday. Auckland: Heritage Press Ltd. ISBN 0-908708-53-X. OCLC 80291058. Wikidata Q123416573.
- King, Ray (1984), Tauhinu: a History of Greenhithe, OCLC 37242212, Wikidata Q123416976
- Taua, Te Warena (2009). "He Kohikohinga Kōrero mō Hikurangi". In Macdonald, Finlay; Kerr, Ruth (eds.). West: The History of Waitakere. Random House. pp. 23–48. ISBN 9781869790080.
- Verran, David (2010), The North Shore: An Illustrated History, North Shore: Random House, OL 33434370W, Wikidata Q120520385
