= Greenhithe FC =

- Full name: Greenhithe Football Club
- Founded: 2012
- Ground: Wainoni Park, Churchouse Rd, Greenhithe, North Shore, New Zealand
- Chairman: Kerrin Thomson
- Manager: Sergio Alva
- League: NRF Division 7 Harbour
- 2026: NRF Division 7 Harbour, 2nd of 10
Home colours	Away colours

Greenhithe Football Club, commonly referred to as Greenhithe Catimba (“gamesmanship” in Portuguese), is an amateur association football club based in the suburb of Greenhithe, Auckland, New Zealand. They are part of the Northern Football Federation, currently competing in the NRF Division 7 Harbour. They also compete in the New Zealand Chatham Cup.

Greenhithe strongly represents the Latin American community in Auckland, forming a relationship with Latin American social side Catimba in 2018; as a result, Greenhithe had more Argentine players than any other club outside Argentina in 2018.

== History ==
Originally founded in 1983 as a junior club, in 2016 the club changed its name from Greenhithe Junior Football Club to Greenhithe Football Club to prepare to expand the club and start including senior teams including social and women's football. In their first year offering senior football, the club had six teams competing with five men and one women's team for the 2018 season as part of Northern Football Federation.

== Honours ==
- AFF/NFF Conference Champions: 2018
- NFF Reserves Cup Champions: 2018
