= Sunnynook, New Zealand =

Sunnynook
- Suburb
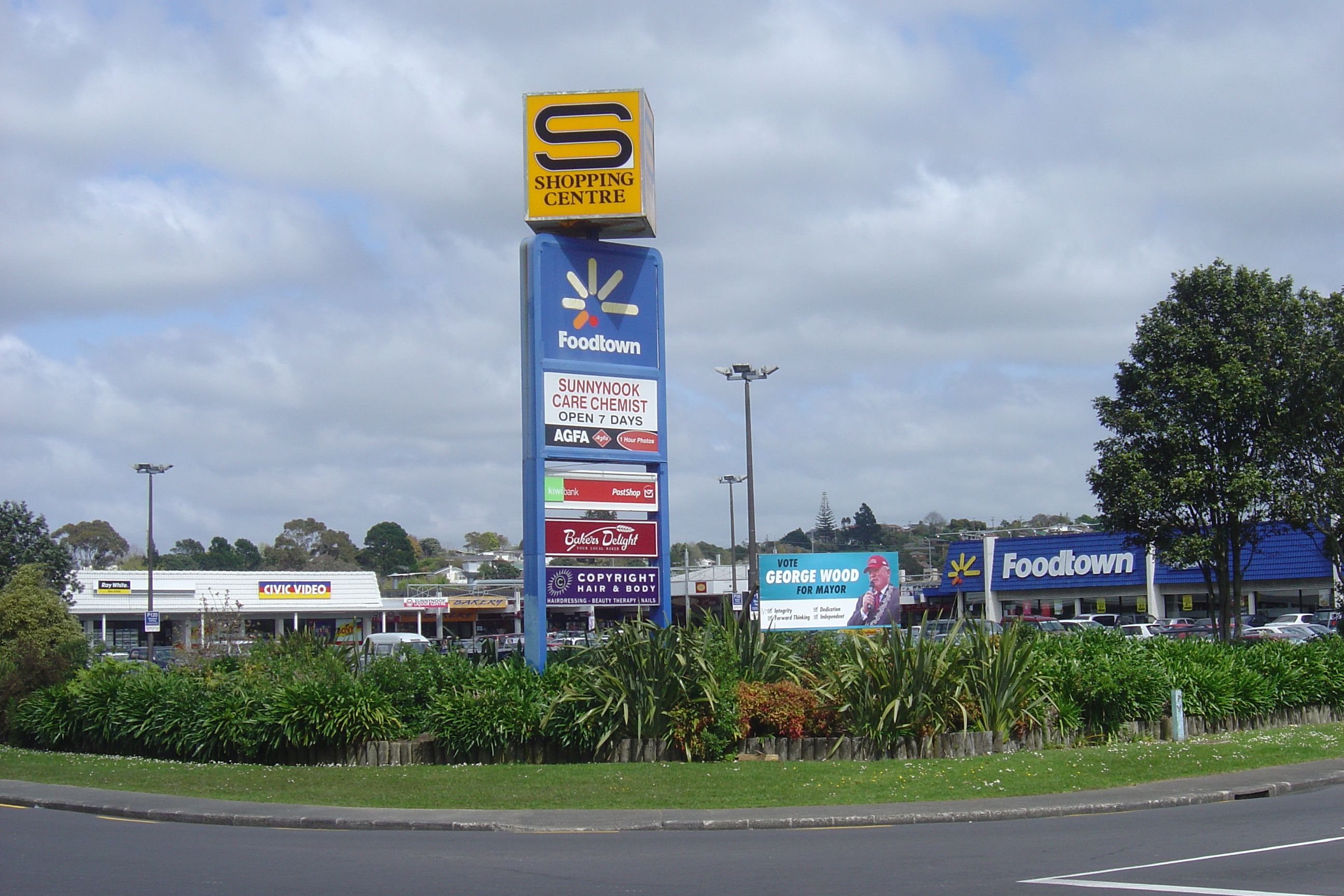
- Sunnynook Shopping Centre
- Interactive map of Sunnynook
- Coordinates: 36.755°S 174.737°E
- Country: New Zealand
- City: Auckland
- Local authority: Auckland Council
- Electoral ward: North Shore ward
- Local board: Devonport-Takapuna Local Board

Area
  - Land: 155 ha (380 acres)

Population (June 2025)
  - Total: 6,110
  - Density: 3,940/km^{2} (10,200/sq mi)
- Postcode: 0620
- Busway stations: Sunnynook busway station

Rosedale	Mairangi Bay	Campbells Bay
Totara Vale	Sunnynook	Castor Bay
Glenfield	Wairau Valley	Forrest Hill

Sunnynook is a suburb on the North Shore in the Auckland metropolitan area in New Zealand. It is currently under the governance of Auckland Council.

The suburb is centred on the Sunnynook Shopping Centre and the nearby Sunnynook Park. A skateboard bowl is located in the park, which is also home to the Glenfield Greyhounds rugby league club. Sunnynook residents have access to the Northern Busway rapid transit bus link via the Sunnynook busway station.

== Demographics ==
Sunnynook covers 1.55 km^{2} (0.60 sq mi) and had an estimated population of 6,110 as of June 2025, with a population density of 3,968 people per km^{2}.

Historical population
Year	Pop.	±% p.a.
2006	5,034	—
2013	5,124	+0.25%
2018	5,538	+1.57%
2023	5,532	−0.02%

Sunnynook had a population of 5,532 in the 2023 New Zealand census, a decrease of 6 people (−0.1%) since the 2018 census, and an increase of 408 people (8.0%) since the 2013 census. There were 2,793 males, 2,724 females and 15 people of other genders in 1,794 dwellings. 3.6% of people identified as LGBTIQ+. The median age was 35.0 years (compared with 38.1 years nationally). There were 1,065 people (19.3%) aged under 15 years, 1,191 (21.5%) aged 15 to 29, 2,793 (50.5%) aged 30 to 64, and 483 (8.7%) aged 65 or older.

People could identify as more than one ethnicity. The results were 40.3% European (Pākehā); 6.9% Māori; 4.1% Pasifika; 52.7% Asian; 3.5% Middle Eastern, Latin American and African New Zealanders (MELAA); and 2.2% other, which includes people giving their ethnicity as "New Zealander". English was spoken by 89.3%, Māori language by 1.3%, Samoan by 0.6%, and other languages by 45.7%. No language could be spoken by 2.2% (e.g. too young to talk). New Zealand Sign Language was known by 0.2%. The percentage of people born overseas was 58.9, compared with 28.8% nationally.

Religious affiliations were 33.5% Christian, 3.1% Hindu, 3.4% Islam, 0.3% Māori religious beliefs, 3.3% Buddhist, 0.3% New Age, 0.1% Jewish, and 0.8% other religions. People who answered that they had no religion were 49.7%, and 5.5% of people did not answer the census question.

Of those at least 15 years old, 1,725 (38.6%) people had a bachelor's or higher degree, 1,683 (37.7%) had a post-high school certificate or diploma, and 1,053 (23.6%) people exclusively held high school qualifications. The median income was $46,300, compared with $41,500 nationally. 597 people (13.4%) earned over $100,000 compared to 12.1% nationally. The employment status of those at least 15 was that 2,532 (56.7%) people were employed full-time, 630 (14.1%) were part-time, and 159 (3.6%) were unemployed.

Individual statistical areas
Name	Area (km^{2})	Population	Density (per km^{2})	Dwellings	Median age	Median income
Sunnynook North	0.74	2,901	3,920	939	34.8 years	$48,800
Sunnynook South	0.80	2,631	3,289	855	35.3 years	$43,500
New Zealand					38.1 years	$41,500

== Education ==
- Wairau Intermediate is an intermediate (years 7–8) school with a roll of 340 students as of July 2025. It opened in 1980.
- Sunnynook Primary School is a contributing primary (years 1–6) school with a roll of 500 students as of July 2025. It opened in 1968. Both schools are coeducational.

== Gallery ==
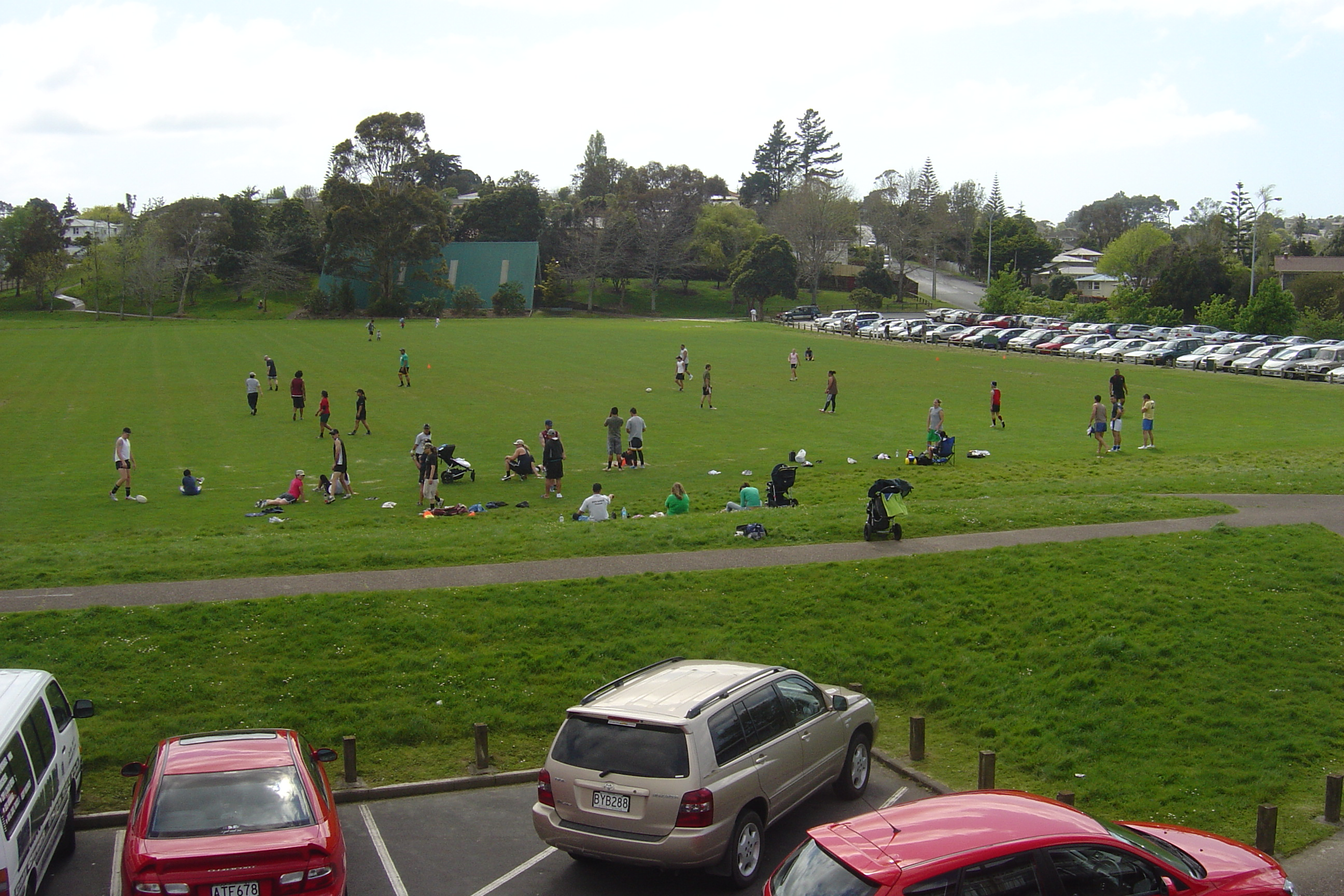
Playing sports on Sunnynook Park

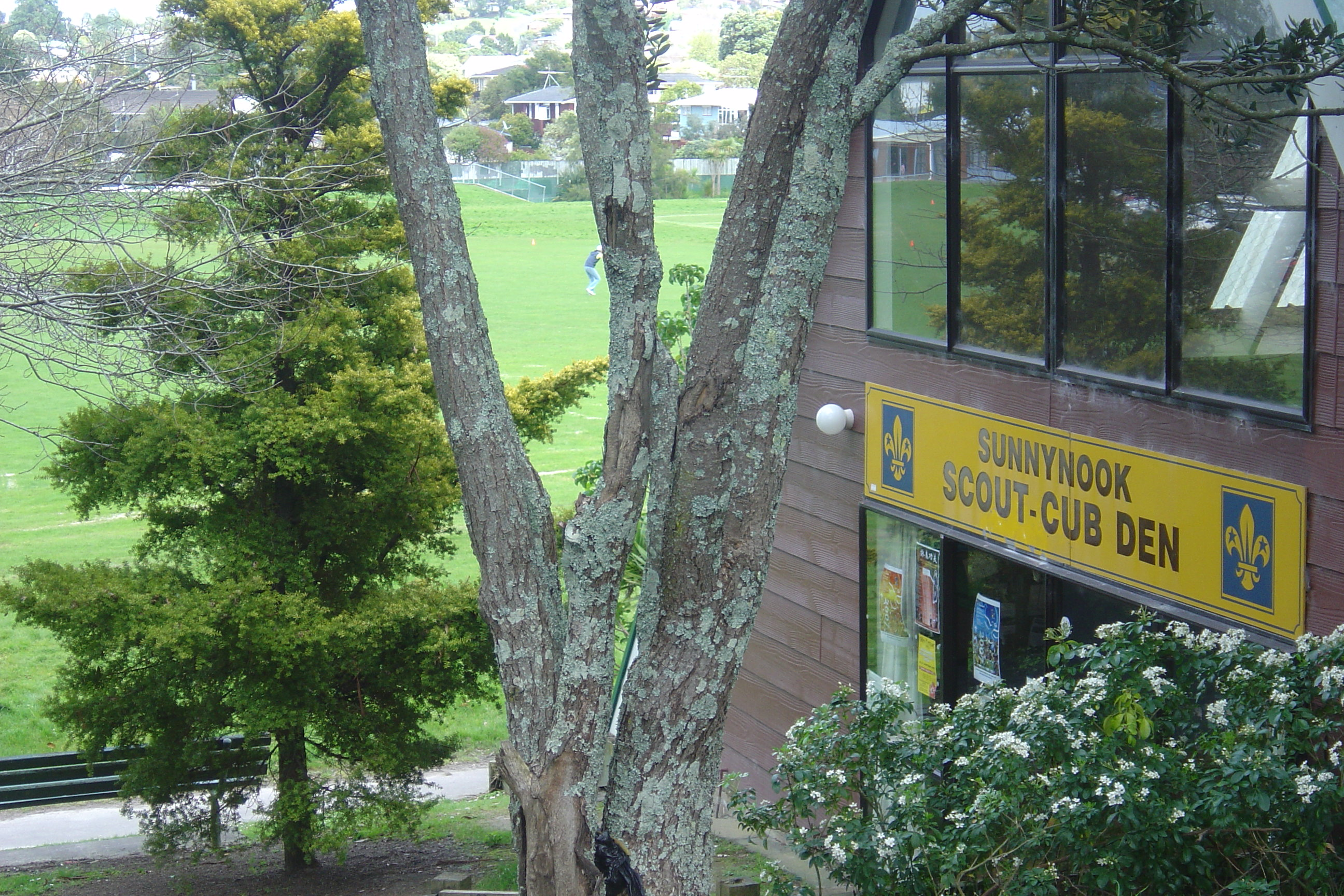
Sunnynook Scout Den on the edge of Sunnynook Park

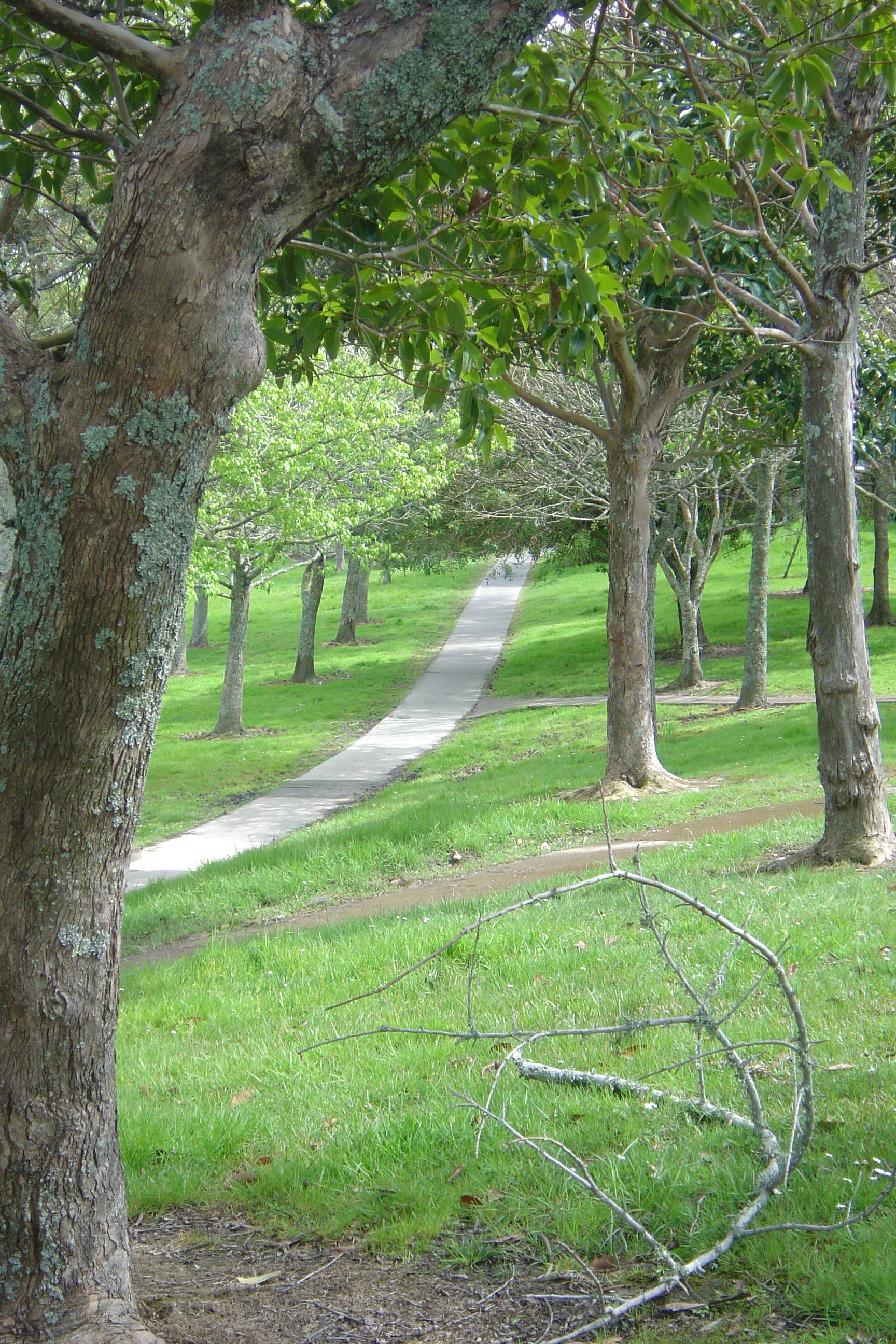
Sunnynook Park on a warm Spring morning
