= North Shore City Council v Auckland Regional Council =

North Shore City Council v Auckland Regional Council'
- Court: Environment Court of New Zealand
- Full case name: North Shore City Council v Auckland Regional Council
- Decided: 1 October 1996
- Citation: [1997] NZRMA 59
- Transcript: Judgment

Case history
- Prior action: [1995] NZRMA 424 (PT)
- Subsequent action: [1995] 3 NZLR 18 (CA)

Court membership
- Judges sitting: Sheppard J, P A Catchpole and I G C Kerr

Keywords
- Resource Management, Regional Policy Statement, Metropolitan Urban Limit

North Shore City Council v Auckland Regional Council was a case in the Environment Court of New Zealand concerning the proper interpretation of section five of the Resource Management Act 1991 by planning bodies.

== Background ==
The Auckland Regional Council had publicly notified its proposed regional policy statement in early 1994 which would have restricted urban development with a line of metropolitan urban limits.

The appellants, the North Shore City Council and the owners of land in the area around Long Bay and Okura River sought to modify the metropolitan urban limits so that an area of some 700 hectares in the area would be zoned within the urban limit

== Judgment ==
The Environment Court allowed the appeals in part, "to the extent that the regional council is directed to alter the line of metropolitan urban limits in the proposed regional policy statement so that instead of following Glenvar Road, the line follows the watershed or catchment boundary between the Long Bay and Okura catchments."

In coming to this determination the Court had decided that,

"We have concluded that urbanisation of the part of the subject land in the Okura catchment would necessarily have significant adverse effects on the environment of the Okura Estuary, and that the estuary, its high quality waters and ecosystem, possesses life supporting capacity which deserve to be safeguarded. However we have not accepted that there would necessarily be significant adverse effects of urbanisation on the environment of the Long Bay coast, or on the marine life of the marine reserves."

In coming to its decision the Court had regard to section 5 of the Resource Management Act which states the Act's purpose as promoting sustainable management. The Court held:

"The method of applying s 5 then involves an overall broad judgment of whether a proposal would promote the sustainable management of natural and physical resources. That recognises that the [RMA] has a single purpose. Such a judgment allows for comparison of conflicting considerations and the scale or degree of them, and their relative significance or proportion in the final outcome."

== Significance ==
The case established the "overall broad judgment" approach to interpretation of section 5 of the Resource Management Act.

In the 2014 decision, Environmental Defence Society v New Zealand King Salmon the Supreme Court declined to follow the "overall broad judgment" approach.
