= Tōtara Vale =

- Suburb
- Map
- Coordinates: 36.763°S 174.732°E
- Country: New Zealand
- City: Auckland
- Local authority: Auckland Council
- Electoral ward: North Shore ward
- Local board: Kaipātiki Local Board

Area
  - Land: 169 ha (420 acres)

Population (June 2025)
  - Total: 7,050
  - Density: 4,170/km^{2} (10,800/sq mi)
- Postcode: 0629

Unsworth Heights	Windsor Park	Sunnynook
Bayview	Tōtara Vale	Forrest Hill
Bayview	Glenfield	Wairau Valley

Tōtara Vale is a suburb located on the North Shore of Auckland, New Zealand. It is under the local governance of Auckland Council.

The suburb contains Rewi Alley Reserve, which has a memorial to Rewi Alley, a New Zealander who lived most of his life in China.

== Demographics ==
Tōtara Vale covers 1.69 km^{2} (0.65 sq mi) and had an estimated population of 7,050 as of June 2025, with a population density of 4,172 people per km^{2}.

Historical population
Year	Pop.	±% p.a.
2006	6,303	—
2013	6,204	−0.23%
2018	6,726	+1.63%
2023	6,438	−0.87%
The 2006 population is for a larger area of 1.77 km^{2}. Source:

Totara Vale had a population of 6,438 in the 2023 New Zealand census, a decrease of 288 people (−4.3%) since the 2018 census, and an increase of 234 people (3.8%) since the 2013 census. There were 3,240 males, 3,162 females and 33 people of other genders in 2,136 dwellings. 3.9% of people identified as LGBTIQ+. The median age was 34.7 years (compared with 38.1 years nationally). There were 1,152 people (17.9%) aged under 15 years, 1,407 (21.9%) aged 15 to 29, 3,228 (50.1%) aged 30 to 64, and 648 (10.1%) aged 65 or older.

People could identify as more than one ethnicity. The results were 38.5% European (Pākehā); 8.2% Māori; 6.4% Pasifika; 51.5% Asian; 4.4% Middle Eastern, Latin American and African New Zealanders (MELAA); and 2.5% other, which includes people giving their ethnicity as "New Zealander". English was spoken by 89.2%, Māori language by 1.5%, Samoan by 0.8%, and other languages by 43.5%. No language could be spoken by 2.6% (e.g. too young to talk). New Zealand Sign Language was known by 0.3%. The percentage of people born overseas was 56.9, compared with 28.8% nationally.

Religious affiliations were 36.8% Christian, 5.0% Hindu, 2.6% Islam, 0.6% Māori religious beliefs, 2.4% Buddhist, 0.3% New Age, and 1.6% other religions. People who answered that they had no religion were 45.2%, and 5.6% of people did not answer the census question.

Of those at least 15 years old, 1,767 (33.4%) people had a bachelor's or higher degree, 2,049 (38.8%) had a post-high school certificate or diploma, and 1,464 (27.7%) people exclusively held high school qualifications. The median income was $46,400, compared with $41,500 nationally. 519 people (9.8%) earned over $100,000 compared to 12.1% nationally. The employment status of those at least 15 was that 3,081 (58.3%) people were employed full-time, 609 (11.5%) were part-time, and 156 (3.0%) were unemployed.

Individual statistical areas
Name	Area (km^{2})	Population	Density (per km^{2})	Dwellings	Median age	Median income
Totara Vale North	0.87	2,964	3,407	975	35.4 years	$47,800
Totara Vale South	0.82	3,471	4,233	1,161	34.2 years	$45,400
New Zealand					38.1 years	$41,500

== Education ==
Target Road School is a coeducational contributing primary school (years 1–6), with a roll of 419 students as of July 2025. The school opened in 1967.
