= Blue Waters Hotel =

Antiguan hotel

Coordinates: 17°10′13″N 61°50′07″W

- Industry: Hotels, leisure and travel
- Founder: Osmond Kelsick
- Headquarters: Soldiers Bay, Antigua and Barbuda
- Key people: Anderson Howard, General Manager
- Website: www.bluewaters.net

Blue Waters Hotel, located in Soldiers Bay, Antigua, was first opened in 1960 as The Blue Waters Beach Hotel by Osmond Kelsick, a Royal Air Force airman noted as the only Antiguan squadron leader in World War II.

The hotel opened with just 16 rooms however by 1984 the property had grown to 45 rooms and was sold to British businessman Ronald Randall.

== Location ==
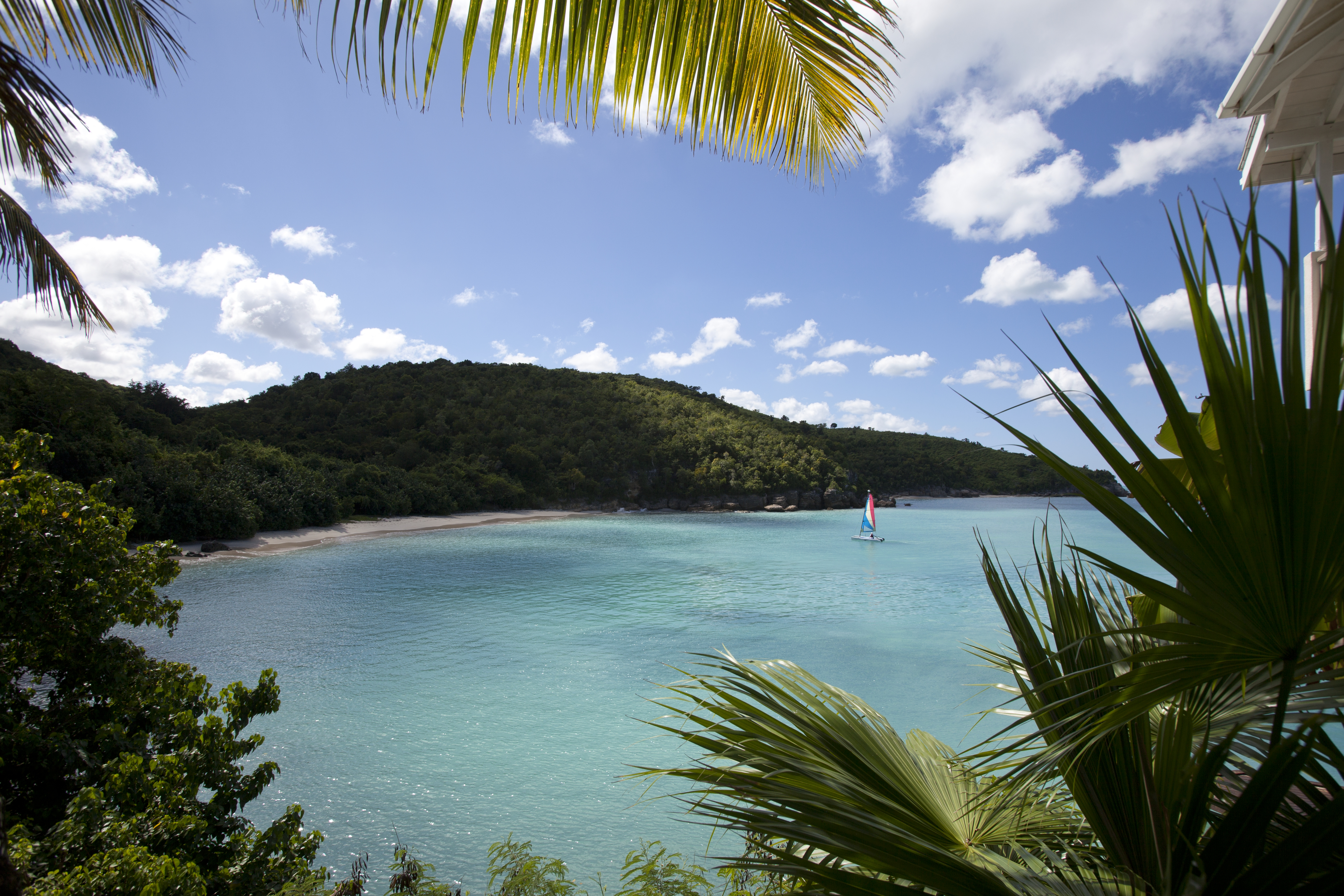
The view from the resort to Soldiers Bay, Antigua

Blue Waters is situated on three secluded beaches in Soldiers Bay, a small cove known for its calm waters. The hotel is approximately 7.5 km by road from the capital of St Johns and approximately 12 km from V. C. Bird International Airport.

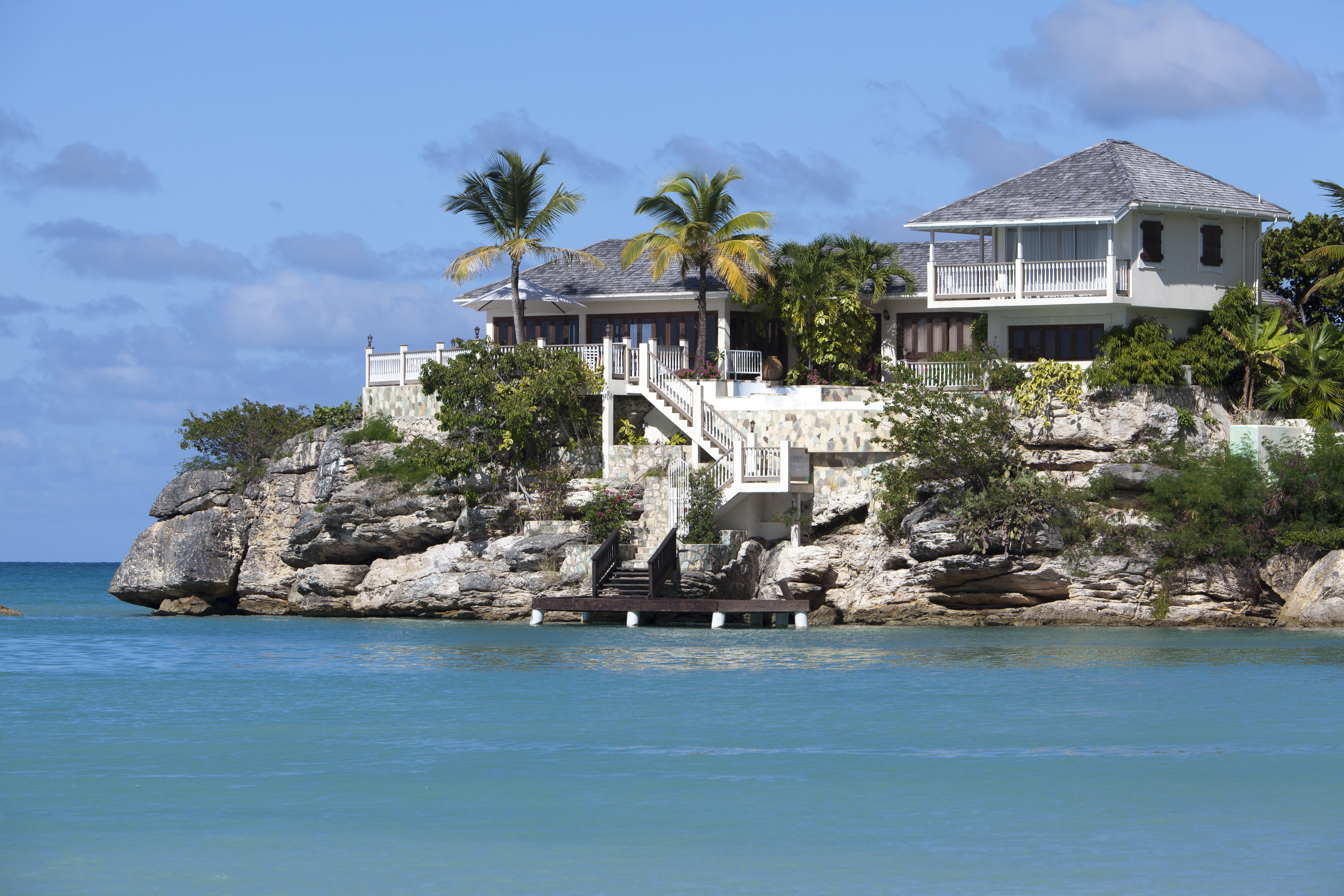
The view from Soldiers Bay, Antigua towards the resort

== Features ==
The resort features 3 restaurants, serving a mix of local and international cuisine. The property also holds a wedding licence, allowing ceremonies to take place within the grounds.

== Hurricane Luis ==
In 1995 the hotel was severely damaged by Hurricane Luis and was closed to undergo extensive refurbishment costing $9 million. The hotel re-opened in November 1998.

== Awards ==
Blue Waters has received the following awards:

Antigua and Barbuda's Leading Hotel: 2012, 2010, 2006

The Queen's Diamond Jubilee Award: 2012 The hotel was one of only 2 companies to be awarded this accolade which was given for Blue Waters' significant contribution to Antigua during its 50 years of business on the island.

Trip Advisor Certificate of Excellence: 2012

== Charity ==
Blue Waters works closely with Starlight, a charity aimed at improving the lives of seriously and terminally ill children by granting them once in a lifetime experiences. Blue Waters has sponsored the Starlight Highclere Clay Pigeon Shooting Challenge since it began in 2003.
