= Wairau Valley, Auckland =

Wairau Valley
- Suburb
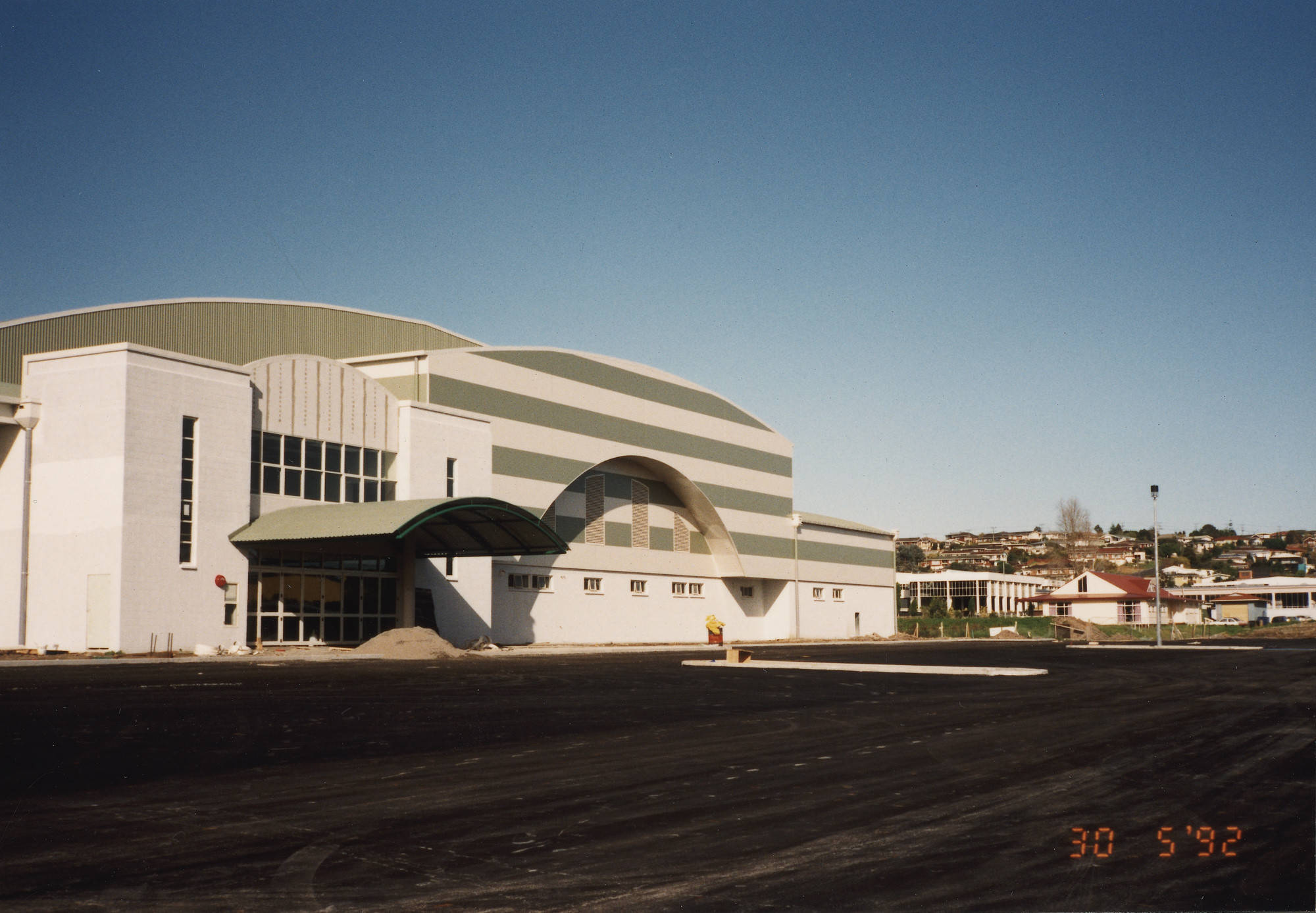
- Eventfinda Stadium
- Interactive map of Wairau Valley
- Coordinates: 36°46′29″S 174°44′17″E
- Country: New Zealand
- City: Auckland
- Local authority: Auckland Council
- Electoral ward: North Shore Ward
- Local board: Kaipātiki Local Board

Area
  - Land: 256 ha (630 acres)

Population (June 2025)
  - Total: 120
  - Density: 47/km^{2} (120/sq mi)
- Postcode(s): 7072, 7271, 7274, 7276

| Glenfield | Tōtara Vale | Forrest Hill |
| Glenfield | Wairau Valley | Forrest Hill |
| Glenfield | Hillcrest | Takapuna |

Wairau Valley is a suburb of Auckland, New Zealand. The area is predominantly light industrial/commercial. The Northern Motorway passes to the east, and the Wairau Park shopping complex extends to the north. The valley is drained by the Wairau Creek, which flows on through Milford and discharges into the Hauraki Gulf from an estuary at the northern end of Milford Beach.

== Etymology ==
The suburb is named after the Wairau Creek, which flows through it. The name Wairau in Māori means "Waters Gathered by a Net".

== History ==
The Wairau Valley was primarily swampland and farmland in the early 20th century, including some areas that were leased to Chinese market gardeners. In 1959, the Auckland Harbour Bridge opened, leading to rapid suburbanisation on the North Shore. The Wairau Valley developed stormwater runoff problems as the surrounding greenspaces were developed, and the Waitemata County Council began plans to line the Wairau Valley waterways with concrete.

From 1970, Wairau Valley was redeveloped as an industrial area, and only a few years later became the largest industrial area on the North Shore.

In 1982, The Warehouse opened their first store in New Zealand in Wairau Valley. In 1992, the North Shore Sports and Leisure Centre was opened in the suburb (now known as the Eventfinda Stadium).

== Demographics ==
Wairau Valley covers 2.56 km^{2} (0.99 sq mi) and had an estimated population of 120 as of June 2025, with a population density of 47 people per km^{2}.

Historical population
| Year | Pop. | ±% p.a. |
|---|---|---|
| 2006 | 105 | — |
| 2013 | 168 | +6.94% |
| 2018 | 204 | +3.96% |
| 2023 | 120 | −10.07% |

Wairau Valley had a population of 120 in the 2023 New Zealand census, a decrease of 84 people (−41.2%) since the 2018 census, and a decrease of 48 people (−28.6%) since the 2013 census. There were 63 males and 54 females in 45 dwellings. 2.5% of people identified as LGBTIQ+. The median age was 37.9 years (compared with 38.1 years nationally). There were 24 people (20.0%) aged under 15 years, 15 (12.5%) aged 15 to 29, 69 (57.5%) aged 30 to 64, and 15 (12.5%) aged 65 or older.

People could identify as more than one ethnicity. The results were 50.0% European (Pākehā); 12.5% Māori; 10.0% Pasifika; 40.0% Asian; and 2.5% Middle Eastern, Latin American and African New Zealanders (MELAA). English was spoken by 87.5%, Māori language by 2.5%, Samoan by 2.5%, and other languages by 42.5%. The percentage of people born overseas was 50.0, compared with 28.8% nationally.

Religious affiliations were 20.0% Christian, 7.5% Hindu, 2.5% Māori religious beliefs, 2.5% Buddhist, and 7.5% other religions. People who answered that they had no religion were 45.0%, and 12.5% of people did not answer the census question.

Of those at least 15 years old, 30 (31.2%) people had a bachelor's or higher degree, 45 (46.9%) had a post-high school certificate or diploma, and 27 (28.1%) people exclusively held high school qualifications. The median income was $36,600, compared with $41,500 nationally. 12 people (12.5%) earned over $100,000 compared to 12.1% nationally. The employment status of those at least 15 was that 57 (59.4%) people were employed full-time, 12 (12.5%) were part-time, and 3 (3.1%) were unemployed.

== Education and recreation ==
Wairau Valley Special School is a coeducational special school, with a roll of 270 students as of July 2025. It caters for students up to 21 years old with intellectual disabilities. The North Shore Events Centre, an indoor arena, is in Wairau Valley.

== Local government ==
The North Shore Highway District was the first local government body in the Wairau Valley from 1868, administering projects including roads from Birkenhead north to the Ōkura River. From 1876, the area was administered by the Waitemata County, a large rural county north and west of the city of Auckland.

On 1 August 1974, the Waitemata County was dissolved, and Wairau Valley was incorporated into Takapuna City. In 1989, Wairau Valley was merged into the North Shore City. North Shore City was amalgamated into Auckland Council in November 2010.

Within the Auckland Council, Wairau Valley is a part of the Kaipātiki local government area governed by the Kaipātiki Local Board. It is a part of the North Shore ward, which elects two councillors to the Auckland Council.

== Bibliography ==
- Rounthwaite, Valerie (1989), The Story of Rural Glenfield, Takapuna: Takapuna City Council, OCLC 37482407, Wikidata Q123499466
