= Rosedale Solar Array =

Power station in New Zealand

Rosedale Floating Solar Array
- Country: New Zealand
- Location: Rosedale, Auckland
- Coordinates: 36.7459°S 174.7163°E
- Status: Operational
- Commission date: 2020
- Owner: Watercare Services

The Rosedale Solar Array was the first and only floating solar array in New Zealand as of 2020, and for a period of time it was the biggest solar array in New Zealand.

== Statistics ==
The solar array produces 1486 kWh of electricity annually. It also has 2700 solar panels on it, and 4000 floating pontoons.

== Significance ==
- First floating solar array in New Zealand
- Once was the biggest solar array in New Zealand of any type
