= Pinehill, New Zealand =

Pinehill
- Suburb
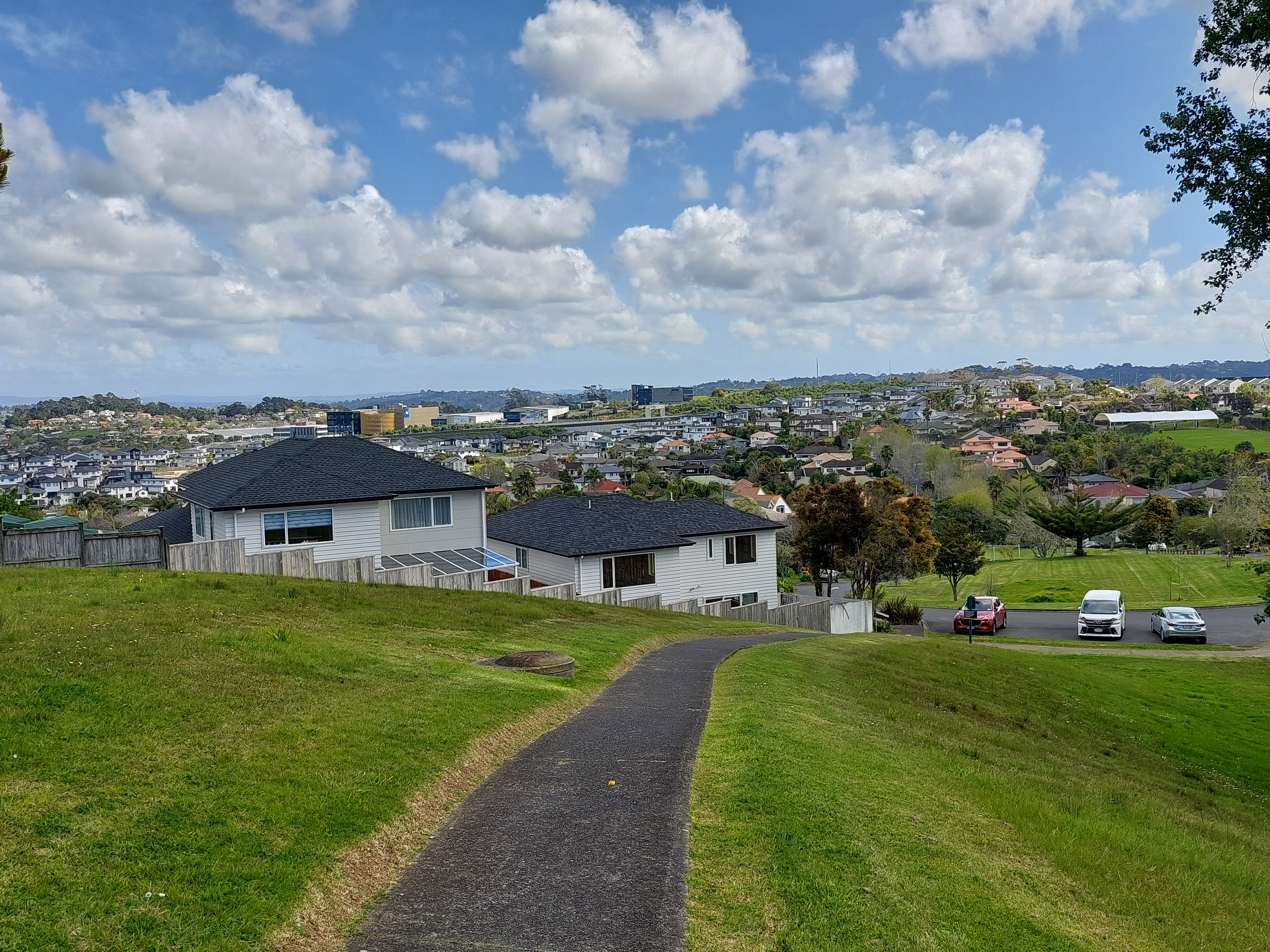
- View of Pinehill from Pinehill Reserve
- Interactive map of Pinehill
- Coordinates: 36.730903°S 174.723299°E
- Country: New Zealand
- City: Auckland
- Local authority: Auckland Council
- Electoral ward: Albany ward
- Local board: Upper Harbour Local Board

Area
  - Land: 163 ha (400 acres)

Population (June 2025)
  - Total: 5,260
  - Density: 3,230/km^{2} (8,360/sq mi)
- Postcode: 0632

Albany Heights	Oteha	Browns Bay
Albany	Pinehill	Rothesay Bay
Rosedale	Rosedale	Windsor Park

Pinehill is a small suburb in the East Coast Bays area of Auckland, New Zealand. The suburb has only recently grown because of the housing estates being built in the area for the rapidly growing Albany area. Pinehill is regularly serviced by buses which go to Takapuna and the Auckland city centre. The Auckland Northern Motorway passes to the west of the suburb.

== Demographics ==
Pinehill covers 1.63 km^{2} (0.63 sq mi) and had an estimated population of 5,260 as of June 2025, with a population density of 3,227 people per km^{2}.

Historical population
Year	Pop.	±% p.a.
2006	2,700	—
2013	3,954	+5.60%
2018	4,275	+1.57%
2023	4,821	+2.43%

Pinehill had a population of 4,821 in the 2023 New Zealand census, an increase of 546 people (12.8%) since the 2018 census, and an increase of 867 people (21.9%) since the 2013 census. There were 2,412 males, 2,403 females and 6 people of other genders in 1,284 dwellings. 3.9% of people identified as LGBTIQ+. The median age was 36.4 years (compared with 38.1 years nationally). There were 882 people (18.3%) aged under 15 years, 1,062 (22.0%) aged 15 to 29, 2,367 (49.1%) aged 30 to 64, and 510 (10.6%) aged 65 or older.

People could identify as more than one ethnicity. The results were 20.8% European (Pākehā); 2.9% Māori; 1.6% Pasifika; 76.6% Asian; 2.5% Middle Eastern, Latin American and African New Zealanders (MELAA); and 1.2% other, which includes people giving their ethnicity as "New Zealander". English was spoken by 81.8%, Māori language by 0.8%, Samoan by 0.2%, and other languages by 63.7%. No language could be spoken by 2.1% (e.g. too young to talk). New Zealand Sign Language was known by 0.5%. The percentage of people born overseas was 69.8, compared with 28.8% nationally.

Religious affiliations were 26.1% Christian, 2.3% Hindu, 1.6% Islam, 0.1% Māori religious beliefs, 3.3% Buddhist, 0.1% New Age, and 0.9% other religions. People who answered that they had no religion were 60.5%, and 5.0% of people did not answer the census question.

Of those at least 15 years old, 1,272 (32.3%) people had a bachelor's or higher degree, 1,266 (32.1%) had a post-high school certificate or diploma, and 1,164 (29.6%) people exclusively held high school qualifications. The median income was $39,200, compared with $41,500 nationally. 474 people (12.0%) earned over $100,000 compared to 12.1% nationally. The employment status of those at least 15 was that 1,992 (50.6%) people were employed full-time, 492 (12.5%) were part-time, and 108 (2.7%) were unemployed.

Individual statistical areas
Name	Area (km^{2})	Population	Density (per km^{2})	Dwellings	Median age	Median income
Pinehill North	0.70	2,313	3,304	636	36.0 years	$42,100
Pinehill South	0.93	2,511	2,700	654	36.9 years	$36,500
New Zealand					38.1 years	$41,500

== Education ==
Pinehill School is a coeducational contributing primary school (years 1–6) with a roll of 446 students as at July 2025. The school opened in 1997.
