= Forrest Hill, New Zealand =

Forrest Hill
- Suburb
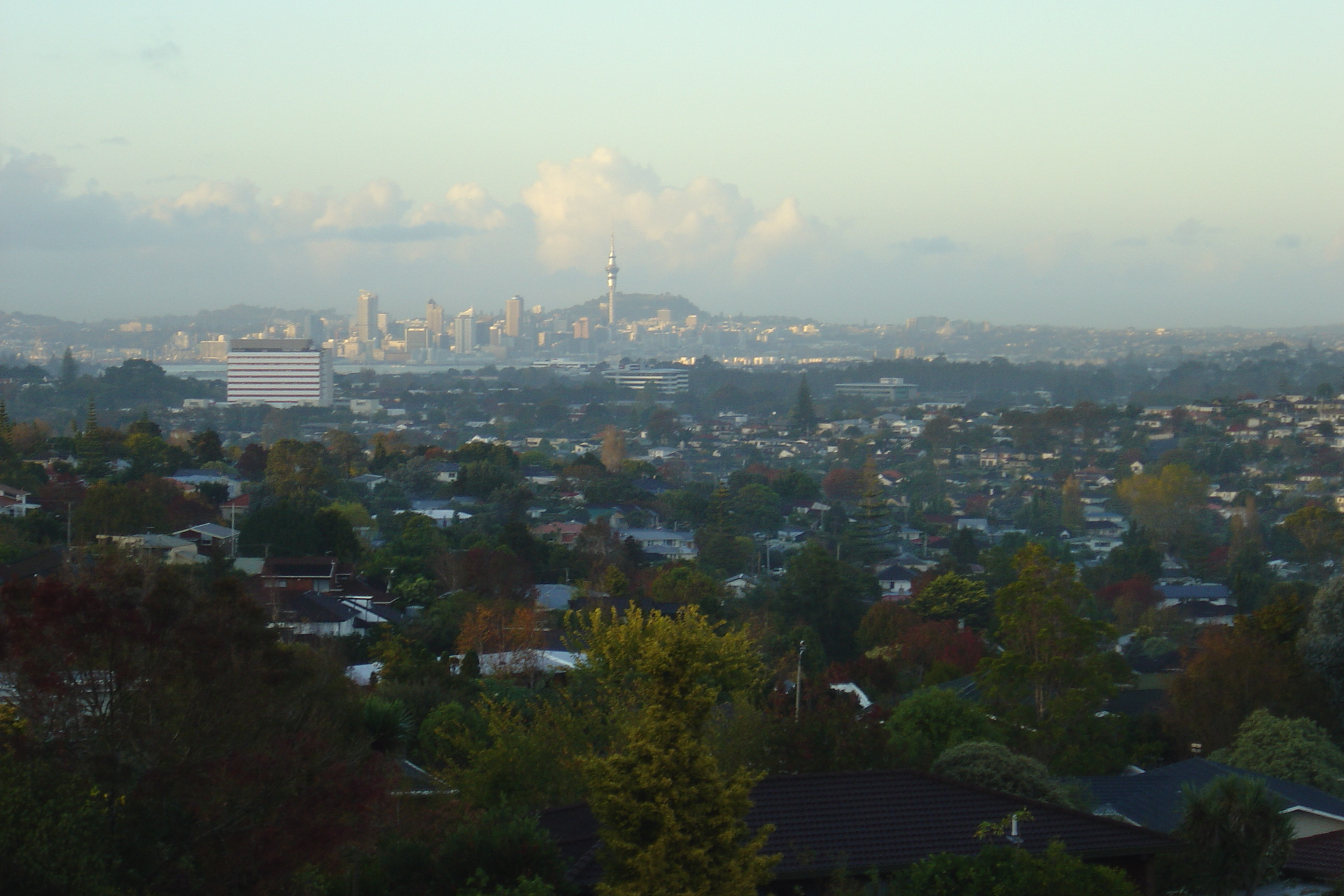
- View of the North Shore and Central Auckland from Forrest Hill
- Interactive map of Forrest Hill
- Coordinates: 36°46′02″S 174°44′53″E
- Country: New Zealand
- City: Auckland
- Local authority: Auckland Council
- Electoral ward: North Shore ward
- Local board: Devonport-Takapuna Local Board

Area
  - Land: 290 ha (720 acres)

Population (June 2025)
  - Total: 10,850
  - Density: 3,700/km^{2} (9,700/sq mi)
- Postcode: 0620

Sunnynook	Campbells Bay	Campbells Bay
Tōtara Vale	Forrest Hill	Castor Bay
Wairau Valley	Hillcrest	Milford

Forrest Hill is a suburb located on the North Shore of Auckland, New Zealand.

Forrest Hill is under the local governance of Auckland Council. It was previously governed by the North Shore City Council, which amalgamated into Auckland Council on 1 November 2010.

Forrest Hill Road and (ultimately) the whole suburb of Forrest Hill is named after Lt. Hugh Alexander Forrest, born in Wellington on 30 May 1893, who was killed in action on 12 October 1917, in the First Battle of Passchendaele during World War I. The Takapuna Borough Council renamed Whites Hill Road in his honour at a council meeting on 22 October 1919, and the entire area was named after the road about five decades later. Northern Forrest Hill is also known as Crown Hill.

== Demographics ==
Forrest Hill covers 2.90 km^{2} (1.12 sq mi) and had an estimated population of 10,850 as of June 2025, with a population density of 3,741 people per km^{2}.

Historical population
Year	Pop.	±% p.a.
2006	8,712	—
2013	9,474	+1.21%
2018	10,023	+1.13%
2023	10,053	+0.06%

Forrest Hill had a population of 10,053 in the 2023 New Zealand census, an increase of 30 people (0.3%) since the 2018 census, and an increase of 579 people (6.1%) since the 2013 census. There were 4,977 males, 5,040 females and 33 people of other genders in 3,162 dwellings. 2.8% of people identified as LGBTIQ+. The median age was 36.8 years (compared with 38.1 years nationally). There were 1,818 people (18.1%) aged under 15 years, 2,160 (21.5%) aged 15 to 29, 4,800 (47.7%) aged 30 to 64, and 1,275 (12.7%) aged 65 or older.

People could identify as more than one ethnicity. The results were 44.7% European (Pākehā); 5.1% Māori; 3.1% Pasifika; 50.0% Asian; 3.4% Middle Eastern, Latin American and African New Zealanders (MELAA); and 2.1% other, which includes people giving their ethnicity as "New Zealander". English was spoken by 89.5%, Māori language by 0.9%, Samoan by 0.4%, and other languages by 44.6%. No language could be spoken by 1.9% (e.g. too young to talk). New Zealand Sign Language was known by 0.2%. The percentage of people born overseas was 54.9, compared with 28.8% nationally.

Religious affiliations were 31.5% Christian, 2.5% Hindu, 2.8% Islam, 0.2% Māori religious beliefs, 2.2% Buddhist, 0.1% New Age, 0.2% Jewish, and 1.1% other religions. People who answered that they had no religion were 54.4%, and 5.1% of people did not answer the census question.

Of those at least 15 years old, 3,303 (40.1%) people had a bachelor's or higher degree, 3,111 (37.8%) had a post-high school certificate or diploma, and 1,815 (22.0%) people exclusively held high school qualifications. The median income was $44,100, compared with $41,500 nationally. 1,233 people (15.0%) earned over $100,000 compared to 12.1% nationally. The employment status of those at least 15 was that 4,452 (54.1%) people were employed full-time, 1,110 (13.5%) were part-time, and 237 (2.9%) were unemployed.

Individual statistical areas
Name	Area (km^{2})	Population	Density (per km^{2})	Dwellings	Median age	Median income
Forrest Hill North	0.74	2,472	3,341	759	36.3 years	$42,800
Forrest Hill West	1.24	4,053	3,269	1,221	37.0 years	$40,700
Forrest Hill East	0.92	3,528	3,835	1,182	36.9 years	$49,500
New Zealand					38.1 years	$41,500

== Association football ==
Forrest Hill is home to Forrest Hill Milford who compete in the Lotto Sport Italia NRFL Premier.

== Education ==
Forrest Hill School is a coeducational contributing primary (years 1–6) school with a roll of 464 students as of July 2025.

== Notable people ==
- Stephen Berry (born 1983), politician and political commentator.
