= Bayview, New Zealand =

Bayview
- Suburb
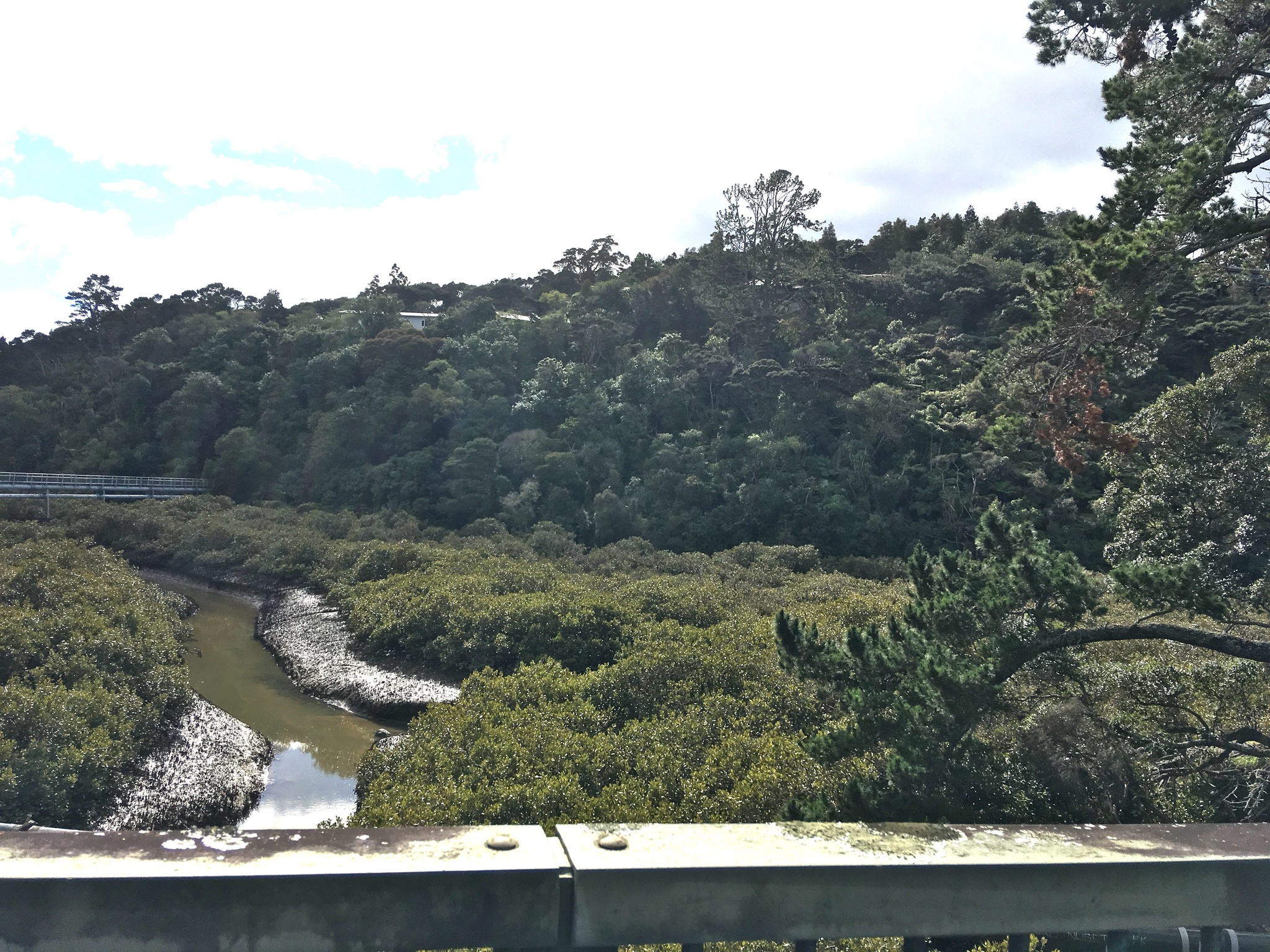
- View of Bayview from the Kaipatiki Creek
- Interactive map of Bayview
- Coordinates: 36.773°S 174.708°E
- Country: New Zealand
- City: Auckland
- Local authority: Auckland Council
- Electoral ward: North Shore ward; Albany ward
- Local board: Kaipātiki Local Board; Upper Harbour Local Board

Area
  - Land: 304 ha (750 acres)

Population (June 2025)
  - Total: 9,790
  - Density: 3,220/km^{2} (8,340/sq mi)
- Postcode: 0629

Greenhithe	Unsworth Heights	Totara Vale
Greenhithe	Bayview	Glenfield
Beach Haven	Birkdale	Glenfield

Bayview is a suburb of Auckland in New Zealand. The area was included into the North Shore ward in 2010, one of the new thirteen administrative areas of the new Auckland Council.

== Demographics ==
Bayview covers 3.04 km^{2} (1.17 sq mi) and had an estimated population of 9,790 as of June 2025, with a population density of 3,220 people per km^{2}.

Historical population
Year	Pop.	±% p.a.
2006	7,869	—
2013	8,409	+0.95%
2018	9,057	+1.50%
2023	9,030	−0.06%

Bayview had a population of 9,030 in the 2023 New Zealand census, a decrease of 27 people (−0.3%) since the 2018 census, and an increase of 621 people (7.4%) since the 2013 census. There were 4,515 males, 4,479 females and 39 people of other genders in 2,910 dwellings. 4.4% of people identified as LGBTIQ+. The median age was 34.7 years (compared with 38.1 years nationally). There were 1,764 people (19.5%) aged under 15 years, 1,848 (20.5%) aged 15 to 29, 4,590 (50.8%) aged 30 to 64, and 828 (9.2%) aged 65 or older.

People could identify as more than one ethnicity. The results were 49.5% European (Pākehā); 9.3% Māori; 7.2% Pasifika; 40.6% Asian; 3.8% Middle Eastern, Latin American and African New Zealanders (MELAA); and 2.9% other, which includes people giving their ethnicity as "New Zealander". English was spoken by 92.6%, Māori language by 1.6%, Samoan by 1.2%, and other languages by 34.8%. No language could be spoken by 2.7% (e.g. too young to talk). New Zealand Sign Language was known by 0.3%. The percentage of people born overseas was 49.8, compared with 28.8% nationally.

Religious affiliations were 34.2% Christian, 4.2% Hindu, 2.3% Islam, 0.3% Māori religious beliefs, 2.2% Buddhist, 0.4% New Age, 0.2% Jewish, and 1.8% other religions. People who answered that they had no religion were 48.2%, and 6.5% of people did not answer the census question.

Individual statistical areas
Name	Area (km^{2})	Population	Density (per km^{2})	Dwellings	Median age	Median income
Bayview East	1.37	3,732	2,724	1,170	34.1 years	$50,600
Bayview West	0.73	2,364	3,238	765	34.9 years	$50,800
Bayview South	0.93	2,931	3,152	975	35.3 years	$52,100
New Zealand					38.1 years	$41,500

Of those at least 15 years old, 2,034 (28.0%) people had a bachelor's or higher degree, 3,033 (41.7%) had a post-high school certificate or diploma, and 1,692 (23.3%) people exclusively held high school qualifications. The median income was $51,100, compared with $41,500 nationally. 924 people (12.7%) earned over $100,000 compared to 12.1% nationally. The employment status of those at least 15 was that 4,404 (60.6%) people were employed full-time, 945 (13.0%) were part-time, and 168 (2.3%) were unemployed.

== Education ==
Bayview School is a coeducational contributing primary (years 1–6) school with a roll of 394 students as of July 2025. The adjoining Bayview Community Centre has an Early Learning Centre for pre-schoolers, while Bayview Kindergarten offers pre-school education for 3-5 year olds.

Manuka Primary School is a coeducational contributing primary school (years 1–6) with a roll of 266 students as of July 2025. The school was founded in 1968.

== Amenities ==
Bayview is home to Manuka Reserve, a nature reserve that includes kauri trees, some with a diameter of over two metres, estimated to be 800 years old.
