= Kaipātiki Local Board =

Coordinates: 36.780837°S 174.7228567°E

Kaipātiki Local Board Te Poari ā-Rohe o Kaipātiki
- Local board of Auckland Council
- Country: New Zealand
- Region: Auckland
- Territorial authority: Auckland Council
- Ward: North Shore Ward
- Legislated: 2010

Area
  - Land: 34.08 km^{2} (13.16 sq mi)

Population (June 2025)
  - Total: 95,600
  - Density: 2,810/km^{2} (7,270/sq mi)

Local Board Members

Leadership
- Chairperson: Danielle Grant, Shore Action
- Deputy chairperson: Melanie Kenrick, Shore Action

Structure
- Seats: 8
- Political groups: Shore Action (7); Independents (1)
- Length of term: 3 years

Elections
- Last election: 2025
- Next election: 2028

Meeting place
- 90 Bentley Ave, Glenfield

The Kaipātiki Local Board is one of the 21 local boards of Auckland Council, and is one of the two boards overseen by the council's North Shore Ward councillors. It covers Glenfield south to Northcote Point. Its eastern border is the Northern Motorway and its western border is the Waitematā Harbour. The board sits within the Glenfield Library building on Bentley Ave, Glenfield. AUT's Akoranga Campus is the only tertiary institution in the North Shore ward, and it is in the Kaipātiki board area.

== Geography ==
It includes the suburbs of Totara Vale, Wairau Valley, Bayview, Glenfield, Birkdale, Beach Haven, Hillcrest, Chatswood, Northcote, Northcote Point and Birkenhead.

== Demographics ==
Kaipātiki Local Board Area covers 34.08 km^{2} (13.16 sq mi) and had an estimated population of 95,600 as of June 2025, with a population density of 2,805 people per km^{2}.

Historical population
Year	Pop.	±% p.a.
2006	79,128	—
2013	82,494	+0.60%
2018	88,269	+1.36%
2023	88,128	−0.03%

Kaipātiki had a population of 88,128 in the 2023 New Zealand census, a decrease of 141 people (−0.2%) since the 2018 census, and an increase of 5,634 people (6.8%) since the 2013 census. There were 43,440 males, 44,343 females and 345 people of other genders in 29,928 dwellings. 4.0% of people identified as LGBTIQ+. The median age was 36.1 years (compared with 38.1 years nationally). There were 16,125 people (18.3%) aged under 15 years, 17,787 (20.2%) aged 15 to 29, 42,936 (48.7%) aged 30 to 64, and 11,283 (12.8%) aged 65 or older.

People could identify as more than one ethnicity. The results were 56.5% European (Pākehā); 9.4% Māori; 6.6% Pasifika; 34.8% Asian; 3.6% Middle Eastern, Latin American and African New Zealanders (MELAA); and 2.2% other, which includes people giving their ethnicity as "New Zealander". English was spoken by 92.3%, Māori language by 1.9%, Samoan by 1.1%, and other languages by 31.8%. No language could be spoken by 2.5% (e.g. too young to talk). New Zealand Sign Language was known by 0.3%. The percentage of people born overseas was 45.9, compared with 28.8% nationally.

Religious affiliations were 32.6% Christian, 3.3% Hindu, 1.8% Islam, 0.4% Māori religious beliefs, 2.0% Buddhist, 0.4% New Age, 0.1% Jewish, and 1.6% other religions. People who answered that they had no religion were 52.0%, and 5.9% of people did not answer the census question.

Of those at least 15 years old, 27,108 (37.6%) people had a bachelor's or higher degree, 28,863 (40.1%) had a post-high school certificate or diploma, and 16,032 (22.3%) people exclusively held high school qualifications. The median income was $50,000, compared with $41,500 nationally. 11,682 people (16.2%) earned over $100,000 compared to 12.1% nationally. The employment status of those at least 15 was that 41,247 (57.3%) people were employed full-time, 8,976 (12.5%) were part-time, and 1,893 (2.6%) were unemployed.

== 2025-2028 term ==
The current board members for the 2025-2028 term, elected at the 2025 local elections, are:

Name	Affiliation	Position
Danielle Grant	Shore Action	Chairperson
Melanie Kenrick	Shore Action	Deputy Chairperson
Paula Gillon	Shore Action	Board member
Janet Tupou	Shore Action	Board member
Tim Spring	Shore Action	Board member
Dr Raymond Tang	Shore Action	Board member
Dave Kaio	Shore Action	Board member
Emma Ryburn-Phengsavath	Independent	Board member

== 2022-2025 term ==
The board members for the 2022-2025 term, elected in the 2022 Auckland local elections, were:

Name	Party	Position
John Gillon	Shore Action	Chairperson
Danielle Grant	Shore Action	Deputy Chairperson
Paula Gillon	Shore Action	
Melanie Kenrick	Shore Action	
Adrian Tyler	Shore Action	
Janet Tupou	Shore Action	
Erica Hannam	Shore Action	
Tim Spring	Shore Action	

== Election results ==
=== 2022 Election results ===
The results of the 2022 local board election.

Name	Party	Votes
John Gillon	Shore Action	**12,090**
Danielle Grant	Shore Action	**11,940**
Paula Gillon	Shore Action	**10,499**
Melanie Kenrick	Shore Action	**9,067**
Adrian Tyler	Shore Action	**8,368**
Janet Tupou	Shore Action	**7,029**
Erica Hannam	Shore Action	**6,011**
Tim Spring	Shore Action	**5,923**
Raymond Tan		5,878
Andrew Shaw	Living Kaipātiki	5,800
Dave Kaio	Labour	5,487
Matthew Campbell	Labour	5,140
Liz Hurley	Labour	5,135
Lleuarne Panoho	Labour	4,974
Sesalina Setu	Labour	4,923
Ngozi Penson	Independent	4,654
Ryan Nicholls	Living Kaipātiki	3,624
Joe Zhou		3,264
Daniel Bercich	Independent	3,195
Emma Ryburn-Phengsavath		2,819
Tim Marshall	Independent	2,139
Murrey Dearlove		1,440
Mark Lowrie		527
**INFORMAL**		59
**BLANK**		1552

=== 2019 Election results ===
The following table is the results from the election. Those in bold won seats.

Name	Party	Votes
John Gillon	Shore Action	**9810**
Danielle Grant	Shore Action	**9522**
Paula Gillon	Shore Action	**8615**
Melanie Kenrick	Shore Action	**8048**
Ann Hartley	Kaipātiki Voice	**7941**
Cindy Schmidt	Kaipātiki Voice	**7838**
Adrian Tyler	Shore Action	**7492**
Andrew Shaw	Kaipātiki Voice	**6021**
Louis Hartley	Kaipātiki Voice	5924
Anne-Elise Smithson	Shore Action	5836
Frances Waaka	Kaipātiki Voice	5470
Shannon Leilua	Kaipātiki Voice	5016
Trevor Courtier	Independent	4329
Jesse Jenson	Independent	3134
Murrey Dearlove		2742
**INFORMAL**		37
**BLANK**		1195

=== 2016 results ===
Name	Party	Votes
Richard Hills	Kaipātiki Voice	13026
Ann Hartley	Kaipātiki Voice	**11084**
John Gillon	Shore Action	**10766**
Paula Gillon	Shore Action	**8921**
Kay McIntyre	Kaipātiki Voice	**8906**
Lindsay Waugh	Kaipātiki Voice	**8747**
Danielle Grant	Auckland Future	**7700**
Anne-Elise Smithson	Shore Action	**7014**
Adrian Tyler	Shore Action	**6934**
Sarah Nilson	Shore Action	6279
Frances Waaka	Independent	4935
Rebecca Shall	Kaipātiki Voice	4723
Lisa Ducat	Shore Action	4699
Trevor Courtier	Independent	4433
Ghadair Alshemari	Independent	4142
Kevin Moorhead		3961
Kevin O'Grady		3424
**INFORMAL**		64
**BLANK**		1640

Richard Hills became ineligible to be elected to the local board, despite being the highest polling candidate, as he was elected North Shore Ward Councillor.
