= Unsworth Heights =

- Suburb
- Interactive map of Unsworth Heights
- Coordinates: 36.759°S 174.718°E
- Country: New Zealand
- City: Auckland
- Local authority: Auckland Council
- Electoral ward: Albany ward
- Local board: Upper Harbour Local Board

Area
  - Land: 193 ha (480 acres)

Population (June 2025)
  - Total: 6,650
  - Density: 3,450/km^{2} (8,920/sq mi)
- Postcode: 0632

Rosedale	Rosedale	Windsor Park
Schnapper Rock	Unsworth Heights	Tōtara Vale
Bayview	Bayview	Tōtara Vale

Unsworth Heights is a suburb of North Shore in the Auckland metropolitan area in northern New Zealand. New Zealand State Highway 18 (Upper Harbour Highway) passes to the north of the suburb, and the Albany Highway to the south. The two routes intersect just to the west of Unsworth Heights. Unsworth Reserve is to the east.

== Demographics ==
Unsworth Heights covers 1.93 km^{2} (0.75 sq mi) and had an estimated population of 6,650 as of June 2025, with a population density of 3,446 people per km^{2}.

Historical population
Year	Pop.	±% p.a.
2006	5,250	—
2013	5,811	+1.46%
2018	6,204	+1.32%
2023	6,348	+0.46%
The 2006 population is for a smaller area of 1.86 km^{2}. Source:

Unsworth Heights had a population of 6,348 in the 2023 New Zealand census, an increase of 144 people (2.3%) since the 2018 census, and an increase of 537 people (9.2%) since the 2013 census. There were 3,099 males, 3,234 females and 18 people of other genders in 2,199 dwellings. 3.2% of people identified as LGBTIQ+. The median age was 39.6 years (compared with 38.1 years nationally). There were 936 people (14.7%) aged under 15 years, 1,224 (19.3%) aged 15 to 29, 2,943 (46.4%) aged 30 to 64, and 1,245 (19.6%) aged 65 or older.

People could identify as more than one ethnicity. The results were 43.2% European (Pākehā); 6.0% Māori; 4.0% Pasifika; 44.2% Asian; 9.1% Middle Eastern, Latin American and African New Zealanders (MELAA); and 3.5% other, which includes people giving their ethnicity as "New Zealander". English was spoken by 90.6%, Māori language by 1.1%, Samoan by 0.7%, and other languages by 41.4%. No language could be spoken by 2.1% (e.g. too young to talk). New Zealand Sign Language was known by 0.3%. The percentage of people born overseas was 55.8, compared with 28.8% nationally.

Religious affiliations were 40.2% Christian, 4.0% Hindu, 3.5% Islam, 0.2% Māori religious beliefs, 2.7% Buddhist, 0.2% New Age, 0.1% Jewish, and 1.8% other religions. People who answered that they had no religion were 41.8%, and 5.7% of people did not answer the census question.

Of those at least 15 years old, 1,539 (28.4%) people had a bachelor's or higher degree, 2,118 (39.1%) had a post-high school certificate or diploma, and 1,389 (25.7%) people exclusively held high school qualifications. The median income was $41,400, compared with $41,500 nationally. 606 people (11.2%) earned over $100,000 compared to 12.1% nationally. The employment status of those at least 15 was that 2,790 (51.6%) people were employed full-time, 654 (12.1%) were part-time, and 120 (2.2%) were unemployed.

Individual statistical areas
Name	Area (km^{2})	Population	Density (per km^{2})	Dwellings	Median age	Median income
Unsworth Heights West	0.82	2,631	3,209	849	39.8 years	$43,000
Unsworth Heights East	1.11	3,714	3,346	1,347	39.4 years	$40,200
New Zealand					38.1 years	$41,500

== Education ==
Westminster Christian School was established in 1981 to provide education for children of Christian families, using a Christ-centred curriculum founded on a Biblical World View. It is an inter-denominational, state-integrated, co-educational, full primary school for students from New Entrant to Year 8. The school has a roll of 369 students as of July 2025.
