= Beach Haven, New Zealand =

Beach Haven
- Suburb
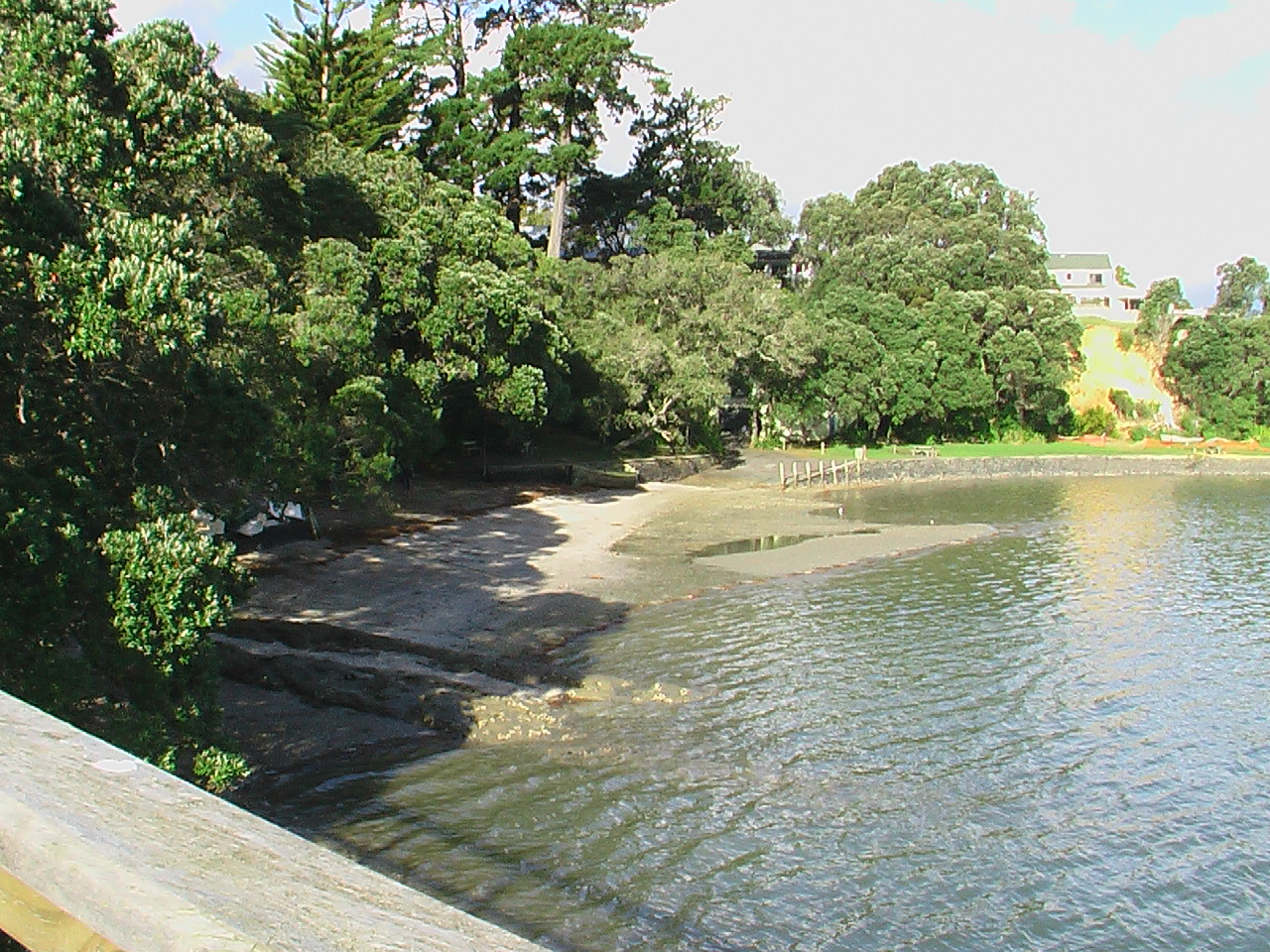
- View of the beach at Beach Haven from Beach Haven Wharf
- Interactive map of Beach Haven
- Coordinates: 36.8004°S 174.6907°E
- Country: New Zealand
- City: Auckland
- Local authority: Auckland Council
- Electoral ward: North Shore ward
- Local board: Kaipātiki Local Board
- Established: 1922

Area
  - Land: 367 ha (910 acres)

Population (June 2025)
  - Total: 11,550
  - Density: 3,150/km^{2} (8,150/sq mi)
- Postcode: 0626
- Ferry terminals: (Beach Haven Wharf)
- Hospitals: (Beach Haven Hospice)

(Waitematā Harbour), Greenhithe	(Waitematā Harbour), Greenhithe	Bayview
(Waitematā Harbour), Hobsonville	Beach Haven	Birkdale
(Waitematā Harbour)	Birkdale	Birkdale

Beach Haven is a northwestern suburb of the North Shore, located in Auckland, New Zealand. It was originally a small area of holiday baches in the larger suburb of Birkdale. The area has gentrified rapidly over recent years as young professionals moved into the area.

== Geography ==
Beach Haven is located on the western North Shore, on the eastern shores of the Upper Waitematā Harbour. Southern Beach Haven is a suburban area known as Kauri Park.

== History ==
Prior to European settlement, the Beach Haven area was covered to the water's edge by thick bush, pōhutukawa, ferns and giant kauri trees. Maori tribes inhabited the area, but were decimated by wars and finally succumbed to the newly acquired guns of Hongi Hika. In 1844 the area was sold to the Government and became deserted. One of the first settlers in the district established an orchard near Soldier's Bay and as the kauri trees were gradually removed from the land, it was found to be an ideal place for fruit growing, especially grapes and strawberries. Most of the kauri trees taken out were used by boat builders for masts and spurs.

The first European settlers arrived in the 1860s and by the 1880s the area was a popular summer resort, with many city dwellers making the trip across the harbour to Island Bay for excursions and holidays.

Historically Beach Haven, along with neighbouring Birkdale served as a market garden for Auckland. Beach Haven also had sawmills and baches.

In 1923, the Birkdale Land Company bought and surveyed the land around where the wharf is now and it was then marketed as the Beach Haven Estate, "the Gem of the Waitemata."

After the construction of the Harbour Bridge in 1959, housing subdivisions completed the transformation into an urban area.

== Demographics ==
Beach Haven covers 3.67 km^{2} (1.42 sq mi) and had an estimated population of 11,550 as of June 2025, with a population density of 3,147 people per km^{2}.

Historical population
Year	Pop.	±% p.a.
2006	9,831	—
2013	10,134	+0.43%
2018	10,563	+0.83%
2023	10,845	+0.53%

Beach Haven had a population of 10,845 in the 2023 New Zealand census, an increase of 282 people (2.7%) since the 2018 census, and an increase of 711 people (7.0%) since the 2013 census. There were 5,310 males, 5,484 females and 48 people of other genders in 3,738 dwellings. 3.8% of people identified as LGBTIQ+. The median age was 35.4 years (compared with 38.1 years nationally). There were 2,403 people (22.2%) aged under 15 years, 1,971 (18.2%) aged 15 to 29, 5,274 (48.6%) aged 30 to 64, and 1,194 (11.0%) aged 65 or older.

People could identify as more than one ethnicity. The results were 71.3% European (Pākehā); 15.8% Māori; 12.4% Pasifika; 15.0% Asian; 2.9% Middle Eastern, Latin American and African New Zealanders (MELAA); and 2.1% other, which includes people giving their ethnicity as "New Zealander". English was spoken by 94.4%, Māori language by 3.5%, Samoan by 2.5%, and other languages by 19.6%. No language could be spoken by 3.3% (e.g. too young to talk). New Zealand Sign Language was known by 0.4%. The percentage of people born overseas was 33.1, compared with 28.8% nationally.

Religious affiliations were 29.5% Christian, 1.6% Hindu, 1.4% Islam, 0.9% Māori religious beliefs, 0.9% Buddhist, 0.7% New Age, 0.2% Jewish, and 1.5% other religions. People who answered that they had no religion were 56.4%, and 7.1% of people did not answer the census question.

Of those at least 15 years old, 2,853 (33.8%) people had a bachelor's or higher degree, 3,822 (45.3%) had a post-high school certificate or diploma, and 1,767 (20.9%) people exclusively held high school qualifications. The median income was $51,100, compared with $41,500 nationally. 1,611 people (19.1%) earned over $100,000 compared to 12.1% nationally. The employment status of those at least 15 was that 4,845 (57.4%) people were employed full-time, 1,038 (12.3%) were part-time, and 282 (3.3%) were unemployed.

Individual statistical areas
Name	Area (km^{2})	Population	Density (per km^{2})	Dwellings	Median age	Median income
Beach Haven West	1.21	3,429	2,834	1,254	36.6 years	$52,400
Beach Haven East	1.12	4,212	3,761	1,362	32.2 years	$44,100
Beach Haven South	1.34	3,204	2,391	1,119	39.2 years	$58,500
New Zealand					38.1 years	$41,500

== Administration ==
Beach Haven forms part of the North Shore ward and Kaipatiki Local Board under the Auckland Council. Prior to 2010, the area had been administered as part of the Birkenhead Borough Council and then as part of North Shore City Council.

Under the voting district for elections to the Parliament of New Zealand it forms part of the Northcote electorate.

== Facilities, services and amenities ==
Beach Haven has one main shopping area with a variety of shops, including a cafe, two bakeries, a Domino's pizza outlet and a laundromat. There are several preschools and one primary school that serve the area. Churches in the area include the Anglican, Catholic, Orthodox, Mormon and Assembly Of God.

Beach Haven is surrounded by many beaches which are suitable for swimming, including Charcoal Bay which is considered one of the most beautiful bays in the Waitematā Harbour. The area also has a wharf which is a very popular feature of Beach Haven. The first wharf was built in 1887. It was known for decades as the Birkdale wharf and occasionally the Hellyers' Creek wharf. The biggest park in Beach Haven is Shepherds Park which has a 1.6 km walk through native bush beside Oruamo or Hellyers Creek, as well as squash, bowling and tennis facilities. It also has rugby and soccer grounds and is home to Birkenhead United AFC.

Beach Haven is well serviced by bus connections to Glenfield, Takapuna and the CBD. In August 2012 after years of delays, Auckland Transport announced that it would spend NZ$1.35m to upgrade the wharf at Beach Haven, allowing a ferry service to the city to begin at the start of 2013 to coincide with a new service to Hobsonville. It was expected that this new service will ease traffic congestion on Onewa Road and service the wider areas of Glenfield and Birkdale. The ferry service opened with five sailings a day in February 2013. Beach Haven and Hobsonville wharves are the first new ferry services to be built in Auckland in 50 years.

Beach Haven is known for House of Chocolate (formerly La Maison du Chocolat), a working chocolate factory that was established in 1999. The shop closed down and relocated to Point Chevalier in 2025.

== Culture & community ==
A garden project (funded by local council) began construction in April 2015 and was completed by the end of the year.

In 2013, the community learned that the Beach Haven Methodist Church – which sits on a prominent site in the village – was to be demolished by the Lifewise trust to make way for accessible housing units. The church was built by the community in one day in 1939 using donated timber. "We are dismayed at the prospect of losing the old church building which was built in 1939 in one day by the Beach Haven community," said Lisbeth Alley of the Heart of Beach Haven group. The group and the trust have committed to working together to find a way of keeping the church.

Methodist Mission Northern's property development arm, Airedale Property Trust, spent years discussing the church's future with the community. Bruce Stone, chief executive, said APT was approached by the church to put the land to better use for the community. "There is a shortage of purpose-built housing for people with disabilities," Stone said. "This [development] allows the church to use land in a new way. If [the church] could have been retained on site and used as a part of development, it would have been."

In 2013, the Kaipatiki Community Policing Project won a national award. Kainga Ora have been building high density social housing complexes in the area since 2016.

The hip hop artist Sir T. grew up in Beach Haven and often raps about the area.

== Housing ==
In October 2012, Metro magazine reported Beach Haven had shown one of the biggest increases in property prices in the city over the previous 10 years (admittedly off a lower base than other areas) and named it "One to watch". The magazine was particularly enthusiastic about Island Bay Road. In 2014, Metro named Beach Haven one of Auckland's hottest suburbs, noting: "A new ferry service, a meandering coastline offering all sorts of delights and a growing sense of community make Beach Haven one of the new hot spots. Still pretty cheap, but we doubt it will stay that way."

Houses are a mix of original character baches, 1950s and 1960s bungalows, apartments as well as architecturally designed homes near the water. Many houses have waterfront access and jetties.

== Education ==
Beach Haven School is a coeducational contributing primary (years 1-6) school with a roll of 420. Kauri Park School is a coeducational primary with a roll of 357. Rolls are as of July 2026. Both schools pride themselves on their multi-cultural make-up.

The local college is Birkenhead College, situated between Beach Haven and Birkdale.
