= Swimming at the 2012 Summer Paralympics – Women's 100 metre freestyle S11 =

Women's 100m Freestyle S11 at the XIV Paralympic Games
- Venue: London Aquatics Centre
- Dates: 31 August
- Competitors: 17 from 12 nations
- Winning time: 1:07.29

Medalists
1st place, gold medalist(s)		Cecilia Camellini	Italy
2nd place, silver medalist(s)		Mary Fisher	New Zealand
3rd place, bronze medalist(s)		Li Guizhi	China

The women's 100m freestyle S11 event at the 2012 Summer Paralympics took place at the London Aquatics Centre on 31 August. There were three heats; the swimmers with the eight fastest times advanced to the final.

== Results ==
=== Heats ===
Competed from 10:54.

==== Heat 1 ====
Rank	Lane	Name	Nationality	Time	Notes
1	4	Daniela Schulte	Germany	1:11.60	Q
2	3	Naomi Ikinaga	Japan	1:16.49	Q
3	6	Olga Iakibiuk	Ukraine	1:19.28	
4	5	Chantal Cavin	Switzerland	1:19.80	
5	7	Yana Berezhna	Ukraine	1:23.92	

==== Heat 2 ====
Rank	Lane	Name	Nationality	Time	Notes
1	5	Li Guizhi	China	1:09.38	Q
2	3	Mary Fisher	New Zealand	1:12.01	Q, OC
3	4	Xie Qing	China	1:14.01	Q
4	2	Chikako Ono	Japan	1:18.91	
5	6	Áine Kelly-Costello	New Zealand	1:23.10	
6	7	Renette Bloem	South Africa	1:25.72	AF

==== Heat 3 ====
Rank	Lane	Name	Nationality	Time	Notes
1	5	Amber Thomas	Canada	1:11.15	Q, AM
2	4	Cecilia Camellini	Italy	1:11.54	Q
3	3	Maja Reichard	Sweden	1:16.20	Q
4	7	Maryna Piddubna	Ukraine	1:18.53	
5	2	Letticia Martinez	United States	1:21.64	
6	6	Nadia Báez	Argentina	1:22.06	

=== Final ===
Competed at 19:09.

Rank	Lane	Name	Nationality	Time	Notes
1st place, gold medalist(s)	3	Cecilia Camellini	Italy	1:07.29	WR
2nd place, silver medalist(s)	2	Mary Fisher	New Zealand	1:09.83	OC
3rd place, bronze medalist(s)	4	Li Guizhi	China	1:10.25	
4	5	Amber Thomas	Canada	1:11.04	AM
5	7	Xie Qing	China	1:11.08	
6	6	Daniela Schulte	Germany	1:11.50	
7	1	Maja Reichard	Sweden	1:12.65	
8	8	Naomi Ikinaga	Japan	1:16.94	

'Q = qualified for final. WR = World Record. AM = Americas Record. AF = African Record. OC = Oceania Record.
