= Swimming at the 2012 Summer Paralympics – Women's 50 metre freestyle S11 =

Women's 50 metre freestyle S11 at the XIV Paralympic Games
- Venue: London Aquatics Centre
- Dates: 1 September
- Competitors: 20 from 14 nations

Medalists
1st place, gold medalist(s)		Cecilia Camellini	Italy
2nd place, silver medalist(s)		Li Guizhi	China
3rd place, bronze medalist(s)		Mary Fisher	New Zealand

The women's 50 metre freestyle S11 event at the 2012 Paralympic Games took place on 1 September, at the London Aquatics Centre.

Three heats were held, one with six swimmers, two with seven competitors each. The swimmers with the eight fastest times advanced to the final.

== Heats ==
Rank	Heat	Lane	Name	Nationality	Time	Notes
1	3	4	Cecilia Camellini	Italy	31.15	Q, WR
2	2	5	Li Guizhi	China	31.48	Q
3	1	3	Mary Fisher	New Zealand	32.19	Q, OC
4	1	5	Daniela Schulte	Germany	33.12	Q
5	1	4	Maja Reichard	Sweden	33.17	Q
6	3	3	Amber Thomas	Canada	33.17	Q
7	2	4	Xie Qing	China	33.74	Q
8	3	5	Naomi Ikinaga	Japan	33.97	Q
9	3	6	Letticia Martinez	United States	34.91	
10	2	3	Nadia Báez	Argentina	34.98	
11	2	6	Chantal Cavin	Switzerland	35.76	
12	3	7	Chikako Ono	Japan	35.80	
13	1	2	Maryna Piddubna	Ukraine	35.86	
14	2	2	Stéphanie Douard	France	36.41	
15	3	1	Irina Lavrova	Russia	36.43	
16	1	6	Rina Akiyama	Japan	36.44	
17	3	2	Aine Kelly-Costello	New Zealand	36.85	
18	2	7	Olga Iakibiuk	Ukraine	37.19	
19	2	1	Renette Bloem	South Africa	38.00	AF
20	1	7	Yana Berezhna	Ukraine	39.00	

== Final ==
Rank	Lane	Name	Nationality	Time	Notes
1st place, gold medalist(s)	4	Cecilia Camellini	Italy	30.94	WR
2nd place, silver medalist(s)	5	Li Guizhi	China	31.01	AS
3rd place, bronze medalist(s)	3	Mary Fisher	New Zealand	31.67	OC
4	1	Xie Qing	China	31.87	
5	2	Maja Reichard	Sweden	32.66	
6	7	Amber Thomas	Canada	32.94	
7	6	Daniela Schulte	Germany	33.00	
8	8	Naomi Ikinaga	Japan	33.13	
