= Swimming at the 2012 Summer Paralympics – Women's 200 metre individual medley SM11 =

Women's 200m Ind. Medley SM11 at the XIV Paralympic Games
- Venue: London Aquatics Centre
- Dates: 8 September
- Competitors: 17 from 13 nations
- Winning time: 2:46.91

Medalists
1st place, gold medalist(s)		Mary Fisher	New Zealand
2nd place, silver medalist(s)		Daniela Schulte	Germany
3rd place, bronze medalist(s)		Amber Thomas	Canada

The women's 200m ind. medley SM11 event at the 2012 Summer Paralympics took place at the London Aquatics Centre on 8 September. There were three heats; the swimmers with the eight fastest times advanced to the final.

== Results ==
=== Heats ===
Competed from 11:11.

==== Heat 1 ====
Rank	Lane	Name	Nationality	Time	Notes
1	5	Amber Thomas	Canada	2:58.76	Q, PR
2	4	Cecilia Camellini	Italy	3:01.73	Q
3	6	Maja Reichard	Sweden	3:03.72	Q
4	3	Naomi Ikinaga	Japan	3:15.14	
5	2	Renette Bloem	South Africa	3:37.13	

==== Heat 2 ====
Rank	Lane	Name	Nationality	Time	Notes
1	4	Xie Qing	China	3:08.95	Q
2	3	Stephanie Douard	France	3:12.09	Q
3	6	Letticia Martinez	United States	3:14.42	
4	5	Olga Iakibiuk	Ukraine	3:15.53	
5	7	Rina Akiyama	Japan	3:23.63	
6	2	Olga Sokolova	Russia	3:24.81	

==== Heat 3 ====
Rank	Lane	Name	Nationality	Time	Notes
1	4	Daniela Schulte	Germany	2:48.86	Q, WR
2	5	Mary Fisher	New Zealand	2:51.90	Q, OC
3	6	Maryna Piddubna	Ukraine	3:04.93	Q
4	2	Yana Berezhna	Ukraine	3:13.10	
5	3	Nadia Baez	Argentina	3:17.12	
6	7	Chikako Ono	Japan	3:23.34	

=== Final ===
Competed at 19:34.

Rank	Lane	Name	Nationality	Time	Notes
1st place, gold medalist(s)	5	Mary Fisher	New Zealand	2:46.91	WR
2nd place, silver medalist(s)	4	Daniela Schulte	Germany	2:49.57	
3rd place, bronze medalist(s)	3	Amber Thomas	Canada	2:59.00	
4	2	Maja Reichard	Sweden	3:00.08	
5	1	Xie Qing	China	3:00.46	
6	6	Cecilia Camellini	Italy	3:01.86	
7	7	Maryna Piddubna	Ukraine	3:06.28	
8	8	Stephanie Douard	France	3:12.44	

'Q = qualified for final. WR = World Record. PR = Paralympic Record. OC = Oceania Record.
