= Swimming at the 2016 Summer Paralympics – Women's 50 metre freestyle S11 =

Women's 50 metre freestyle S11 at the XV Paralympic Games
- Venue: Olympic Aquatics Stadium
- Dates: 12 September 2016
- Competitors: 19 from 11 nations

Medalists
1st place, gold medalist(s)		Guizhi Li	China
2nd place, silver medalist(s)		Maja Reichard	Sweden
3rd place, bronze medalist(s)		Maryna Piddubna	Ukraine
3rd place, bronze medalist(s)		Liesette Bruinsma	Netherlands

The women's 50 metre freestyle S11 event at the 2016 Paralympic Games took place on 12 September 2016, at the Olympic Aquatics Stadium. Three heats were held. The swimmers with the eight fastest times advanced to the final.

== Heats ==
=== Heat 1 ===
10:33 12 September 2016:

Rank	Lane	Name	Nationality	Time	Notes
1	4	Guizhi Li	China	30.89	PR Q
2	5	Maryna Piddubna	Ukraine	31.41	Q
3	3	Letticia Martinez	United States	32.86	
4	6	Naomi Ikinaga	Japan	35.43	
5	2	Chikako Ono	Japan	36.71	

=== Heat 2 ===
10:37 12 September 2016:

Rank	Lane	Name	Nationality	Time	Notes
1	4	Maja Reichard	Sweden	31.05	Q
2	5	Cecilia Camellini	Italy	31.52	Q
3	6	Liwen Cai	China	32.86	
4	3	Regiane Nunes Silva	Brazil	33.74	
5	7	Martina Rabbolini	Italy	34.88	
6	2	Nadia Baez	Argentina	36.51	

=== Heat 3 ===
10:40 12 September 2016:

Rank	Lane	Name	Nationality	Time	Notes
1	5	Mary Fisher	New Zealand	31.35	Q
2	4	Liesette Bruinsma	Netherlands	31.81	Q
3	3	Qing Xie	China	31.95	Q
4	2	Elisabeth Egel	Estonia	33.49	
5	7	Olga Iakibiuk	Ukraine	35.68	
6	6	Kateryna Tkachuk	Ukraine	35.98	

=== Swim off ===
12:05 12 September 2016:

Rank	Lane	Name	Nationality	Time	Notes
1	5	Liwen Cai	China	32.20	Q
2	4	Letticia Martinez	United States	32.74	

== Final ==
18:15 12 September 2016:

Rank	Lane	Name	Nationality	Time	Notes
1st place, gold medalist(s)	4	Guizhi Li	China	30.73	WR
2nd place, silver medalist(s)	5	Maja Reichard	Sweden	30.76	
3rd place, bronze medalist(s)	6	Maryna Piddubna	Ukraine	31.23	
3rd place, bronze medalist(s)	7	Liesette Bruinsma	Netherlands	31.23	
5	2	Cecilia Camellini	Italy	31.71	
6	3	Mary Fisher	New Zealand	31.80	
7	1	Qing Xie	China	32.00	
8	8	Liwen Cai	China	32.31	
