= Swimming at the 2016 Summer Paralympics – Women's 400 metre freestyle S11 =

Women's 400 metre freestyle S11 at the XV Paralympic Games
- Venue: Olympic Aquatics Stadium
- Dates: 10 September 2016
- Competitors: 12 from 8 nations

Medalists
1st place, gold medalist(s)		Liesette Bruinsma	Netherlands
2nd place, silver medalist(s)		Cecilia Camellini	Italy
3rd place, bronze medalist(s)		Qing Xie	China

The women's 400 metre freestyle S11 event at the 2016 Paralympic Games took place on 10 September 2016, at the Olympic Aquatics Stadium. Two heats were held. The swimmers with the eight fastest times advanced to the final.

== Heats ==
=== Heat 1 ===
11:23 10 September 2016:

Rank	Lane	Name	Nationality	Time	Notes
1	5	Cecilia Camellini	Italy	5:19.17	Q
2	4	Daniela Schulte	Germany	5:27.41	Q
3	3	Liwen Cai	China	5:43.41	Q
4	6	Kateryna Tkachuk	Ukraine	5:47.45	
5	7	Martina Rabbolini	Italy	5:51.70	
6	2	Chikako Ono	Japan	5:57.78	

=== Heat 2 ===
11:32 10 September 2016:

Rank	Lane	Name	Nationality	Time	Notes
1	4	Liesette Bruinsma	Netherlands	5:20.04	Q
2	5	Mary Fisher	New Zealand	5:33.64	Q
3	3	Qing Xie	China	5:34.81	Q
4	6	Guizhi Li	China	5:42.18	Q
5	2	Olga Iakibiuk	Ukraine	5:44.15	Q
6	7	Regiane Nunes Silva	Brazil	5:47.84	

== Final ==
20:04 10 September 2016:

Rank	Lane	Name	Nationality	Time	Notes
1st place, gold medalist(s)	5	Liesette Bruinsma	Netherlands	5:15.08	
2nd place, silver medalist(s)	4	Cecilia Camellini	Italy	5:16.36	
3rd place, bronze medalist(s)	2	Qing Xie	China	5:25.14	
4	6	Mary Fisher	New Zealand	5:28.28	
5	3	Daniela Schulte	Germany	5:29.93	
6	1	Liwen Cai	China	5:35.82	
7	8	Olga Iakibiuk	Ukraine	5:46.06	
8	7	Guizhi Li	China	5:52.79	
