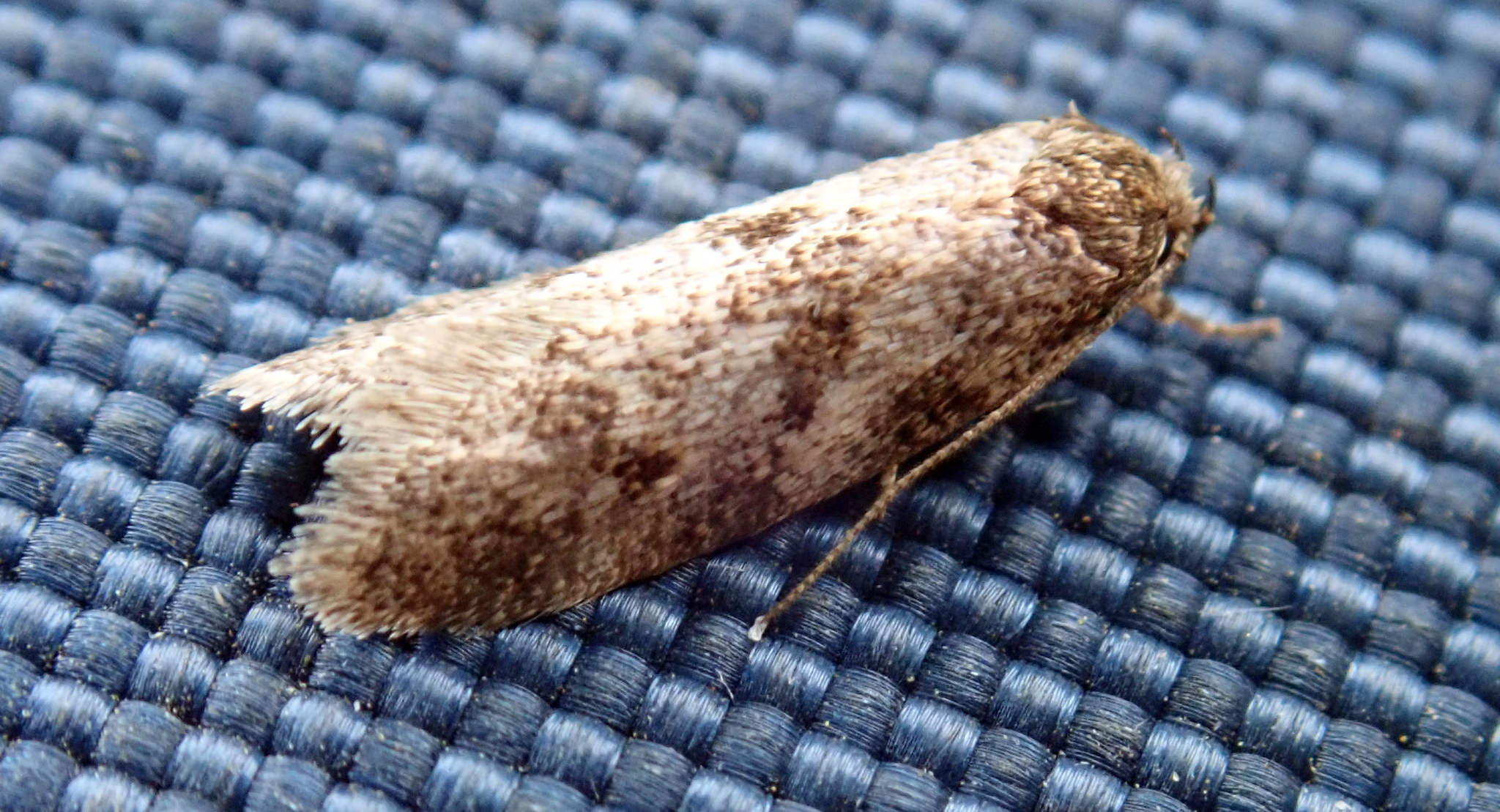

Scientific classification
- Kingdom: Animalia
- Phylum: Arthropoda
- Class: Insecta
- Order: Lepidoptera
- Family: Oecophoridae
- Genus: Tingena
- Species: T. clarkei

Binomial name
- Tingena clarkei (Philpott, 1928)

Synonyms
- Borkhausenia clarkei Philpott, 1928

= Tingena clarkei =

Species of moth, endemic to New Zealand

Tingena clarkei is a species of moth in the family Oecophoridae. It is endemic to New Zealand and has been observed in the North and South Island. This species is on the wing from November until February and inhabits open scrubland or native forest. This species is similar in appearance to Trachypepla photinella.

== Taxonomy ==
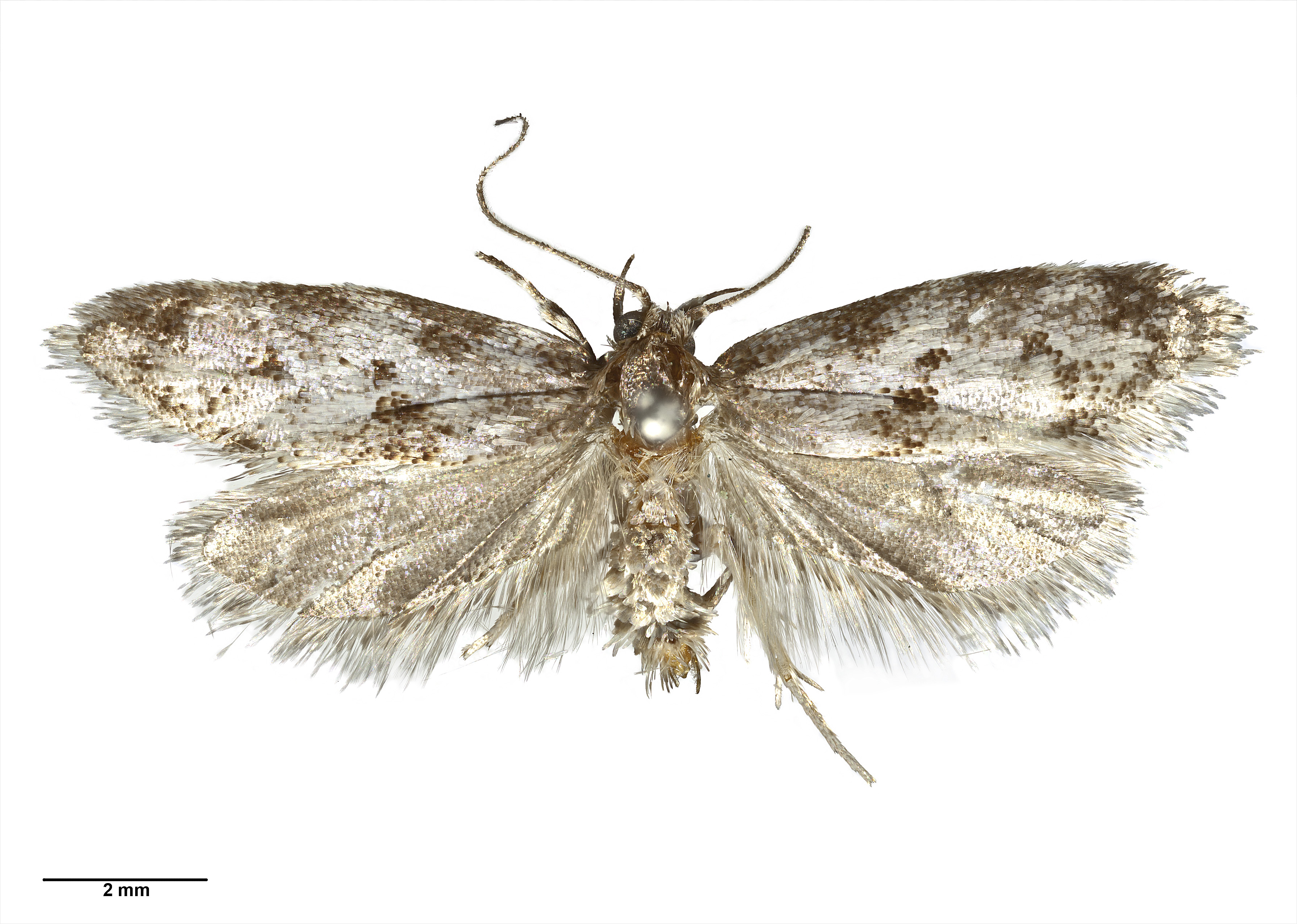
Holotype of T. clarkei.

This species was first described by Alfred Philpott in 1928 using specimens collected by C. E. Clarke in Waikaraka Valley and Kauri Gully, Auckland in January, and named Borkhausenia clarkei. George Hudson discussed this species under the name B. clarkei in his 1939 publication A supplement to the butterflies and moths of New Zealand. In 1988 J. S. Dugdale placed this species in the genus Tingena. The male holotype specimen, collected in Kauri Gully, Birkenhead, is held at the Auckland Museum.

== Description ==
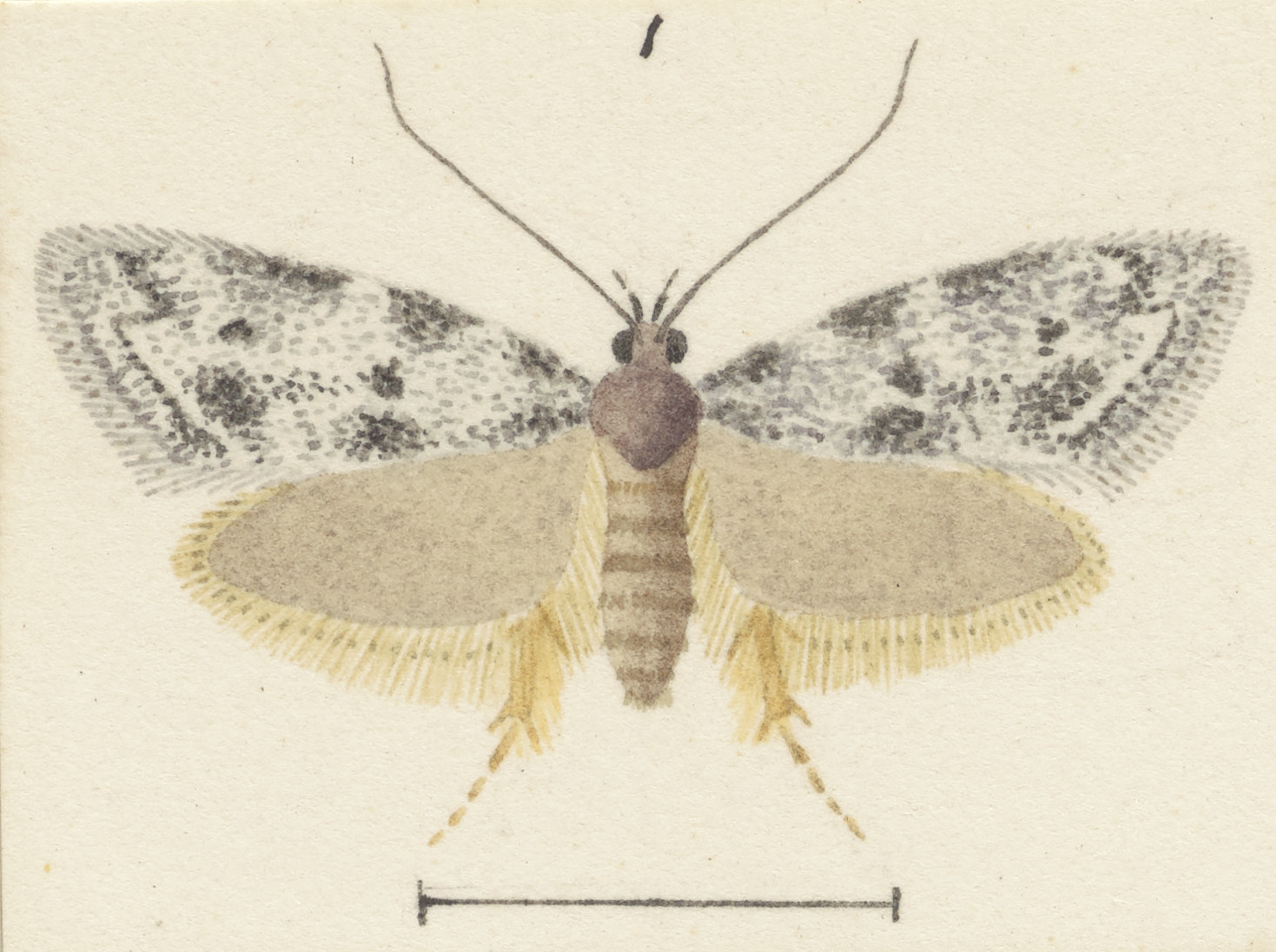
Illustration of T. clarkei by George Hudson.

Philpott described this species as follows:

♂. 15–16 mm. Head and antennae greyish-fuscous, ciliations in ♂ ¾. Palpi fuscous, second segment mixed with white within. Abdomen fuscous-grey. Legs, anterior pair fuscous, middle pair fuscous with tibiae and tarsi banded with whitish, posterior pair fuscous-grey. Forewings moderate, costa well arched, apex rounded, termen rounded, oblique; white, irrorated with dark fuscous; stigmata blackish; plical large, obliquely before first discal, coalescing with dark patch on dorsum; irroration tending to form blotches on costa at base, ⅓, ½ and ⅓; apical blotch sending an obscure line to tornus, where it forms a tornal blotch: fringes whitish-grey mixed with fuscous. Hindwings and fringes fuscous-grey.

This species can be confused with Trachypepla photinella.

== Distribution ==
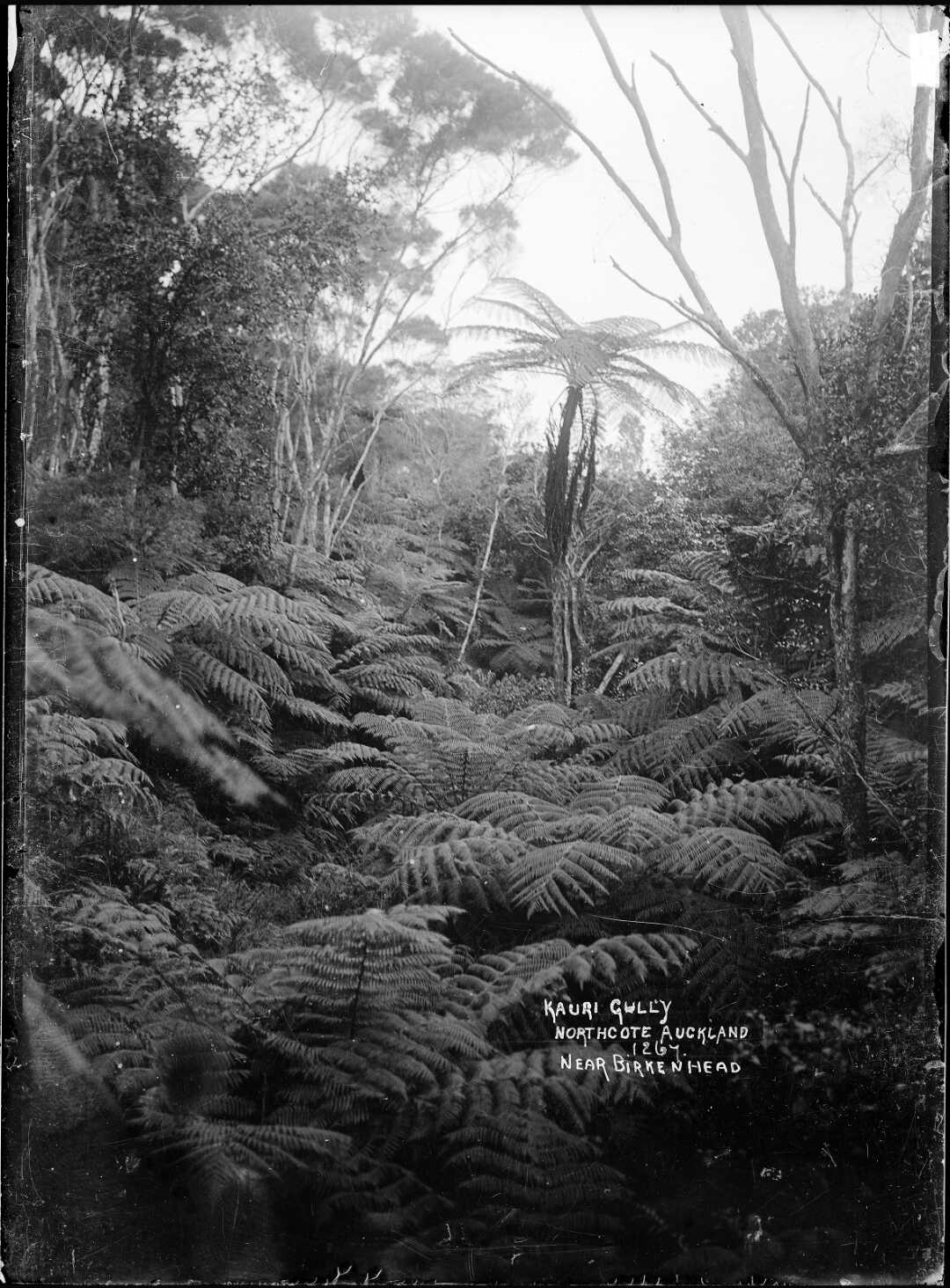
View of Kauri Gully, type locality of T. clarkei.

This species is endemic to New Zealand. Other than the type locality of Kauri Gully, this species has been collected near Mangamuka in Northland, and Albany, north of Auckland. This species has also been observed in Otago.

== Behaviour and habitat ==
This species is on the wing from November until February and inhabits open scrubland or native forest.
