= Swimming at the 2012 Summer Paralympics – Women's 400 metre freestyle S11 =

Event in the 2012 Paralympic Games

Women's 400 metre freestyle S11 at the XIV Paralympic Games
- Venue: London Aquatics Centre
- Dates: 7 September
- Competitors: 11 from 9 nations

Medalists
1st place, gold medalist(s)		Daniela Schulte	Germany
2nd place, silver medalist(s)		Amber Thomas	Canada
3rd place, bronze medalist(s)		Cecilia Camellini	Italy

The women's 400 metre freestyle S11 event at the 2012 Paralympic Games took place on 7 September, at the London Aquatics Centre.

Two heats were held, one with five swimmers, the other one with six competitors. The swimmers with the eight fastest times advanced to the final.

== Heats ==
=== Heat 1 ===
Rank	Lane	Name	Nationality	Time	Notes
1	4	Cecilia Camellini	Italy	5:25.70	Q, PR
2	5	Mary Fisher	New Zealand	5:32.31	Q, OC
3	3	Olga Iakibiuk	Ukraine	5:43.89	Q
4	2	Rina Akiyama	Japan	6:21.58	
5	6	Áine Kelly-Costello	New Zealand	6:27.02	

=== Heat 2 ===
Rank	Lane	Name	Nationality	Time	Notes
1	4	Daniela Schulte	Germany	5:11.32	Q, PR
2	5	Amber Thomas	Canada	5:14.42	Q, AM
3	3	Naomi Ikinaga	Japan	6:02.91	Q
4	6	Chantal Cavin	Switzerland	6:05.55	Q
5	2	Nadia Báez	Argentina	6:19.35	Q
6	7	Irina Lavrova	Russia	7:01.18	

== Final ==
Rank	Lane	Name	Nationality	Time	Notes
1st place, gold medalist(s)	4	Daniela Schulte	Germany	5:14.36	
2nd place, silver medalist(s)	5	Amber Thomas	Canada	5:15.48	
3rd place, bronze medalist(s)	3	Cecilia Camellini	Italy	5:20.27	
4	6	Mary Fisher	New Zealand	5:22.09	OC
5	2	Olga Iakibiuk	Ukraine	5:48.02	
6	7	Naomi Ikinaga	Japan	5:53.20	AS
7	1	Chantal Cavin	Switzerland	6:11.29	
8	8	Nadia Báez	Argentina	6:15.98	
