= Swimming at the 2016 Summer Paralympics – Women's 100 metre freestyle S11 =

Women's 100 metre freestyle S11 at the XV Paralympic Games
- Venue: Olympic Aquatics Stadium
- Dates: 15 September 2016
- Competitors: 14 from 9 nations

Medalists
| 1st place, gold medalist(s) | | Qing Xie | China |
| 2nd place, silver medalist(s) | | Guizhi Li | China |
| 3rd place, bronze medalist(s) | | Liesette Bruinsma | Netherlands |

The women's 100 metre freestyle S11 event at the 2016 Paralympic Games took place on 15 September 2016, at the Olympic Aquatics Stadium. Two heats were held. The swimmers with the eight fastest times advanced to the final.

== Heats ==
=== Heat 1 ===
10:56 15 September 2016:

| Rank | Lane | Name | Nationality | Time | Notes |
|---|---|---|---|---|---|
| 1 | 4 | Cecilia Camellini | Italy | 1:09.10 | Q |
| 2 | 3 | Qing Xie | China | 1:10.73 | Q |
| 3 | 5 | Maja Reichard | Sweden | 1:11.98 | Q |
| 4 | 6 | Letticia Martinez | United States | 1:13.86 | Q |
| 5 | 2 | Regiane Nunes Silva | Brazil | 1:15.47 | |
| 6 | 7 | Olga Iakibiuk | Ukraine | 1:18.47 | |
| 7 | 1 | Martina Rabbolini | Italy | 1:18.50 | |

=== Heat 2 ===
11:01 15 September 2016:

| Rank | Lane | Name | Nationality | Time | Notes |
|---|---|---|---|---|---|
| 1 | 4 | Liesette Bruinsma | Netherlands | 1:08.97 | Q |
| 2 | 3 | Guizhi Li | China | 1:09.22 | Q |
| 3 | 5 | Mary Fisher | New Zealand | 1:11.85 | Q |
| 4 | 6 | Maryna Piddubna | Ukraine | 1:13.00 | Q |
| 5 | 2 | Kateryna Tkachuk | Ukraine | 1:14.25 | |
| 6 | 1 | Chikako Ono | Japan | 1:16.45 | |
| 7 | 7 | Naomi Ikinaga | Japan | 1:20.85 | |

== Final ==
19:14 15 September 2016:

| Rank | Lane | Name | Nationality | Time | Notes |
|---|---|---|---|---|---|
| 1st place, gold medalist(s) | 6 | Qing Xie | China | 1:08.03 | |
| 2nd place, silver medalist(s) | 3 | Guizhi Li | China | 1:08.31 | |
| 3rd place, bronze medalist(s) | 4 | Liesette Bruinsma | Netherlands | 1:08.55 | |
| 4 | 2 | Mary Fisher | New Zealand | 1:09.47 | |
| 5 | 5 | Cecilia Camellini | Italy | 1:10.39 | |
| 6 | 7 | Maja Reichard | Sweden | 1:10.53 | |
| 7 | 1 | Maryna Piddubna | Ukraine | 1:11.55 | |
| 8 | 8 | Letticia Martinez | United States | 1:14.09 | |
