= Westfield Albany =

Coordinates: 36.728145°S 174.708871°E

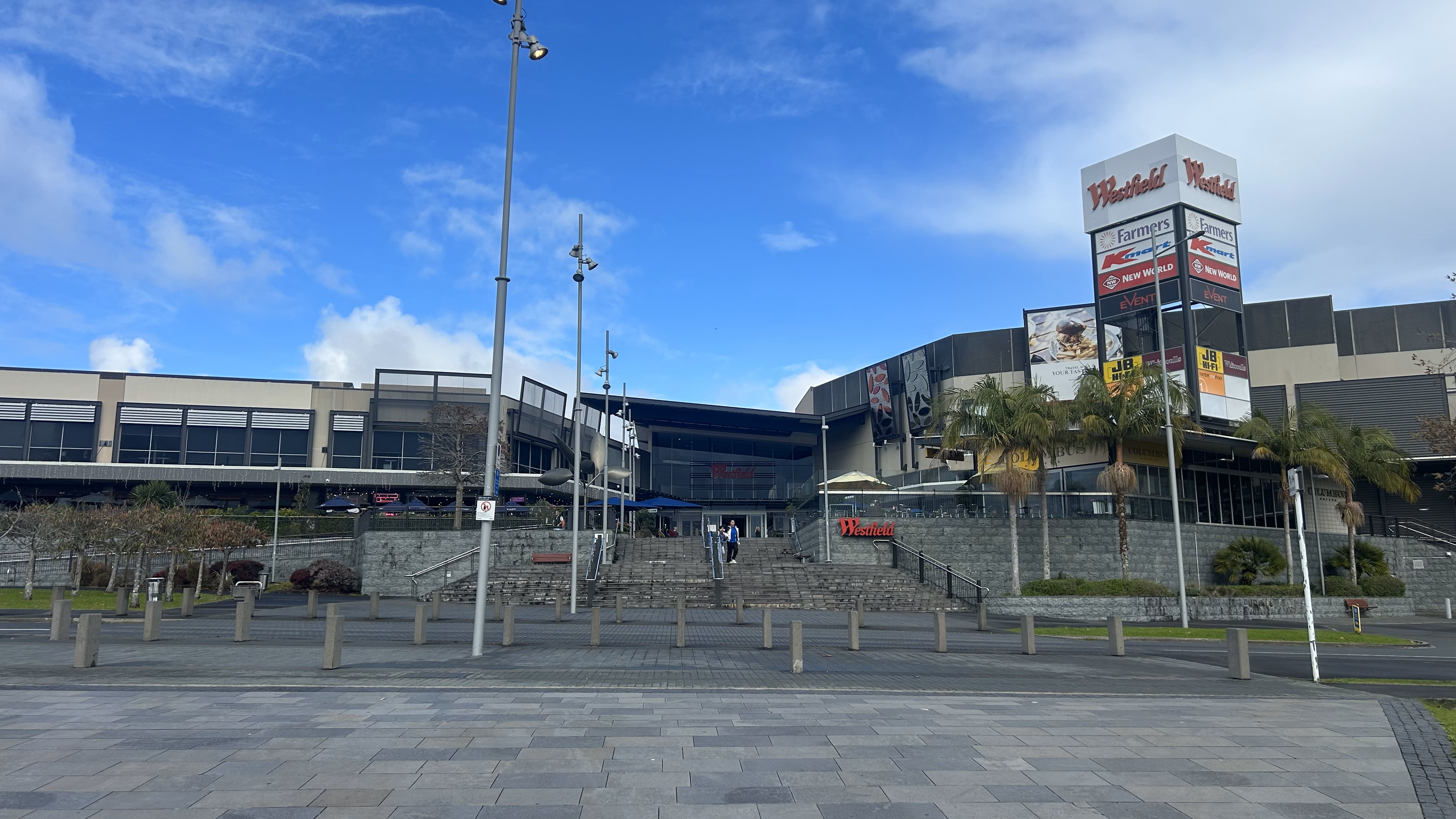
- Looking at the centre from the north
- Location: Albany, Auckland, New Zealand
- Address: 219 Don McKinnon Drive
- Opened: 30 August 2007; 19 years ago
- Developer: Westfield Group
- Owner: Scentre Group (51%); GIC (49%)
- Num. of stores: ~ 145
- Num. of anchor tenants: 4 (including cinemas)
- Floor area: 53, 329 m² (retail)
- Floors: 2
- Parking: ~2373+ spaces
- Website: www.westfield.co.nz/albany

Westfield Albany is a shopping centre in the Auckland suburb of Albany, New Zealand, opposite the Albany Lakes Civic Park. It is majority owned (51%) by Scentre Group with the remainder owned by the Singapore Government's GIC. Until 2014 it was wholly owned by Scentre Group, which was formerly part of Westfield Group.

Once the last sections opened in April 2008, at 7 ha (70,000 m^{2}) of indoor space (4.9 ha retail [49,000 m^{2}] and 2.1 ha [21,000 m^{2}] offices), and costing around NZ$210 million to construct.

Westfield Albany provides over 2,000 carparks for around 150 specialty stores, as well as a large-format 2 floor 10,000 m^{2} Farmers, a Kmart and a New World. It also contains an Event Cinemas multiplex cinema and a 560-seat food court which includes major fastfood franchises.

== History and development ==
The centre was Westfield's first totally new mall since entering the New Zealand market in the mid-90s. When first mooted in 2003, it was conceived as a much smaller centre, with 20,000 m^{2} planned initially, and with an expansion of 15,000 m^{2} proposed for a decade later if population increase in the vicinity justified it. By 2007 when the mall opened, planning of an extension was already under way.

At that time, some experts saw demand for about twice the size of the centre in retail and associated office space in the wider Albany area. However, Westfield itself had in the past put in submissions against a District Plan change in the area, contending that it allowed for "excessive retail provision in the Albany area" (in a northern 'mainstreet' area separate from the core where Westfield and a number of other retailers have their sites). The challenge was rejected by the Environment Court.

The concept of the Albany mall was considered a (somewhat reluctant) new approach by Westfield, which had previously been accused of disregarding the outside effects of its malls, and of maximising commercial opportunities at the cost of the surrounding communities. Spurred by criticism and council plans to develop a 'town centre' instead of simply providing retail areas, Westfield changed its standard greenfields-type plans for the new site, and developed a more open centre with 'main street' elements and some public areas. The change was considered a significant step away from the inward-looking shopping centres built in New Zealand in the 1990s, and North Shore City Council hoped that the centre would integrate with future growth in Albany rather than be a shopping destination alone.

== Opening ==
Westfield Albany Stage One opened on 30 August 2007, with 65 shops trading. The rest of the shops opened on 1 November 2007 after a main opening ceremony attended by Prime Minister Helen Clark and Westfield Group Managing Director Steven Lowy, while the 10-screen cinemas' opening was delayed to April 2008.

In July 2008, the cinemas of the centre were closed preventively by Skycity cinemas due to weathertightness reasons. Problems with the roof had already caused a single cinema to be shut a month earlier. The cinemas were reopened about a week later.

In May 2011, the mall was closed for inspection after sustaining damage when a tornado caused widespread damage and one fatality on Auckland's North Shore.

Annual sales for the full year 2018 were $422.8 million.

== Awards ==
In 2008, the centre received the highest award of the New Zealand Property Council, with the judges calling the centre being one of "a new generation of its type" and having a good mix of leisure and entertainment with an emphasis on public spaces, which had been "designed to provide a focal point for the whole Albany community and beyond".
