= Albany, New Zealand =

Albany
- Suburb
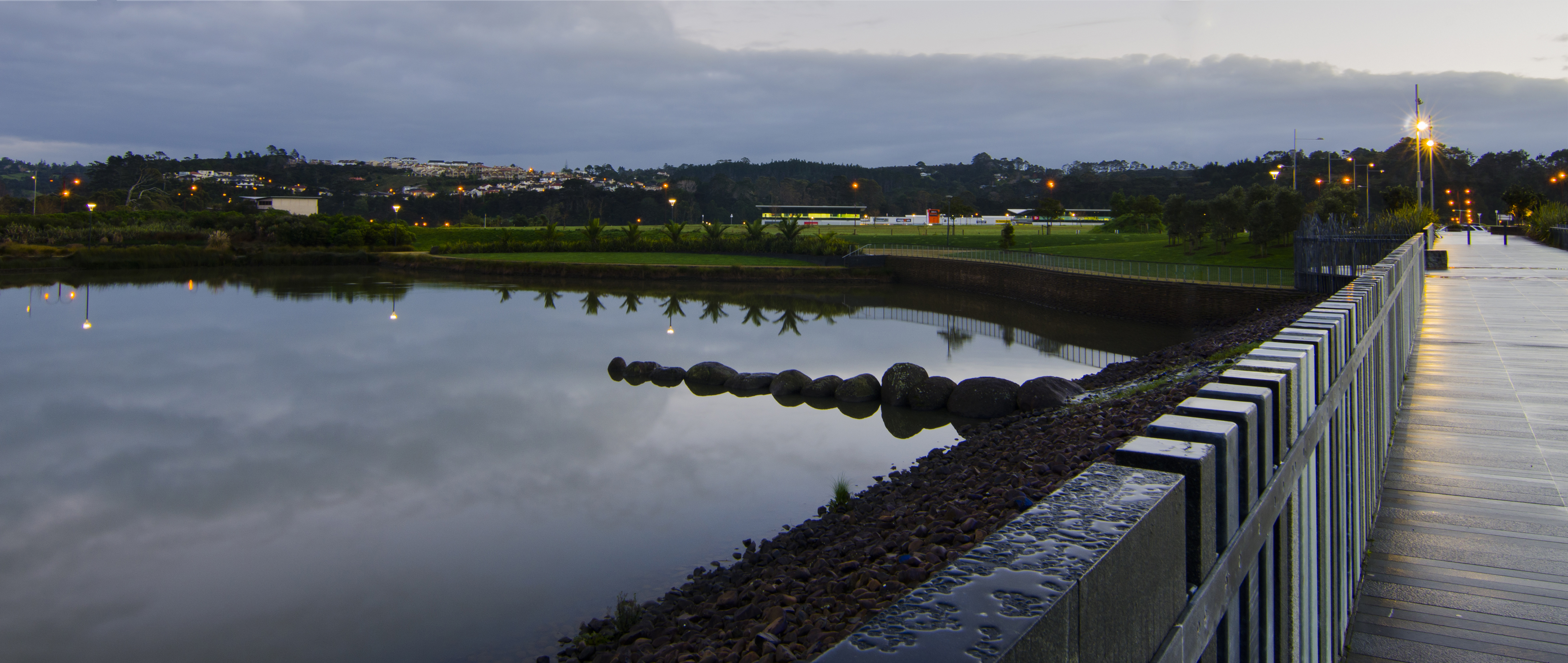
- North Harbour Stadium seen from Albany Lakes Civic Park
- Interactive map of Albany
- Coordinates: 36.727°S 174.698°E
- Country: New Zealand
- City: Auckland
- Local authority: Auckland Council
- Electoral ward: Albany ward
- Local board: Upper Harbour Local Board
- Established: 1840s

Area
  - Land: 1,067 ha (2,640 acres)

Population (June 2025)
  - Total: 12,930
  - Density: 1,212/km^{2} (3,139/sq mi)
- Postcode: 0632
- Busway stations: Albany busway station

Dairy Flat	Albany Heights	Fairview Heights
Lucas Heights	Albany	Oteha
Schnapper Rock	Rosedale	Pinehill

Albany (/ˈælbəni/ AL-bə-nee) (Māori: Ōkahukura) is one of the northernmost suburbs of the contiguous Auckland metropolitan area in New Zealand. It is located on the North Shore, 15 kilometres (9 mi) northwest of the Auckland city centre. Albany is found at the headlands of Lucas Creek, and was the location of a portage used by Tāmaki Māori, where waka could be taken between the Upper Waitematā Harbour and the Okura River/Hauraki Gulf. During the 1840s, early European settlers established the village of Lucas Creek, which by the 1880s had become a major fruit growing centre in Auckland. The town voted to change the name from Lucas Creek to Albany in 1890.

During the 1960s, large areas of farmland in Albany were requisitioned for a state housing project. The project was never built, and the land stayed vacant until the 1990s, when it was sold to private developers. Albany rapidly developed in the 1990s and 2000s, during which major projects were constructed, including Westfield Albany and North Harbour Stadium. Much of the land to the north of Albany is semi-rural.

Albany is divided into four areas: Albany, Albany Heights, Albany Village, and Albany Centre. The two former names are official.

== Etymologies ==
From the 1840s until 1890, the settlement was known as Lucas Creek, named after early pioneer Daniel Clucas, who arrived in early 1840s and established a flax mill on the upper Lucas Creek at Albany. Over time, the name Lucas Creek developed bad associations, due to the moonshine operations that operated along the waterway. In 1890, the townspeople voted to change the name from Lucas Creek to Albany, a name suggested by Captain Alexander McArthur, which was suggested due to its associations with Albany, Western Australia, then a major horticulture centre. Albany in Western Australia was named after Prince Frederick, Duke of York and Albany, second son of King George III, in 1832. The name Lucas Creek was still in popular use in the early 20th century, and for many years the name appeared hyphenated as Albany-Lucas Creek in institutions and businesses.

Three Māori language names are associated with the Albany area. Ōkahukura is the most commonly used name in modern contexts, including the North Shore Ōkahukura District Court, Albany Community Hub Te Pokapū ā-Hapori o Ōkahukura, and a Fletcher Living housing development in Albany. Originally a name for the Lucas Creek estuary, the name refers to the Ngāti Manuhiri tūpuna (ancestress) Te Kura, the wife of Mataahu, who was the uncle to Manuhiri, the eponymous ancestor of the iwi. The word kahukura in Māori usually refers to rainbows or butterflies. Additionally, Lucas Creek is also referred to as Kaipātiki ("Stream for Eating Flounder"). Another common name for the Albany area is Ōteha ("Of Te Ha"), referring to Ngāti Manuhiri ancestor Te Ha Kaiaraara, grandson of Manuhiri. Ōteha was the name of a kāinga in the Ōteha Valley.

== Geography ==
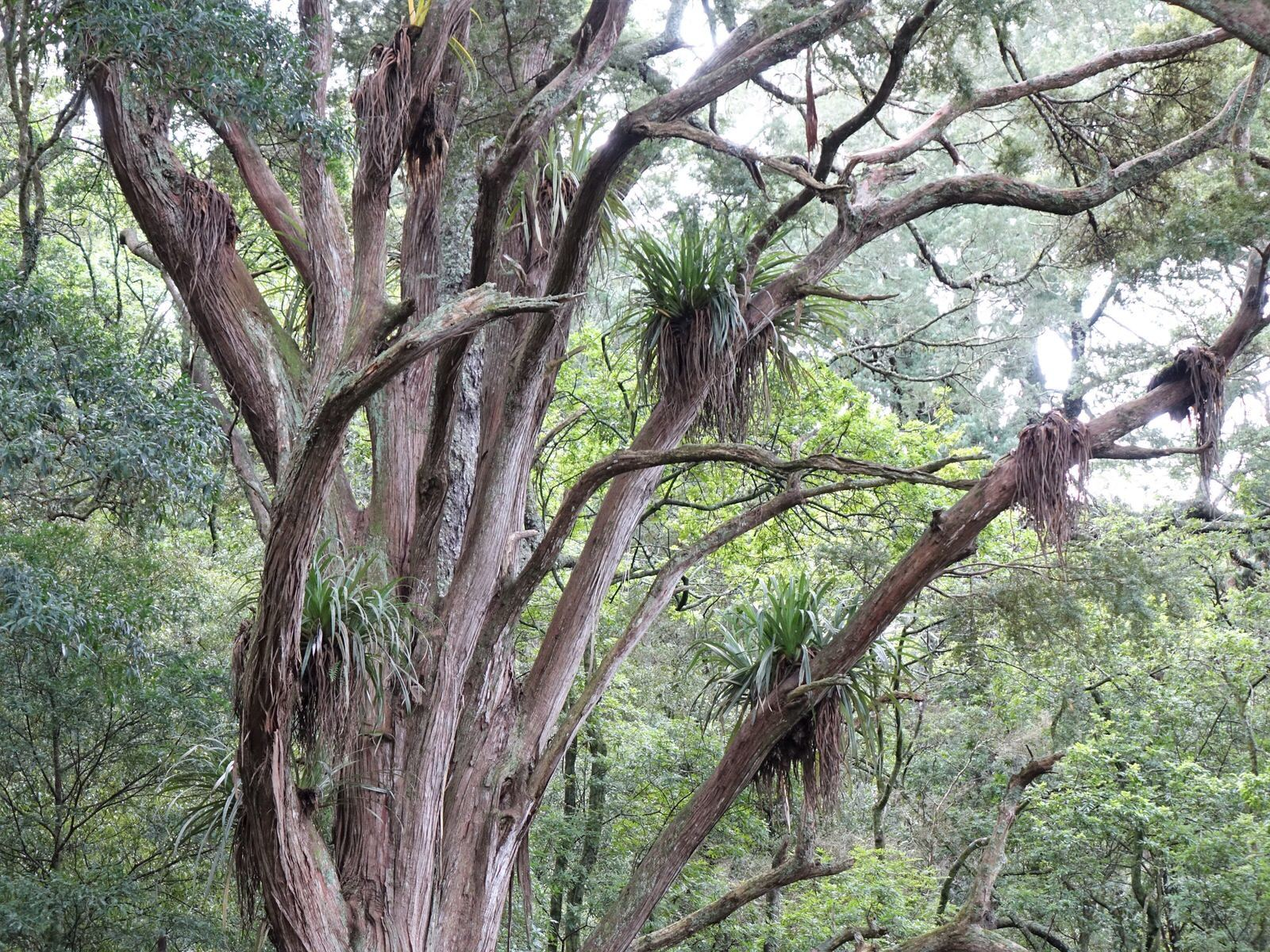
Some remnant tōtara trees at Fernhill Escarpment in Albany are estimated to be 800 years old

Albany is a suburb of the North Shore of New Zealand. It is located in the upper reaches of the Lucas Creek, an estuarial arm of the Upper Waitematā Harbour, and in the Ōteha Valley. The Oteha Stream is a tributary of Lucas Creek that flows through southern Albany, which in turn has a tributary, Alexandra Stream, which flows north through Rosedale and joins the Oteha Stream at Albany. Albany is bordered the Auckland Northern Motorway to the east and Rosedale Road in the south.

Much of the Albany area is formed from Early Miocene Waitemata Group sandstone and mudstone, with areas of conglomerate rock called Albany Conglomerate. The banks of the Lucas Creek were historically kauri-dominated forests. By the mid-19th century, the area had developed into a mānuka and fern-dominated scrubland. Some forest remnants can be found around Albany, such as the Fernhill Escarpment, which includes tōtara trees estimated to be 800 years old.

=== Climate ===
Climate data for Albany (1991–2020)
Month	Jan	Feb	Mar	Apr	May	Jun	Jul	Aug	Sep	Oct	Nov	Dec	Year
Mean daily maximum °C (°F)	23.3 (73.9)	23.8 (74.8)	22.4 (72.3)	20.2 (68.4)	17.9 (64.2)	15.5 (59.9)	14.5 (58.1)	15.1 (59.2)	16.3 (61.3)	17.7 (63.9)	19.4 (66.9)	21.3 (70.3)	19.0 (66.1)
Daily mean °C (°F)	19.1 (66.4)	19.8 (67.6)	18.2 (64.8)	16.0 (60.8)	13.8 (56.8)	11.8 (53.2)	10.6 (51.1)	11.2 (52.2)	12.6 (54.7)	13.8 (56.8)	15.4 (59.7)	17.4 (63.3)	15.0 (59.0)
Mean daily minimum °C (°F)	15.0 (59.0)	15.7 (60.3)	14.0 (57.2)	11.8 (53.2)	9.8 (49.6)	8.0 (46.4)	6.6 (43.9)	7.2 (45.0)	8.8 (47.8)	9.9 (49.8)	11.3 (52.3)	13.5 (56.3)	11.0 (51.7)
Average rainfall mm (inches)	67.0 (2.64)	65.4 (2.57)	87.5 (3.44)	92.6 (3.65)	118.0 (4.65)	134.0 (5.28)	145.4 (5.72)	125.9 (4.96)	106.4 (4.19)	88.8 (3.50)	70.9 (2.79)	87.5 (3.44)	1,189.4 (46.83)
Mean monthly sunshine hours	268.6	229.1	217.9	180.5	156.7	127.8	148.3	151.7	174.3	208.0	233.6	248.7	2,345.2
Source: NIWA

== History ==
=== Māori history ===
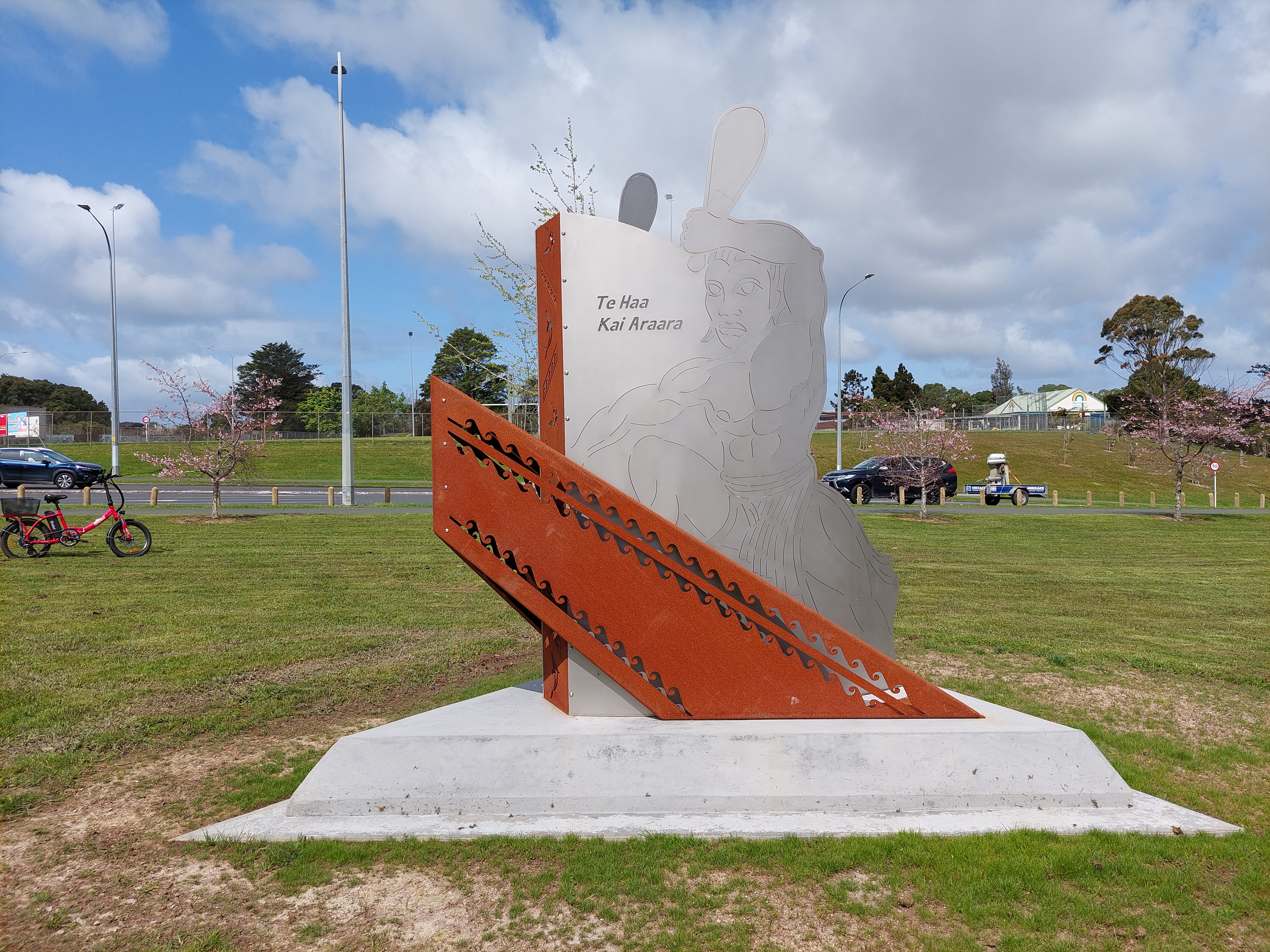
Monument to Te Ha Kaiaraara near Albany Hall.

Māori settlement of the Auckland Region began around the 13th or 14th centuries. The North Shore was settled by Tāmaki Māori, including people descended from the Tainui migratory canoe and ancestors of figures such as Taikehu and Peretū. Many of the early Tāmaki Māori people of the North Shore identified as Ngā Oho, and the Lucas Creek has significance to modern iwi including Ngāti Manuhiri, Te Kawerau ā Maki and Ngāti Whātua o Kaipara. The poor clay soils of the area were not suitable for Māori traditional gardening techniques, but the creek was a good source for eels, crayfish and flounder.

An ara (traditional path) connected Lucas Creek and the Ōkura River to the north, which led to Long Bay and the upper Hauraki Gulf. This was used as a portage, where waka could be hauled overland between the two bodies of water, Numerous archaeological sites are found on the banks of the Lucas Creek and the Ōteha valley, because of its importance as a transportation node, which follows the ridge line of Lonely Track Road. The upper Lucas Creek area was the location of several kāinga, of which one had the name Ōteha ("Of Te Ha"), referring to Ngāti Manuhiri ancestor Te Ha Kaiaraara, grandson of Manuhiri.

The warrior Maki migrated from the Kāwhia Harbour to his ancestral home in the Auckland Region, likely sometime in the 17th century. Maki conquered and unified many the Tāmaki Māori tribes as Te Kawerau ā Maki, including those of the North Shore. After Maki's death, his sons settled different areas of his lands, creating new hapū. His younger son Maraeariki settled the North Shore and Hibiscus Coast, who based himself at the head of the Ōrewa River. Maraeariki's daughter Kahu succeeded him, and she is the namesake of the North Shore, Te Whenua Roa o Kahu ("The Greater Lands of Kahu"), Many of the iwi of the North Shore, including Ngāti Manuhiri, Ngāti Maraeariki, Ngāti Kahu, Ngāti Poataniwha, Ngāi Tai ki Tāmaki and Ngāti Whātua, can trace their lineage to Kahu.

By the first half of the 19th century, the mouth of the Lucas Creek to the southwest of Albany was one of the most densely settled areas of the North Shore by Tāmaki Māori peoples. During the early 1820s, most Māori of the North Shore fled for the Waikato or Northland due to the threat of war parties during the Musket Wars. When Tāmaki Māori returned in greater numbers to the Auckland Region in the mid-1830s, Te Kawerau ā Maki focused settlement at Te Henga / Bethells Beach.

=== Early European settlement: kauri logging and gum digging ===
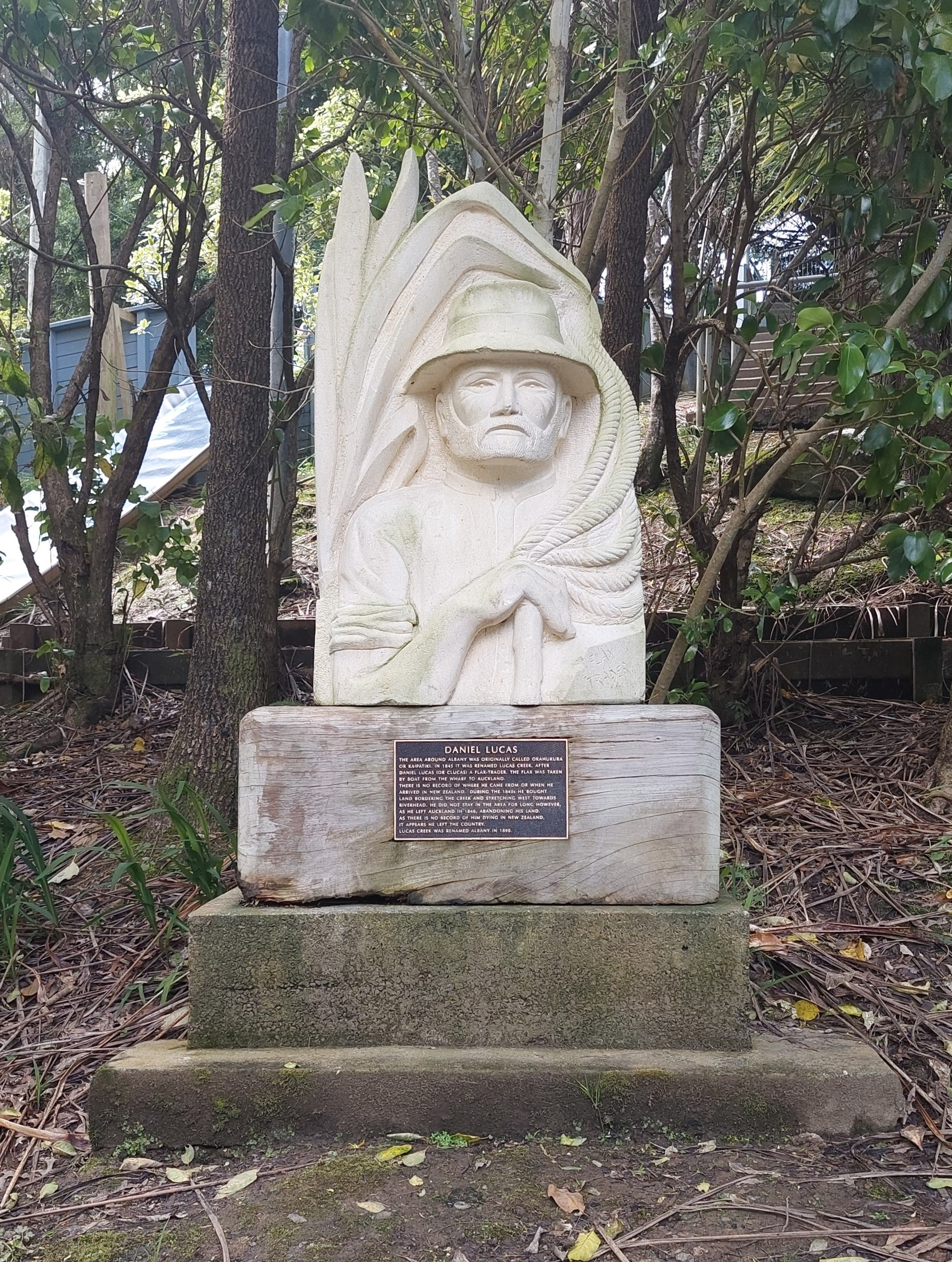
Statue of Daniel Clucas at Kell Park in Albany

The Albany area was a part of the Mahurangi Block, which was purchased by the New Zealand Government in 1841. While kauri logging was one of the first industries in the area, the supply of kauri was exhausted by the early 1840s. By the late 1840s, kauri gum digging had become a more prominent industry for the Lucas Creek area. Itinerant gum diggers would scour the area for kauri resin to sell at stores, including one located at Schnapper Rock. The first permanent resident in modern-day Albany was William Webster. Daniel Clucas arrived early 1840s, setting up a flax mill at Lucas Creek. While Lucas Creek is names after Clucas, he had left the Auckland area by 1846. Gradually a small settlement developed at the Lucas Creek headwaters; in 1844 three permanent residents lived here, which had increased to 24 by 1857.

Lucas Creek township was the local commercial centre for the upper west North Shore, due to the Lucas Creek wharf acting as the main link to the outside world. Ferries took goods and passengers along the Lucas Creek, which connected the village and surrounding areas to Auckland, and a rough overland track connected Lucas Creek township to Birkenhead and Northcote. By the 1860s a church, hotel, school and post office had opened in the village. Most early residents of Lucas Creek came from Great Britain and Ireland, with a small number arriving from Norway in the 1870s.

Albany School, which first began operating in 1865 out of a building called Bruce's Shed, had a permanent school build built in 1876. By the 1880s, the school building had become a community hub for events attended by members of the surrounding communities, such as social dances and phrenology lectures, much to the objection of the Board of Education, who disapproved of the school being used for entertainment purposes.

=== Fruit growing and rural Albany ===
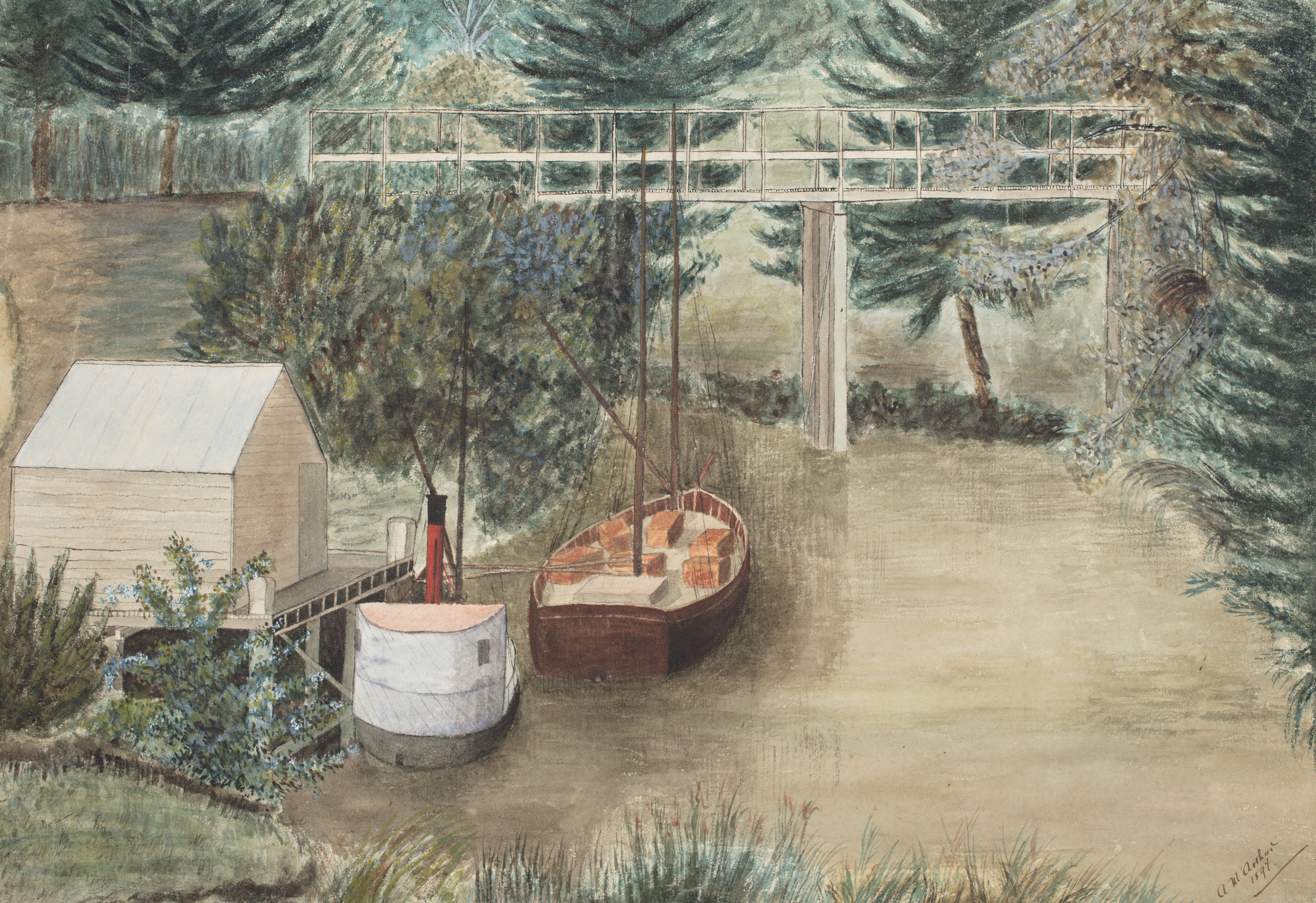
A painting of the Lucas Creek wharf and Albany Bridge by Alice McArthur (1897)

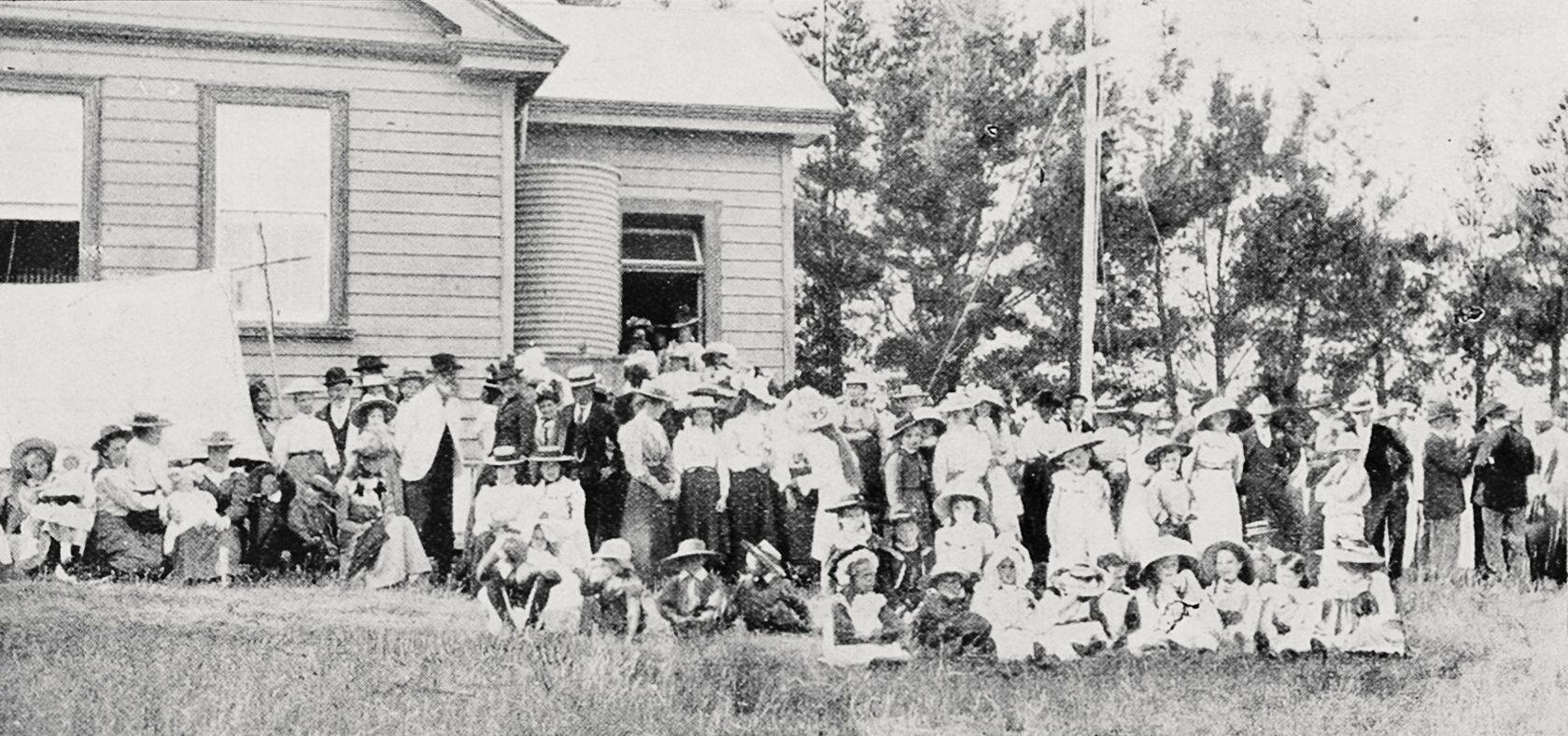
The Albany Fruitgrowers Annual Show in 1902

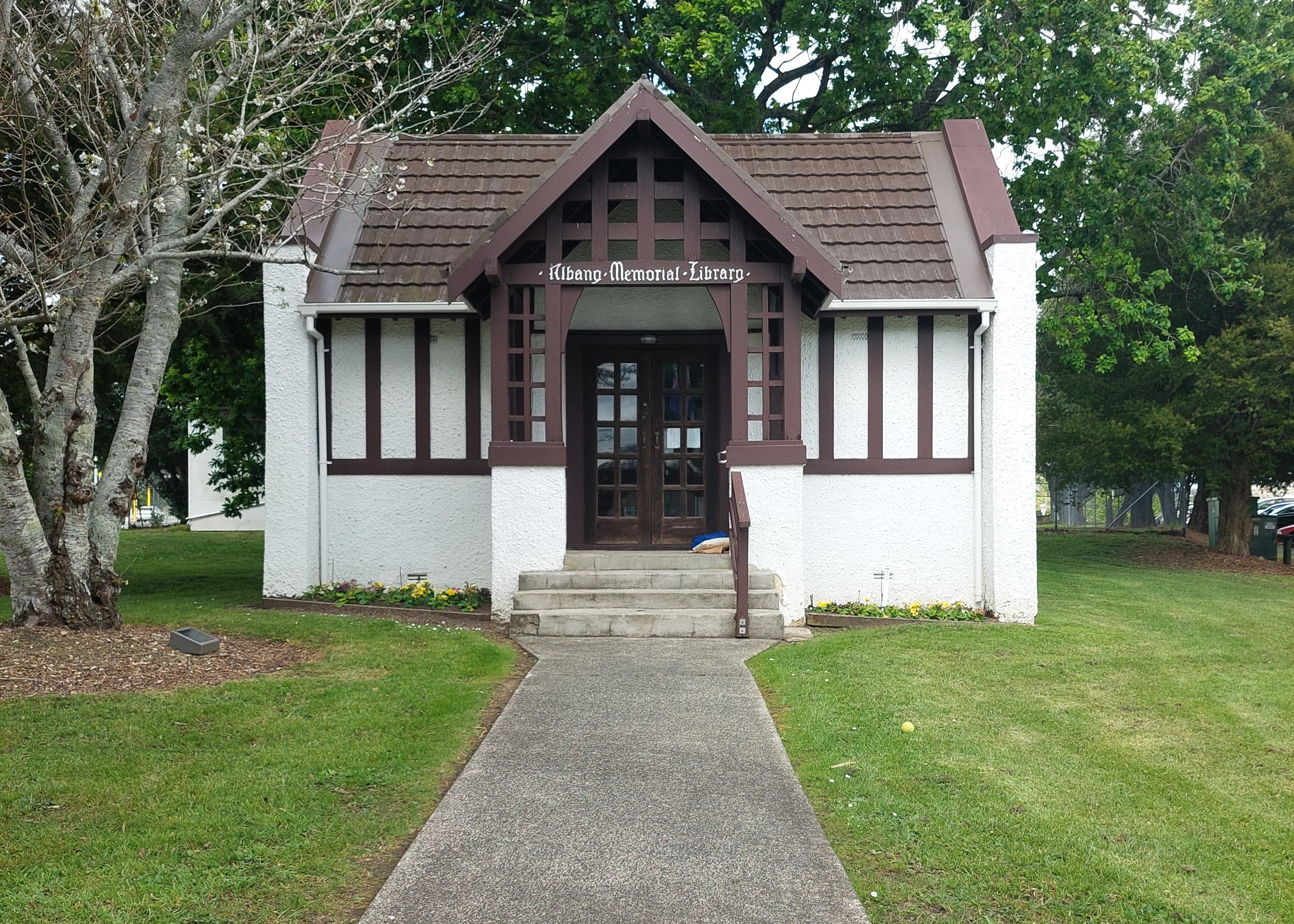
Albany War Memorial Library

While the first orchards were established at Albany in the 1850s, fruit growing only became a major industry for the village in the 1880s, after gum digging and flax processing industries became less prominent. Fruit crops were varied, and included peaches, apples, pears, plums, loquats, cherries, quince and almonds.

On 1 December 1890, the township of Lucas Creek officially changed its name to Albany. The name Lucas Creek had developed an unsavory reputation during the 19th century, associated with rough living, and illicit moonshine breweries located along the creek. The name Albany was suggested by Captain Alexander McArthur, referencing Albany, Western Australia, then a major horticulture centre, as McArthur saw similarities between the two areas.

By the 1890s, Albany had become the leading fruit growing area in Auckland. 30,000 to 50,000 cases of apples and pears were being produced each year, with many being exported to Australia. The Albany Fruitgrowers Association formed in 1893, and became a major influencing force in the township, including the establishment of a new post office, and lobbying for road widening projects. 1894 saw the first Fruit & Flower Show, an important local event which grew into the Albany A&P Show. In 1895, Albany resident George Pannill created the Albany Surprise, a variety of grape based on the American isabella. The variety was a success, becoming the most commonly eaten table grape in New Zealand in the early 20th century. The success of the Albany Surprise was followed by the Albany Beauty apple, created by Mark Phillips on Gills Road, at the turn of the century after discovering the variety growing on what was meant to be a Gravenstein apple tree. In addition to these popular crops, large blackberry and strawberry farms became a major fixture of rural Albany by the early 1900s.

Albany fell under the jurisdiction of the Waitemata County, a vast local government area covering West Auckland, Rodney and the North Shore. Residents strongly objected to the actions of the county council, feeling ignored and frustrated at the lack of roading infrastructure in Albany. The first metalled road to Albany was constructed in 1890.

In 1911, the George V Coronation Hall was opened as a local community centre, and operated as a venue for the annual Albany Agricultural Show. This was joined in 1922 with the Albany War Memorial Library, constructed to remember the fallen World War I soldiers of Albany and surrounding areas.

By 1915, North Shore roads had improved enough that regular vehicle traffic began. Over the next 15 years, river traffic decreased, and in 1930 the Kaipatiki ferry ceased operation, and the historic Albany wharf, known as the Landing, was demolished soon after. In the 1930s, dairy farms began replacing Albany's orchards and strawberry farms.

=== Suburbanisation ===
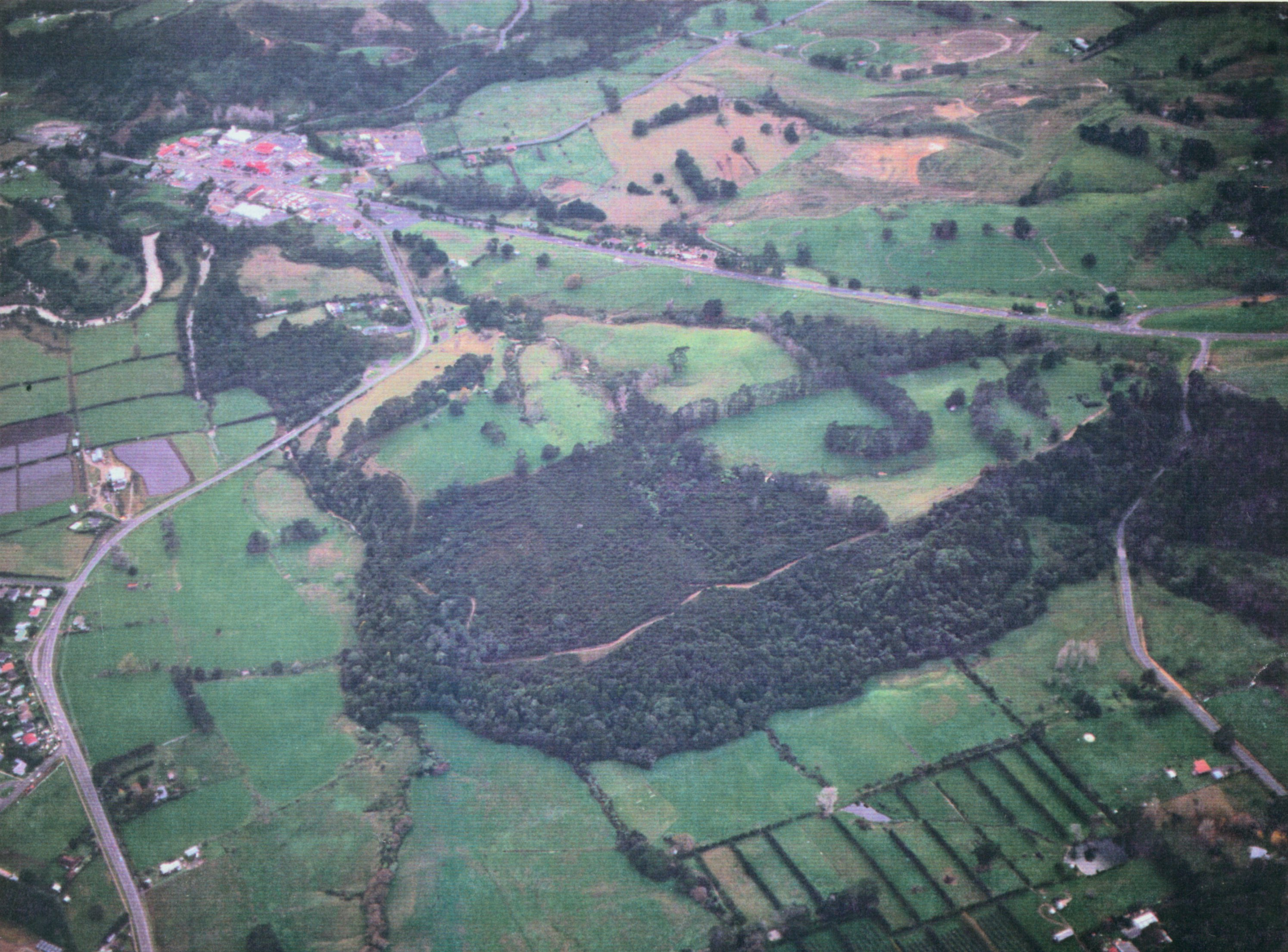
The future Massey University Albany Campus, pictured in 1989 when the area was still farmland

Albany saw a population influx post World War II, including many British and Dutch migrants to New Zealand. Many new residents in Albany sought out the area in order to live on semi-rural lifestyle blocks close to Auckland. New shops began opening in the township, including the two-storey Hillinds Building, and the Albany Pony Club began operating in 1954.

In 1959, the Auckland Harbour Bridge opened, leading to widescale development across the North Shore. Compared to surrounding areas, most notably the East Coast Bays, growth was much slower in Albany. After the construction of the bridge, the Auckland Northern Motorway was gradually opened, leading to Albany being much more closely connected to Auckland City. During this period, the North Shore Golf Club was established in Albany, after the Municipal Golf Course had been removed during motorway construction.

In 1963, the Second National Government of New Zealand requisitioned 1,500 acres (610 ha) of Albany under the Public Works Act, in order to construct state housing. Earthworks were carried out and topsoil removed, but in 1969 work stopped, and plans for the state housing area were abandoned. The former farmland was left idle and unused for the next 20 years, until the establishment of North Shore City. In 1974, after Albany had become a rural area of Takapuna City, Labour Minister of Works Hugh Watt announced further land in Albany would be requisitioned for housing projects, which Albany residents strongly objected to.

The 1970s saw significant businesses and organisations come to Albany. Allan Clarks Motors was founded 1974 and became the largest private car dealership in New Zealand in the 1980s and 1990s. In the same year, Graeme Platt established the first commercial native plant nursery in New Zealand. Many of his plants were local to the Albany area, including the tōtara cultivar Aurea, also known by the name Albany Gold. In 1978, the private school Kristin School moved its campus from Campbells Bay to Albany.

Centrepoint was established as a commune in 1977, and at its peak had over 200 residents. In the 1990s, commune leaders including founder Bert Potter were charged on child sexual abuse and drug charges. The commune was shut down in 2000.

=== Intense development ===
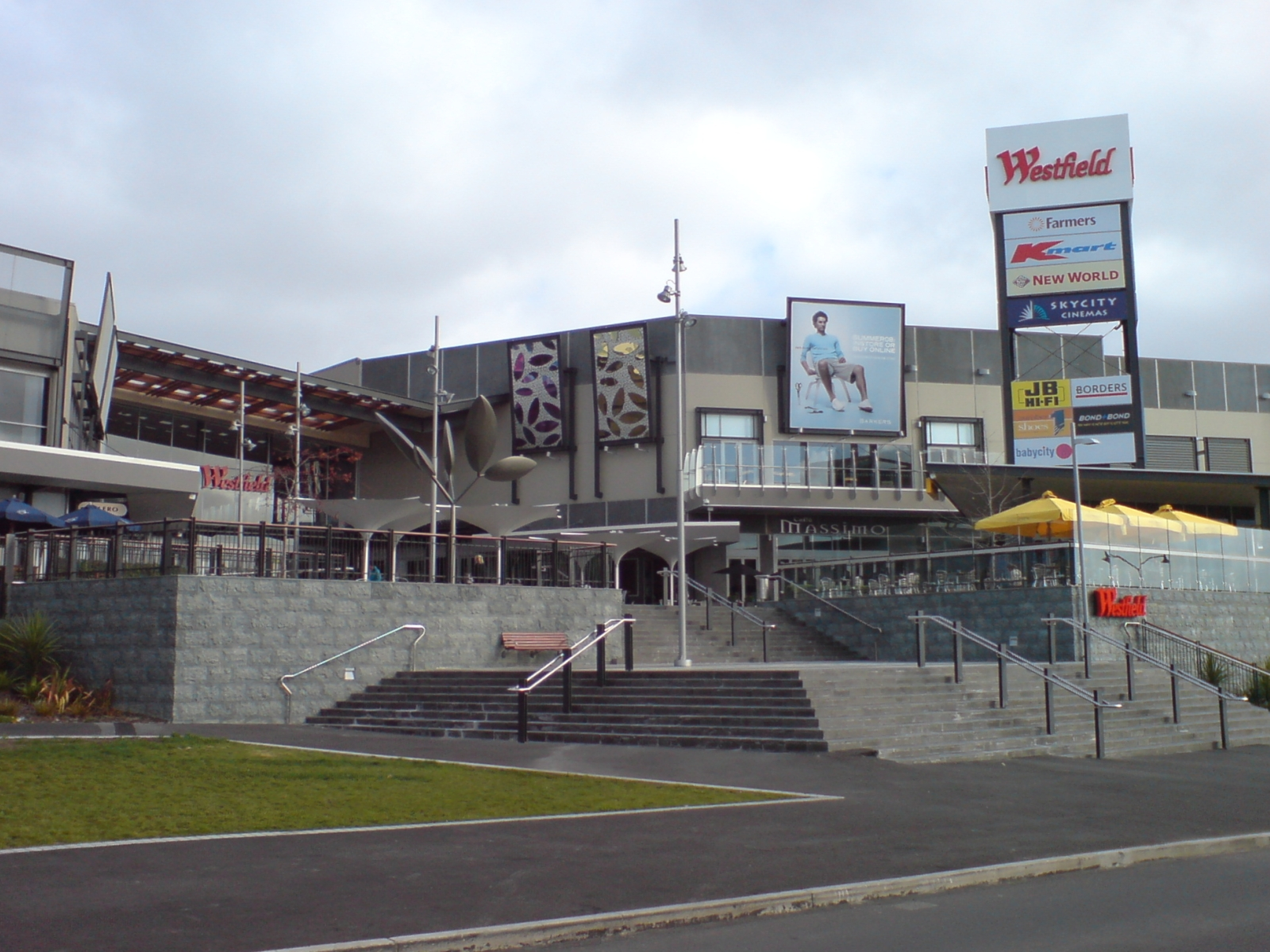
Westfield Albany in 2008

Albany became the fastest developing area of the North Shore in the 1990s. Strawberry and dairy farms were redeveloped into lifestyle blocks and intensive housing, beginning in the late 1980s, and in 1994 the Albany Fruitgrowers Association disbanded, after operating for 100 years. In 1993, the North Shore City Council unveiled a 20 year plan for developing Albany, which included the New Zealand Housing Corporation selling the land requisitioned under the Public Works Act in the 1960s to private developers. Albany's population increased from 9,000 in 1991 to 14,000 in 1998.

In March 1993, Massey University's Albany Campus was opened, and 1997 saw the construction of both the North Harbour Stadium and the Albany Shopping Centre (now known as Westfield Albany). Further intensive developments were announced in 2005, and the Albany Shopping Centre was greatly expanded by 2007 to cover 53,326 square metres (574,000 sq ft), including over 140 retailers including Farmers, Kmart, New World and JB Hi-Fi. Development in Albany slowed with the 2008 financial crisis.

In 2007, the Upper Harbour Motorway was opened, creating a motorway connection between West Auckland and the North Shore via Greenhithe. In 2008, the Northern Busway was opened along the Northern Motorway, which included the Albany busway station.

== Local government ==
From 1876 until 1954, the area was administered by the Waitemata County, a large rural county north and west of the city of Auckland. On 1 August 1974, the Waitemata County was dissolved, and Albany became a rural area incorporated into Takapuna City. In 1989, Albany was merged into the North Shore City. North Shore City was amalgamated into Auckland Council in November 2010.

Within the Auckland Council, Albany is a part of the Upper Harbour local government area governed by the Upper Harbour Local Board. It is a part of the Albany ward, which elects two councillors to the Auckland Council.

== Demographics ==
Albany covers 10.67 km^{2} (4.12 sq mi) and had an estimated population of 12,930 as of June 2025, with a population density of 1,212 people per km^{2}.

Historical population
Year	Pop.	±% p.a.
2006	7,245	—
2013	8,346	+2.04%
2018	9,981	+3.64%
2023	11,961	+3.69%
The 2006 population is for a smaller area of 9.86 km^{2}. Source:

Albany had a population of 11,961 in the 2023 New Zealand census, an increase of 1,980 people (19.8%) since the 2018 census, and an increase of 3,615 people (43.3%) since the 2013 census. There were 5,835 males, 6,081 females and 48 people of other genders in 4,215 dwellings. 3.7% of people identified as LGBTIQ+. There were 1,932 people (16.2%) aged under 15 years, 2,631 (22.0%) aged 15 to 29, 5,691 (47.6%) aged 30 to 64, and 1,713 (14.3%) aged 65 or older.

People could identify as more than one ethnicity. The results were 43.2% European (Pākehā); 4.8% Māori; 2.1% Pasifika; 51.1% Asian; 4.0% Middle Eastern, Latin American and African New Zealanders (MELAA); and 2.0% other, which includes people giving their ethnicity as "New Zealander". English was spoken by 89.8%, Māori language by 0.9%, Samoan by 0.3%, and other languages by 45.5%. No language could be spoken by 2.0% (e.g. too young to talk). New Zealand Sign Language was known by 0.2%. The percentage of people born overseas was 62.0, compared with 28.8% nationally.

Religious affiliations were 29.6% Christian, 2.9% Hindu, 2.5% Islam, 0.3% Māori religious beliefs, 2.8% Buddhist, 0.3% New Age, 0.2% Jewish, and 1.2% other religions. People who answered that they had no religion were 54.4%, and 6.1% of people did not answer the census question.

Of those at least 15 years old, 3,117 (31.1%) people had a bachelor's or higher degree, 3,774 (37.6%) had a post-high school certificate or diploma, and 2,385 (23.8%) people exclusively held high school qualifications. 1,335 people (13.3%) earned over $100,000 compared to 12.1% nationally. The employment status of those at least 15 was that 5,133 (51.2%) people were employed full-time, 1,170 (11.7%) were part-time, and 285 (2.8%) were unemployed.

Individual statistical areas
Name	Area (km^{2})	Population	Density (per km^{2})	Dwellings	Median age	Median income
Albany Heights	3.92	4,194	1,070	1,374	34.4 years	$51,600
Albany Central	3.21	1,593	486	723	32.0 years	$37,500
Albany West	2.06	2,799	1,359	939	41.6 years	$34,600
Albany South	1.48	3,375	2,280	1,179	39.7 years	$41,100
New Zealand					38.1 years	$41,500

== Parks ==
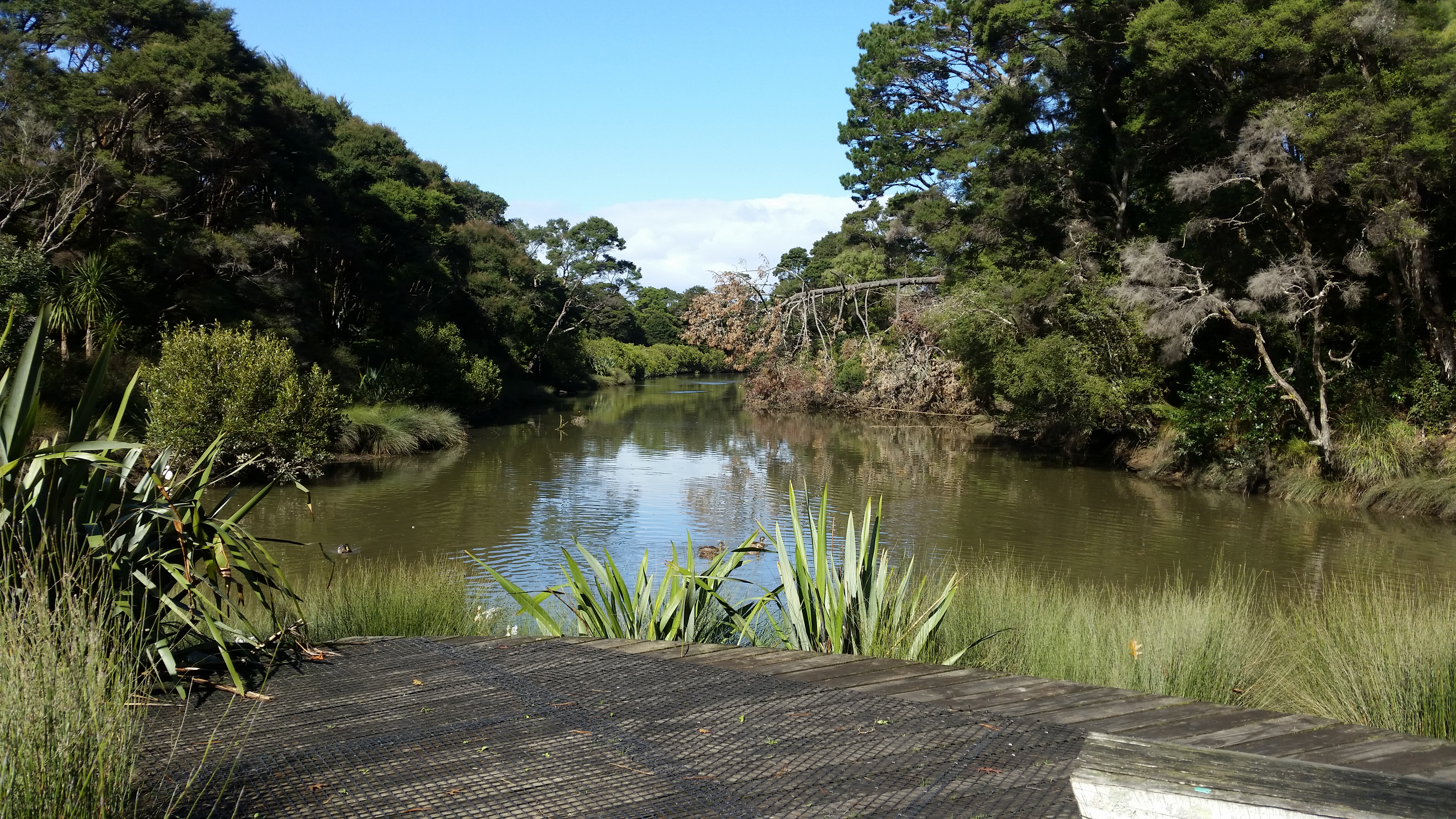
View of Lucas Creek in Kell Park, Albany

The North Shore City council expanded Albany's parkland; in 2007, it paid $3 million for new land totalling 7,000 square metres (75,347 sq ft). Kell Park reserve next to the new Albany Village Library was known for its free-range bantam chicken population, and pirate ship flying fox playground. The bantams have led to bantam-themed logos and a rooster statue in Albany. By 2008, the free-roaming chicken population had been removed.

The Fernhill Escarpment is a large nature reserve in Albany, on the north-east bank of the Oteha Stream. Large tōtara trees can be found here, with some estimated to be 800 years old. Adjacent to the Fernhill Escarpment is a forested area owned by Massey University. This was formerly home to the Royal Albany Trail, a private cycle trail in use by the public from 2004 until 2018, when it was closed by the university.

== Transport ==
The Albany busway station connecting to the Northern Busway was opened in 2005.

== Education ==
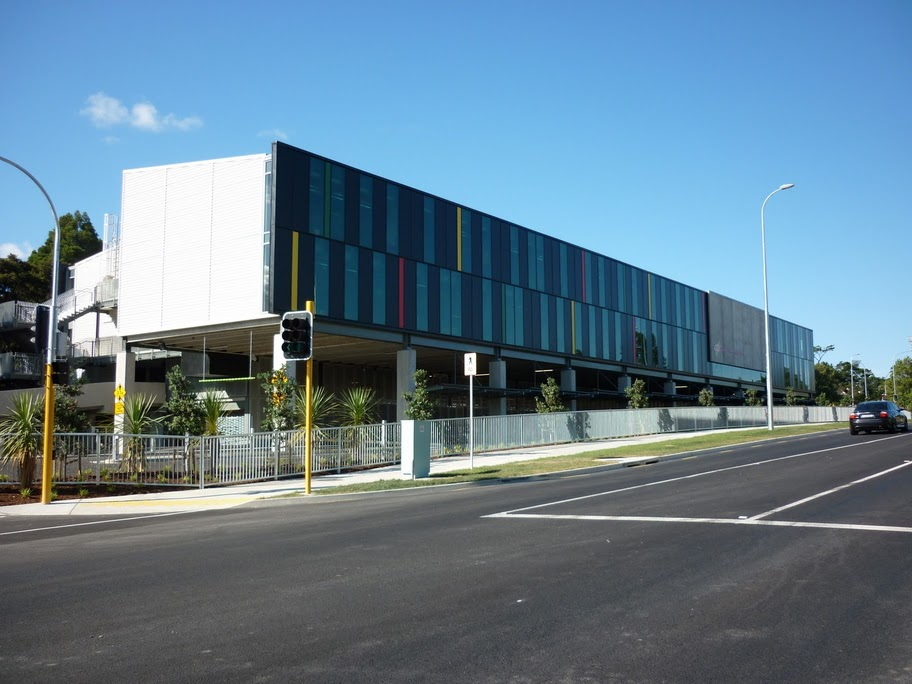
Exterior of Albany Senior High School in 2010

Albany Primary School is a contributing primary (years 1–6) school with a roll of 642.

Kristin School is an independent composite school offering the International Baccalaureate. It has a roll of 1,743 July 2026.

Pinehurst School is a private composite (years 1–13) school offering the Cambridge Assessment Examination with a roll of 1,145.

Albany Junior High School at Rosedale was opened in 2005, and has a roll of 1,128.

Albany Senior High School opened in 2009 for year 11–13 students. Due to delays in completing the Senior campus, the Senior High School initially shared the Albany Junior High School site. There was controversy about cost overruns when Albany Senior High school was under construction in 2008. The new building opened in 2009 to serve 1400 students. It has a roll of 765.

All schools are coeducational. The rolls are as of July 2026.

Albany contains the northern campus of Massey University. It offers 70 majors plus specialised programmes including Mathematics and Information Sciences, Fundamental Sciences, Food Technology, Engineering, Design, Jazz, Social Sciences, Business, Philosophy and Education. The school has three areas: East Precinct off State Highway 17; Oteha Rohe, off the Albany Highway; Albany Village Precinct off Kell Drive and State Highway 17, where the Schools of Engineering, Design and Psychology are. It has a campus shuttle bus between the three campuses leaving every 40 to 45 minutes. There are bus routes to Albany.

The former Centrepoint commune was converted into a research centre for natural medicine, offering courses in aromatherapy, nutrition, naturopathy, herbalism, yoga and ayurvedic medicine.

== Bibliography ==
- Harris, Alison; Stevenson, Robert (2002). Once There Were Green Fields: the Story of Albany, New Zealand. Albany: A. Harris and R. Stevenson. ISBN 0-473-08160-1. OCLC 62526122. Wikidata Q123424599.
- King, Ray (1984), Tauhinu: a History of Greenhithe, OCLC 37242212, Wikidata Q123416976
- Taua, Te Warena (2009). "He Kohikohinga Kōrero mō Hikurangi". In Macdonald, Finlay; Kerr, Ruth (eds.). West: The History of Waitakere. Random House. pp. 23–48. ISBN 9781869790080.
- Verran, David (2010), The North Shore: An Illustrated History, North Shore: Random House, OL 33434370W, Wikidata Q120520385
