= Albany Lakes Civic Park =

Public park in Auckland, New Zealand

Albany Lakes Reserve
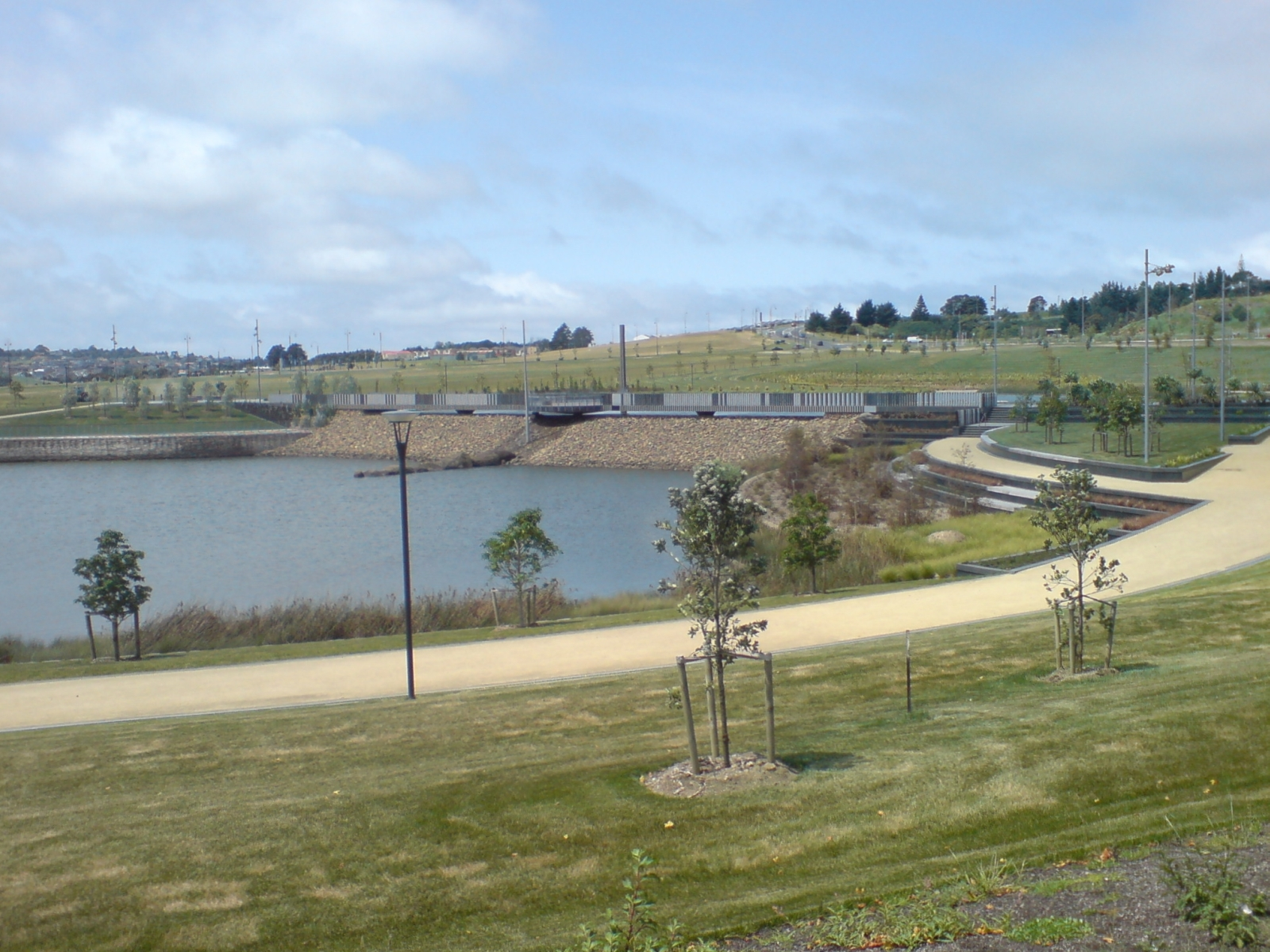
- Looking northeast over the lower lake, with the weir/bridge separating it from the higher eastern lake.
- Interactive map of Albany Lakes Reserve
- Type: Urban park
- Location: 4 Civic Crescent, Albany, Auckland
- Coordinates: 36.7264°S 174.7088°E
- Opened: 5 November 2009
- Website: Auckland Council

Albany Lakes Reserve is a public park located in Albany, New Zealand, a suburb of Auckland. It is adjacent to the Westfield Albany shopping mall, in the centre of the commercial area.

The park comprises two artificial lakes that serve both as landscape features and stormwater ponds. There are paved pathways around each lake with a boardwalk in between the lakes, and art installations along the boardwalk. The lakes were created in the late 2000s, and the park itself was officially opened on 5 November 2009.

Providing an assembly/grassland area allowing up to 10,000 people to the north of the lakes, the park was designated as one of the 'fan zones' for the Rugby World Cup 2011.
