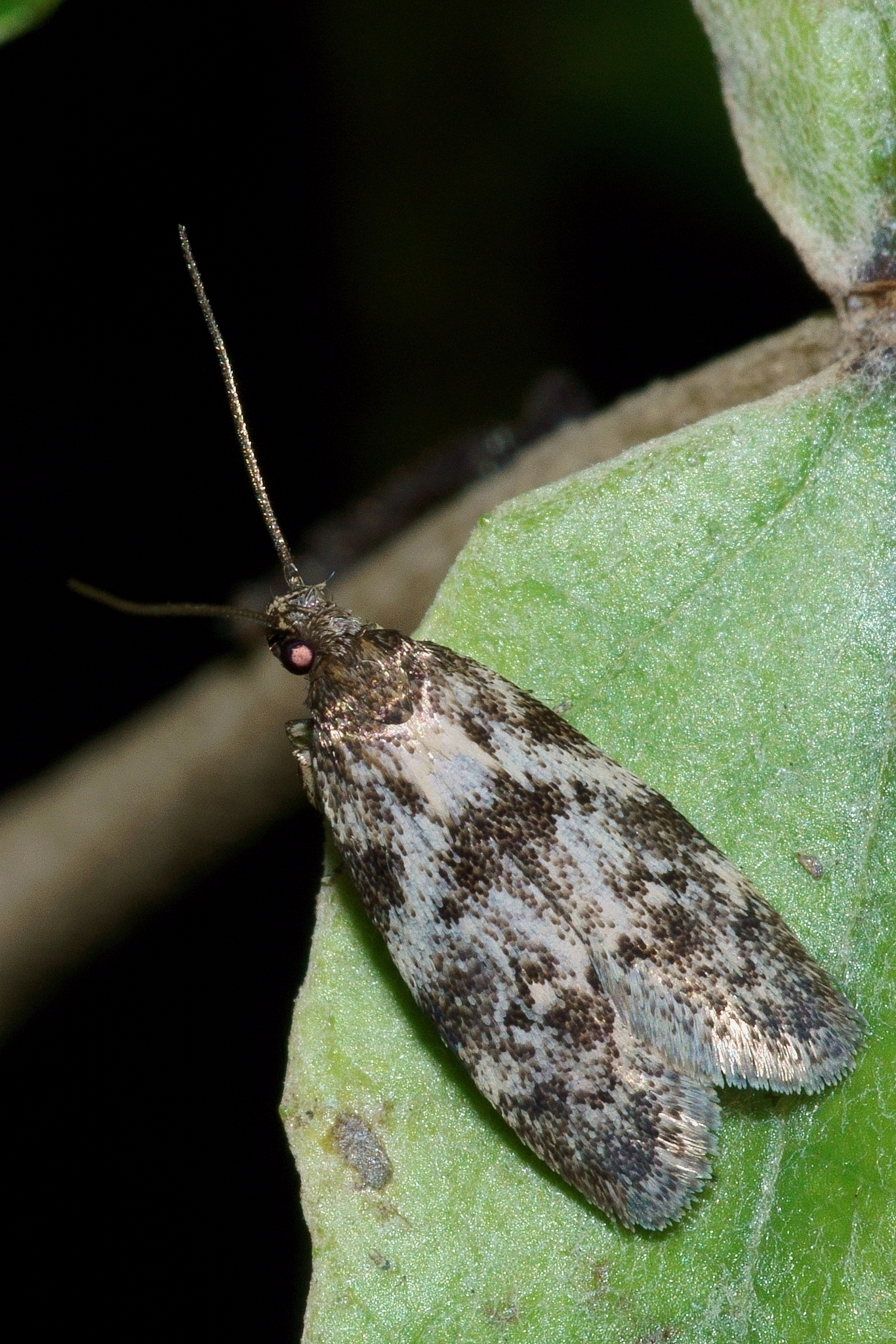

Scientific classification
- Kingdom: Animalia
- Phylum: Arthropoda
- Class: Insecta
- Order: Lepidoptera
- Family: Oecophoridae
- Genus: Trachypepla
- Species: T. photinella

Binomial name
- Trachypepla photinella (Meyrick, 1883)

Synonyms
- Eulechria photinella Meyrick, 1883

= Trachypepla photinella =

Species of moth endemic to New Zealand

Trachypepla photinella is a moth of the family Oecophoridae first described by Edward Meyrick in 1883. It is endemic to New Zealand and has been collected in Wellington, Wainuiomata, D'Urville Island and Christchurch. The preferred habitat of this species is native forest and adults are on the wing from December until February.

== Taxonomy ==
This species was first described by Edward Meyrick in 1883 using a specimen collected in the Wellington Botanic Garden in January and named Eulechria photinella. In 1918 Meyrick placed this species in the genus Trachypepla. This placement was followed by George Hudson when he discussed and illustrated this species in his book The butterflies and moths of New Zealand. The male holotype specimen is held at the Natural History Museum, London.

== Description ==
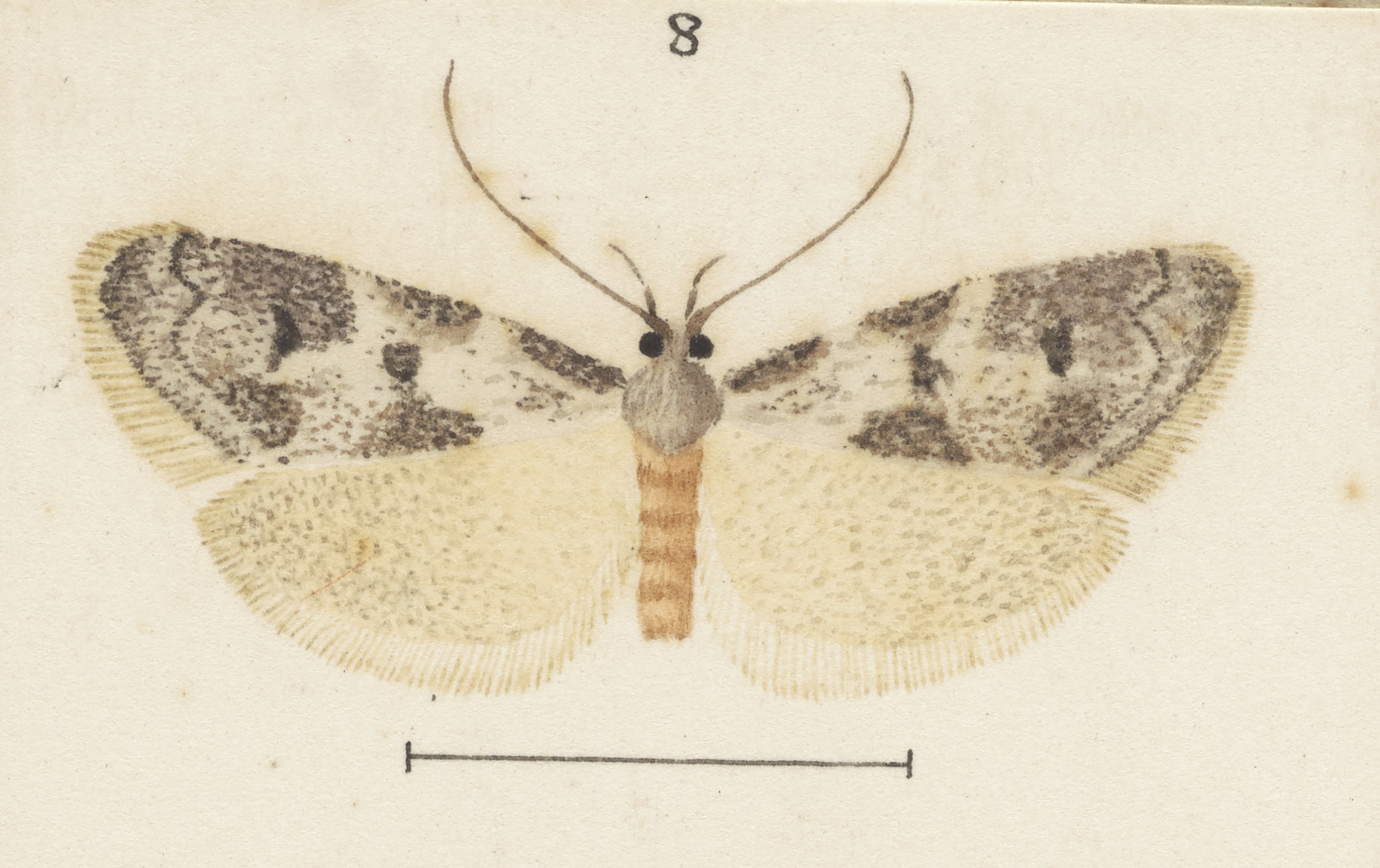
Illustration of male.

Meyrick described this species as follows:

♂. 17 mm. Head fuscous-grey mixed with ochreous- whitish, especially on face. Palpi fuscous-grey, base of terminal joint, and extreme apex of second ochreous-whitish. Antennae fuscous- grey. Thorax fuscous-grey, irrorated with whitish. Abdomen light ochreous-grey, anal tuft whitish-ochreous. Anterior and middle legs dark fuscous-grey, with ochreous-whitish rings at middle and apex of tibiae, and apex of tarsal joints; posterior legs ochreous-whitish, tarsal joints grey towards base. Fore-wings moderately elongate, somewhat dilated, costa moderately strongly arched, apex round-pointed, hindmargin very obliquely rounded; light fuscous-grey, irregularly irrorated and suffused with whitish, especially in disc and posteriorly; base of wing very narrowly suffused with dark fuscous; a very ill-defined small dark fuscous-grey spot on costa at f, and a similar rather larger one on costa slightly beyond middle; a third on inner margin slightly before middle; a tolerably well-defined small roundish dark fuscous spot in disc before middle, a second obliquely before it on fold, and a third in disc beyond middle; a short inwardly oblique cloudy dark fuscous-grey streak from costa at 4/5, emitting an irregular outwards-curved line to inner margin before anal angle; apex dark fuscous-grey; cilia whitish, at and above apex suffused with grey, on basal half irregularly mixed with dark fuscous-grey. Hindwings grey; cilia white, with a dark-grey line near base.

== Distribution ==
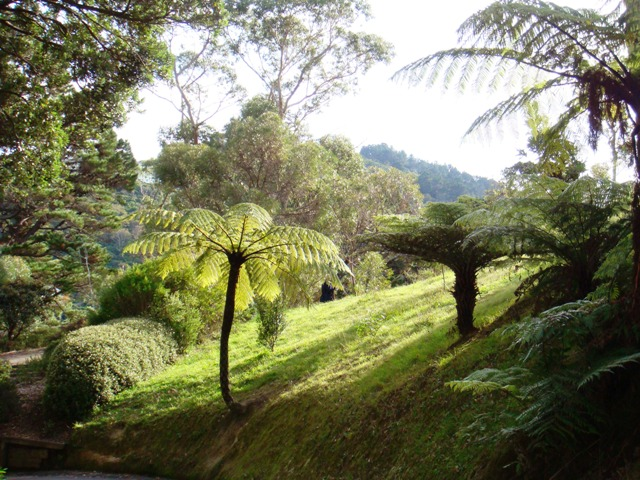
Type locality, Wellington Botanic Garden.

T. photinella is endemic to New Zealand. As well as the type locality this species has been documented as having been collected in Wainuiomata, at D'Urville Island and in Christchurch.

== Habitat ==
The preferred habitat of this species is native forest.

== Behaviour ==
Adults of this species are on the wing from December to February.
