= Li Guizhi =

Chinese swimmer (born 1993)

Personal information
- Nationality: Chinese
- Born: July 4, 1993 (age 32)

Sport
- Sport: Swimming
Medal record
Representing China
Women's Paralympic swimming
Summer Paralympics
Gold medal – first place	2016 Rio de Janeiro	50 m freestyle S11
Gold medal – first place	2020 Tokyo	100 m freestyle S11
Silver medal – second place	2016 Rio de Janeiro	100 m freestyle S11
Silver medal – second place	2012 London	50 m freestyle S11
Silver medal – second place	2020 Tokyo	50 m freestyle S11
Silver medal – second place	2024 Paris	100 m backstroke S11
Bronze medal – third place	2012 London	100 m freestyle S11
Bronze medal – third place	2020 Tokyo	100 m backstroke S11
World Championships
Gold medal – first place	2015 Glasgow	50 m freestyleS11
Silver medal – second place	2013 Montreal	50 m freestyle S11
Bronze medal – third place	2013 Montreal	100 m freestyle S11
Bronze medal – third place	2015 Glasgow	100 m freestyle S11
Bronze medal – third place	2015 Glasgow	400 m freestyle S11
Bronze medal – third place	2019 London	50 m freestyle S11
Bronze medal – third place	2019 London	100 m freestyle S11
Asian Para Games
Gold medal – first place	2022 Hangzhou	50 m freestyle S11

Li Guizhi (born July 4, 1993) is a Chinese swimmer.

== Career ==
At the 2012 Summer Paralympics she won a silver medal at the Women's 50 metre freestyle S11 event and a bronze medal at the Women's 100 metre freestyle S11 event.

At the 2016 Summer Paralympics she won a gold medal at the Women's 50 metre freestyle S11 event with a world record and paralympic record of 30.73 and a silver medal at the Women's 100 metre freestyle S11 event with 1:08.31.
