= Pinehurst School =

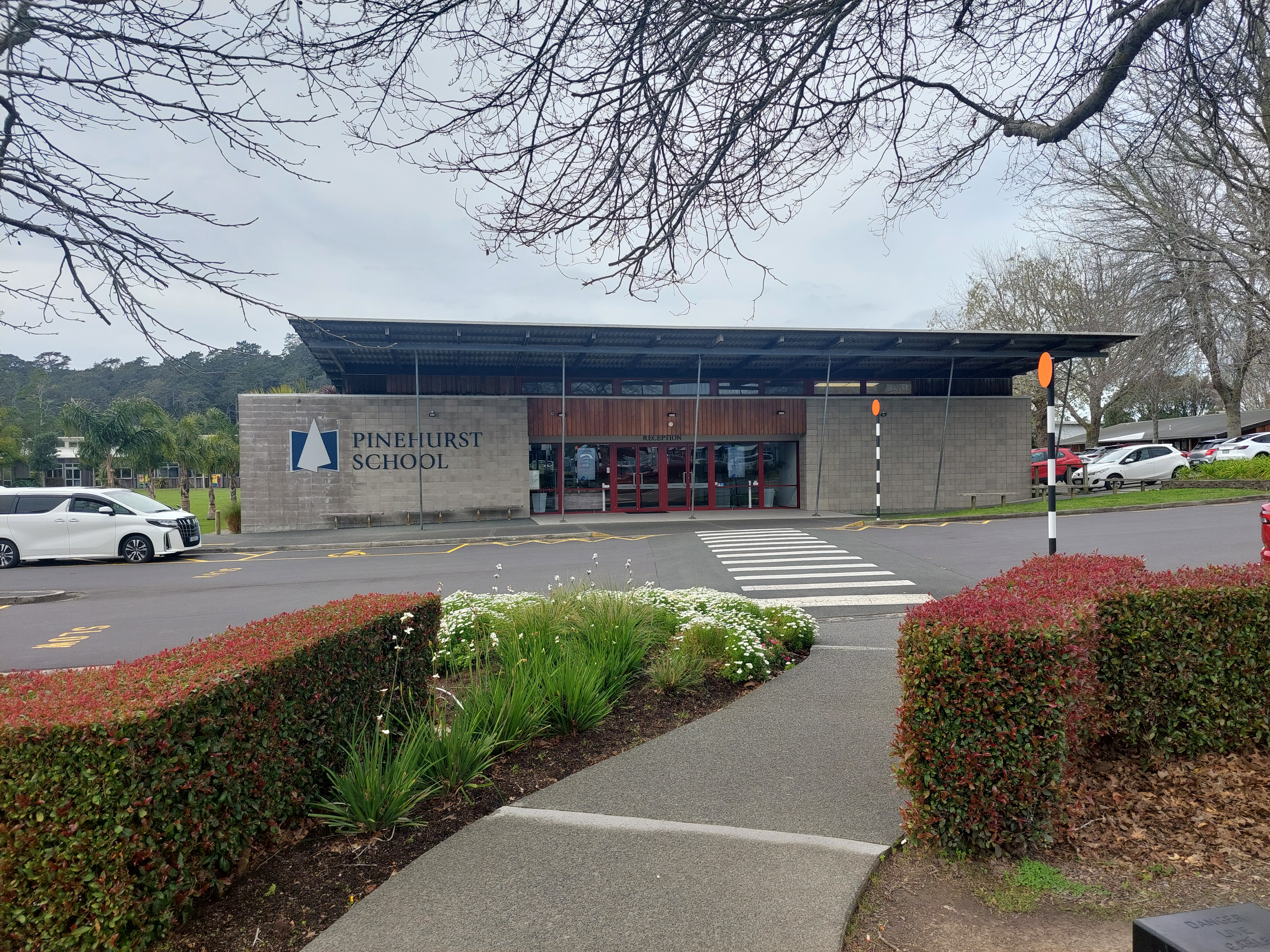
- The Reception Building, Pinehurst School

Location
- 75 Bush Road, Albany, Auckland; 36.7402°S 174.7048°E

Information
- Type: Private co-ed composite, years 1–13
- Motto: Proud of who we are, what we know and what we can achieve.
- Established: 1991
- Ministry of Education Institution no.: 440
- Principal: Mike Waller
- Enrolment: 1,145 (July 2026)
- Houses: Kauri, Matai, Rimu, Totara
- Socio-economic decile: 10
- Website: pinehurst.school.nz

Pinehurst School is a private education institute located in Auckland, New Zealand with a roll of 1,145 students in July 2026. The institute was established on 3 March 1991,

The school offers the International General Certificate of Secondary Education, IGCSE examination.

== Enrolment ==
As a private school, Pinehurst School charges tuition fees to cover costs. For the 2026 school year, tuition fees for New Zealand residents are $19,300 per year for students in years 1 to 6, $21,790 per year for students in years 7 and 8, and $23,990 per year for students in Year 9 and above.

International students are charged higher tuition fees. For the 2026 school year, fees for international students are $32,020 per year for students in Years 1 to 6, $37,911 per year for students in Years 7 and 8, and $42,590 per year for students in Years 9 to 13.

As of July 2026, Pinehurst School has roll of 1,145 students, of which 8 (0.7%) identify as Māori. As a private school, the school is not assigned an Equity Index.

== Facilities ==
In the year 2007, the leader of the National party John Key opened the new arts and drama facility, which won an Institute of Architects northern region award.

In 2015 the school proposed a new college block and a new multi-sports area to replace existing tennis courts. A new library block was completed in November 2019, and was officially opened on 10 February 2020, by Erica Stanford, MP of East Coast Bays. The proposed College 5 block was completed in 2023, including a new amphitheater which seats 250 and classroom block replacing the Village.

== Notable alumni ==
- Áine Kelly-Costello, paralympic swimmer
- Lydia Ko, golfer

== Gallery ==
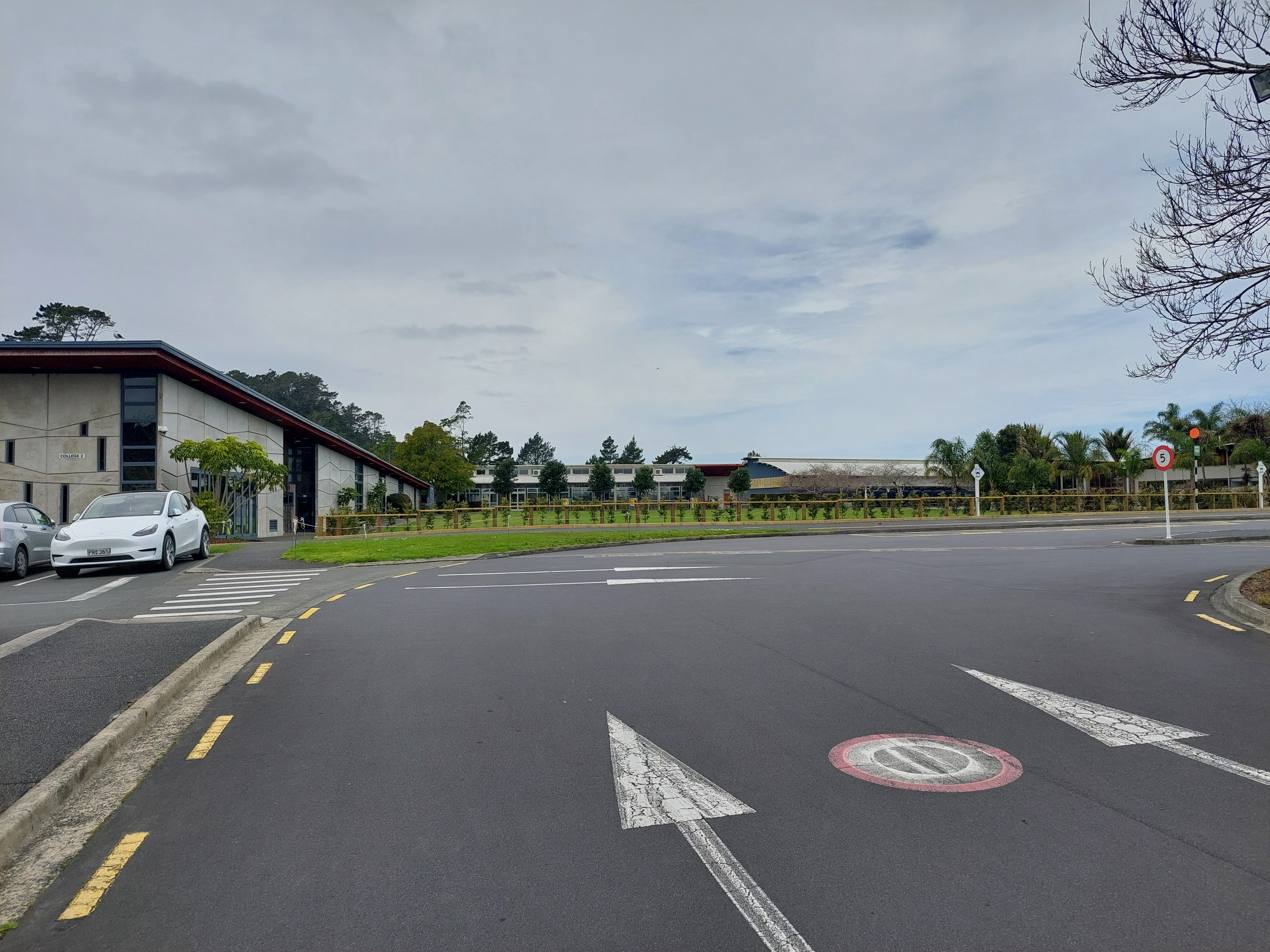
View of colleges and gym

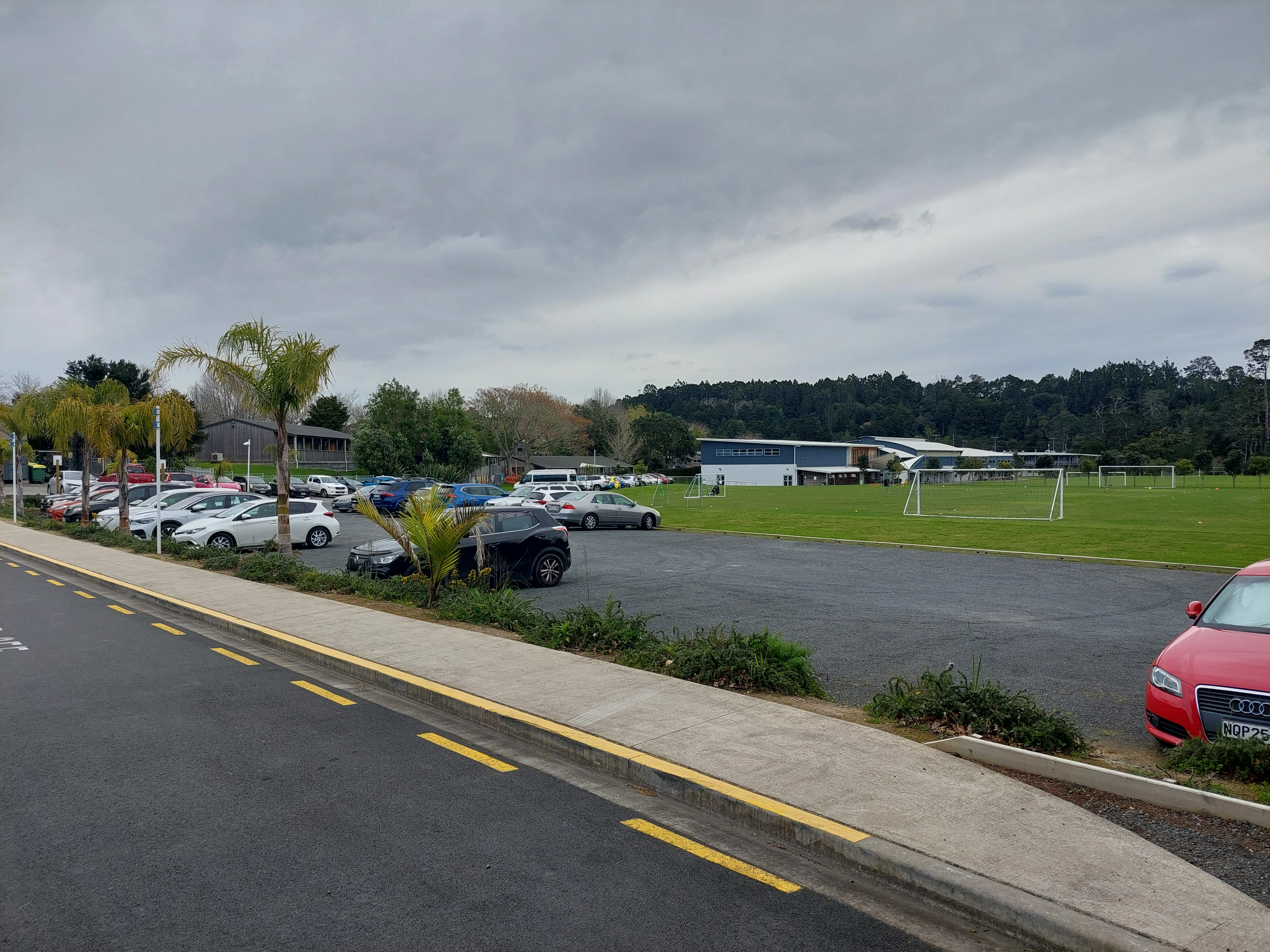
Sports amenities, library and arena
