= Amber Thomas =

Canadian Paralympic swimmer (born 1993)

Personal information
- Born: Amber Thomas; November 17, 1993 (age 32) Drayton Valley, Alberta, Canada

Sport
- Disability class: S11, SB11, SM11
Medal record
Representing Canada
Paralympic Games
Silver medal – second place	2012 London	S11 400 m freestyle
Bronze medal – third place	2012 London	SM11 200 m ind. medley
IPC Swimming World Championships
Silver medal – second place	2010 Eindhoven	S11 100 m butterfly
Silver medal – second place	2010 Eindhoven	S11 400 m freestyle
- Updated on 9 Dec 2014

Amber Thomas (born November 17, 1993) is a Canadian swimmer. She lost her sight at ten years old due to a brain tumour and is classified in the S11 disability class.

At the age of fifteen Thomas competed at the 2008 Summer Paralympics but did not win any medals. In 2010, she came second in the 100 m butterfly and 400 m freestyle at the IPC World Championships. She entered six categories at the London 2012 Paralympics and gained two medals: bronze in the 200 m individual medley and silver in the 400 m freestyle.

Thomas is now retired from competitive swimming. She has stated an intention to work in animal massage and is considering competing in equestrianism in the future.
