= Áine Kelly-Costello =

Paralympic swimmer and disability rights activist

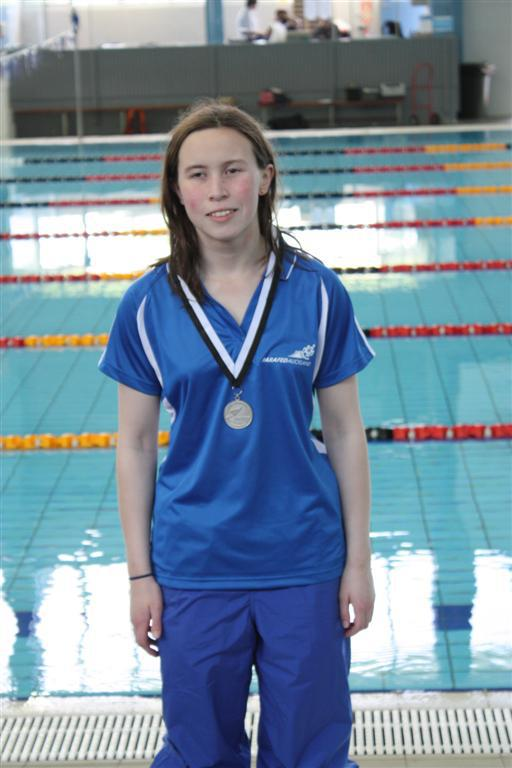
- Kelly-Costello in 2011

Personal information
- Born: Áine Maeve Kelly-Costello; 30 March 1995 (age 31)

Sport
- Country: New Zealand
- Sport: Para swimming
- Disability class: S11

Áine Maeve Kelly-Costello (born 30 March 1995) is a New Zealand climate justice and disability rights campaigner and journalist, and musician. They competed in the London 2012 Paralympic Games in swimming, becoming New Zealand Paralympian #180.

== Early life ==
Kelly-Costello attended Pinehurst School in Auckland, New Zealand. Their school nominated them for the 2012 Sir George Elliot Scholarship and they were one of the three successful applicants; scholarship recipients are chosen for their academic ability and having experienced a challenging background.

== Para swimming career ==
Kelly-Costello competed in Para swimming as a teenager. They won four gold medals at the 2009 Australian Paralympic Youth Games in Melbourne, VIC, Australia. Kelly-Costello is blind and competed in the S11 sports class. They have a rare recessive genetic disorder known as Leber congenital amaurosis.

They were selected to the New Zealand team for the London 2012 Paralympic Games. They competed in four freestyle and backstroke events.

Kelly-Costello retired from Para swimming following London 2012 aged 17 to focus on their passion for music.

== Career as a climate justice and disability advocate ==
Kelly-Costello worked as a community organiser for the Access Matters campaign for accessibility law.

In 2021, they completed a Masters in Investigative Journalism from Gothenburg University, conducting for their thesis a qualitative analysis on the practice of climate change journalism. This work has been featured in The Conversation. Their writing on climate justice and disability rights has also appeared in other prominent media outlets.

They host and produce Disability Crosses Borders, an independent podcast and blog featuring conversations where disability, migration and culture meet.

== Passion for music ==
As a musician, Kelly-Costello plays a variety of instruments, and has led the New Zealand Symphony Orchestra in concert.
