= Xie Qing =

Chinese Paralympic swimmer

Personal information
- Nationality: Chinese
- Born: February 11, 1988 (age 38)

Sport
- Sport: Swimming
Medal record
Representing China
Women's Paralympic swimming
Summer Paralympics
Gold medal – first place	2016 Rio de Janeiro	Women's 100 metre freestyle S11
Bronze medal – third place	2016 Rio de Janeiro	Women's 400 metre freestyle S11
Bronze medal – third place	2016 Rio de Janeiro	Women's 200 metre individual medley SM11

Xie Qing (born February 11, 1988) is a Chinese swimmer. At the 2016 Summer Paralympics she won a gold medal at the Women's 100 metre freestyle S11 event with 1:08.03, a bronze medal at the Women's 400 metre freestyle S11 event with 5:25.14 and another bronze medal at the Women's 200 metre individual medley SM11 event with 2:51.98.
