= Letticia Martinez =

American Paralympic swimmer

Personal information
- Nationality: United States
- Born: July 16, 1995 (age 30) Las Cruces, New Mexico
- Height: 5 ft 1 in (1.55 m)
- Weight: 109 lb (49 kg)

Sport
- Sport: Swimming
- Strokes: Breaststroke, freestyle
Medal record
Athletics
Paralympic Games
Gold medal – first place	2011 Guadalajara	Women's 50 metre freestyle S11
Silver medal – second place	2011 Guadalajara	Women's 100 metre breaststroke S11
Silver medal – second place	2011 Guadalajara	Women's 100 metre freestyle S11

Letticia Martinez (born July 16, 1995) is an American Paralympic swimmer who is both long course and short course American record holder.

== Biography ==
Martinez was born in Las Cruces, New Mexico. At the age of three, she was diagnosed with Leber's congenital amaurosis. Martinez graduated from Las Cruces High School in 2013. She won a gold medal for 50 metres (160 ft) freestyle swim at 2011 Parapan American Games where she also got 2 silver medals for 100 metres (330 ft) breaststroke and freestyle.
