= Cecilia Camellini =

Italian Paralympic swimmer (born 1992)

Personal information
- Born: 10 March 1992 (age 34) Modena, Italy

Sport
- Country: Italy
- Sport: Paralympic swimming
- Disability: Visually impaired
- Disability class: S11
- Club: ASD Tricolore
- Coached by: Alessandro Cocchi

Achievements and titles
- Personal bests: 100m Freestyle S11: 1:07.29; 100m Backstroke S11: 1:19.64
Medal record
Paralympic Games
Gold medal – first place	2012 London	50 m freestyle S11
Gold medal – first place	2012 London	100 m freestyle S11
Silver medal – second place	2008 Beijing	50 m freestyle S11
Silver medal – second place	2008 Beijing	100 m freestyle S11
Bronze medal – third place	2012 London	400 m freestyle S11
Bronze medal – third place	2012 London	100 m backstroke S11
Bronze medal – third place	2016 Rio	400 m freestyle S11
IPC European Championships
Gold medal – first place	2009 Reykjavik	100 m freestyle – S11
Gold medal – first place	2016 Funchal	100 m freestyle S11
Silver medal – second place	2009 Reykjavik	50 m freestyle – S11
Silver medal – second place	2016 Funchal	400 m freestyle S11
Bronze medal – third place	2016 Funchal	50 m freestyle S11
Bronze medal – third place	2016 Funchal	100 m backstroke S11

Cecilia Camellini (born 10 March 1992 in Modena) is a visually-impaired, born blind, Paralympic swimmer of Italy. At the 2008 Summer Paralympics she won two silver medals. At the 2012 Summer Paralympics she won two gold in world record time, and two bronze medals.

Camellini is an athlete of the Gruppo Sportivo Fiamme Oro.

== Biography ==
Blind since birth, started swimming at the age of three years.

== World records ==
- 100m Freestyle S11: 1:07.29 ( (United Kingdom) London, 31 August 2012)
- 100m Backstroke S11: 1:19.64 ( (Germany) Berlin, 28 June 2012)

== Others achievements ==
Year	Competition	Venue	Position	Event	Performance	Notes
2010	IPC Swimming World Championships	(Netherlands) Eindhoven	1st	100m Freestyle S11	1:08.56	
2010	IPC Swimming World Championships	(Netherlands) Eindhoven	1st	100m Backstroke S11	1:19.78	
2010	IPC Swimming World Championships	(Netherlands) Eindhoven	2nd	200m Individual Medley SM11	2:58.17	
2010	IPC Swimming World Championships	(Netherlands) Eindhoven	2nd	50m Freestyle S11	31.85	

== See also ==
- List of IPC world records in swimming – Women's long course
- Swimming at the 2012 Summer Paralympics
