= Mayfield, New Zealand =

There are three places in New Zealand called Mayfield:

- Mayfield, Canterbury, a settlement in Canterbury
- Mayfield, Marlborough, a suburb of Blenheim
- Glenfield, New Zealand, a suburb of Auckland known as Mayfield until 1912
