= Glenfield, New Zealand =

Glenfield
- Suburb
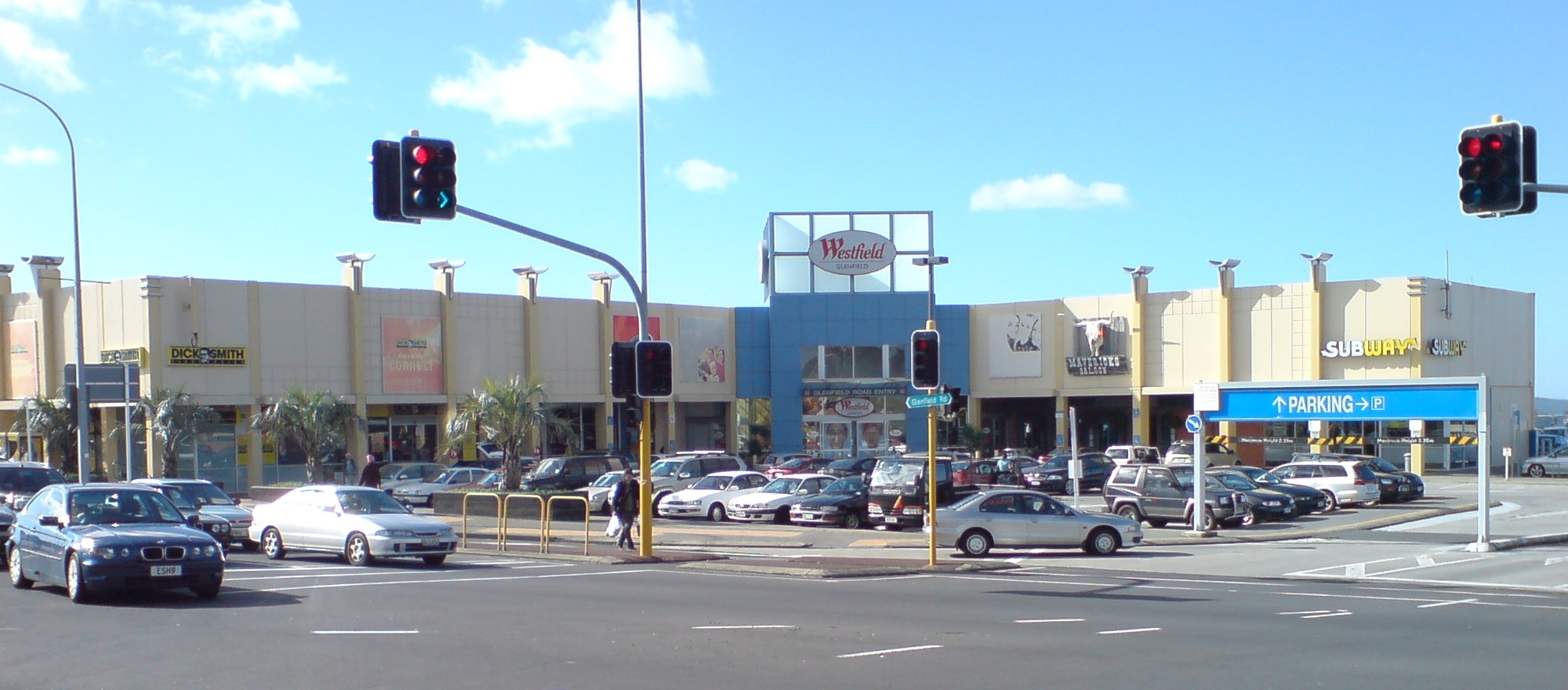
- The front top parking lot at Glenfield Mall. Most of the parking, and most of the mall itself, is behind and below on further levels. (Photo taken prior to overhaul in the mid-2010s)
- Interactive map of Glenfield
- Coordinates: 36.782°S 174.721°E
- Country: New Zealand
- City: Auckland
- Local authority: Auckland Council
- Electoral ward: North Shore Ward
- Local board: Kaipātiki Local Board

Area
  - Land: 472 ha (1,170 acres)

Population (June 2025)
  - Total: 18,570
  - Density: 3,930/km^{2} (10,200/sq mi)
- Postcode: 0629

Bayview	Tōtara Vale	Forrest Hill
Witheford Heights	Glenfield	Wairau Valley
	Birkenhead	Hillcrest

Glenfield (Māori: Te Wairau) is a suburb of Auckland, New Zealand, located on the North Shore. Established as a rural community in the 1850s, the area developed as a suburban part of Auckland after the completion of the Auckland Harbour Bridge in 1959.

== Etymology ==
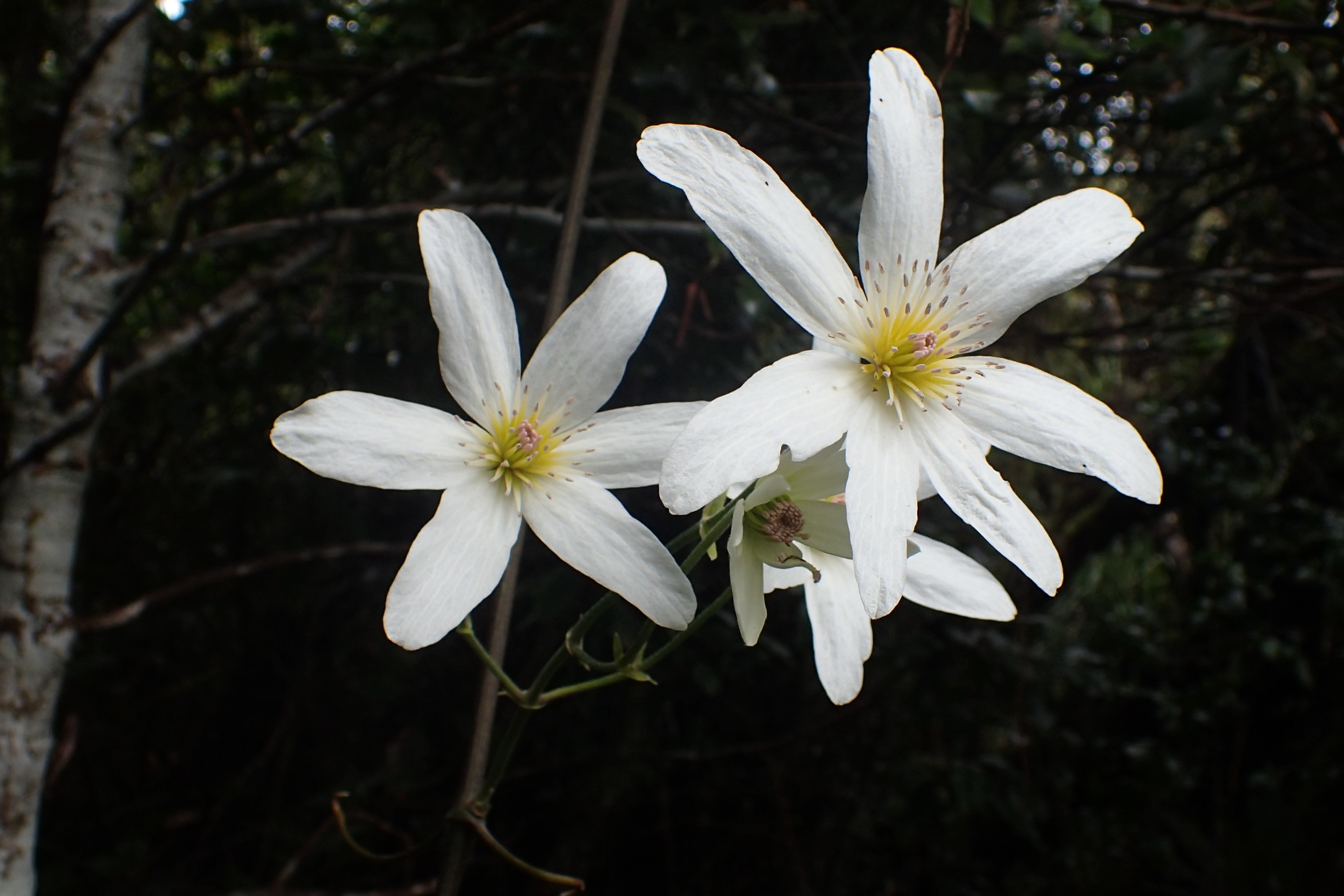
The name Opuawananga, which refers to Clematis paniculata (puawānanga), is associated with the Glenfield area

The name Mayfield was first associated with the area in the late 19th century. Before this, settlers considered the area rural sections of Takapuna, Birkenhead or Northcote. The name was first used in an advertisement by R. Arthur, a landowner who subdivided 250 acres of land in 1883. The name was adopted by residents for the school and area in 1890, referring to the blossoming white mānuka bushes that residents felt were reminiscent of springtime (i.e. May) in England. In 1912, local residents petitioned the post office to change the name of the area to Glenfield. Until this point, the post office used the name Freemans, referring to John Freeman, the homeowner who operated the post office from his home from 1888. The post office had refused to use the name Mayfield, due to potential confusion with Mayfield in the Canterbury Region.

The first name on early colonial maps associated with the area is Opuawananga, which refers to puawānanga, a native species of clematis. The name was used to refer to an inland bush area of the North Shore where puawānanga grew, which early European settlers called Quick's Bush. In 2013, Glenfield College adopted the name Te Puawānanga for the school's whare wānanga.

== Geography ==
Glenfield is a suburb of the North Shore of New Zealand. It is located between the Kaipātiki Creek, a tributary of Oruamo or Hellyers Creek, and the Wairau Valley. The highest point in the suburb is a hill between Colin Wild Place and Chivalry Road, which reaches a height of 83 metres (272 ft) above sea level.

The area is primarily formed from Early Miocene Waitemata Group sandstone and mudstone. Prior to human settlement, the area was a kauri and mixed podocarp forest, which by the 19th century developed into a mānuka-dominated scrubland.

Areas within Glenfield include Marlborough, an area of south-eastern Glenfield that developed in the 1960s and early 1970s on the site of Alex Anderson's former farm, and Glenfield North.

== History ==
=== Māori history ===
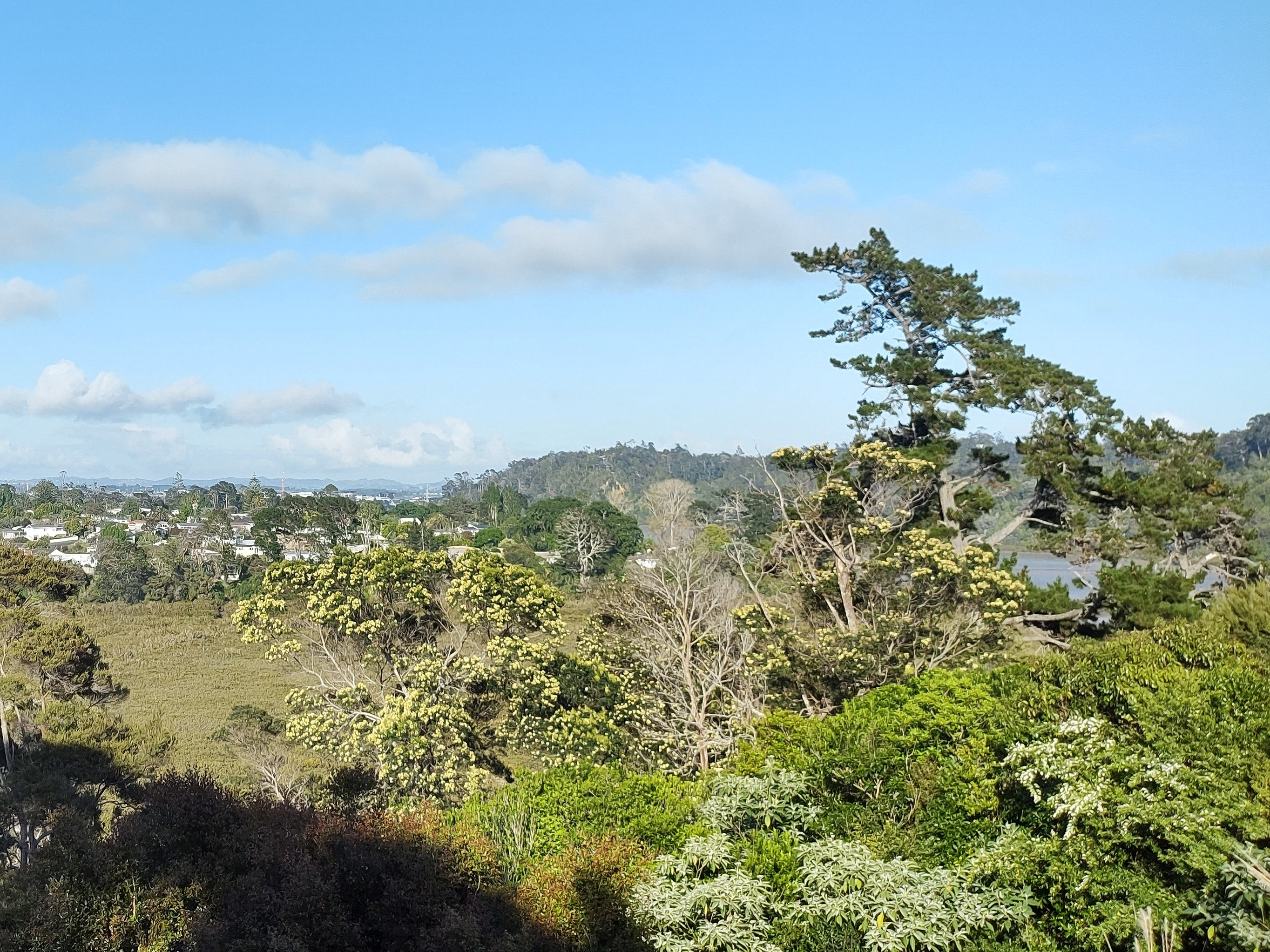
Archaeological middens have been found on the shores of the Kaipātiki Creek

Māori settlement of the Auckland Region began around the 13th or 14th centuries. The North Shore was settled by Tāmaki Māori, including people descended from the Tainui migratory canoe and ancestors of figures such as Taikehu and Peretū. Many of the early Tāmaki Māori people of the North Shore identified as Ngā Oho,

The poor clay soils of the area were not suitable for Māori traditional gardening techniques, meaning Glenfield was not as densely settled as other areas of the North Shore, such as the Upper Waitematā Harbour eastern shores or the Devonport-Takapuna areas. The forests of the inland North Shore were a place where berries were harvested.

Archaeological middens have been found on the shores of the Kaipātiki Creek, and Manuka Road was originally an ara (traditional path) linking Oruamo or Hellyers Creek to the central North Shore.

The warrior Maki migrated from the Kāwhia Harbour to his ancestral home in the Auckland Region, likely sometime in the 17th century. Maki conquered and unified many the Tāmaki Māori tribes as Te Kawerau ā Maki, including those of the North Shore. After Maki's death, his sons settled different areas of his lands, creating new hapū. His younger son Maraeariki settled the North Shore and Hibiscus Coast, who based himself at the head of the Ōrewa River. Maraeariki's daughter Kahu succeeded him, and she is the namesake of the North Shore, Te Whenua Roa o Kahu ("The Greater Lands of Kahu"), Many of the iwi of the North Shore, including Ngāti Manuhiri, Ngāti Maraeariki, Ngāti Kahu, Ngāti Poataniwha, Ngāi Tai ki Tāmaki and Ngāti Whātua, can trace their lineage to Kahu.

During the early 1820s, most Māori of the North Shore fled for the Waikato or Northland due to the threat of war parties during the Musket Wars. When Tāmaki Māori returned in greater numbers to the Auckland Region in the mid-1830s, Te Kawerau ā Maki focused settlement at Te Henga / Bethells Beach.

=== Early European settlement ===
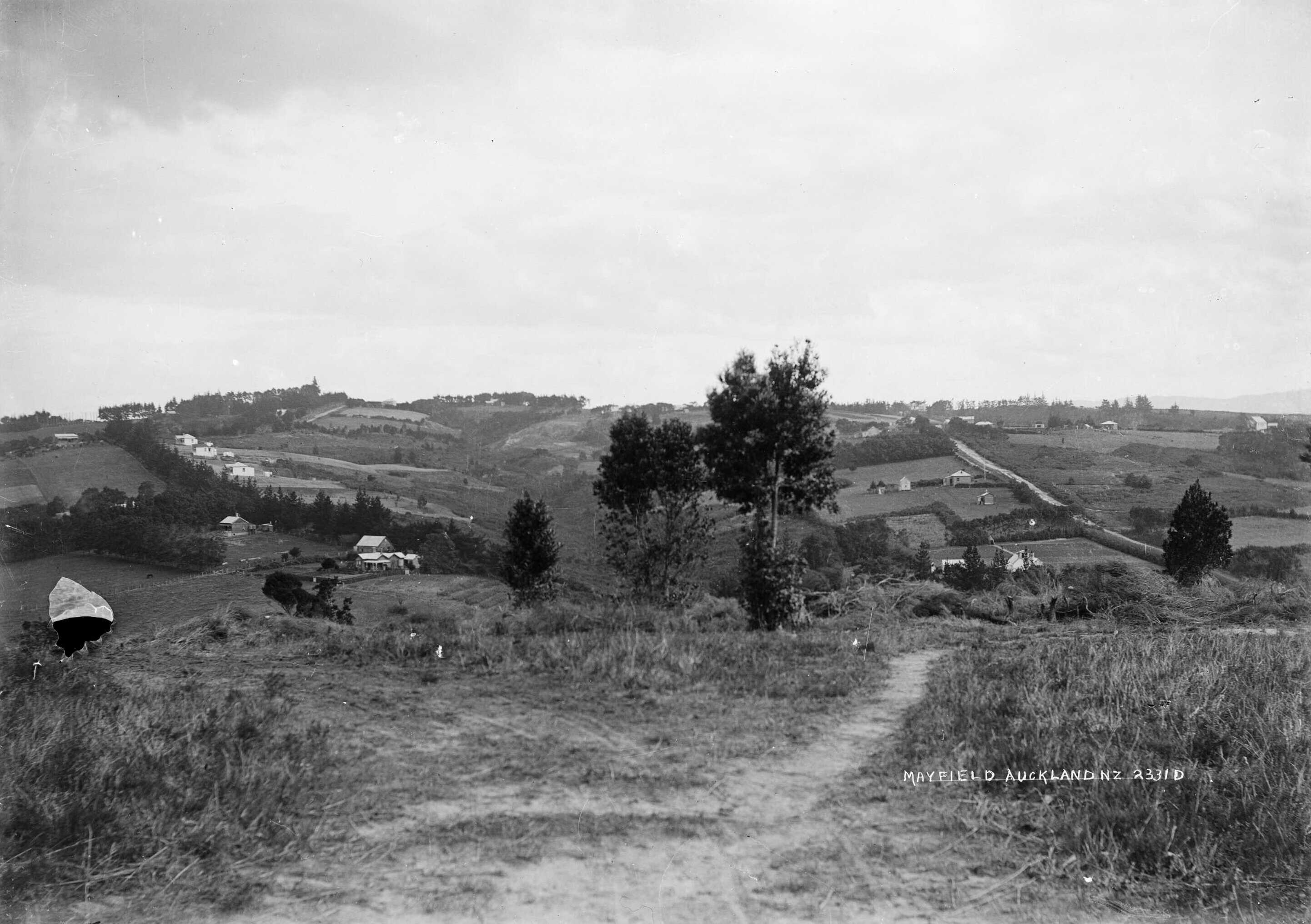
View of rural Glenfield circa 1915

One of the earliest land sales to European settlers in Auckland took place near Glenfield on 17 April 1837, when Ngāti Whātua rangatira Nanihi and Tuire sold Te Pukapuka, a 320 acres (130 ha) block to American whaler William Webster, at the north-eastern headwaters of Oruamo or Hellyers Creek, near Bayview. Webster on-sold the land to Thomas Hellyer on 13 October 1840, who established the Retreat, a house which included a kauri sawpit, a hut, and a workshop. The Retreat became well known among sailors, who would stop at the Retreat for fresh water and beer from the Retreat's brewhouse. On 22 December 1841, Hellyer's body was discovered at the Retreat, and while an investigation took place, no person was convicted of his murder.

Glenfield was a part of the Mahurangi Block, which was purchased by the New Zealand Government in 1841. In the 1850s, the first European settlers in Glenfield developed orchards and dairy farms, including the Mackay and McFetridge families. The surrounding areas were worked by gum diggers, from 1859 up until the 1920s. Gum diggers would regularly set fire to the mānuka scrubland, in order to more easily locate kauri gum.

Windy Ridge was one of the first areas of inland Glenfield by European settlers, when Terence and Elizabeth Crook purchased 569 acres (230 ha) north of Coronation Road, known as Gooches Corner. The section was later farmed by Minnie Gracie and her husband Arthur Moore Gracie.

=== Rural community ===
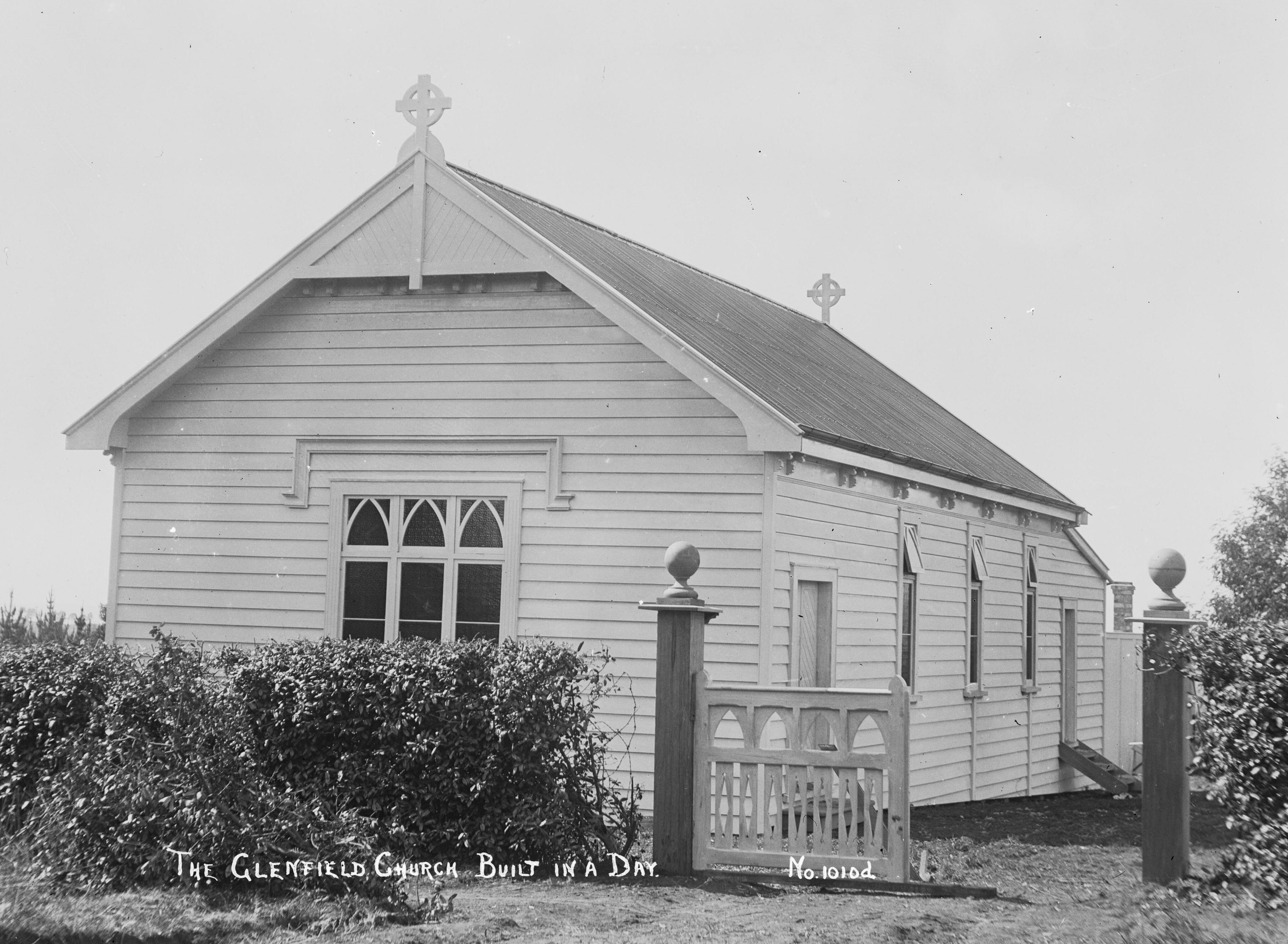
Glenfield Mission Hall, which was constructed in a day on 4 September 1915

In the latter 19th and early 20th centuries, the main connection to the outside world were bush tracks. Fruit and farm produce would be carried along tracks and horse carriages to Northcote and Birkenhead, then on to Auckland markets by ferry.

Glenfield developed as a rural community centred on Mayfield Road in the 1880s, developing after major improvements were made to the road at Aranui Bluff / Cut Hill in 1885. By 1889, 24 cottages were built in the area surrounding Cut Hill, and a kauri gum store was established at the junction of Sunset and Glenfield roads in the 1890s. By this time, the name Mayfield had become associated with the area. Dairy farms located in rural Glenfield supplied milk to Auckland, and the farms north of Glenfield specialised in supplying cream.

In 1888, the first post office was established at Glenfield, named Freemans after John Freeman's residence on the corner of Kaipatiki Road. In 1890, the New Zealand Hydropathic and Fruit Hospital was established at Glenfield, as a facility that treated conditions such as rheumatic gout, hysteria, dropsy, diabetes and constipation through treatments such as vegan diets and therapeutic baths.

In 1891, Mayfield School was opened, becoming a social centre for the growing area. Events such as card nights and concerts were held at the school in the 1900s, and residents complained of events where alcohol was consumed, which often left the school in a poor state, and was seen as causing rowdy behaviour and mayhem in the community. In 1912, the area was officially renamed Glenfield, due to issues the post office had with the name Mayfield being confused with Mayfield in the Canterbury Region.

On 4 September 1915, the local community constructed Mission Hall in a single day. The hall was a shared religious space used by local Anglican, Methodist and Presbyterian communities. By the 1920s, the first store was established on Glenfield Road, as well as two brickworks, which closed in the 1930s. By the late 1920s motorcars were becoming more popular than horses for transportation in Glenfield.

In the 1920s, local resident James Mackay discovered the Captain Cook strawberry variety at his land at Cooks Beach. The variety was smaller and sweeter than previously popular varieties, and from 1929 Glenfield growers invested in this strawberry crop. The Captain Cook strawberry became the most popular strawberry variety in the Auckland Region for the next few decades.

The Glenfield War Memorial Hall, first called for in the 1900s as a substitute for the school hall, was finally built in 1934. The hall hosted major social events, including elaborate coronation balls.

=== Suburbanisation ===
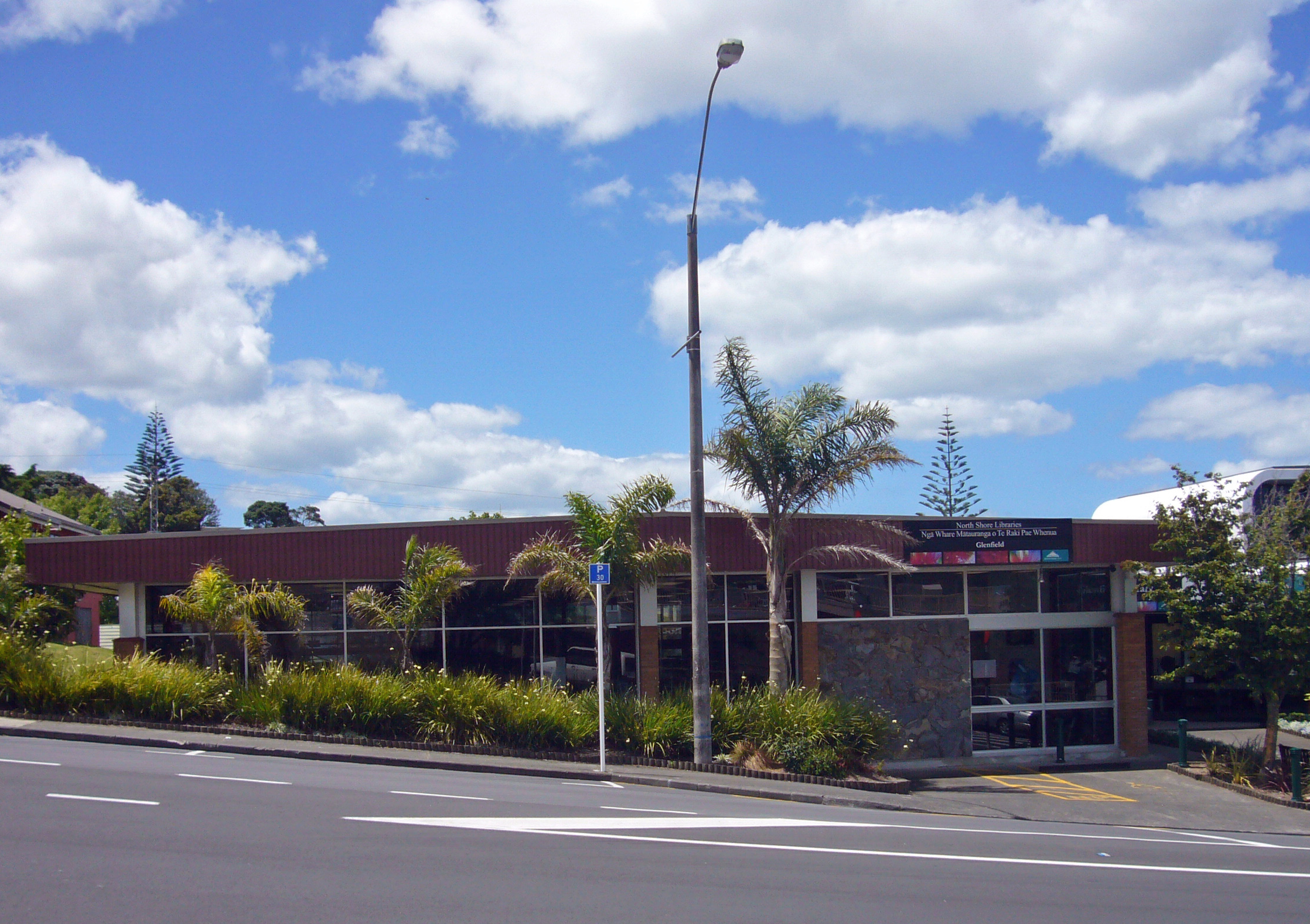
Glenfield Public Library was constructed in 1975

The opening of the Auckland Harbour Bridge in 1959 led to rapid suburbanisation of Glenfield. After Glenfield was declared a county town in 1961, the population grew from 5,683 to 13,335 in 1966, and increased to 22,098 by 1971. Most of the suburb was developed in the 1960s, with the western areas of Glenfield developing into suburban housing later on.

With a rapidly increasingly population, the Waitemata County Council decided to establish a rubbish dump on reclaimed land in the Oruamo or Hellyers Creek foreshore in 1969. The plans were widely protested by residents, and were scuppered by the New Zealand Airforce, who insisted that no landfills could be located within one nautical mile of the RNZAF Base at Whenuapai or the RNZAF Station Hobsonville.

Glenfield was one of the most rapidly developing areas of New Zealand in the early 1970s. On 9 December 1971, in response to fears about commercial sprawl down the length of Glenfield Road, Glenfield Mall opened. It was the first shopping mall on the North Shore. The Glenfield Library was constructed in 1975.

In 2000, Glenfield Mall was redeveloped as a more modern shopping centre.

== Notable people ==
- James K. Baxter, author and poet. While not a resident, Baxter died in Glenfield in October 1972.
- Janet Frame, author who lived in Glenfield in the 1970s
- Rachel Hunter, model who was raised in Glenfield

== Amenities ==
- Southern Cross Hospital North Harbour, a privately owned hospital, is in Wairau Road.
- Agincourt Reserve, home to the Marlborough Kindergarten and North Shore Woodturners Guild, established in 1984.
- Marlborough Park, a suburban park which features playgrounds, the Marlborough Park Tennis Club, and the Marlborough Park Skate Park, which opened in 2020. It the home of Kaipātiki Community Trust and Marlborough Park Hall.

== Education ==
Glenfield College, founded in 1969, is a secondary (years 9–13) school with a roll of 768 students. Glenfield Intermediate, founded in 1972, is an intermediate (years 7–8) school with 443 students. Glenfield Primary School, founded in 1959, is a contributing primary (years 1–6) school with a roll of 295. Marlborough Primary School is a coeducational contributing primary (years 1–6) school with a decile rating of 7 and a roll of 274, and Windy Ridge School is a coeducational contributing primary school (years 1–6), with a decile rating of 7 and a roll of 198, which includes two satellite classes from Wilson School for students with intellectual or physical disabilities. All schools are coeducational. Rolls are as of July 2026.

The South Seas Film, Television, and Animation school is in Glenfield.

== Sport ==
Glenfield is home to Glenfield RFC, who are a member of the North Harbour Rugby Union, and Glenfield Rovers, who compete in the Lotto Sport Italia NRFL Division 1B. The Glenfield Greyhounds rugby league club are based in nearby Sunnynook.

== Demographics ==
Glenfield covers 4.72 km^{2} (1.82 sq mi) and had an estimated population of 18,570 as of June 2025, with a population density of 3,934 inhabitants per square kilometre (10,190/sq mi).

Historical population
Year	Pop.	±% p.a.
2006	14,370	—
2013	15,414	+1.01%
2018	16,872	+1.82%
2023	16,731	−0.17%

Glenfield had a population of 16,731 in the 2023 New Zealand census, a decrease of 141 people (−0.8%) since the 2018 census, and an increase of 1,317 people (8.5%) since the 2013 census. There were 8,397 males, 8,283 females and 54 people of other genders in 5,412 dwellings. 3.5% of people identified as LGBTIQ+. There were 2,907 people (17.4%) aged under 15 years, 3,411 (20.4%) aged 15 to 29, 8,439 (50.4%) aged 30 to 64, and 1,971 (11.8%) aged 65 or older.

People could identify as more than one ethnicity. The results were 39.8% European (Pākehā); 7.0% Māori; 5.5% Pasifika; 51.7% Asian; 4.0% Middle Eastern, Latin American and African New Zealanders (MELAA); and 2.4% other, which includes people giving their ethnicity as "New Zealander". English was spoken by 90.3%, Māori language by 1.4%, Samoan by 0.9%, and other languages by 41.3%. No language could be spoken by 2.3% (e.g. too young to talk). New Zealand Sign Language was known by 0.3%. The percentage of people born overseas was 57.1, compared with 28.8% nationally.

Religious affiliations were 37.5% Christian, 4.9% Hindu, 2.4% Islam, 0.4% Māori religious beliefs, 3.0% Buddhist, 0.3% New Age, 0.1% Jewish, and 2.1% other religions. People who answered that they had no religion were 44.0%, and 5.4% of people did not answer the census question.

Of those at least 15 years old, 4,845 (35.0%) people had a bachelor's or higher degree, 5,277 (38.2%) had a post-high school certificate or diploma, and 3,696 (26.7%) people exclusively held high school qualifications. 1,542 people (11.2%) earned over $100,000 compared to 12.1% nationally. The employment status of those at least 15 was that 7,980 (57.7%) people were employed full-time, 1,626 (11.8%) were part-time, and 393 (2.8%) were unemployed.

Individual statistical areas
Name	Area (km^{2})	Population	Density (per km^{2})	Dwellings	Median age	Median income
Glenfield North	0.81	3,492	4,311	1,101	35.1 years	$46,800
Glenfield West	0.97	3,036	3,130	1,017	36.0 years	$45,200
Glenfield South West	1.19	3,837	3,224	1,245	35.8 years	$50,600
Glenfield Central	1.13	4,119	3,645	1,353	36.5 years	$44,900
Glenfield East	0.62	2,247	3,624	696	36.6 years	$46,800
New Zealand					38.1 years	$41,500

== Local government ==
The North Shore Highway District was the first local government body in Glenfield. Commencing operation in 1868, the district administered projects including roads from Birkenhead north to the Ōkura River. From 1876, the area was administered by the Waitemata County, a large rural county north and west of the city of Auckland. In 1961, Glenfield became a county town within the Waitemata County, led by chairman Stan Compton until his death in 1965, and later by Arthur Gibbons.

On 1 August 1974, the Waitemata County was dissolved, and Glenfield was incorporated into Takapuna City. In 1989, Glenfield was merged into the North Shore City. North Shore City was amalgamated into Auckland Council in November 2010.

Within the Auckland Council, Glenfield is a part of the Kaipātiki local government area governed by the Kaipātiki Local Board. It is a part of the North Shore ward, which elects two councillors to the Auckland Council.

== Bibliography ==
- King, R. E. (1984), Tauhinu: a History of Greenhithe, OCLC 37242212, Wikidata Q123416976
- Rounthwaite, Valerie (1989), The Story of Rural Glenfield, Takapuna: Takapuna City Council, OCLC 37482407, Wikidata Q123499466
- Taua, Te Warena (2009). "He Kohikohinga Kōrero mō Hikurangi". In Macdonald, Finlay; Kerr, Ruth (eds.). West: The History of Waitakere. Random House. pp. 23–48. ISBN 9781869790080.
- Verran, David (2010), The North Shore: An Illustrated History, North Shore: Random House, OL 33434370W, Wikidata Q120520385
