= Glenfield Mall =

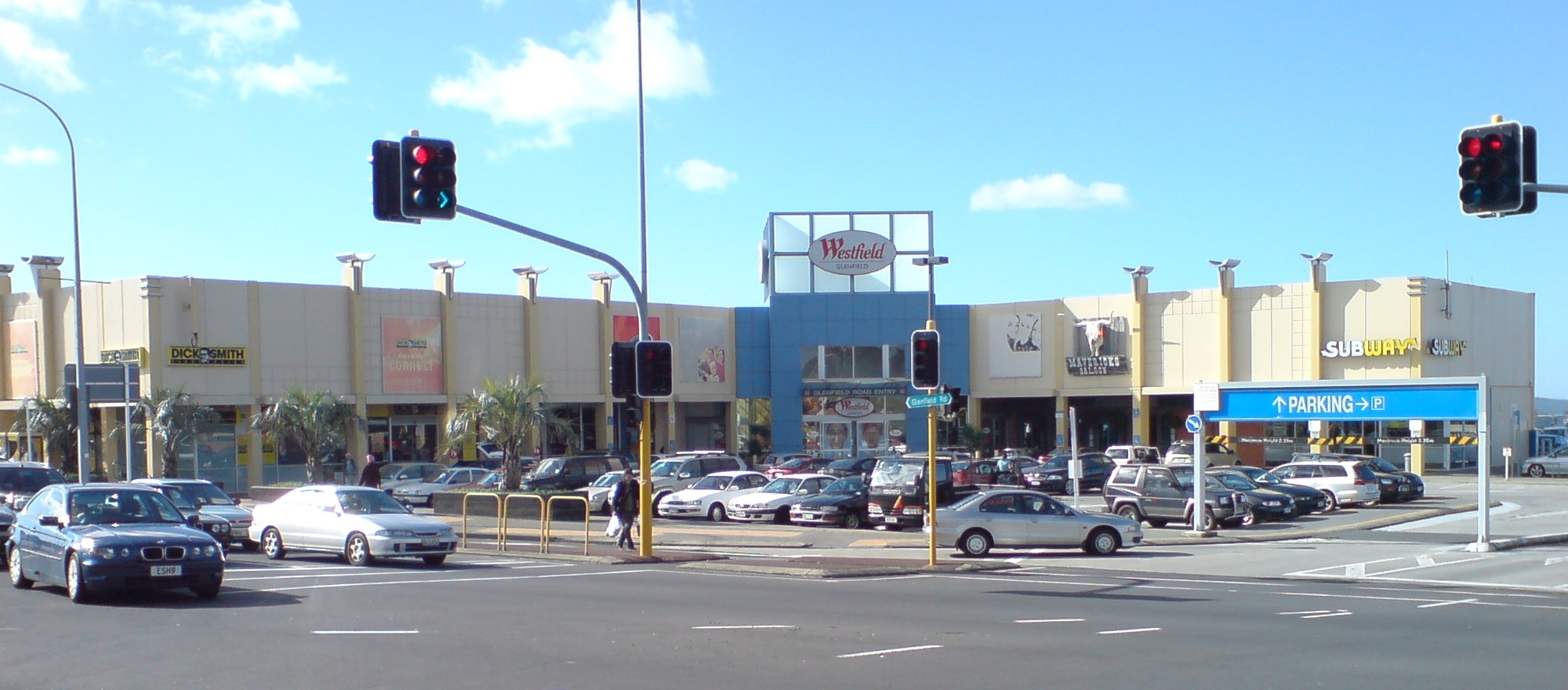
- The front top parking lot
- Location: Glenfield, New Zealand
- Coordinates: 36.782089°S 174.722282°E
- Address: Glenfield Road and Downing Street
- Opened: 8 November 1971; 55 years ago
- Owner: Ladstone Holdings Limited
- Num. of stores: 116
- Num. of anchor tenants: 4
- Floor area: 29,700 m^{2} (320,000 sq ft)
- Floors: 5
- Parking: 1,506
- Website: glenfieldmall.co.nz

Glenfield Mall is an enclosed shopping centre in the North Shore suburb of Glenfield, Auckland, New Zealand. It is situated between Glenfield Road to the west, Downing Street to the south and Bentley Avenue to the north. The centre features major retailers including Farmers, The Warehouse, Woolworths, and Briscoes Homeware. The Glenfield Night Market was formerly held in the car park on Sunday evenings.

== History ==
The mall opened on 8 November 1971 with a gross leasable area of 12,212 m^{2} (131,450 sq ft). It was extended to 17,800 m^{2} (192,000 sq ft) in 1986. A food hall and fresh food stores were added in a 1991 refurbishment of the lower level. The mall was bought by Westfield Group in May 1996 and named Westfield Glenfield. A major renovation by Westfield in 2000 cost $100 million and enlarged the mall to 29,700 m^{2}, with an increase from two levels to five levels.

In a 2008 rating of New Zealand shopping centres by a retail expert group, Westfield Glenfield received just two out of four stars, the lowest rating in the country (though not the lowest that would have been possible), based on the criteria of amount of shopping area, economic performance, amenity and appeal as well as future growth prospects. The reviewers considered that the centre was facing strong competition, including from its newer and larger sister centre Westfield Albany. The centre's management disagreed and noted that the centre remained a convenient family-focused destination.

On 30 November 2015, Scentre Group, the owner and manager of Westfield Shopping Centres, sold the mall to Ladstone Glenfield Limited, a subsidiary of Ladstone Holdings Limited. The mall was put up for sale again in September 2018.

== Cultural references ==
Glenfield Mall features in Janet Frame's Living in the Maniototo (1979), which draws in part of her experience of moving to live in Glenfield in 1975 ("which, in the novel, she would call 'Blenheim'"). Glenfield Mall appears under the fictional name of Heavenfield Mall, and also Heavenfield City:

Blenheim. The disinherited suburb-city where the largest, most impressive building is not a cathedral, a community hall, concert hall or theater, but a shopping mall planned by those who believe that the commercial architecture of North America is suitable for Blenheim: built for a climate of blizzards, intense heat, meagre daylight filtered through smog; for a city where the stars and the sun and the sky are no longer part of the human view.

== See also ==
- List of shopping centres in New Zealand
