= Southern Cross group (New Zealand) =

Southern Cross group, a collection of independent, health-oriented businesses in New Zealand, operates on not-for-profit principles and is New Zealand's largest non-public health care organisation. The Group's businesses include health insurance, private hospitals and healthcare, travel insurance and pet insurance. The Group encompasses the Southern Cross Medical Care Society and the Southern Cross Health Trust and their respective subsidiaries.

== Early history ==
According to Peter A. Smith's The Private Prescription, which chronicles the history of Southern Cross, the group's origins can be traced back to the 1950s when the New Zealand private healthcare sector became concerned that the government contribution towards hospital costs of those opting for private care was not sufficient.

The President of the New Zealand Private Hospitals’ Association, Dr Jefcoate Harbutt, began to make “serious inquiries about the formation of a New Zealand health insurance organisation”. Dr Harbutt, along with Auckland chartered accountant Don Carnachan and a group of Auckland surgeons led by Dr Warwick Macky, set about establishing the organisation that would eventually become Southern Cross Medical Care Society, which was officially founded in May 1961.

Throughout the 1960s, Southern Cross’ growth was modest, but during 1970s it grew rapidly, putting pressure on private hospitals for more beds, theatre facilities and improved equipment and care. The Society was often approached by private hospitals for loans or redevelopment projects, which prompted the directors to think about whether the Society should be in the private hospitals business or establish an arms-length entity.

In 1977 the directors decided to set up a separate charitable trust capable of managing and operating hospitals, which became the Southern Cross Hospital Trust (later renamed Southern Cross Health Trust).

== Southern Cross Medical Care Society ==
The Southern Cross Medical Care Society, trading as Southern Cross Health Society, is a friendly society and New Zealand's largest health insurer. The Health Society had 940,105 members as of October 2023, according to its 2023 annual report. This represented a 62% market share and more than 17% of New Zealand's population. The Health Society funded more than NZ$1.099b of healthcare services in the year to 30 June 2021, including 240,000 elective surgeries, or 73% of the country's health insurance claims. In the 2021 financial year, for every $1 of premium income, 87 cents was returned to members in claims for healthcare treatment. The Health Society also offers life insurance and corporate wellness programmes.

To better manage the impact of rising claims on the premiums members pay and make the claims process more seamless for members, the Health Society launched the Affiliated Provider (AP) programme in 1998. It contracts surgeons, specialists and facilities to provide members with certain procedures at agreed prices. The Society had more than 2,074 Affiliated Providers across 35 specialties in 2021.

In 2012, Southern Cross Benefits Limited acquired the pet insurance book of Ellenco Pet Insurance and re-launched the business as Southern Cross Pet Insurance in 2014. Since 2020, Southern Cross Pet Insurance has been operating under the Southern Cross Medical Care Society. As at 30 June 2017, Southern Cross Pet Insurance insured more than 21,000 cats and dogs.

== Southern Cross Health Trust ==
The Southern Cross Health Trust is a Charitable Trust and owns:

- Southern Cross Healthcare
- Southern Cross Benefits Limited (trading as Southern Cross Travel Insurance)

Southern Cross Healthcare, established in 1979, is New Zealand's largest private hospital and healthcare network, with 24 wholly owned and joint-venture facilities that provided private healthcare services to 86,000 patients in wholly owned hospitals, JV hospitals and endoscopy clinics in the year to June 2019. This includes insurance-funded, public-funded and self-paying patients. Around 1000 surgeons and anaesthetists are credentialed to practice within Southern Cross Healthcare facilities.

Southern Cross Benefits Limited, established in 1982, operates as a direct-to-consumer travel-insurance business (Southern Cross Travel Insurance) that covered around 445,000 travellers in both New Zealand and Australia in the 2017 financial year.

As a charitable trust, the Southern Cross Health Trust reinvests any surpluses it makes and partners with several charities. Its charitable activities include making its hospitals' facilities, medical supplies and theatre staff available free-of-charge for charitable surgeries; funding a free mobile dental clinic that operates in the upper North Island; and supporting the New Zealand Dental Association, Dove Hospice and cancer support group Sweet Louise.

=== Auckland hospitals ===
- Southern Cross Hospital North Harbour (36.7700676°S 174.7303662°E) in Wairau Valley has 59 beds.
- Southern Cross Auckland Surgical Centre (36.8739242°S 174.777725°E) in Remuera has 17 beds, providing surgery only.
- Southern Cross Hospital Brightside (36.8791008°S 174.7687274°E) in Epsom has 43 beds.

=== Other hospitals ===
- Southern Cross Hospital Hamilton (37.7889646°S 175.2881821°E) in Hamilton East in Hamilton has 60 beds.
- Southern Cross Hospital Rotorua (38.158313°S 176.239251°E) in Springfield, Rotorua in Rotorua District has 17 beds.
- Southern Cross Hospital New Plymouth (39.0586923°S 174.0638001°E) in New Plymouth Central, New Plymouth District has 24 beds.
- Southern Cross Hospital Wellington (41.3094629°S 174.7732074°E) in Newtown, Wellington has 37 beds, and only provides surgical services.
- Southern Cross Hospital Christchurch (43.5202485°S 172.6329178°E) in Christchurch Central, Christchurch has 86 beds.
- Southern Cross Hospital Invercargill (46.407077°S 168.353568°E) in Invercargill Central, Invercargill has 26 beds.
