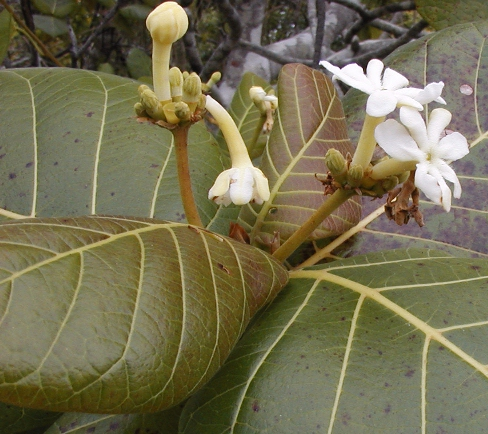

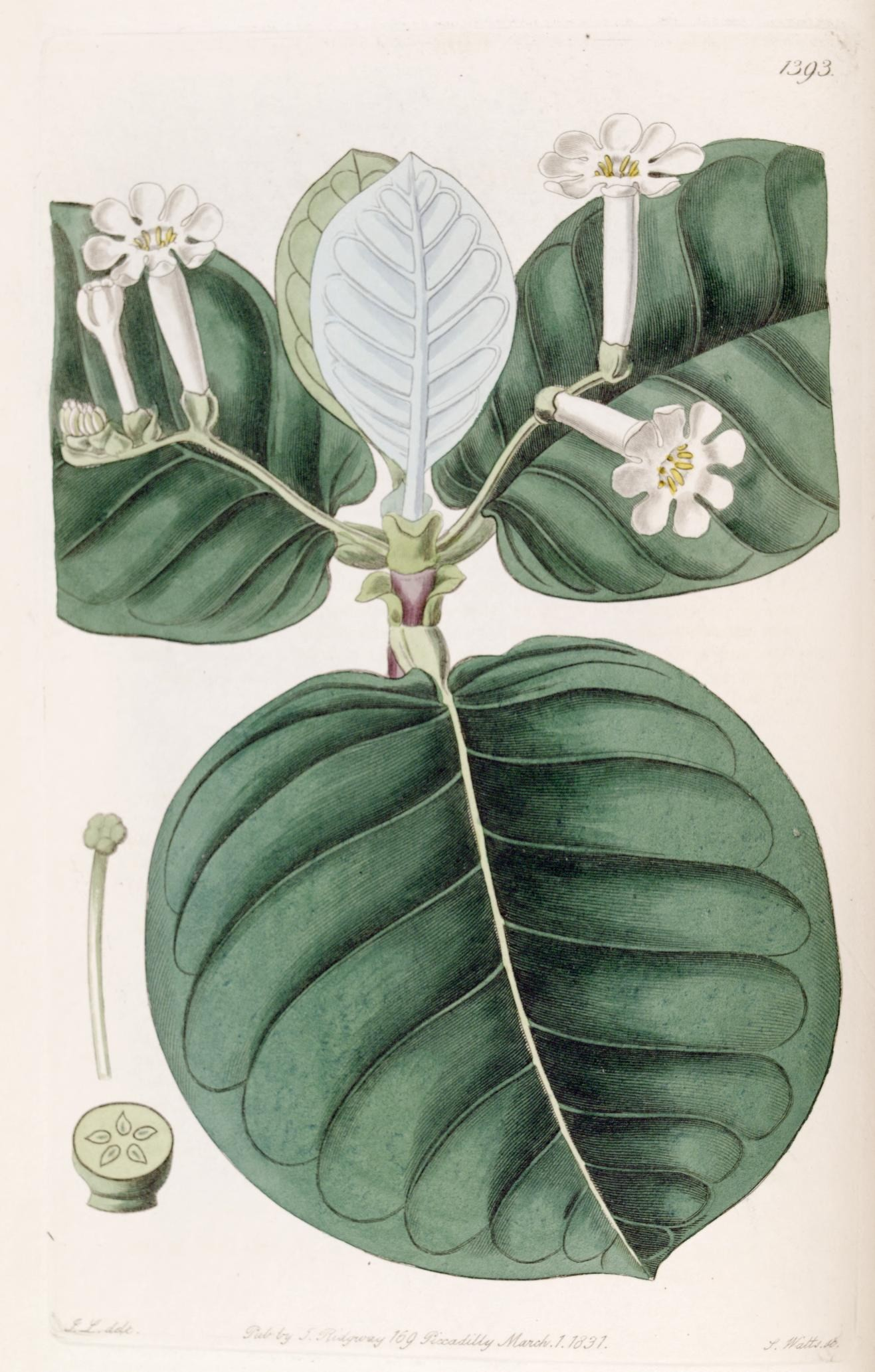
- Guettarda speciosa (artist John Lindley)

Conservation status
- Least Concern (IUCN 3.1)

Scientific classification
- Kingdom: Plantae
- Clade: Tracheophytes
- Clade: Angiosperms
- Clade: Eudicots
- Clade: Asterids
- Order: Gentianales
- Family: Rubiaceae
- Genus: Guettarda
- Species: G. speciosa

Binomial name
- Guettarda speciosa L.
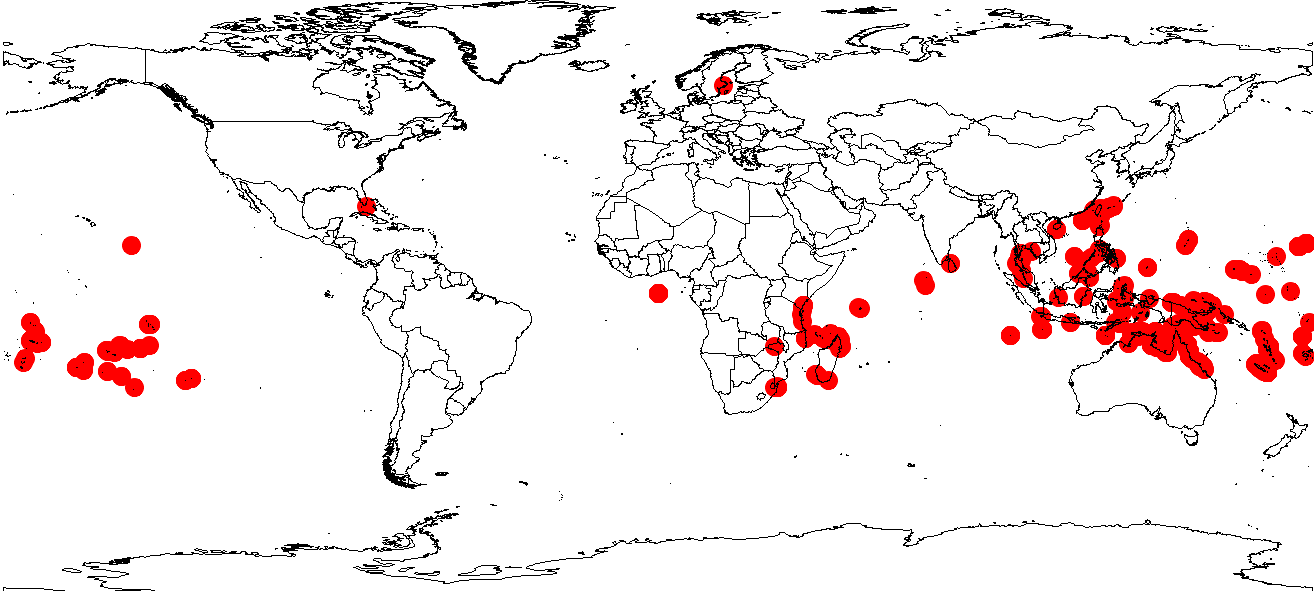
- Occurrence data from GBIF

= Guettarda speciosa =

Species of flowering plant

Guettarda speciosa, with common names sea randia, or zebra wood, is a species of shrub in the family Rubiaceae found in coastal habitats in tropical areas around the Pacific Ocean, including the coastline of central and northern Queensland and Northern Territory in Australia, and Pacific Islands, including Micronesia, French Polynesia and Fiji, Malaysia and Indonesia, Maldives and the east coast of Africa. It reaches 6 m in height, has fragrant white flowers, and large green prominently-veined leaves. It grows in sand above the high tide mark.

== Taxonomy and naming ==
Guettarda speciosa was originally described by Carl Linnaeus in volume two of his Species Plantarum in 1753, citing Java as its origin. The genus was named in honour of the 18th century French naturalist Jean-Étienne Guettard, while the specific epithet is derived from the Latin speciosus 'showy'. It is the type species of the genus. Its closest relatives are all native to the neotropics, yet it has dispersed widely across tropical habitats worldwide.

Alternate names in the Cook Islands include Ano, Hano, Fano, and Puapua. The last is also used in Samoa, and the similar Puopua in Tonga; New Zealand however uses the term for the Clematis paniculata. It is known as utilomar [wudˠiːlʲɔːmʲɑrˠ] in the Marshall Islands.

== Description ==
It is a perennial shrub or small tree 2–6 m (7–20 ft) tall by 1–3 m (3.5–10 ft) wide with smooth creamy grey bark. The large oval-shaped leaves are 15–23 cm (6–9 in) long by 10–18 cm (4–7 in) wide. Dark green and smooth above with prominent paler veins, they are finely hairy underneath. Flowering is from October to May, the fragrant white flowers are 2.5–3 cm (1–1 1/4 in) long with 4–9 lobes. These are followed by sweet-smelling globular hard fruit, measuring 2.5 cm–2.8 cm × 2.2 cm–2.5 cm (0.98 in–1.10 in × 0.87 in–0.98 in), which mature September to March.

== Distribution and habitat ==
Guettarda speciosa is found in coastal habitats in tropical areas around the Pacific Ocean, including the coastline of central and northern Queensland and Northern Territory in Australia, and Pacific Islands, including Micronesia, French Polynesia and Fiji, Malaysia and Indonesia, Maldives and the east coast of Africa. As its name suggests, the beach gardenia grows on beaches and sandy places above the high tide level.

== Ecology ==
The timing of the flowers' opening at night suggests they are pollinated by moths.

On Christmas Island, the Christmas white-eye (Zosterops natalis) visits the flowers, while the Christmas Island red crab (Gecarcoidea natalis) eat the fallen fruit. The Mariana Fruit Bat (Pteropus mariannus) feeds on the fruit and flowers, acting as a vector for the dispersal of seeds.

== Human use ==
=== Use by indigenous cultures ===
The large leaves were used in various ways by the indigenous people of northern Australia; they could hold food, and when heated, they were given to relieve headaches and aches in limbs. The stems could be used to make Macassan pipes. The flowers were used to scent coconut oil on the Cook Islands, and the wood for dwellings and canoes. Amongst the Marshallese people of Kwajalein, the plant is regarded as possessing spiritual power.

=== Cultivation ===
A very useful plant for seaside planting in tropical climates, Guettarda speciosa needs a sunny aspect and well-drained soil. It has proven difficult to propagate, as this must be done by seed which may take months to germinate.
