= Southern Cross Hospital North Harbour =

- Southern Cross Healthcare Group

Geography
- Location: Glenfield, Auckland, New Zealand
- Coordinates: 36.77024°S 174.73253°E

History
- Opened: 1991

Links
- Website: hospitals.southerncross.co.nz
- Lists: Hospitals in New Zealand

Southern Cross Hospital North Harbour is the only private surgical in-patient hospital on Auckland's North Shore, New Zealand. It is run by Southern Cross Hospitals Limited, part of the Southern Cross Healthcare Group, and was established in 1991. It is on Wairau Road in the suburb of Glenfield.

The facility undertakes around 6,000 operations annually.
