= Southern Cross Auckland Surgical Centre =

- Southern Cross
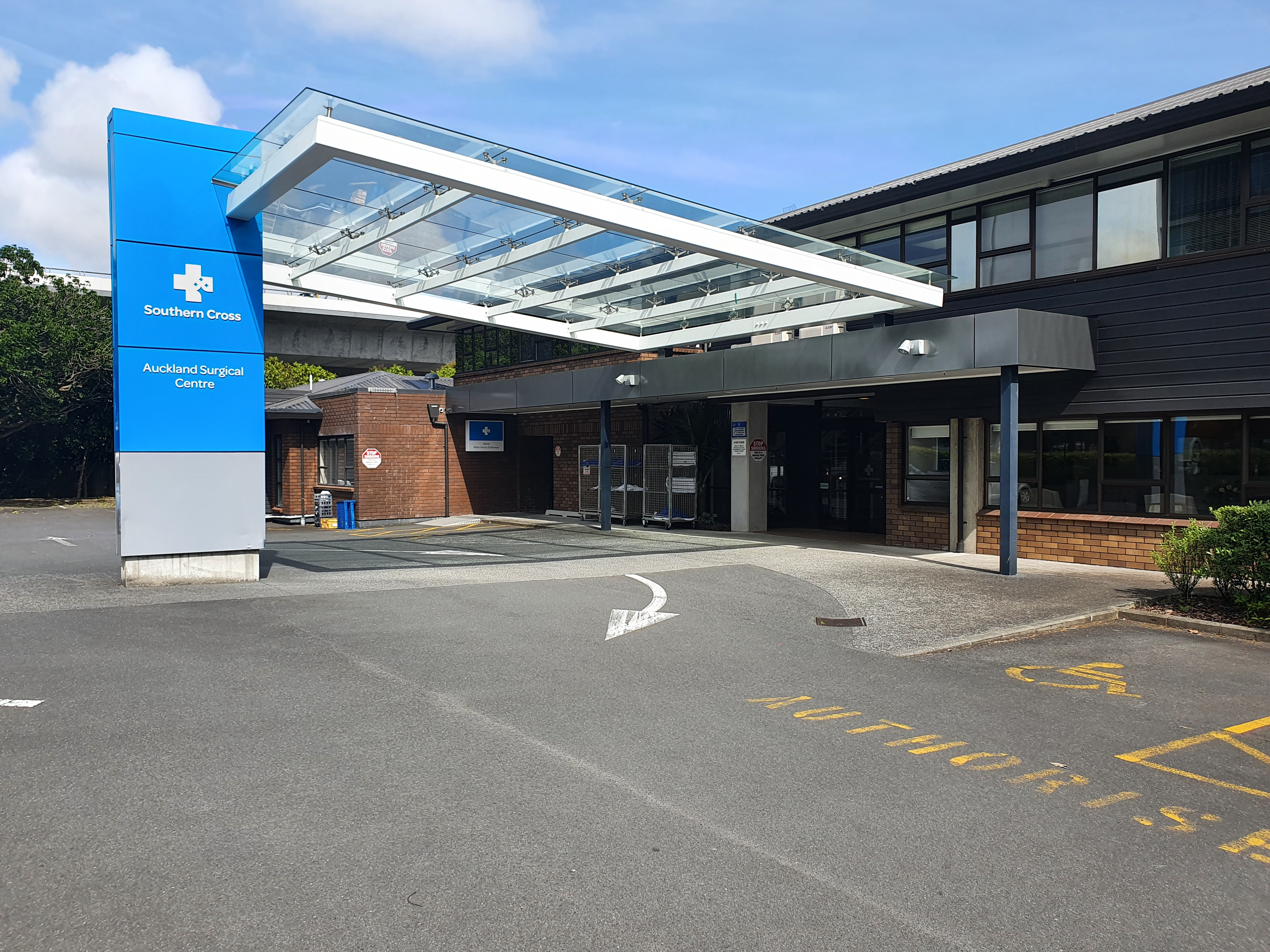

Geography
- Location: Remuera, Auckland, New Zealand
- Coordinates: 36.873692°S 174.779662°E

History
- Opened: 1987

Links
- Website: hospitals.southerncross.co.nz
- Lists: Hospitals in New Zealand

Southern Cross Auckland Surgical Centre is a private day-stay hospital in Remuera, Auckland, New Zealand. It is run by the Southern Cross group. It was established as a private hospital in 1987 (New Zealand's first facility purpose-built for such a use) and was taken over by Southern Cross in 2005.

It has 4 operating theatres, two recovery rooms and a 10-bed overnight stay facility. It employs around 90 staff and services 6,000 patients a year. Several specialists also have consultation rooms at the centre.
