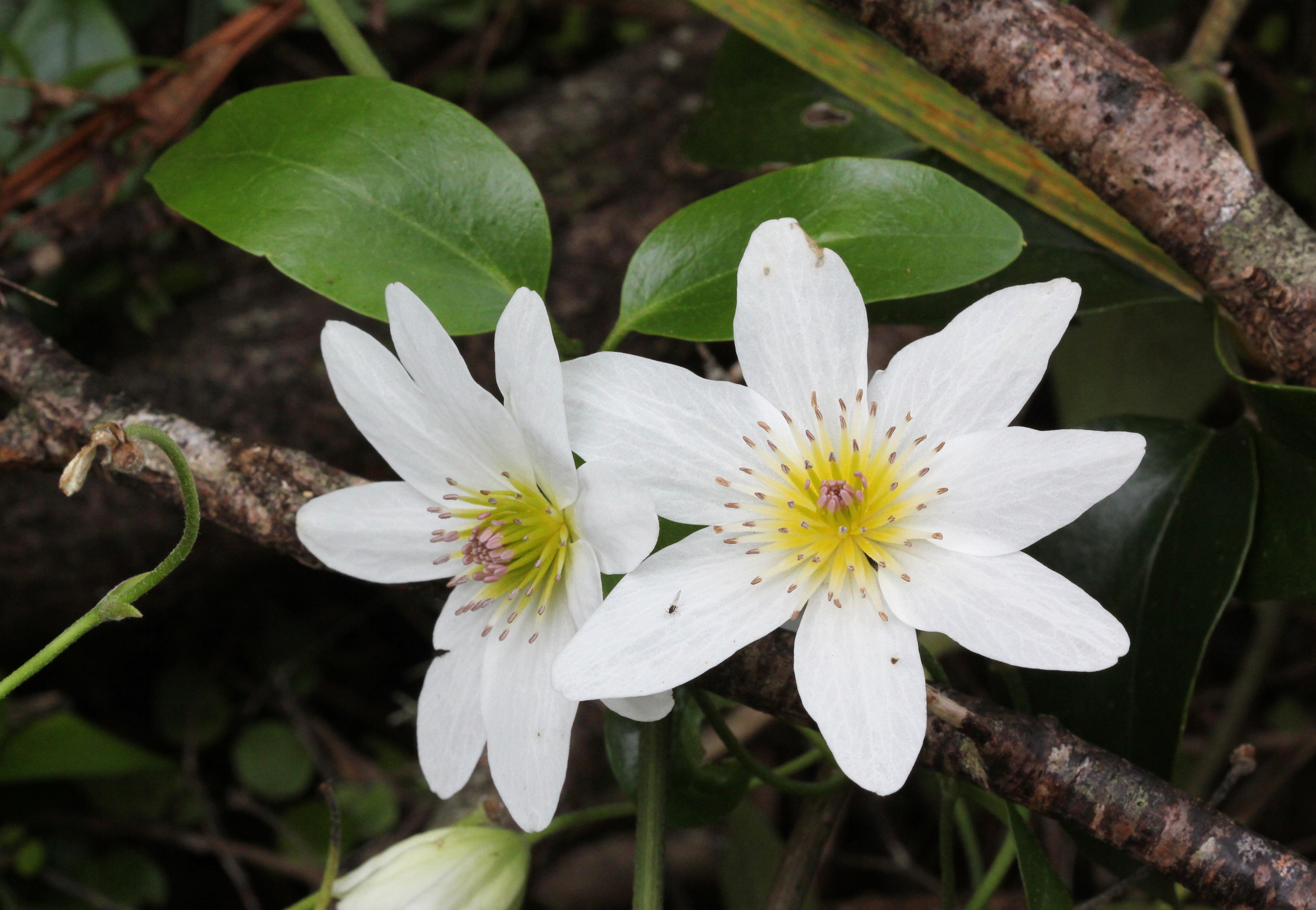

Scientific classification
- Kingdom: Plantae
- Clade: Tracheophytes
- Clade: Angiosperms
- Clade: Eudicots
- Order: Ranunculales
- Family: Ranunculaceae
- Genus: Clematis
- Species: C. paniculata

Binomial name
- Clematis paniculata J.F.Gmel.

Synonyms
- Clematis indivisa Willd.; Clematis indivisa var. lobata Hook.; Clematis integrifolia Forst. fil.

= Clematis paniculata =

Species of flowering plant endemic to New Zealand

Clematis paniculata (Māori: puawānanga or puapua) is a species of flowering plant in the buttercup family Ranunculaceae. It is one of seven species of clematis native to New Zealand. C. paniculata is the most common of these, and is widespread in forests throughout the country.

Growing from lowland areas up to low mountainous forests, it flowers between August and November.

The Māori name puawānanga translates as "flower of the skies", and traditionally its flowering meant the start of spring. Puapua on the other hand comes from reduplication of the Polynesian term pua referring to either Fagraea berteroana, Guettarda speciosa or Gardenia taitensis.

== Description ==
Clematis paniculata is an evergreen woody high-climbing vine. It has a woody stem that is usually around 10 cm or more in diameter at the base. The leaves are dark and globous, sparsely hairy beneath. They have stout branchlets. They have a leaf margin of toothed, entire or lobed near apex, though they are rarely ever profoundly lobed. The C. paniculata leaflets' texture is similar to leather meaning that you can see pores and wrinkles. The leaves are shiny and tough looking. The leaves have the shape of broadly ovate to broad oblong and heart-shaped to truncate at the base.

C. paniculata is a unisex plant though the male and female flowers are similar as both have six sepals, with white flowers lobed. But, the female flower has a smaller sepal than the male. They both have white sepals that are narrow towards the end, rectangular or rounded end. Females have few staminodes and males have lots. Females do not have persistent fruits. The female has hairy achenes that are 2–4 millimetres (0.079–0.157 in) long.

== Range ==
Clematis paniculata is native to New Zealand. It was naturalised on the Chatham Islands and can be found throughout North, South and Stewart Island.

== Habitat ==
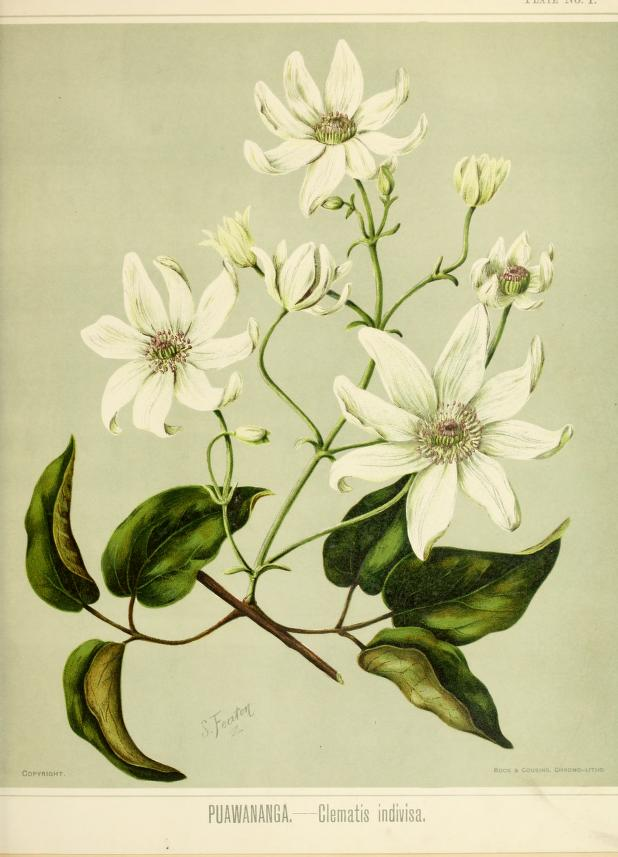
Illustration of C. paniculata by Sarah Featon.

C. paniculata is found throughout New Zealand in lowland and subalpine forests. Coastal to land between 300 and 800 meters above sea level in tall forest or shrubland.

== Ecology ==
=== Life cycle/phenology ===
Clematis paniculata flowers from August to November and has fruit throughout October to January. These flowers are unisexual, which means that there are both female and male flowers. The difference between male and female flowers is that the male has a stamen, this is the male organ which bears pollen for the reproduction of the plant. The seeds are easily dispersed by wind and they are contained in a silky feather-like cluster. The germination period is within 2–3 months, but this can be erratic.

=== Soil requirements ===
Clematis paniculata prefers soils that are damp but not overly soaking and if the roots become dried out the plant will not survive. This plant prefers not overly wet, but can't be too dry.

Clematis is found in lowland areas; therefore, it is most likely to be located in locations with brown soil as brown soil is the most common soil in New Zealand. It extends all over the mountains and into the moist lowlands. In the northern North Island, it will most likely be found in granular soil which is a volcanic material that has been derived from substantial weathering. It is found in areas where summer dryness is uncommon and soil that does not become waterlogged in the winter.

C. paniculata prefers sunny areas as the vine will grow up other trees to be able to reach the sunlight. Though it does not thrive in humid climates as it becomes prone to powdery mildew.

=== Predators, parasites, and diseases ===
Clematis paniculata is one of the favourite plants for the honey bee to pollinate.

==== Rusts ====
There are four kinds of endemic rusts that affect C. paniculata in New Zealand, and Aecidium otagense is one of these. A. otagense is the most detrimental to the plant because it is the only kind of rust that can cause deformities in the flowers, leaves and stem. The deformities that the rust causes to the flower and stem are described as spectacular. Another particularly interesting kind of rust that affects C. paniculata is Puccinia alboclava because it only affects the C. paniculata and no other kind of Clematis species. P. alboclava is found in the soft leaves of the C. paniculata species seedling. It is only found to infect C. paniculata in Dunedin and the centre of the North Island The rust produces colourless teleutospore on the host. This is extremely rare kind of rust and appears to be the first to do this on a clematis species.

==== Virus ====
Cucumber mosaic virus is a virus that has been infecting the C. paniculata plants in the lowland forests near Dunedin. The virus has been associated with a dramatic decrease in the number of individual C. paniculata. It is so lethal to C. paniculata because it is not only able to infect the plant, but it also infects the trees that support it. The virus causes localised lesions, chlorotic spots rings and ringspot lesions, necrosis, premature leaf fall and leaf distortion in the plant. It is transferred from plant to plant by aphids; aphids move it through different ways. One way is the virions can be kept in an infectious state for the amount of time it takes for the aphid to go and give it to a plant that has not been infected yet. Aphids can infect to multiple (39) uninfected plants within 10 minutes after being in contact with an infected plant. This is what makes Cucumber mosaic virus so detrimental to crops, as the aphid can quickly and easily spread it from one plant to another.

== Cultural uses ==
Clematis paniculata or known in Te Reo as Puawananga is very important to the Māori community as it has great cultural significance. Many tribes believe that Puawananga, along with the Whauwhapaku, are the offspring of Puanga (Rigel) which is the brightest star of the Orion constellation and Rehua (Antares) the most shining star of the Scorpio constellation. The rising of these two stars in the morning signals the approach of summer, and the time between the two events from June to November happens at the same time as when the Puawananga flowers bloom. They also use the flowering of the plant as an indicator as that the season of spring has started and that the eels have started to migrate up the rivers to spawn therefore it was time to harvest them as this is a spring event, so the two events of the flowering and eel migrating coincided. The woman would also use the Puawananga to make decorative pieces for wreaths and garlands they would make for their hair.

There are also records of the past Māori ancestors using Puawananga for medical purposes. Females would use it for multiple things such as general blood disorders, skin eruptions, kidney troubles, haemorrhages and bleeding piles. They would use the leaves to produce blisters as a counter-irritant and the sap to help heal wounds. Puawananga was only taken by women. They would take it three times daily before meals.

== No similar taxa ==
Something unique about the Clematis paniculata is that there are no similar taxa to it in New Zealand whether it is endemic, native or an exotic species there is nothing else like the dark green colour of the leaves. The leathery texture with an entire margin and the unique white flowers. It is the only species that fit these categories in New Zealand, which is what makes it so unique and special, along with being a native plant.

== Gallery ==
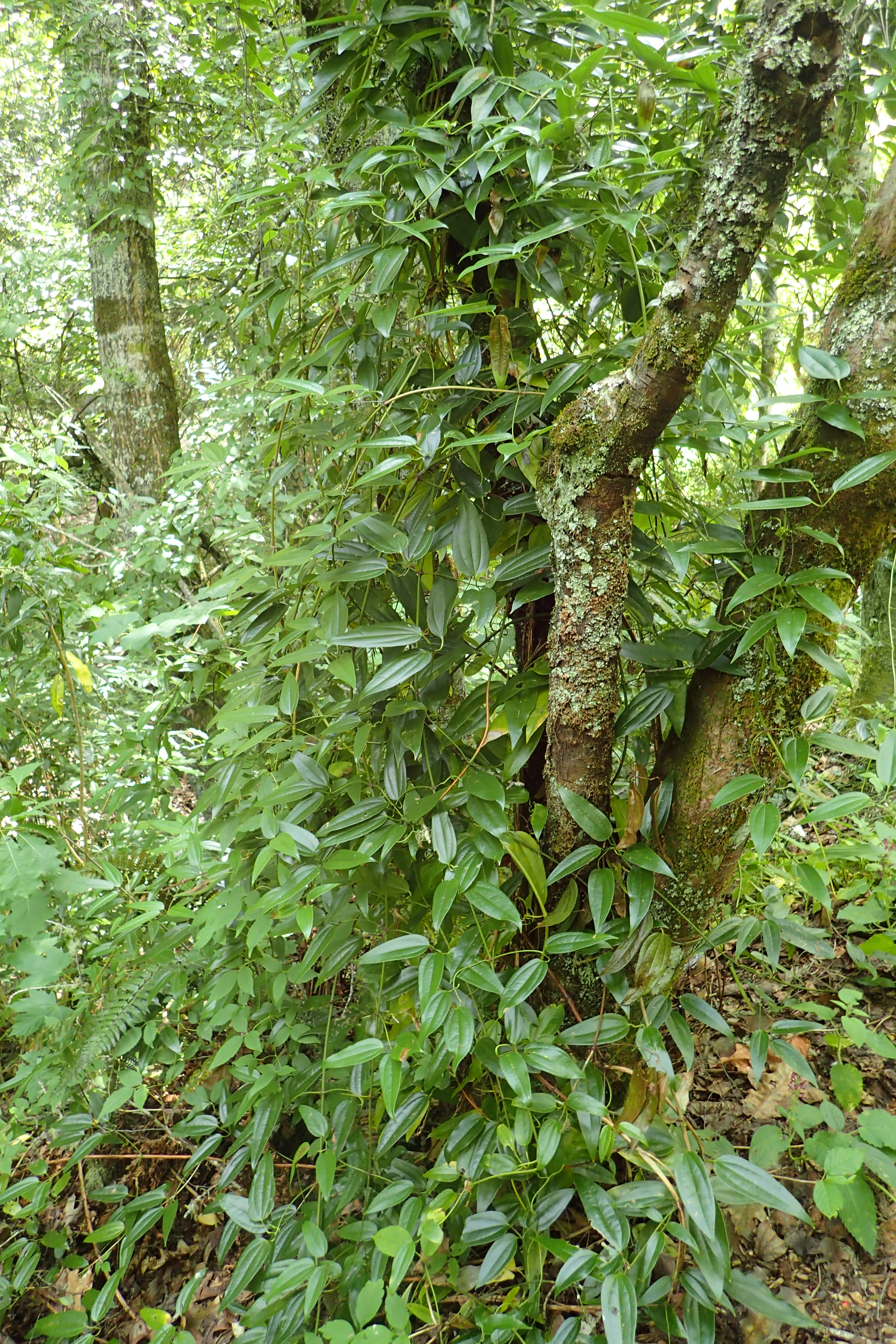

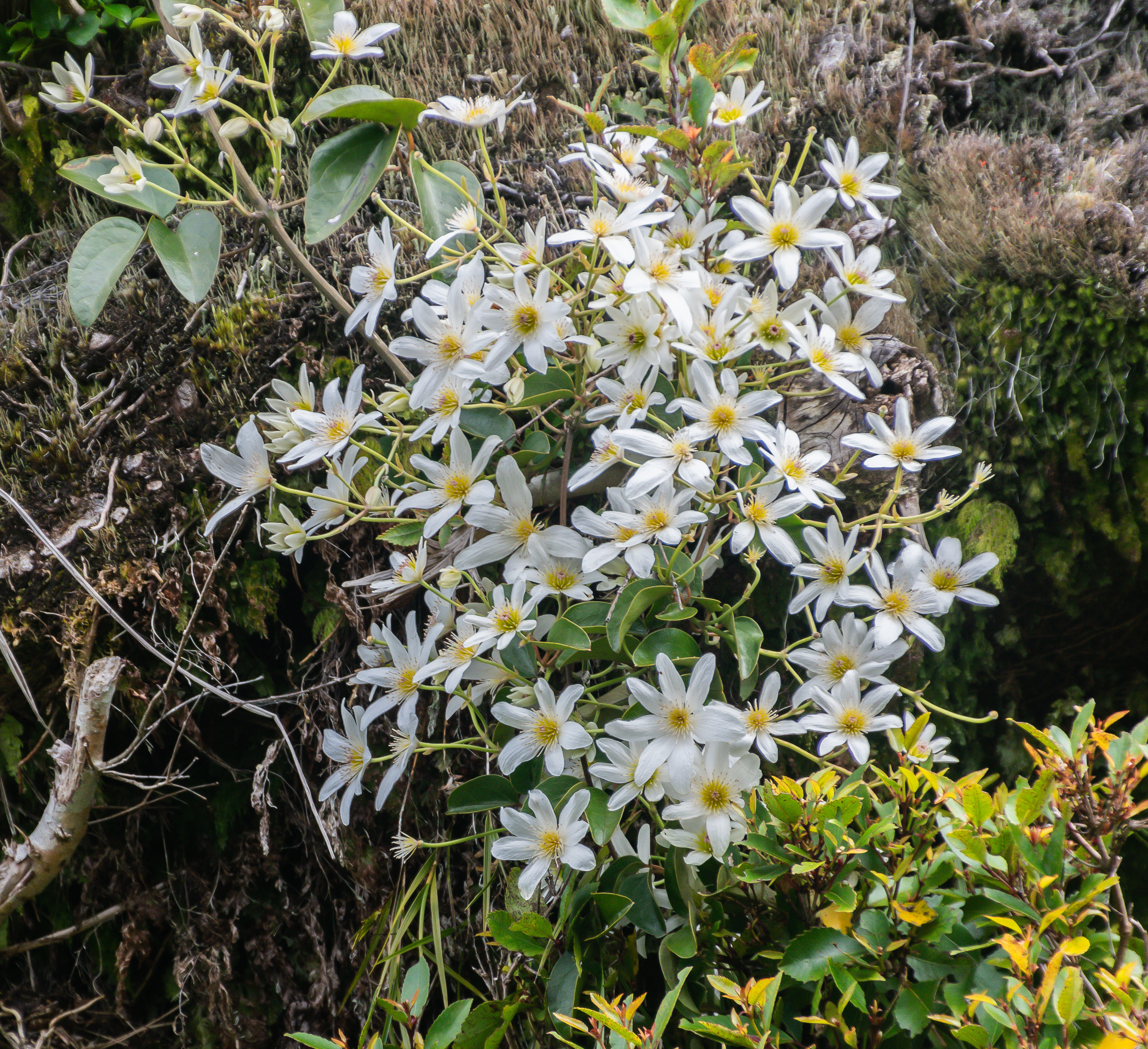

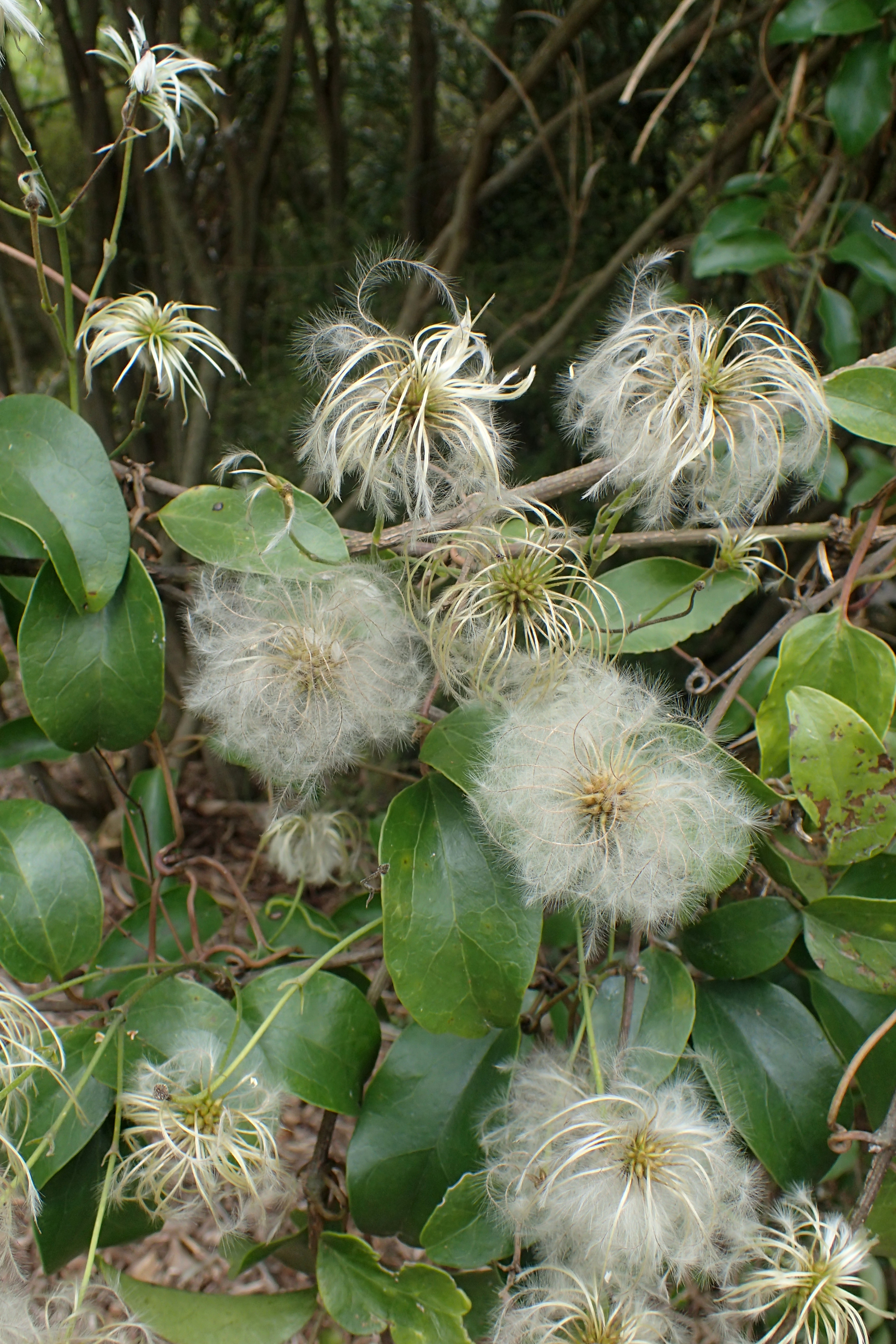

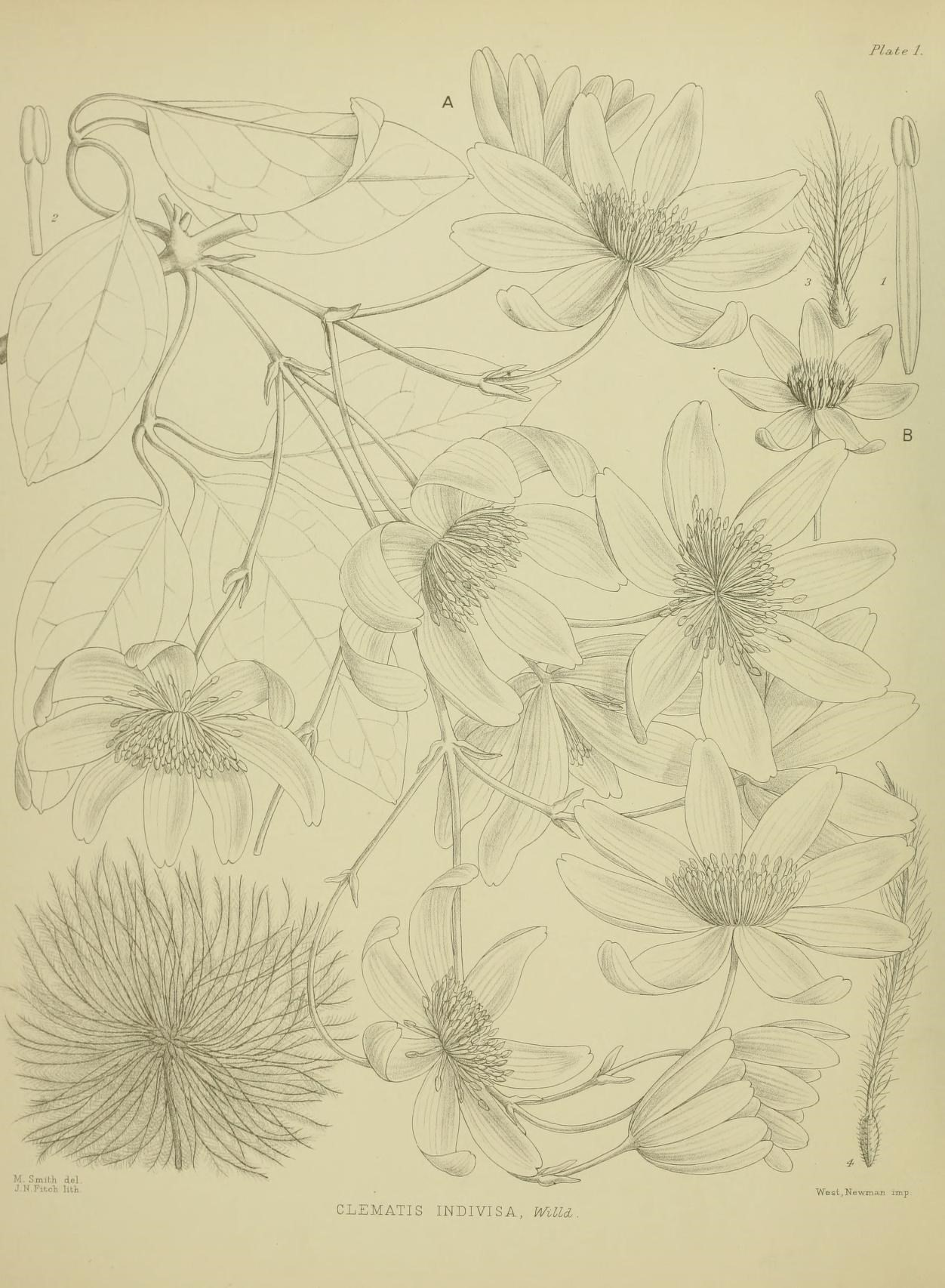
