= Mayfield, Canterbury =

Settlement in Canterbury Region, New Zealand

Mayfield
- Locality
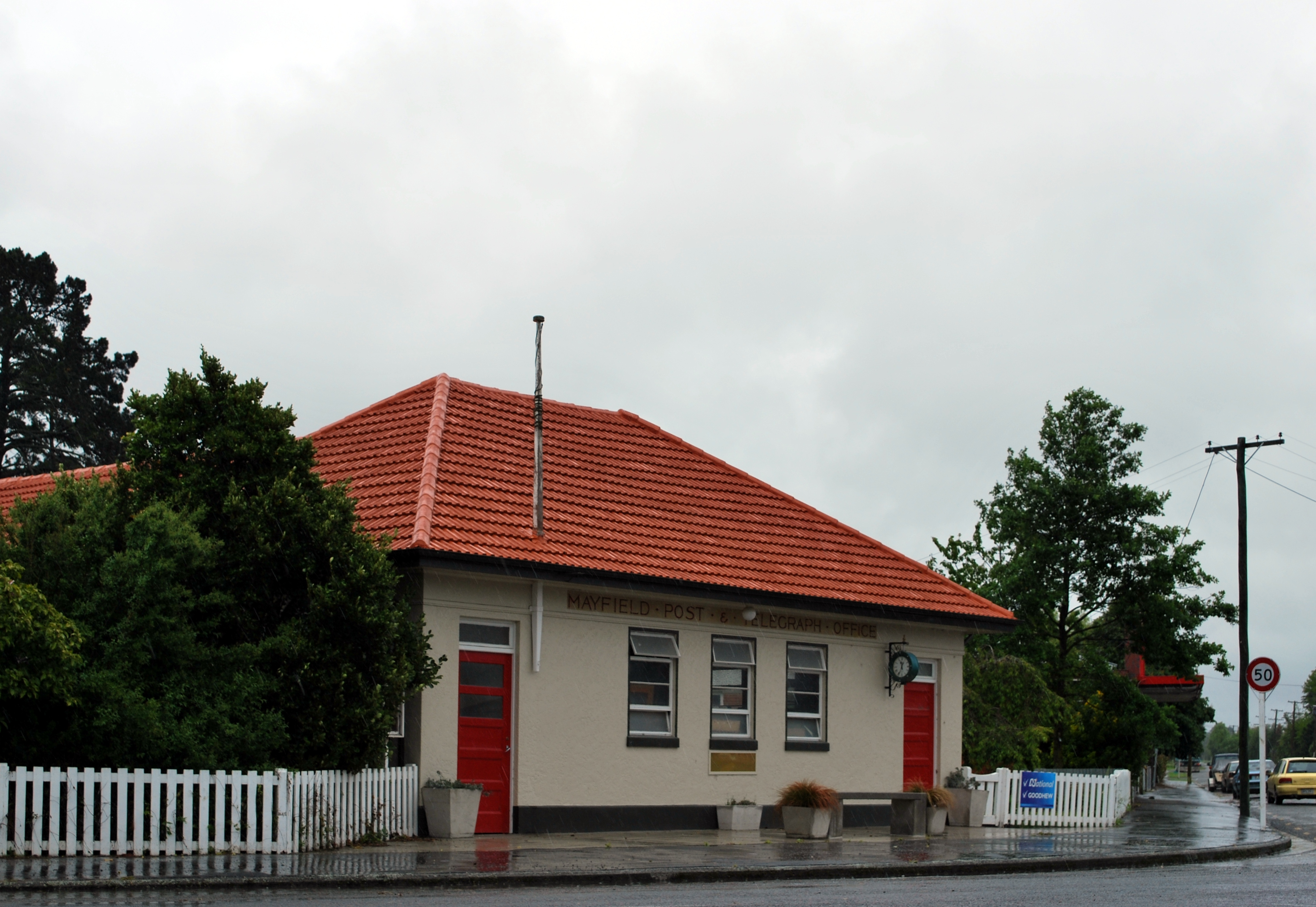
- Post office
- Interactive map of Mayfield
- Coordinates: 43°49′S 171°25′E
- Country: New Zealand
- Region: Canterbury
- Territorial authority: Ashburton District
- Ward: Western
- Electorates: Rangitata; Te Tai Tonga (Māori)

Government
  - Territorial authority: Ashburton District Council
  - Regional council: Environment Canterbury
  - Mayor of Ashburton: Liz McMillan
  - Rangitata MP: James Meager
  - Te Tai Tonga MP: Tākuta Ferris

Area
  - Total: 30.37 km^{2} (11.73 sq mi)

Population (2023 census)
  - Total: 216
  - Density: 7.11/km^{2} (18.4/sq mi)

Mayfield is a small farming settlement in Mid Canterbury, in New Zealand's South Island. It is located 35 km from Ashburton on former State Highway 72 at the intersection of the Lismore-Mayfield Road towards the top of the Canterbury Plains. Mayfield is within the Ashburton District Council and Canterbury Regional Council boundaries. The population of the Mayfield village is around 200. The majority of the population is engaged either directly or indirectly in farming or farming related services.

== Facilities ==
The village has a shop, garage, tavern, local transport company and rural supply store. The Mayfield domain features rugby fields, tennis and squash courts, outdoor swimming pool, rifle range, play centre, adventure playground and memorial hall.

The town has a voluntary rural fire brigade staffed by locals. The brigade uses an Isuzu tanker and 4x4 Isuzu fire appliance. The fire brigade is particularly useful since the climate and local farms are particularly prone to drought and grass fires during the summer season.

The first post office in Mayfield was established on 1 September 1879 when Mr. John Bowick was appointed Postmaster, he was also the town blacksmith and it was his house on the Mayfield-Klondike road that was the first Post Office. He was later bought out on 1 July 1881 by Mr. James Dellow, who became the local blacksmith. But it was only in mid-1889 that a post office with telegraph office and bureau was opened. The Mayfield post Office was in use from this time until it was downgraded to a volunteer Post office in 1982. Several local ladies held the position of volunteer Postmistress thereafter until the postal services were shifted to the local store.

James Dellow is considered by some to be the founder of Mayfield. He invented the heavier, more robust farming gear needed to handle the stony conditions of Mayfield and lived to see Mayfield grow from one or two houses to a settlement.

The local store burnt down in early 2008 but re-opened in early 2009.

The Mayfield Agricultural and Pastoral show takes place on the second Saturday in March each year.

In June 2006 Mayfield and the Mid Canterbury region were hit by large snowfalls disrupting power, phone and roads. Power remained cut for hundreds of households more than a week after the event making it one of the worst storms to hit the region in several decades.

A local newsletter the Mayfield Message is issued monthly and sent via the New Zealand Post to households in the local area and published on the Ashburton District Council website.

== Demographics ==
Mayfield locality covers 30.37 km^{2} (11.73 sq mi). It is part of the Ashburton Forks statistical area.

Historical population
Year	Pop.	±% p.a.
2006	174	—
2013	183	+0.72%
2018	180	−0.33%
2023	216	+3.71%

Mayfield had a population of 216 in the 2023 New Zealand census, an increase of 36 people (20.0%) since the 2018 census, and an increase of 33 people (18.0%) since the 2013 census. There were 123 males, 90 females, and 3 people of other genders in 78 dwellings. 2.8% of people identified as LGBTIQ+. The median age was 35.7 years (compared with 38.1 years nationally). There were 54 people (25.0%) aged under 15 years, 36 (16.7%) aged 15 to 29, 99 (45.8%) aged 30 to 64, and 24 (11.1%) aged 65 or older.

People could identify as more than one ethnicity. The results were 94.4% European (Pākehā), 13.9% Māori, 1.4% Pasifika, 2.8% Asian, and 2.8% other, which includes people giving their ethnicity as "New Zealander". English was spoken by 95.8%, Māori by 2.8%, and other languages by 4.2%. No language could be spoken by 4.2% (e.g. too young to talk). The percentage of people born overseas was 9.7, compared with 28.8% nationally.

Religious affiliations were 20.8% Christian, and 1.4% other religions. People who answered that they had no religion were 69.4%, and 6.9% of people did not answer the census question.

Of those at least 15 years old, 15 (9.3%) people had a bachelor's or higher degree, 108 (66.7%) had a post-high school certificate or diploma, and 39 (24.1%) people exclusively held high school qualifications. The median income was $48,600, compared with $41,500 nationally. 18 people (11.1%) earned over $100,000 compared to 12.1% nationally. The employment status of those at least 15 was 99 (61.1%) full-time, 24 (14.8%) part-time, and 3 (1.9%) unemployed.

== Communications ==
Mayfield has a Chorus owned telephone exchange providing Telephone and DSL services to the local area. The exchange is only capable of providing ADSL 1 services and the equipment is limited by its backhaul capabilities. It is also serviced by the Electricity Ashburton and Vodafone fibre optic networks which pass through the town. Mayfield is also serviced by the Wireless Rural Broadband Initiative and the privately operated Ruralnet.

== Education ==
Mayfield is the location of a primary school that services the township and surrounding community. The school was opened in 1887. Anama (1902–1987), Montalto (1923–1988} and Ruapuna (1887–1993) schools closed and their students moved to Mayfield School. In 2000 the school was increased in size when the smaller schools at Lismore (opened 1882) and Westerfield (opened 1888) were closed. Students at these schools transferred to Mayfield. Two relocatable classrooms from Lismore were moved to Mayfield to add two additional classrooms while another building was used to extend the library/hall. Mayfield School is a co-educational state full primary school (U2 grade) catering for New Entrants to Year 8 students with a roll of 108 (as of July 2026).

Secondary education is undertaken at Geraldine High School or Ashburton College, with school buses running from Mayfield to both schools.

== Water Supply ==
Mayfield has as reticulated water supply providing water to approximately 60 properties in the village. The water supply was originally provided from stock water by the council. In April 2009 when the council reviewed proposals to upgrade the stock water based supply to meet new standards an alternative proposal was made by the local community to source water from a bore. The community raised funding and paid for the drilling of a well in the village and the supply was switched to the bore. Subsequently, the supply was found to be insufficient to meet demand.

Properties on the Mayfield articulated water supply have suffered from a limited water supply and as of October 2016 have been placed on Level 4 water restrictions prohibiting the use of outdoor hosepipes. In May 2016 a trial project to roll out water metres was announced by the Ashburton District Council. The District Council has sourced a portable filtration system that would use stock water as a contingency.
