= Takapuna =

- Suburb
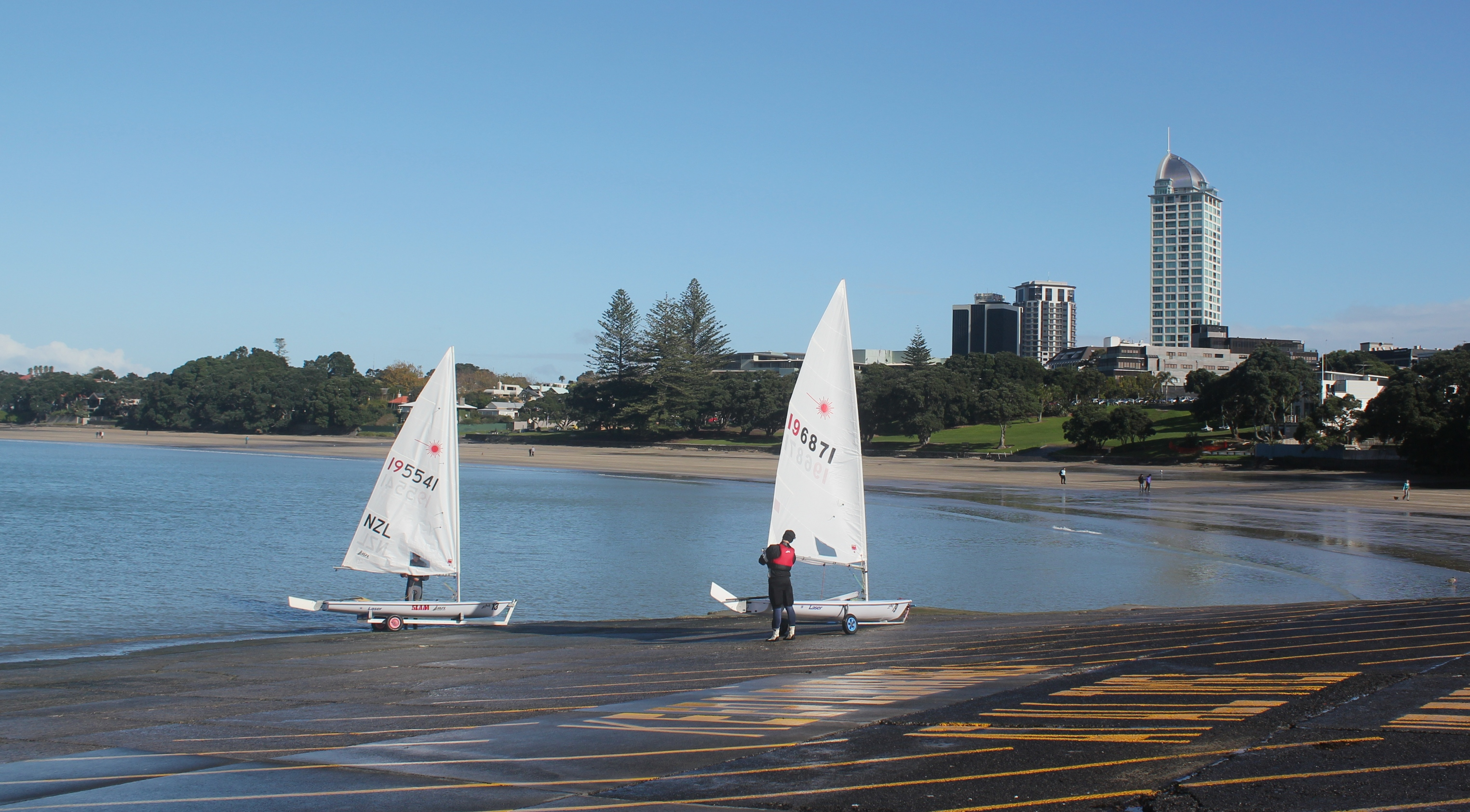
- Takapuna Beach with Takapuna visible in the background
- Interactive map of Takapuna
- Coordinates: 36.787°S 174.772°E
- Country: New Zealand
- City: Auckland
- Local authority: Auckland Council
- Electoral ward: North Shore ward
- Local board: Devonport-Takapuna Local Board
- Established: 1847

Area
  - Land: 455 ha (1,120 acres)

Population (June 2025)
  - Total: 11,930
  - Density: 2,620/km^{2} (6,790/sq mi)
- Postcode: 0622
- Busway stations: Smales Farm busway station
- Hospitals: North Shore Hospital

Wairau Valley	Milford	(Hauraki Gulf)
Hillcrest	Takapuna	(Hauraki Gulf)
Northcote	(Shoal Bay)	Hauraki

Takapuna is a suburb located on the North Shore of Auckland, New Zealand. The suburb is an isthmus between Shoal Bay, arm of the Waitematā Harbour, and the Hauraki Gulf. Lake Pupuke, a volcanic maar and one of the oldest features of the Auckland volcanic field, is a freshwater lake located in the suburb.

Takapuna was settled by Tāmaki Māori in the 13th or 14th centuries, who utilised the resources of Lake Pupuke, and a pōhutukawa grove called Te Uru Tapu. The grove still exists to this day and was an important location for funeral ceremonies. In 1847, the first European farmers settled at Takapuna, and the Crown gifted land at Takapuna to Ngāpuhi chief Eruera Maihi Patuone in order to create a protective barrier for Auckland. Jean-Baptiste Pompallier established St Mary's College at Takapuna in 1849.

The area became a popular tourist destination for wealthy families of Auckland in the 1880s, when many large summer residences were being constructed on the shores of Lake Pupuke. By the early 20th century, Takapuna Beach had grown in importance for tourists. The suburb developed in the 1910s due to a private tramway, and by the 1930s gradually became a commercial centre for the North Shore. Takapuna grew in importance after the opening of the Auckland Harbour Bridge in 1959, becoming the administrative centre for the North Shore.

== Etymology ==
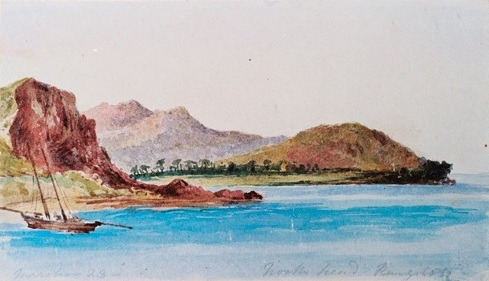
Takapuna was originally the name of a spring on the southwestern slopes of Maungauika / North Head at Torpedo Bay (watercolour by Caroline Harriet Abraham in the 1850s).

The name Takapuna refers to a spring at Maungauika / North Head, located north of Torpedo Bay Navy Museum in Devonport. The name was given by Hoturoa of the Tainui migratory waka. When the waka stopped at Torpedo Bay, Hoturoa and the crew of the Tainui met the residents of the area and drank from the spring. Hoturoa named the spring in remembrance of a spring in his homeland of Hawaiki (Mangaia). While the word puna in Māori refers to natural springs, the meaning of taka in this context is unknown, and the name has variously been interpreted to mean "Knoll Spring", "Rock Spring", "Cliff Spring" or "Falling Spring".

Over time, Tāmaki Māori began to refer to the wider area around Maungauika / North Head and the North Shore as Takapuna. Jules Dumont d'Urville, an early explorer, was the first European to adopt the name to describe the area north of North Head in 1833. During the early colonial era of Auckland, the name was used for the Parish of Takapuna, and modern Lake Pupuke was referred to as Lake Takapuna from the 1860s until the 1940s.

The area was known as the Lake District from 1866 until 1882, when the name Takapuna was formally adopted. The name Takapuna was gradually adopted to mean the settlement focused on the southern shores of Lake Pupuke over the 19th century. The areas to the south were known as Devonport, meaning Takapuna had become geographically separated from its namesake.

== Geology ==
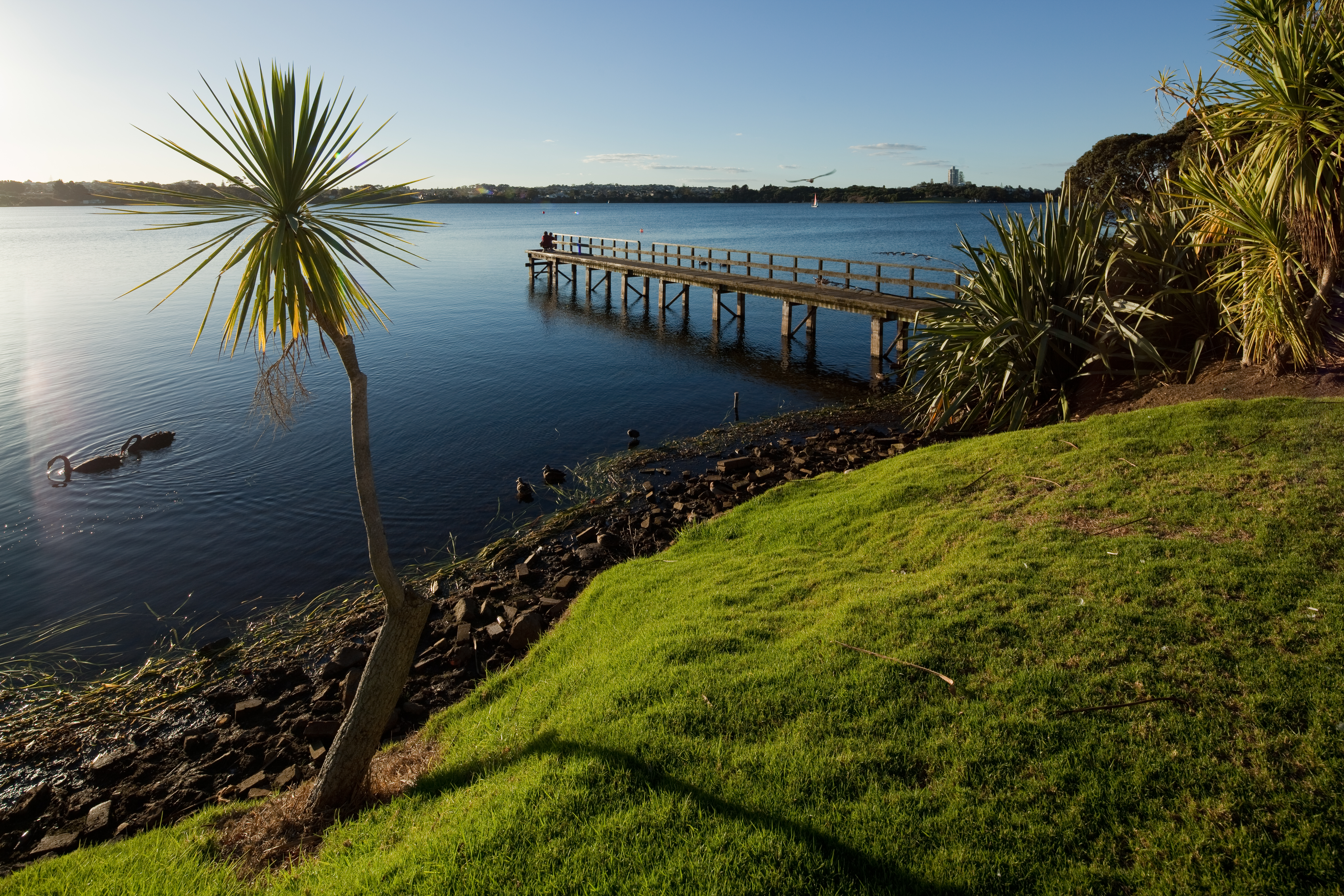
Lake Pupuke is a volcanic maar located in Takapuna, and one of the oldest known features of the Auckland volcanic field

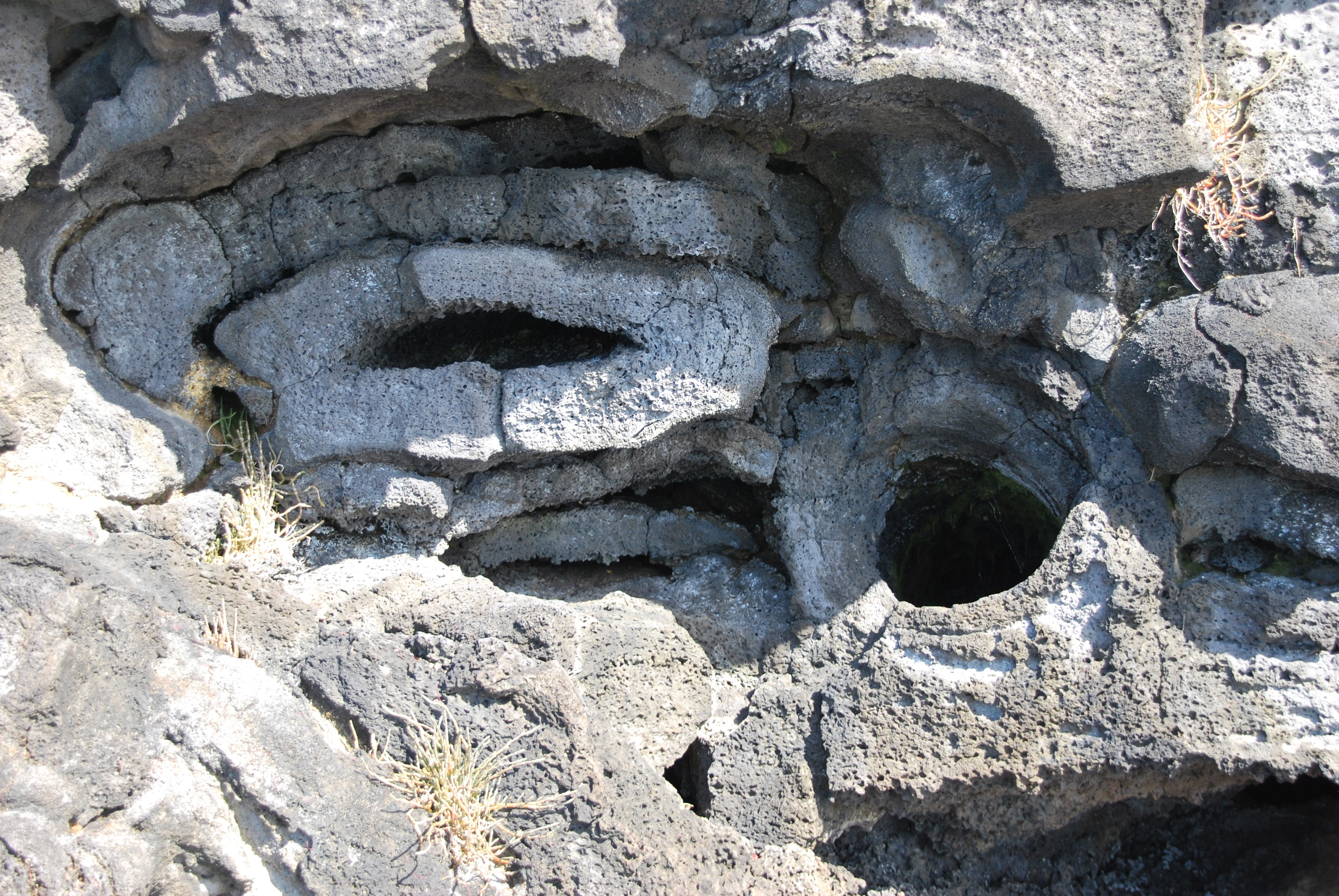
The most recent eruption of Lake Pupuke led to the creation of Takapuna Reef and the Takapuna Fossil Forest

The North Shore is primarily uplifted Waitemata Group sandstone, that was deposited on the sea floor during the Early Miocene, between 22 and 16 million years ago. The Takapuna area is home to Lake Pupuke, a volcanic maar which is one of the oldest known features of the Auckland volcanic field, erupting an estimated 193,200 years ago. A small scoria cone existed to the west of Lake Pupuke, which was quarried during European settlement.

During the eruption of Lake Pupuke, two lava flows travelled eastwards through the area, burning vegetation and encasing the lower 1–2 metres of the tree trunks in lava. The lava solidified into basalt rock, creating the Takapuna Fossil Forest, which was exposed an estimated 7,000 years ago due to coastal erosion.

Prior to human settlement, pōhutukawa trees dominated the coastal margins of the North Shore. The inland North Shore was a mixed podocarp-broadleaf forest dominated by kauri. To the west of Takapuna is Smiths Bush in the Onewa Domain, a remnant native forest, dominated by kahikatea and taraire trees. By the 1850s, Takapuna was primarily a mānuka scrubland, with significant coastal areas dominated by harakeke.

== Geography ==
Takapuna is an isthmus between the Hauraki Gulf and Shoal Bay, a long narrow bay of the Waitematā Harbour. Takapuna is surrounded by the suburbs of Hauraki to the south-east, Northcote to the south-west, Hillcrest and Wairau Valley to the west, and Milford north of Lake Pupuke. The highest point in the suburb is 34 metres (112 ft) above sea-level, located at the Killarney Street and the Terrace.

Two beaches are located in the eastern parts of the suburb. Takapuna Beach is found to the south, which faces toward Rangitoto Island across the Rangitoto Channel. Further north along the coast is Thorne Bay, which features a rock formation called Black Rock, at the northern point of the bay.

Barrys Point is a headland in Takapuna south of Esmonde Road that extends into Shoal Bay.

== History ==
=== Māori history ===
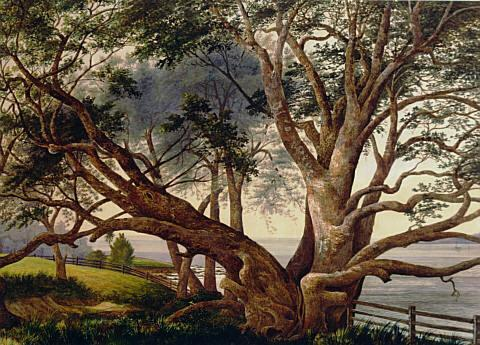
Pohutukawa, near the landing place below Lake Pupuke, Takapuna, an 1876 watercolour by Alfred Sharpe, depicting Te Uru Tapu

Māori settlement of the Auckland Region began around the 13th or 14th centuries. The Devonport-Takapuna area was one of the earliest settled in the region, known to be settled by the Tāmaki Māori ancestor Peretū. Toi-te-huatahi and his followers settled and interwed with these early peoples.

Around the year 1350, the Tainui migratory canoe visited the Takapuna area, stopping at the freshwater spring southwest of Maungauika / North Head. Some members of the crew decided to settle permanently in the area, including Taikehu, and intermarried with the people of the North Shore. Kāinga were found throughout the wider Takapuna area, protected by pā at Castor Bay (Te Rahopara o Peretū) to the north, with Takarunga / Mount Victoria and Maungauika / North Head to the south. Over time, the descendants of these people began to identify as Ngā Oho and Ngāi Tai.

The warrior Maki migrated from the Kāwhia Harbour to his ancestral home in the Auckland Region, likely sometime in the 17th century. Maki conquered and unified many the Tāmaki Māori tribes as Te Kawerau ā Maki, including those of the North Shore. After Maki's death, his sons settled different areas of his lands, creating new hapū. His younger son Maraeariki settled the North Shore and Hibiscus Coast, who based himself at the head of the Ōrewa River. Maraeariki's daughter Kahu succeeded him, and she is the namesake of the North Shore, Te Whenua Roa o Kahu ("The Greater Lands of Kahu"). Many of the iwi of the North Shore, including Ngāti Manuhiri, Ngāti Maraeariki, Ngāti Kahu, Ngāti Poataniwha, Ngāi Tai ki Tāmaki and Ngāti Whātua, can trace their lineage to Kahu.

In the 17th century, Ngāti Pāoa attacked the settlements around the Waitematā Harbour, later intermarrying with the Te Kawerau ā Maki and Ngāi Tai people of the southern North Shore. During intertribal war with Ngāpuhi, the pā at Maungauika / North Head was sieged in 1793, leading Ngāti Pāoa to refocus their settlements on Waiheke Island until the 1830s. During the early 1820s, most Māori of the North Shore fled for the Waikato or Northland due to the threat of war parties during the Musket Wars.

==== Lake Pupuke and Te Riri a Mataaho ====
Lake Pupuke was an important location to Tāmaki Māori of the North Shore. It was used a source of fresh water, and its name Pupuke Moana ("Overflowing Sea") referred to how the fresh water would habitually flow out from the lake to the sea. Eels and mussels were harvested from the lake, and birds who were attracted to the lake were snared for food, and harakeke from the shores could be harvested for textiles. The northern shores of the lake was home to a grove of karaka trees, which were likely used for both food and medicinal purposes.

Takapuna is part of the setting of Te Riri a Mataaho ("The Wrath of Mataaho"), a Ngāi Tai ki Tāmaki traditional story (pūrākau) that describes the creation of Lake Pupuke and Ngā Mahanga "The Twins", two rock formations on Takapuna Beach. Two tupua (children of the Fire God Mataaho), Matakamokamo and his wife Matakerepo, lived on Te Rua Maunga, a mountain located at Lake Pupuke. The couple argued over some flax clothing that Matakerepo had made for her husband, and the argument became so heated that the fire outside their dwelling died out. Matakamokamo cursed Mahuika, Goddess of the Fire, for allowing this to happen. Mahuika was furious at the couple, and asked Mataaho to punish them. Mataaho destroyed their mountain home, and in its place left Pupuke Moana (Lake Pupuke), while at the same time he formed the mountain Rangitoto. The couple fled to the newly formed island, where Mataaho formed three peaks on the mountain, so that the couple can view the ruins of their former home. Hinerei and Matamiha, the couples' twin children, were turned to stone, and remain as rock features on the southern Takapuna Beach.

==== Te Uru Tapu ====
To the north of Takapuna Beach is a wāhi tapu (sacred location) called Te Uru Tapu, a grove of pōhutukawa used for burial ceremonies by Tāmaki Māori. As a part of traditional burial practices, bodies would be wrapped in flax mats and placed in a sitting position in the trees, with the dead later being buried once their bodies had naturally decomposed.

In the early 2000s, the North Shore City Council built a boardwalk through the grove. Access was removed in June 2018 due to risks of falling branches, and access to the grove was not returned after the Auckland Council consulted with seven iwi. In 2021, vandals poisoned and cut down many of the trees in the grove, including karo, karaka, nīkau palms and tōtara, however did not target the pōhutukawa.

=== Early colonial period ===
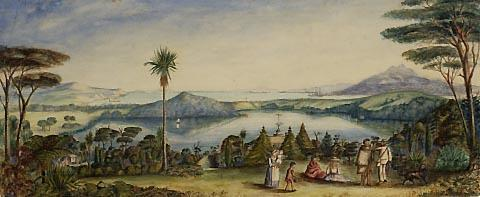
Lake Pupuke and the Hauraki Gulf depicted in an 1873 watercolour

The first land purchases at Takapuna were undertaken by Henry Taylor and Alexander Sparks in November 1839. These land sales were later disallowed, and Takapuna was purchased by the Crown on 13 April 1841 as a part of the Mahurangi Block. Farms were auctioned in 1844, and the first European farmers arrived in the Takapuna area in 1847. Early European settlers were predominantly from England, Scotland and Ireland, and they established farms around the lake. Crops such as wheat, maize, barley, potatoes and kūmara were grown at these farms, and homesteads planted single acre orchards dominated by plums, apples and peaches.

In 1849, the Catholic Church purchased land at Takapuna, where Jean-Baptiste Pompallier established St Mary's College, a school and later seminary that catered to both European and Māori.

In 1852, the Crown granted 110 acres (45 ha) of land south of Lake Pupuke to Barry's Point / Awataha to Ngāpuhi chief Eruera Maihi Patuone, in order to create a shield for the City of Auckland against potential invasion from Ngāpuhi and other northern tribes. Patuone's people lived in the area until the 1880s. Patuone named his settlement Waiwharariki, meaning "Waters of Wharariki", a mat made of harakeke flax. Patuone's lands at Waiwharariki included a peach tree orchard and a village of twenty huts. Many Ngāpuhi from the settlement worked on the farms at Lake Pupuke, establishing a network of fences for the properties.

In 1863, the first subdivisions were created in Takapuna, where villas were constructed on the eastern shores of Lake Pupuke. The streets were named after famous lakes of the world. A ferry service began to operate from Barry's Point at Shoal Bay, and the Takapuna Hotel was established in 1863 near the ferry launch. Despite the Long Depression of the 1880s, Takapuna grew as a community. By this period, sheep breeding had become important in northern Takapuna, and Takapuna dairy farms supplied milk for Auckland. A post office was established in Takapuna in 1880, followed by St Peter's Church in 1883.

During fears of Russian invasion in the 1880s, Fort Takapuna was established to the southeast of the suburb. Lake Pupuke became the major source of fresh water for the North Shore, with Devonport receiving fresh water in the 1890s, followed by Northcote in 1906. In 1913, a new The pumphouse was constructed on the lake, in order to supply Birkenhead with fresh water.

=== Tourism destination and trams ===
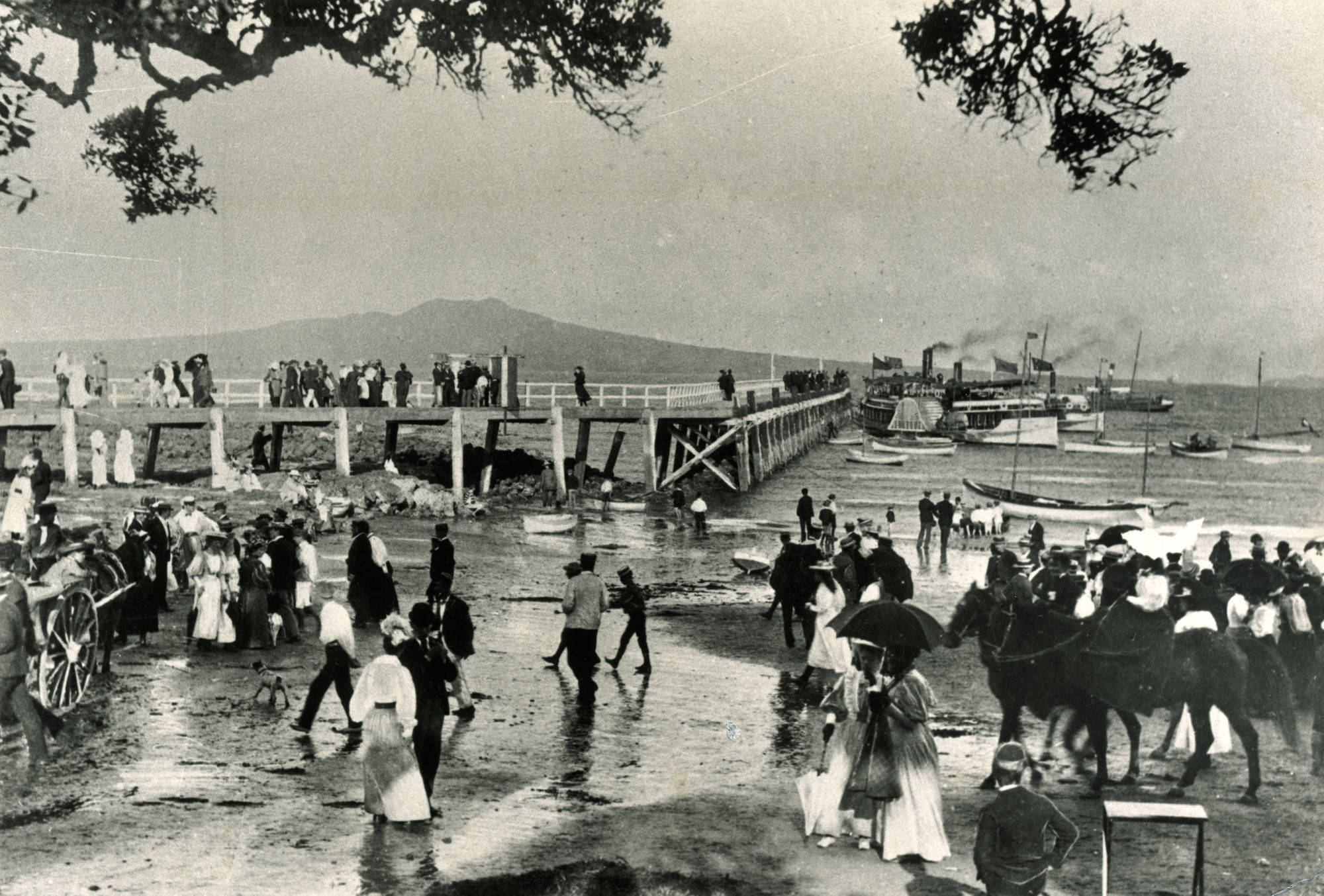
Excursioners arriving at the Takapuna Wharf in 1890

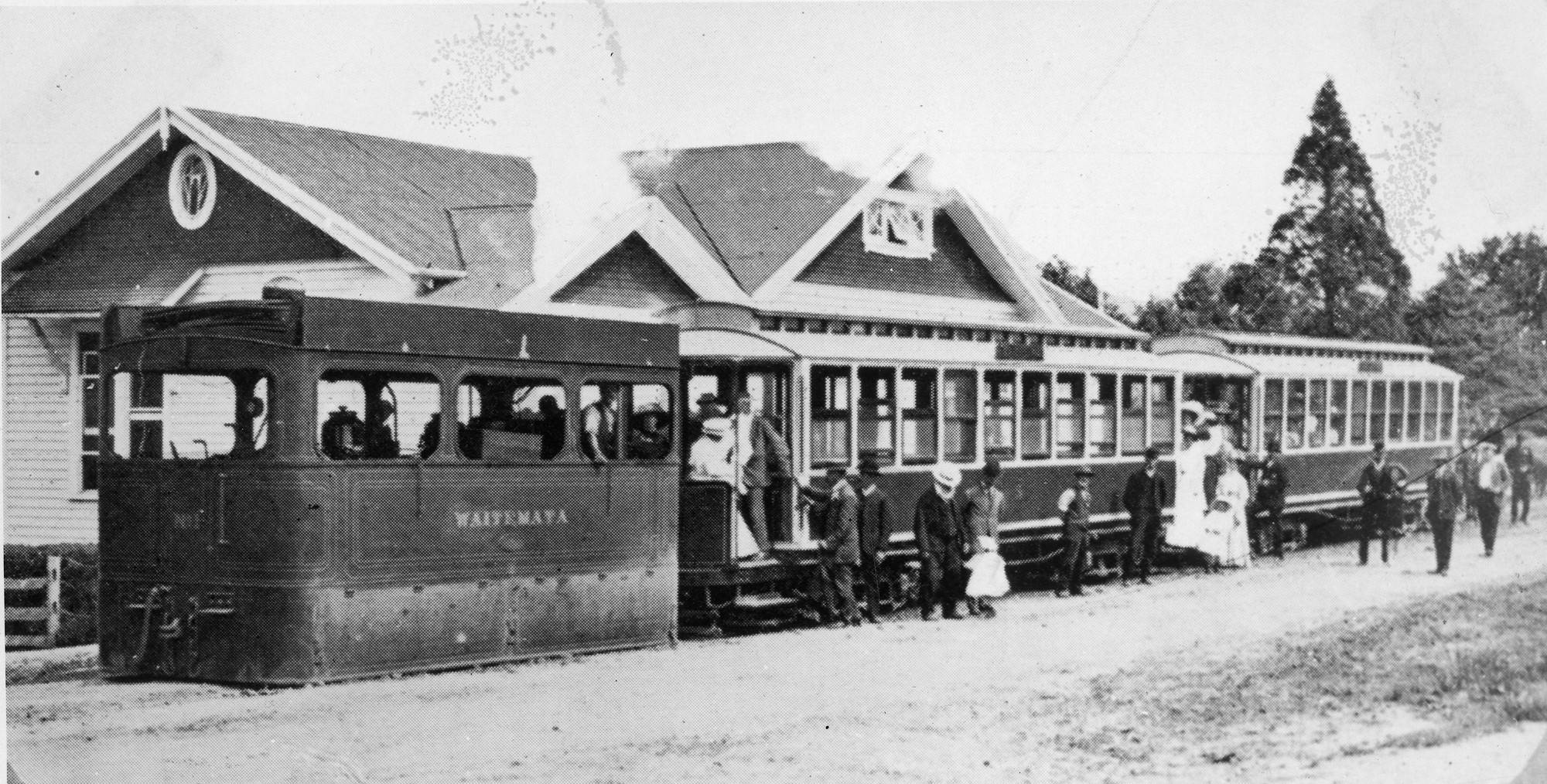
A steam tram outside the Mon Desir Hotel in 1910

By the late 1880s, Takapuna had developed into a destination for tourists, with Lake Pupuke being the main attraction. The increase in tourists encouraged farmers to subdivide their lands. The Lake Hotel was constructed, and large summer residences were constructed on the shores of the lake. The earliest subdivisions of farmland for suburban development were the Hurstmere estate in 1886, and the Pupuke Estate in 1889. The Takapuna and Milford Beach areas, as well as the land surrounding Lake Pupuke soon became popular spots for wealthy businessmen building summer homes to entertain in a rural surrounding, and eventually, many moved here permanently, commuting to work in Auckland via ferry.

By the late 1900s, Lake Pupuke diminished in importance for tourists, who were instead attracted to Takapuna Beach. In 1909, the Lake Hotel was destroyed in a fire. The hotel was not replaced, and instead the Mon Desir Hotel on the Takapuna beachfront was opened in 1909.

In 1910, a private tramway was established in Takapuna, which conveyed passengers to the ferry at Bayswater. A group of local businessmen proposed the tramway to Auckland Electric Tramways as a way to improve property prices in Takapuna. After the company declined their request due to the low population of the area, the businessmen established the Takapuna Tramways and Ferry Company Limited, operating both the tram and ferry. The plan was a success, leading to rapid suburban development in Takapuna. The tramway soon became unpopular, and closed 17 years later on 26 April 1927.

In 1914, a local cinema was opened in Takapuna, at the Forester's Hall in Anzac Street, and Chinese market gardeners established farms at Barrys Point in the 1920s.

By the 1930s, Takapuna transitioned from a tourist destination into a suburb of Auckland. Summer residences were gradually replaced by permanent housing, and Takapuna developed into a commercial centre on the North Shore. A number of Takapuna buildings date from this period, including Hall's Building, the Manona Building and the Strand Buildings.

During World War II, coastal defenses were built around the Takapuna area. A light industrial area developed at Barry Point in the 1950s, the Takapuna War Memorial Hall opened in 1953, and North Shore Hospital was opened as the first major public hospital on the North Shore on 19 July 1958.

=== Auckland Harbour Bridge and suburban development ===
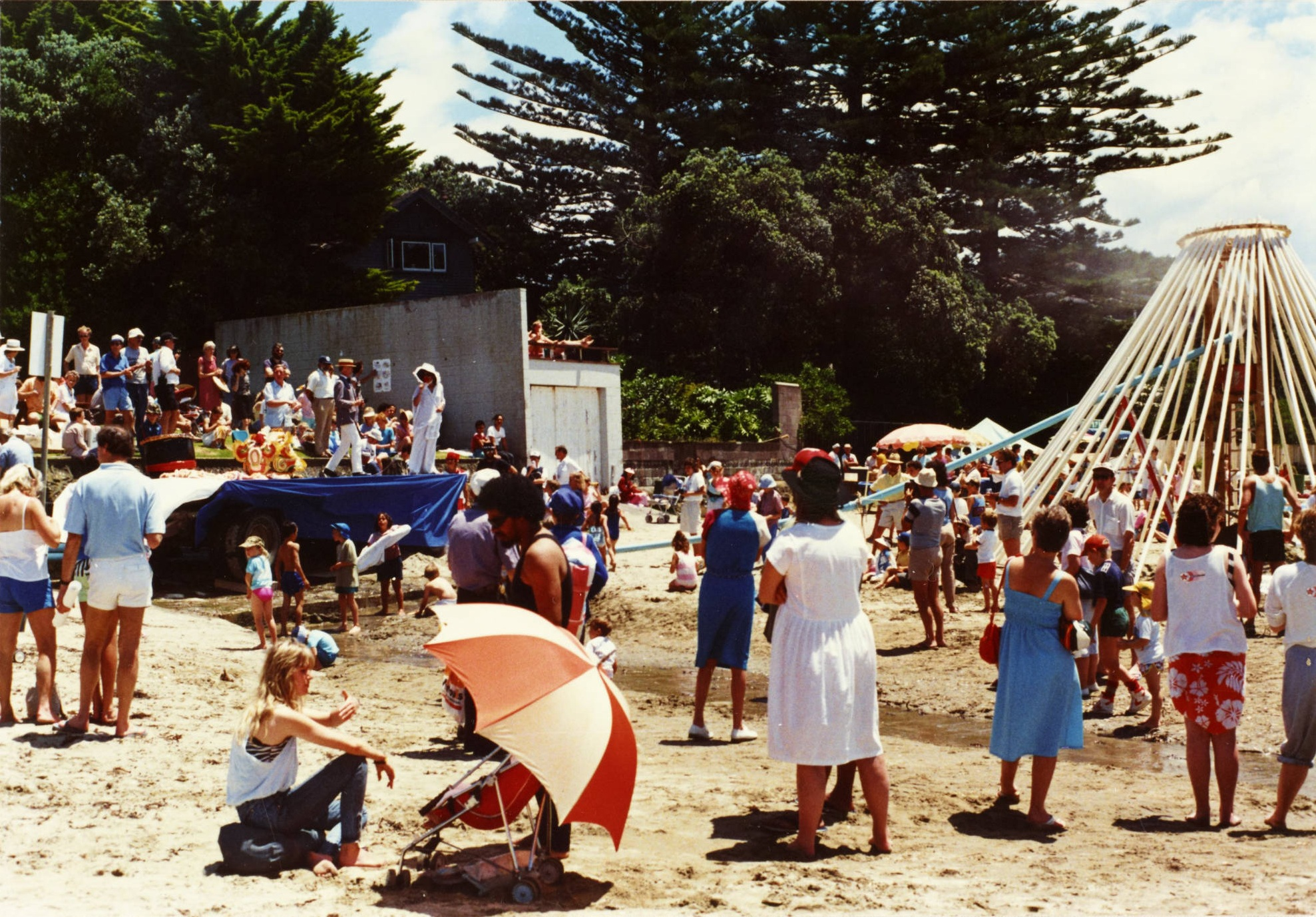
Mayor Wyn Hoadley opening the Takapuna City Council beach party in 1988

The Auckland Harbour Bridge was opened in 1959, creating a road bridge between the North Shore and Auckland City, causing an explosion of suburban growth across the North Shore. After the opening of the bridge, Takapuna became the administrative centre for Takapuna City (established in 1961), and later for North Shore City (established in 1989). This drew major retailers to the commercial centre of Takapuna, and branches of Woolworths, Rendells Department Store, and Milne & Choyce opened in the suburb, and were followed by a modern shopping centre, Shore City Shopping Centre.

In 1962, Takapuna became the location where the COMPAC submarine communications cable connected Auckland to Suva, Fiji, and onwards to Vancouver, Canada. The system was in use until 7 December 1984. In 2000, the Southern Cross Internet cable landed on Takapuna beach to connect New Zealand to Australia and the US. In 2021 the same landing site was used for that cable's successor, Southern Cross NEXT.

In 1996, the Bruce Mason Centre was opened as an events venue for Takapuna. In the late 1990s, the former Smale family farm was redeveloped into Smales Farm, a commercial complex adjacent to the motorway. The Clear Communications Centre opened here in 1999.

== Demographics ==
Takapuna covers 4.55 km^{2} (1.76 sq mi) and had an estimated population of 11,930 as of June 2025, with a population density of 2,622 people per km^{2}.

Historical population
Year	Pop.	±% p.a.
2006	9,387	—
2013	10,548	+1.68%
2018	11,337	+1.45%
2023	11,349	+0.02%

Takapuna had a population of 11,349 in the 2023 New Zealand census, an increase of 12 people (0.1%) since the 2018 census, and an increase of 801 people (7.6%) since the 2013 census. There were 5,355 males, 5,958 females and 33 people of other genders in 4,707 dwellings. 3.3% of people identified as LGBTIQ+. There were 1,533 people (13.5%) aged under 15 years, 1,992 (17.6%) aged 15 to 29, 5,067 (44.6%) aged 30 to 64, and 2,745 (24.2%) aged 65 or older.

People could identify as more than one ethnicity. The results were 64.1% European (Pākehā); 5.2% Māori; 2.3% Pasifika; 31.7% Asian; 3.7% Middle Eastern, Latin American and African New Zealanders (MELAA); and 1.7% other, which includes people giving their ethnicity as "New Zealander". English was spoken by 93.7%, Māori language by 0.9%, Samoan by 0.3%, and other languages by 31.7%. No language could be spoken by 1.6% (e.g. too young to talk). New Zealand Sign Language was known by 0.2%. The percentage of people born overseas was 46.7, compared with 28.8% nationally.

Religious affiliations were 36.4% Christian, 1.6% Hindu, 1.7% Islam, 0.1% Māori religious beliefs, 1.6% Buddhist, 0.3% New Age, 0.5% Jewish, and 1.1% other religions. People who answered that they had no religion were 50.9%, and 5.9% of people did not answer the census question.

Of those at least 15 years old, 4,191 (42.7%) people had a bachelor's or higher degree, 3,738 (38.1%) had a post-high school certificate or diploma, and 1,890 (19.3%) people exclusively held high school qualifications. 1,998 people (20.4%) earned over $100,000 compared to 12.1% nationally. The employment status of those at least 15 was that 4,680 (47.7%) people were employed full-time, 1,281 (13.1%) were part-time, and 210 (2.1%) were unemployed.

Individual statistical areas
Name	Area (km^{2})	Population	Density (per km^{2})	Dwellings	Median age	Median income
Westlake	0.69	2,862	4,148	1,002	39.4 years	$46,300
Takapuna West	2.01	3,420	1,701	1,506	42.7 years	$44,100
Takapuna Central	1.14	2,898	2,542	1,383	50.9 years	$56,900
Takapuna South	0.72	2,169	3,013	816	42.4 years	$54,700
New Zealand					38.1 years	$41,500

== Local government ==
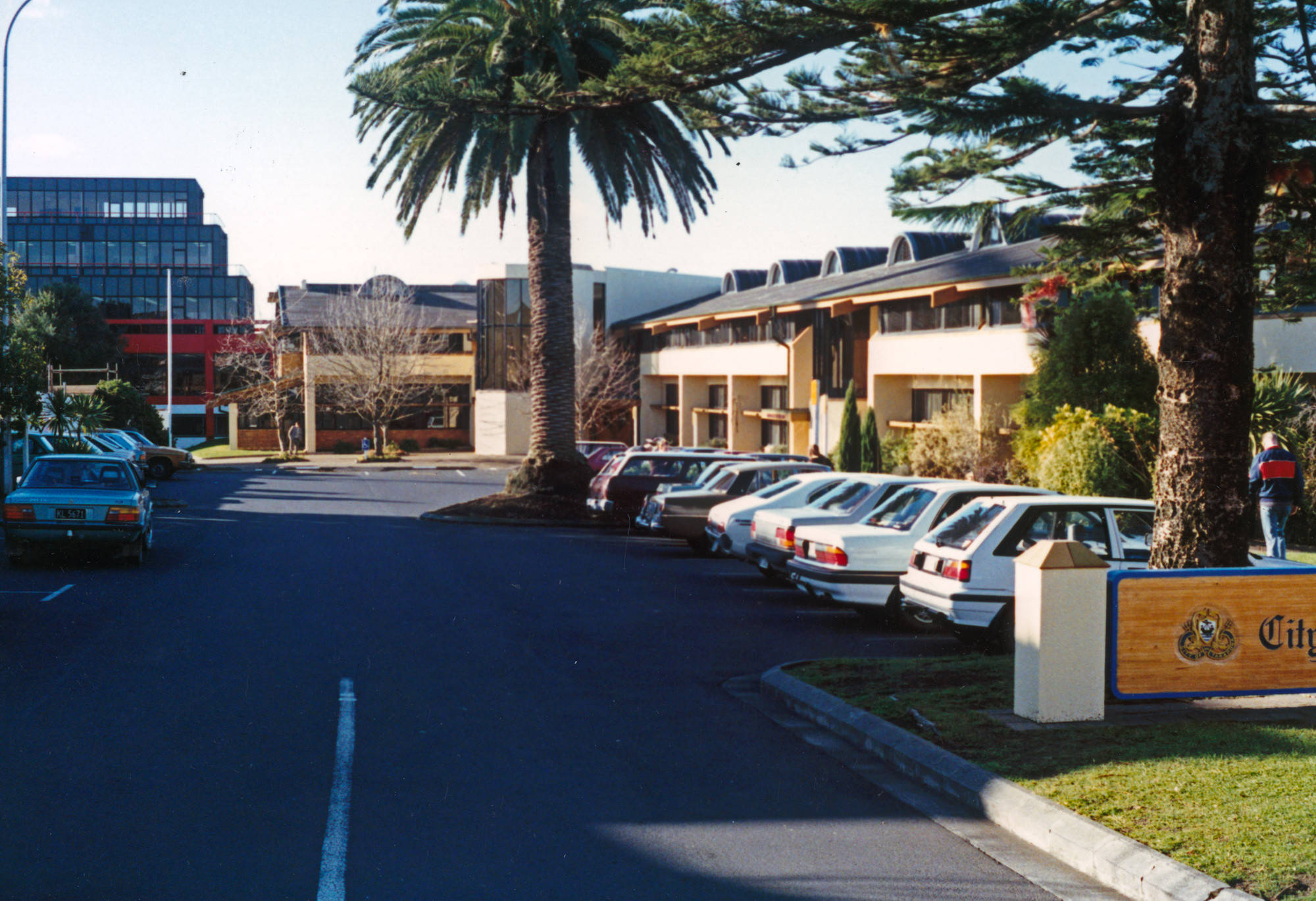
Takapuna City Council buildings in 1989

The first local government in the area was the Lake Highway District, also known as the Takapuna Highway District, which began operating 1867. In June 1889 the road board was dissolved, in favour of Takapuna being under the direct control of the Waitemata County Council. The Borough of Takapuna was established on 1 July 1913, after 73% of electors in Takapuna voted for independence from the Waitemata County. The first mayor, Ewen Alison, had previously served as the Mayor of Devonport, and by 1914 the borough council began working on improving roads, footpaths and street lighting. In 1954, Takapuna Borough expanded its borders to include Castor Bay to the north.

After significant growth in population, Takapuna Borough became Takapuna City in 1961. On 1 August 1974, the Waitemata County was dissolved, leading to rural northern North Shore areas, such as Glenfield, Albany and Long Bay, to be incorporated into Takapuna City. In 1989, Takapuna City was merged into the North Shore City. North Shore City was amalgamated into Auckland Council in November 2010.

Within the Auckland Council, Takapuna is a part of the Devonport-Takapuna local government area governed by the Devonport-Takapuna Local Board. It is a part of the North Shore ward, which elects two councillors to the Auckland Council.

=== List of mayors ===
Between 1913 and 1989, Takapuna had 11 mayors. The following is a complete list:

	Name	Portrait	Term of office
Takapuna Borough Council
1	Ewen Alison		1913–1914
2	William Blomfield		1914–1921
3	Arthur Mason Gould		1921–1924
4	James William Hayden		1924–1925
5	John Dugald Morison		1925–1927
6	Julius Williamson		1927–1931
7	John Guiniven		1931–1950
8	Douglas Sheath		1950–1956
9	Bill Henderson		1956–1961
Takapuna City Council
(9)	Bill Henderson		1961–1965
10	Fred Thomas		1965–1986
11	Wyn Hoadley		1986–1989

== Notable people ==
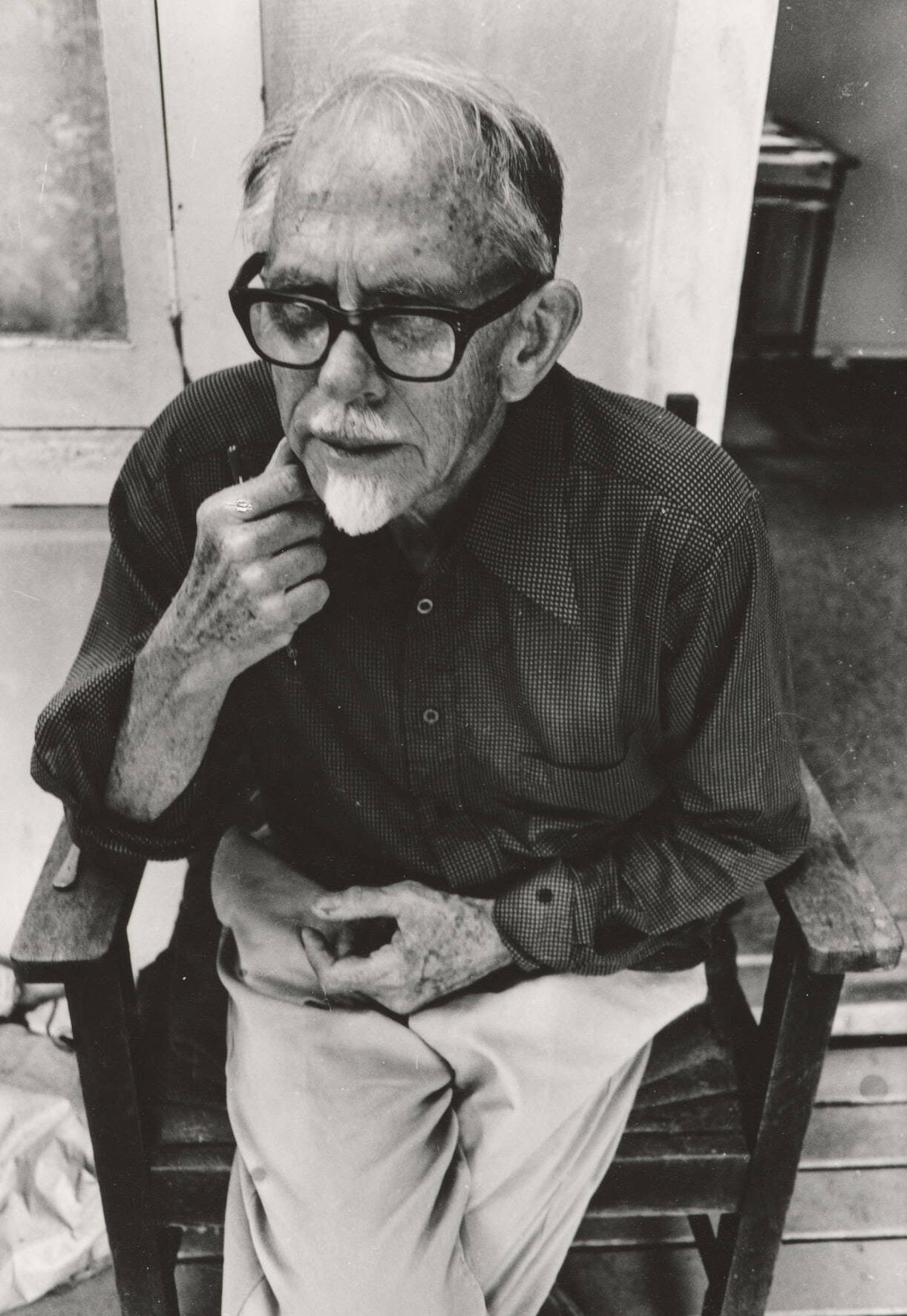
Playwright Frank Sargeson at his house on Esmonde Road, Takapuna in 1977

- Claire Ahuriri-Dunning – New Zealand playwright
- Ewen Alison – politician and first mayor of Takapuna.
- William Blomfield – New Zealand cartoonist and local politician
- Henry Brett – journalist and Mayor of Auckland City.
- Lisa Chappell – New Zealand actor (born 1968)
- David Goldie – timber merchant and Mayor of Auckland City.
- William John Hurst – Mayor of Auckland City.
- Lorde – New Zealand singer-songwriter (born 1996)
- Bruce Mason – playwright
- Deborah Pullen – footballer
- Winston Reid – footballer
- Frank Sargeson – playwright
- Keith Sinclair – historian
- Harry Sinclair – film director
- Stephen Sinclair – playwright and screenwriter
- Pamela Stephenson – TV personality, psychologist, comedian
- Kody Nielson – musician and producer

== Literary scene and popular culture ==
Short story writer Frank Sargeson moved to his parents' holiday home in Takapuna in 1931, and regularly had figures within New Zealand's literary scene stay at his home (now known as the Frank Sargeson House). Among these guests was Janet Frame, who wrote her debut novel Owls Do Cry (1957) in the army hut at his residence.

Takapuna resident Bruce Mason's play The End of the Golden Weather (1960) is set in Takapuna, and depicts the 1930s holiday culture of the suburb. In 1991, an Ian Mune film adaptation was produced for the play, which was primarily shot in Takapuna.

The TVNZ comedy-drama Go Girls was set in Takapuna. The Block NZ's first season took place in Takapuna.

Shania Twain's 2003 music video for "When You Kiss Me" was shot in Takapuna.

== Amenities ==
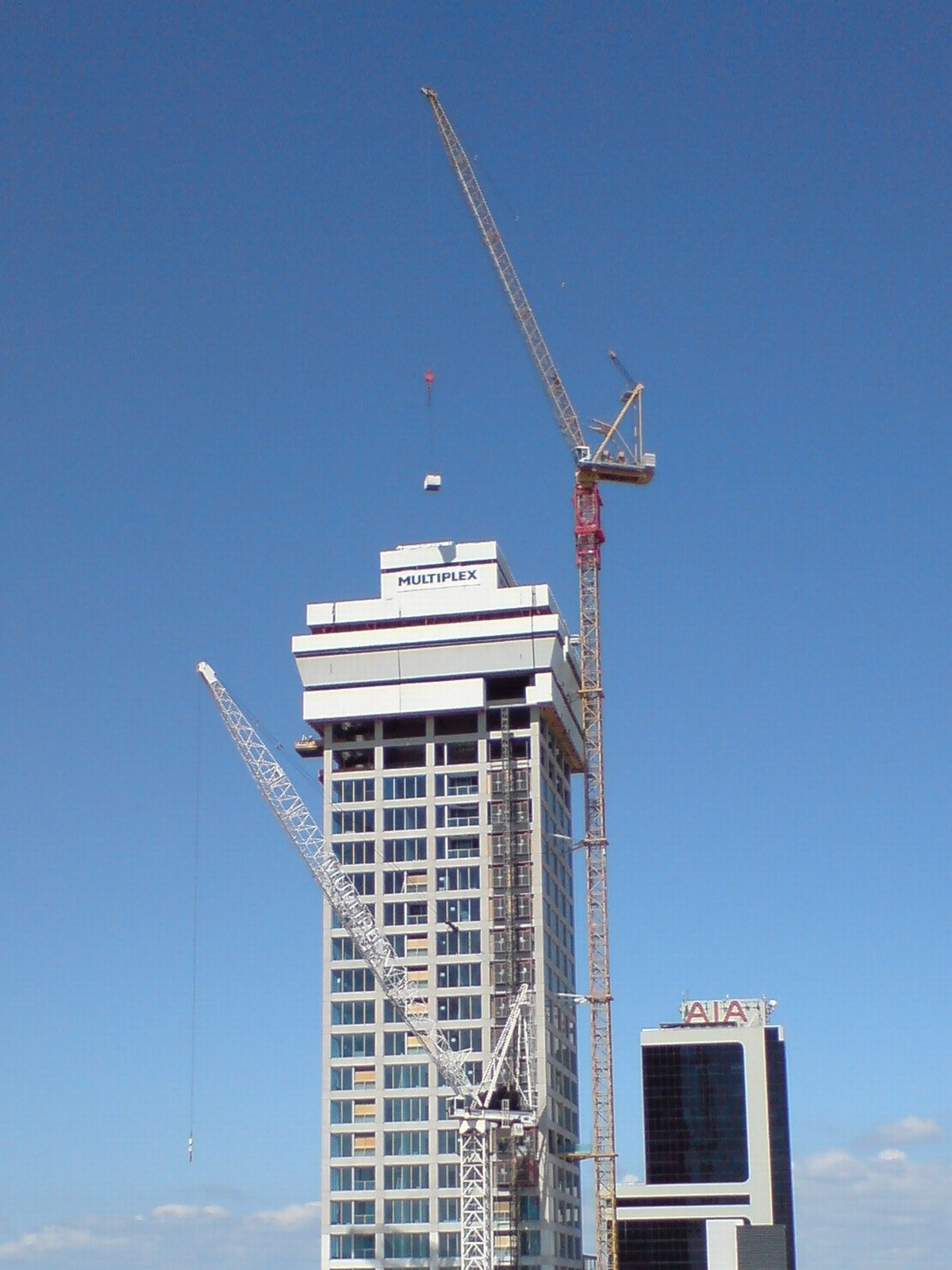
The Sentinel under construction.

- The Takapuna Beach area is a nightlife hub and boutique shopping centre of the North Shore, having many bars, restaurants, cafes and shops.
- Shore City Shopping Centre opened in Takapuna in 1974. It covers 14,900 m^{2}, and has 826 carparks and 63 shops, including Farmers, New World Metro and Les Mills.
- Takapuna Library, which first began operating in 1874, with its current premises established in 1989. The library operates a local history archive, including an index of local newspapers, archives, photographs, oral histories, and historical material relating to Takapuna.

== Sport ==
Takapuna is home to Takapuna AFC who compete in the Lotto Sport Italia NRFL Division 1A. Since 1974 Takapuna Rugby Football Club has been located at Onewa Domain, which is in the neighbouring suburb of Northcote. Prior to that the club were located at Taharoto Park which is located on Taharoto Rd in Takapuna.

== Education ==
Westlake Boys High School and Westlake Girls High School are single-sex secondary (years 9-13) state schools with rolls of 2,773 and 2,289 respectively, as of July 2026. Westlake High School, which opened in 1958, became Westlake Girls High School in 1962 after Westlake Boys High School opened.

Rosmini College is a boys' secondary (years 7–13) school with a roll of 1,208, and St Joseph's School is a coeducational contributing primary (years 1–6) school with a roll of 418. They are state integrated Catholic schools located adjacent to each other. Rosmini College was founded in 1962, and St Joseph's in 1894.

Takapuna Normal Intermediate is a coeducational intermediate (years 7–8) school with a roll of 721. It was established in 1970.

Takapuna School is a coeducational contributing primary (years 1–6) school with a roll of 366. It celebrated its 125th jubilee in 2004.

Rolls are as of July 2026.

Takapuna Grammar School is in Belmont, to the southeast of Takapuna. It is the main public secondary school in the area.

== Bibliography ==
- Bartlett, Jean (2001). Takapuna: People and Places (2nd ed.). Auckland: North Shore City Council. ISBN 978-0-473-07877-5. OCLC 973591276. Wikidata Q123755661.
- Christmas, Judith (1983), A History of Northcote, Northcote Borough Council, OCLC 154573998, Wikidata Q123591383
- McClure, Margaret (1987). The Story of Birkenhead. Birkenhead City Council. ISBN 0-908704-04-6. OL 33998949W. Wikidata Q120679112.
- Verran, David (2010), The North Shore: An Illustrated History, North Shore: Random House, OL 33434370W, Wikidata Q120520385
