= Torpedo Bay =

Torpedo Bay may refer to:

== Engineering ==
- Torpedo tubes, also known as torpedo bays, cylindrical devices for launching torpedoes

== Places ==
- Torpedo Bay, New Zealand, a bay of the Waitematā Harbour in Auckland, New Zealand
- Torpedo Bay Navy Museum, located on the shores of Torpedo Bay

== Films ==
- Torpedo Bay (film), a 1963 war film
