= Milford, New Zealand =

Milford
- Suburb
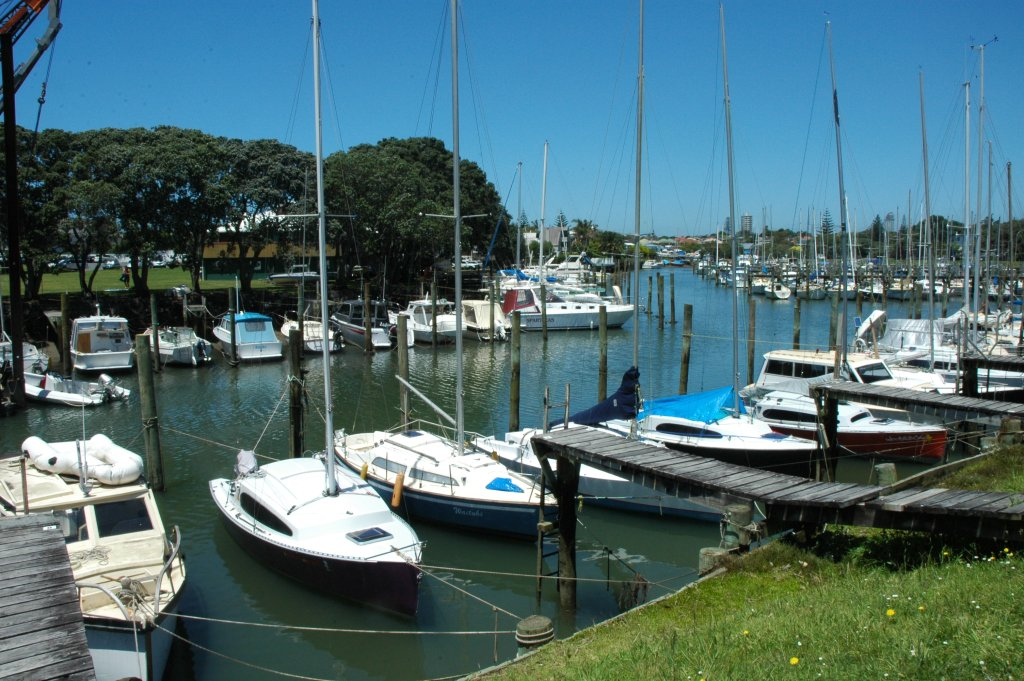
- Milford Marina
- Interactive map of Milford
- Coordinates: 36.773°S 174.76°E
- Country: New Zealand
- City: Auckland
- Local authority: Auckland Council
- Electoral ward: North Shore ward
- Local board: Devonport-Takapuna Local Board

Area
  - Land: 153 ha (380 acres)

Population (June 2025)
  - Total: 5,140
  - Density: 3,360/km^{2} (8,700/sq mi)
- Postcode: 0620

Forrest Hill	Castor Bay	(Hauraki Gulf)
Wairau Valley	Milford	(Hauraki Gulf)
Hillcrest	Takapuna	Takapuna

Milford is a suburb located on the North Shore, Auckland. It is located on northern side of Lake Pupuke. It also has a popular swimming beach, which runs some two kilometres from Black Rock in the south to Castor Bay in the north. The Wairau Creek reaches the sea at the Hauraki Gulf at the northern end of Milford Beach, and its lower tidal reaches host the Milford Marina.

== Etymology ==
The first references to Milford Road date from 1892, and the first references to Milford Beach from 1894. The Milford housing estate is first mentioned from 1910, and some of the earliest references to Milford as a suburb date from 1912. The name's origin is associated with early resident Edwin Harrow who settled in the area in 1881. The name is either a reference to Milford House, one Harrow's residences on the shores of Lake Pupuke where his wife lived after they separated, or to his hometown, Milford Haven in Wales.

== Geology ==
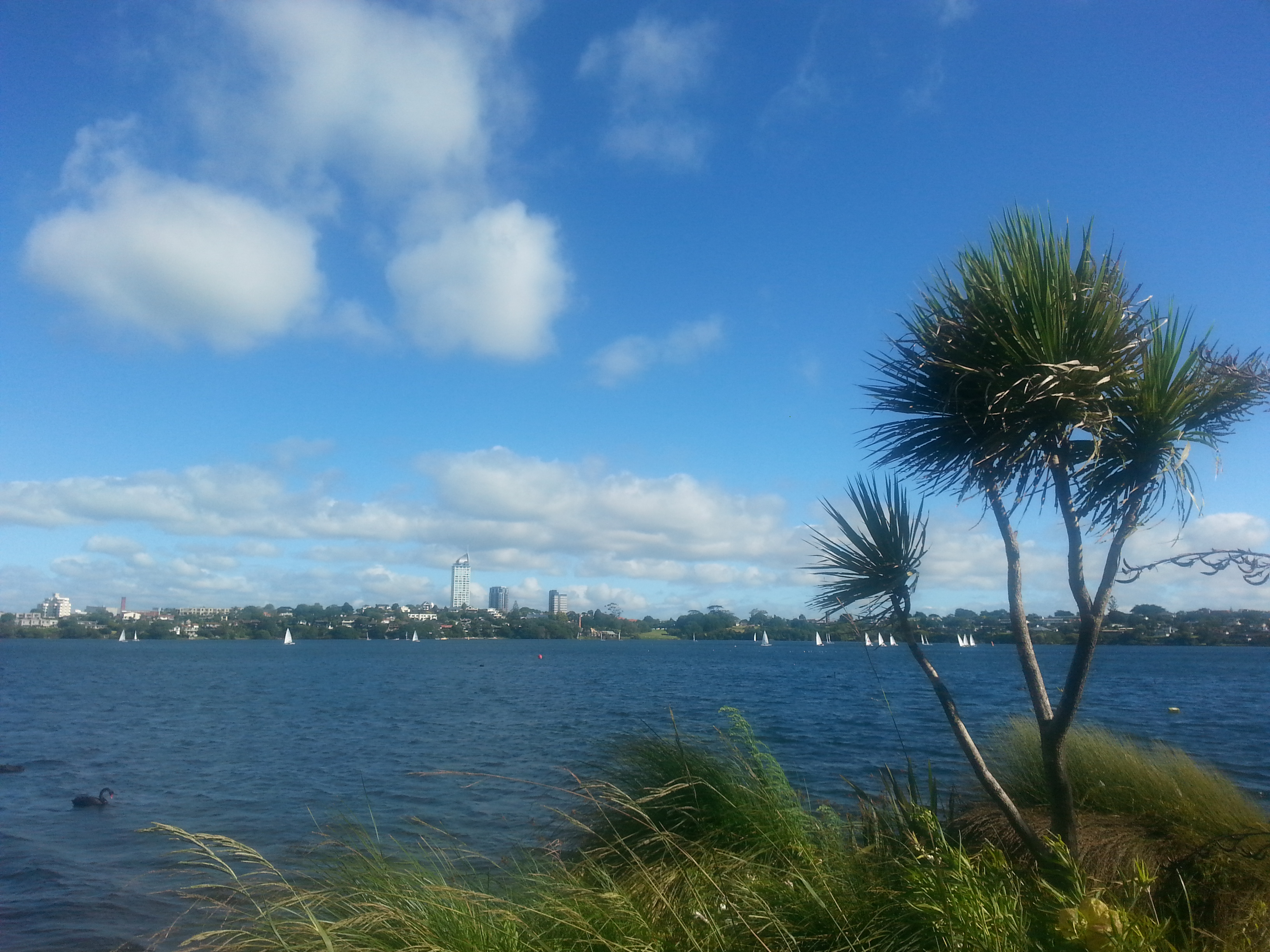
Lake Pupuke is a volcanic maar located between Milford and Takapuna, and one of the oldest known features of the Auckland volcanic field

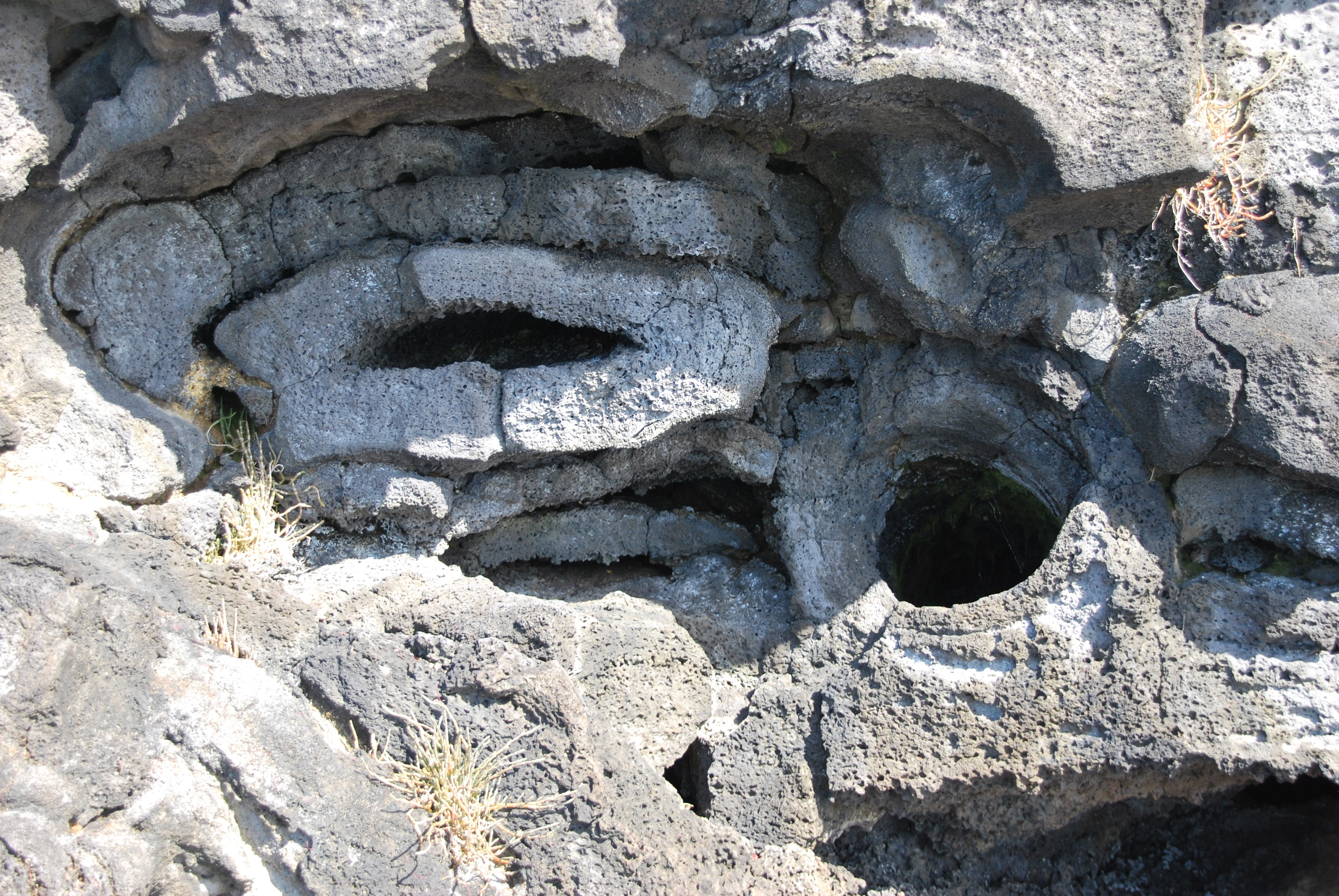
The most recent eruption of Lake Pupuke led to the creation of Takapuna Reef and the Takapuna Fossil Forest

The North Shore is primarily uplifted Waitemata Group sandstone, that was deposited on the sea floor during the Early Miocene, between 22 and 16 million years ago. Milford is home to Lake Pupuke, a volcanic maar which is one of the oldest known features of the Auckland volcanic field, erupting an estimated 193,200 years ago. During the eruption of Lake Pupuke, two lava flows travelled eastwards through the area, burning vegetation and encasing the lower 1–2 metres of the tree trunks in lava. The lava solidified into basalt rock, creating the Takapuna Fossil Forest, which was exposed an estimated 7,000 years ago due to coastal erosion.

Prior to human settlement, pōhutukawa trees dominated the coastal margins of the North Shore. The inland North Shore was a mixed podocarp-broadleaf forest dominated by kauri. To the southwest of Milford is Smiths Bush in the Onewa Domain, a remnant native forest, dominated by kahikatea and taraire trees.

== Geography ==
Milford is located on the northern shores of Lake Pupuke, to the west of Milford Beach. A rock formation called Black Rock is found at the eastern end of Milford Beach. Milford is surrounded by the suburbs of Takapuna, Wairau Valley, Forrest Hill and Castor Bay. The Wairau Creek flows through the North Shore, and enters the Rangitoto Channel of the Hauraki Gulf at Milford. The highest point in the suburb is 49 metres (161 ft) above sea-level, at the northwestern end of Belmont Terrace.

== History ==
=== Māori history ===
Māori settlement of the Auckland Region began around the 13th or 14th centuries. The Devonport-Takapuna area was one of the earliest settled in the region, known to be settled by the Tāmaki Māori ancestor Peretū. Toi-te-huatahi and his followers settled and interwed with these early peoples. The pā to the north of Milford at Castor Bay, Te Rahopara o Peretū, takes its name from Peretū.

Milford Beach was traditionally known by the name Onemaewao ("The Beach of Maewao"), referring to supernatural beings who in traditional stories lived on the North Shore, Motutapu and Motuihe. Traditional stories tell of a party of Maewao, foraging for shellfish at the beach, perishing when the sun rose.

The warrior Maki migrated from the Kāwhia Harbour to his ancestral home in the Auckland Region, likely sometime in the 17th century. Maki conquered and unified many the Tāmaki Māori tribes as Te Kawerau ā Maki, including those of the North Shore. After Maki's death, his sons settled different areas of his lands, creating new hapū. His younger son Maraeariki settled the North Shore and Hibiscus Coast, who based himself at the head of the Ōrewa River. Maraeariki's daughter Kahu succeeded him, and she is the namesake of the North Shore, Te Whenua Roa o Kahu ("The Greater Lands of Kahu"). Many of the iwi of the North Shore, including Ngāti Manuhiri, Ngāti Maraeariki, Ngāti Kahu, Ngāti Poataniwha, Ngāi Tai ki Tāmaki and Ngāti Whātua, can trace their lineage to Kahu.

The headland above Milford beach north of the Wairau Creek mouth was the location of a defensive pā known as Wairoa Pā.

In the 17th century, Ngāti Pāoa attacked the settlements around the Waitematā Harbour, later intermarrying with the Te Kawerau ā Maki and Ngāi Tai people of the southern North Shore. During intertribal war with Ngāpuhi, the pā at Maungauika / North Head was sieged in 1793, leading Ngāti Pāoa to refocus their settlements on Waiheke Island until the 1830s. During the early 1820s, most Māori of the North Shore fled for the Waikato or Northland due to the threat of war parties during the Musket Wars.

=== Early colonial period ===
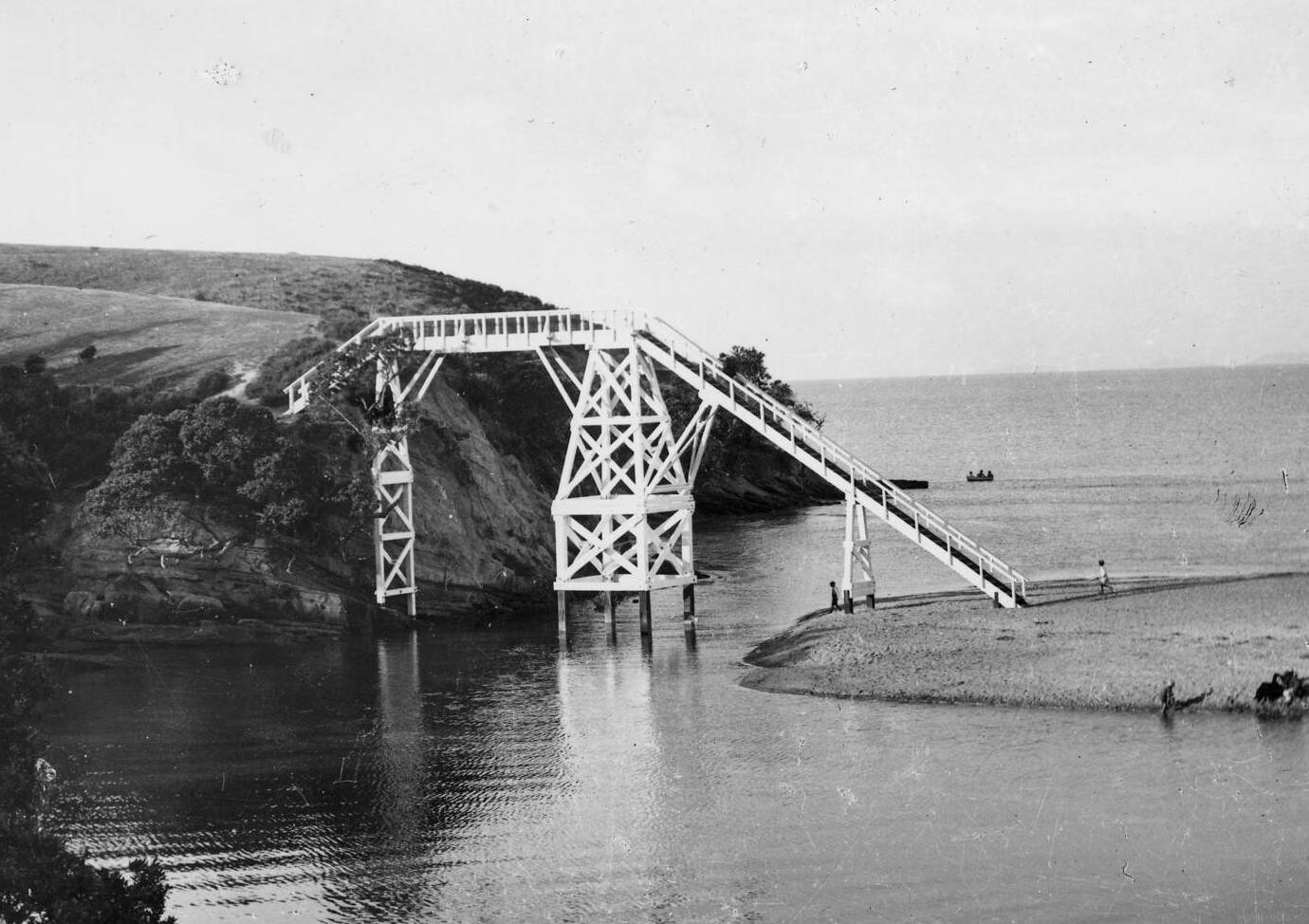
The historic Milford footbridge in the 1920s

The Milford area was purchased by the Crown on 13 April 1841 as a part of the Mahurangi Block. The first European farmers arrived in the area in 1847. Early European settlers were predominantly from England, Scotland and Ireland, and they established farms around the lake. Crops such as wheat, maize, barley, potatoes and kūmara were grown at these farms, and homesteads planted single acre orchards dominated by plums, apples and peaches. The Milford area was original known as Campbell's Bush, after John Logan Campbell, who had purchased vast tracts of the North Shore, including the location of modern Kitchener Road in Milford.

By the late 1880s, Takapuna and Lake Pupuke had developed into a destination for tourists, with Lake Pupuke being the main attraction. The increase in tourists encouraged farmers to subdivide their lands. The Lake Hotel was constructed, and large summer residences were constructed on the shores of the lake. The Takapuna and Milford Beach areas, as well as the land surrounding Lake Pupuke soon became popular spots for wealthy businessmen building summer homes to entertain in a rural surrounding, and eventually, many moved here permanently, commuting to work in Auckland via ferry.

James Sheriff operated a kauri gum store at Milford, near the Wairau Creek. Due to Sheriff's home and store, Milford became a point where goods were traded between Auckland and the farms surrounding Milford. By 1900, the Wairau Estuary was increasingly polluted, as the stream's catchment had been converted to pasture.

=== Suburban development ===
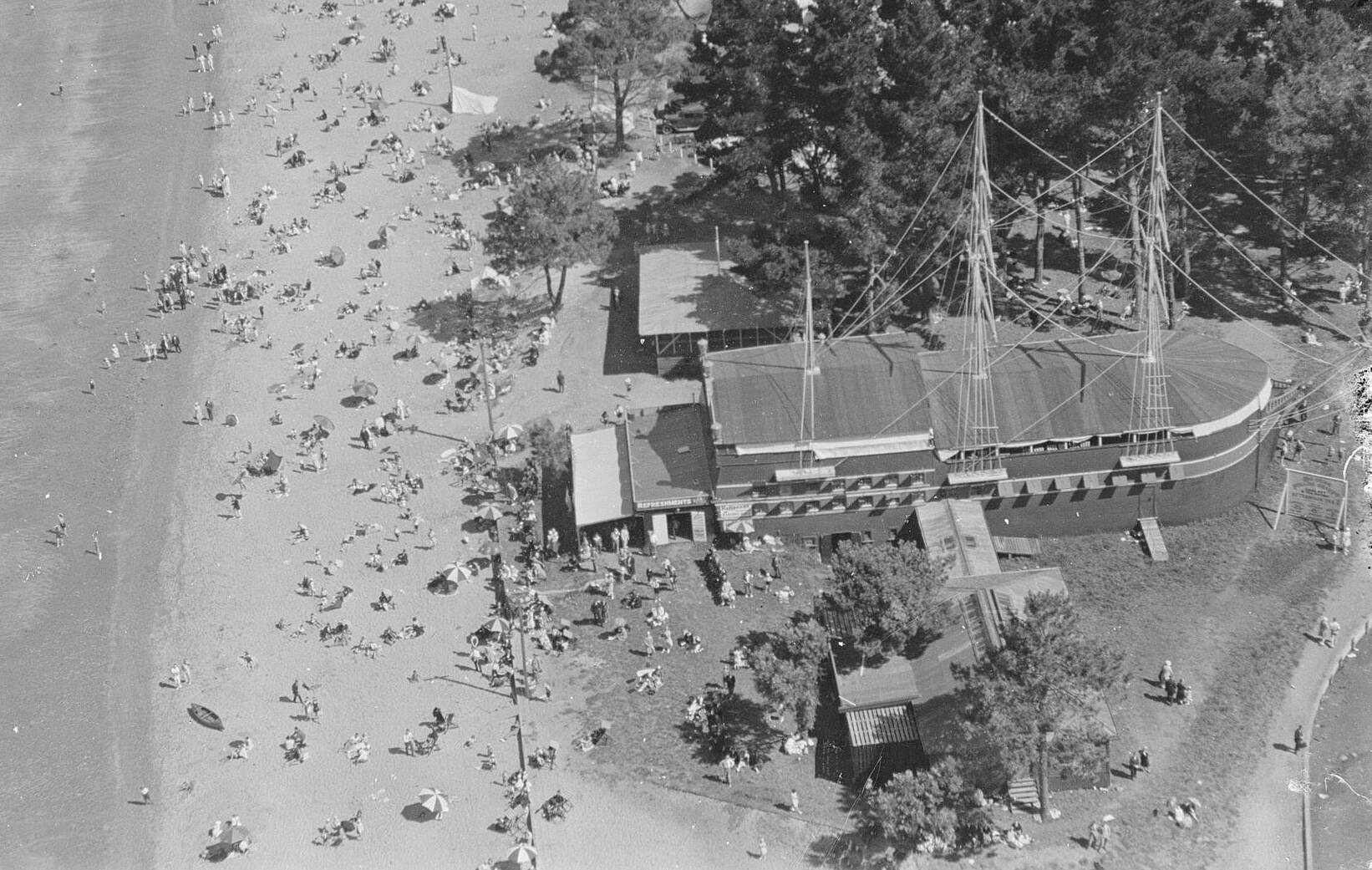
Aerial view of Milford Beach and Ye Olde Pirate Shippe, between 1929 and 1937

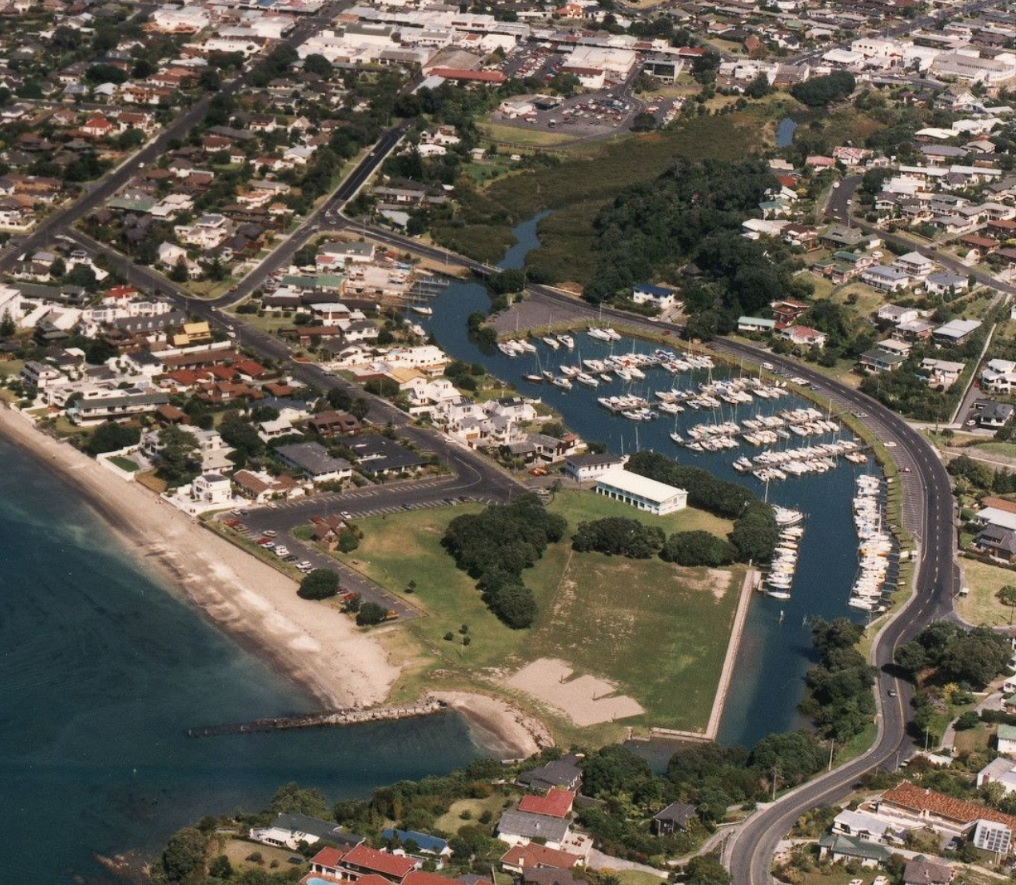
Aerial view of the Milford Marina and Wairau Creek in 1992

In 1910, a private tramway was established, which conveyed passengers from Milford to the ferry at Bayswater. A group of local businessmen proposed the tramway to Auckland Electric Tramways as a way to improve property prices in Takapuna. After the company declined their request due to the low population of the area, the businessmen established the Takapuna Tramways and Ferry Company Limited, operating both the tram and ferry. The plan was a success, leading to rapid suburban development in Takapuna. The tramway soon became unpopular due to competition, and closed 17 years later on 26 April 1927. The trams led to suburban development at Milford, transforming the area from a rural area into a holidaying community. As a part of the suburban development, a tall footbridge over the Wairau Creek was constructed between Milford and the cliffs of southern Castor Bay.

By the 1920s, Milford became a centre for entertainment. In 1922, two competing cinemas were established in Milford, the Milford Picture Drome and the Bridgeway Theatre. In January 1929, Ye Olde Pirate Shippe was opened. An elaborate dance hall and restaurant designed by James Fletcher to look like a pirate ship, the venue was a popular destination for Aucklanders. This was joined by the Milford swimming pool, opened in 1936. In 1927, the Inga Road bridge was constructed. During World War II, American troops often frequented the pirate ship. Milford lost its prominence as a tourist destination after the war. The pirate ship was demolished in the 1950s, and the pools were removed in 1957.

During the 1920s, Mr. Sands operated a scoria and basalt quarry at Milford, quarrying the small volcanic cone adjacent to Lake Pupuke. The first concrete road was constructed between Milford and Bayswater, and in the mid-1920s a sewage outlet was constructed at Black Rock in Milford.

The Auckland Harbour Bridge opened in 1959, connecting the North Shore to Auckland City in the south. The bridge caused suburbanisation across the North Shore, and led to Milford transitioning from a holiday community to a residential suburb in the 1960s and 1970s. In 1968, an apartment building called the Circle was constructed at the former Goldie family estate, purported to be the first apartment building with 360 views in New Zealand. In the same year, the Milford marina was constructed at the mouth of the Wairau Creek. Two years later, the historic footbridge was demolished. Intended to be reconstructed soon afterwards, the Milford Cruising Club and members of the Takapuna Community Board blocked reconstruction. In 1975, the marina was expanded, which led to a boating industry developing at Milford.

In December 1994, the Milford Shopping Centre opened. It was sold to new proprietors in 2006, and covers 14,000 square metres (150,000 sq ft). It consists of 757 carparks and 65 retailers, including The Warehouse and a Woolworths supermarket.

In December 2015, the Wairau Stream Pedestrian Bridge was opened.

== Demographics ==
Milford covers 1.53 km^{2} (0.59 sq mi) and had an estimated population of 5,140 as of June 2025, with a population density of 3,359 people per km^{2}.

Historical population
Year	Pop.	±% p.a.
2006	4,773	—
2013	4,767	−0.02%
2018	5,019	+1.04%
2023	4,929	−0.36%

Milford had a population of 4,929 in the 2023 New Zealand census, a decrease of 90 people (−1.8%) since the 2018 census, and an increase of 162 people (3.4%) since the 2013 census. There were 2,304 males, 2,613 females and 15 people of other genders in 2,043 dwellings. 2.9% of people identified as LGBTIQ+. There were 735 people (14.9%) aged under 15 years, 738 (15.0%) aged 15 to 29, 2,226 (45.2%) aged 30 to 64, and 1,224 (24.8%) aged 65 or older.

People could identify as more than one ethnicity. The results were 71.3% European (Pākehā); 5.1% Māori; 1.4% Pasifika; 25.8% Asian; 3.4% Middle Eastern, Latin American and African New Zealanders (MELAA); and 1.7% other, which includes people giving their ethnicity as "New Zealander". English was spoken by 93.9%, Māori language by 0.7%, Samoan by 0.1%, and other languages by 28.3%. No language could be spoken by 1.5% (e.g. too young to talk). New Zealand Sign Language was known by 0.1%. The percentage of people born overseas was 40.9, compared with 28.8% nationally.

Religious affiliations were 34.4% Christian, 1.3% Hindu, 1.3% Islam, 0.1% Māori religious beliefs, 1.0% Buddhist, 0.2% New Age, 0.4% Jewish, and 1.1% other religions. People who answered that they had no religion were 53.4%, and 7.0% of people did not answer the census question.

Of those at least 15 years old, 1,806 (43.1%) people had a bachelor's or higher degree, 1,647 (39.3%) had a post-high school certificate or diploma, and 744 (17.7%) people exclusively held high school qualifications. 948 people (22.6%) earned over $100,000 compared to 12.1% nationally. The employment status of those at least 15 was that 1,962 (46.8%) people were employed full-time, 591 (14.1%) were part-time, and 69 (1.6%) were unemployed.

Individual statistical areas
Name	Area (km^{2})	Population	Density (per km^{2})	Dwellings	Median age	Median income
Milford West	0.83	2,997	3,611	1,167	41.6 years	$51,000
Milford Central	0.70	1,932	2,760	876	55.3 years	$53,800
New Zealand					38.1 years	$41,500

== Local government ==
The first local government in the area was the Lake Highway District, also known as the Takapuna Highway District, which began operating 1867. In June 1889 the road board was dissolved, in favour of Takapuna being under the direct control of the Waitemata County Council. The Borough of Takapuna was established on 1 July 1913, after 73% of electors in Takapuna voted for independence from the Waitemata County, which included Milford.

After significant growth in population, Takapuna Borough became Takapuna City in 1961. In 1989, Takapuna City was merged into the North Shore City. North Shore City was amalgamated into Auckland Council in November 2010.

Within the Auckland Council, Milford is a part of the Devonport-Takapuna local government area governed by the Devonport-Takapuna Local Board. It is a part of the North Shore ward, which elects two councillors to the Auckland Council. For national politics, Milford is part of the North Shore electorate, which is currently represented by National member of parliament Simon Watts.

== Notable people ==
- C. F. Goldie – artist
- Harry Lyon – musician, member of Hello Sailor
- Dave McArtney – musician, member of Hello Sailor and the Pink Flamingos
- Don McGlashan – musician, member of Blam Blam Blam and The Mutton Birds

== Amenities ==
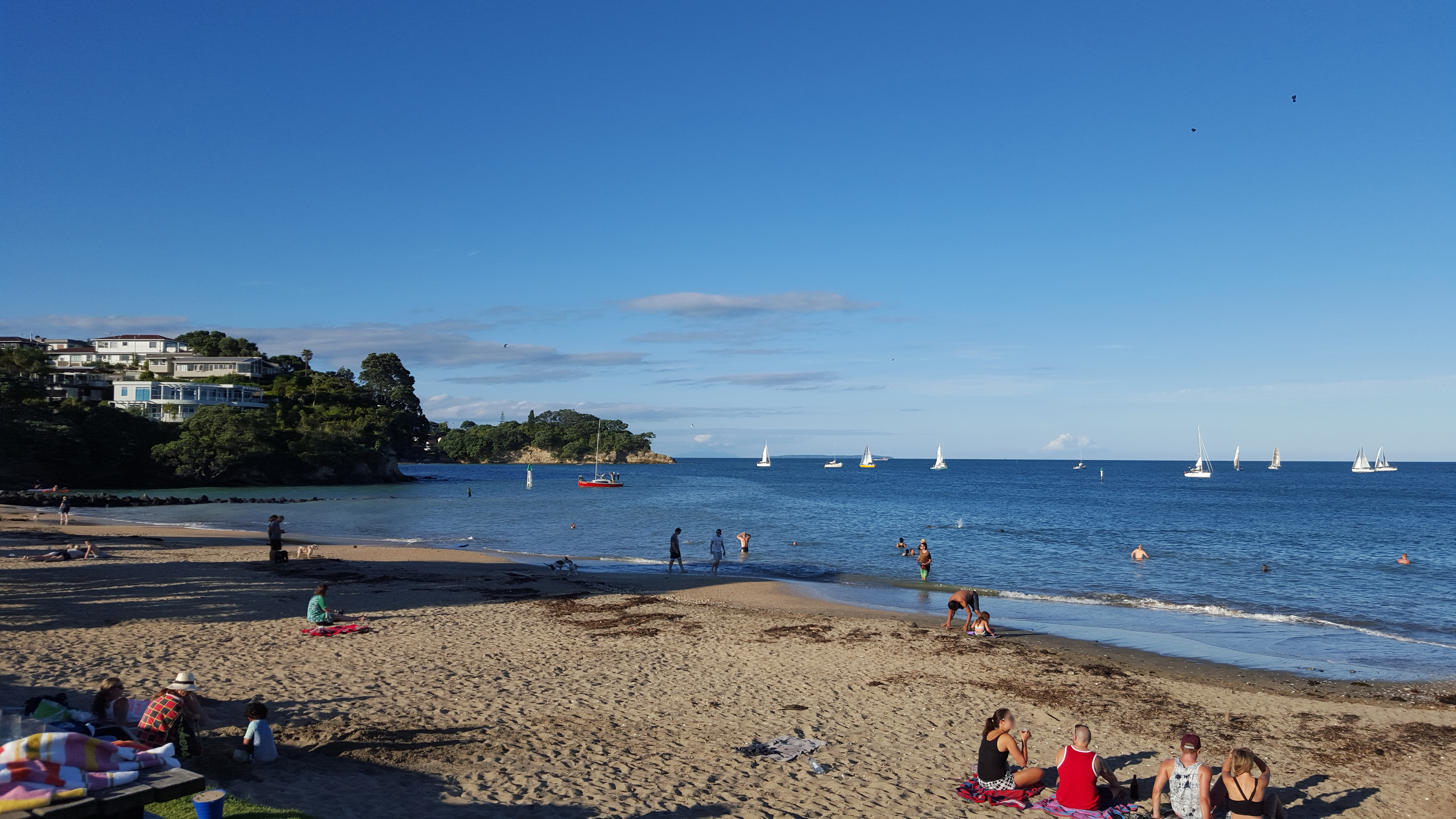
Milford Beach

- Milford Beach is one of the most popular beaches on the North Shore. By the 1920s, the beach had increased in popularity enough that the Milford Surf Life Saving Club was formed in 1926, followed by the Milford Girls Surf Club in 1937.
- Milford Marina, established in the Wairau Creek estuary in the 1960s.
- Milford Reserve is a public park in Milford, and the former location of the pirate ship dance hall. It is the home of the Milford Cruising Club, the Wairau Stream Pedestrian Bridge to Castor Bay, and Beacon, a 2020 sculpture by Cambodian-New Zealand artist Lang Ea.
- Lake Pupuke, a freshwater lake located between Milford and Takapuna. Sylvan Park is a nature reserve and park purchased in 1924, which features native karaka, pūriri, taraire and kōwhai trees. The park is a popular location for sailing and rowing events on the lake.
- Brian Byrnes Reserve, home to the Milford Bowling Club, established in 1975.
- Milford Centre, a shopping centre in Milford.
- St Paul's Anglican Church Milford. First holding services from 1914, the first church building in Milford was constructed in 1927. The current church was constructed in 1955.
- Milford Baptist Church
- Saint Vincent de Paul Church, a Catholic church constructed in 1949.

== Education ==
Carmel College is a girls' secondary (years 7–13) school with a roll of 1,100. It is a state integrated Catholic school, which was founded in 1957.

Milford School is a coeducational contributing primary (years 1–6) school with a roll of 563. It opened in 1926 as a spillover from Takapuna School, and became an independent school in 1946.

Milford School's roll has increased by about 150 students over the past two years. This growth has placed pressure on facilities, with RNZ reporting that spaces such as the library have been repurposed as classrooms.

Rolls are as of July 2026.

== Bibliography ==
- Bartlett, Jean (2001). Takapuna: People and Places (2nd ed.). Auckland: North Shore City Council. ISBN 978-0-473-07877-5. OCLC 973591276. Wikidata Q123755661.
- Christmas, Judith (1983), A History of Northcote, Northcote Borough Council, OCLC 154573998, Wikidata Q123591383
- McClure, Margaret (1987). The Story of Birkenhead. Birkenhead City Council. ISBN 0-908704-04-6. OL 33998949W. Wikidata Q120679112.
- Verran, David (2010), The North Shore: An Illustrated History, North Shore: Random House, OL 33434370W, Wikidata Q120520385
