= Lake Pupuke =

Lake in New Zealand

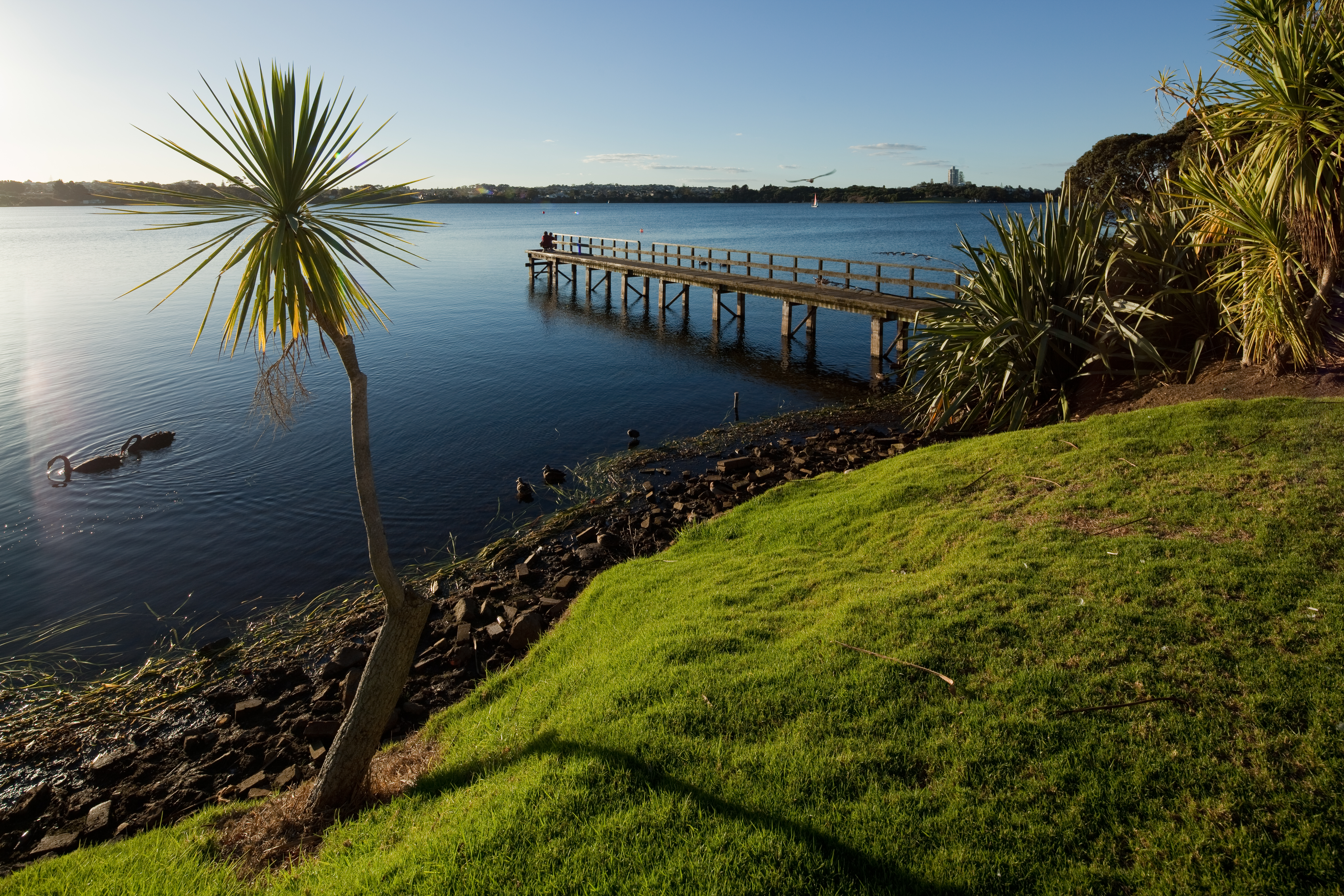
- Lake Pupuke in 2010
- Interactive map of Lake Pupuke
- Location: North Shore, Auckland, North Island, New Zealand
- Coordinates: 36.780115°S 174.766184°E
- Lake type: Crater lake
- Basin countries: New Zealand
- Max. depth: 57 m (187 ft)
- Settlements: Takapuna, Milford

Lake Pupuke (traditionally known in Māori as Pupukemoana) is a heart-shaped freshwater lake occupying a volcanic crater (or maar) between the suburbs of Takapuna and Milford on the North Shore of Auckland, New Zealand. The heart shape is a result of its formation by the linking of two circular craters – a larger one forming most of the lake and a smaller one forming the arm in the northeast. Separated from the sea by less than 200 m at one point, it has a circumference of about 4.5 km and reaches 57 m in depth. It is popular for recreational activities and the lakefront property around it.

== Geology ==
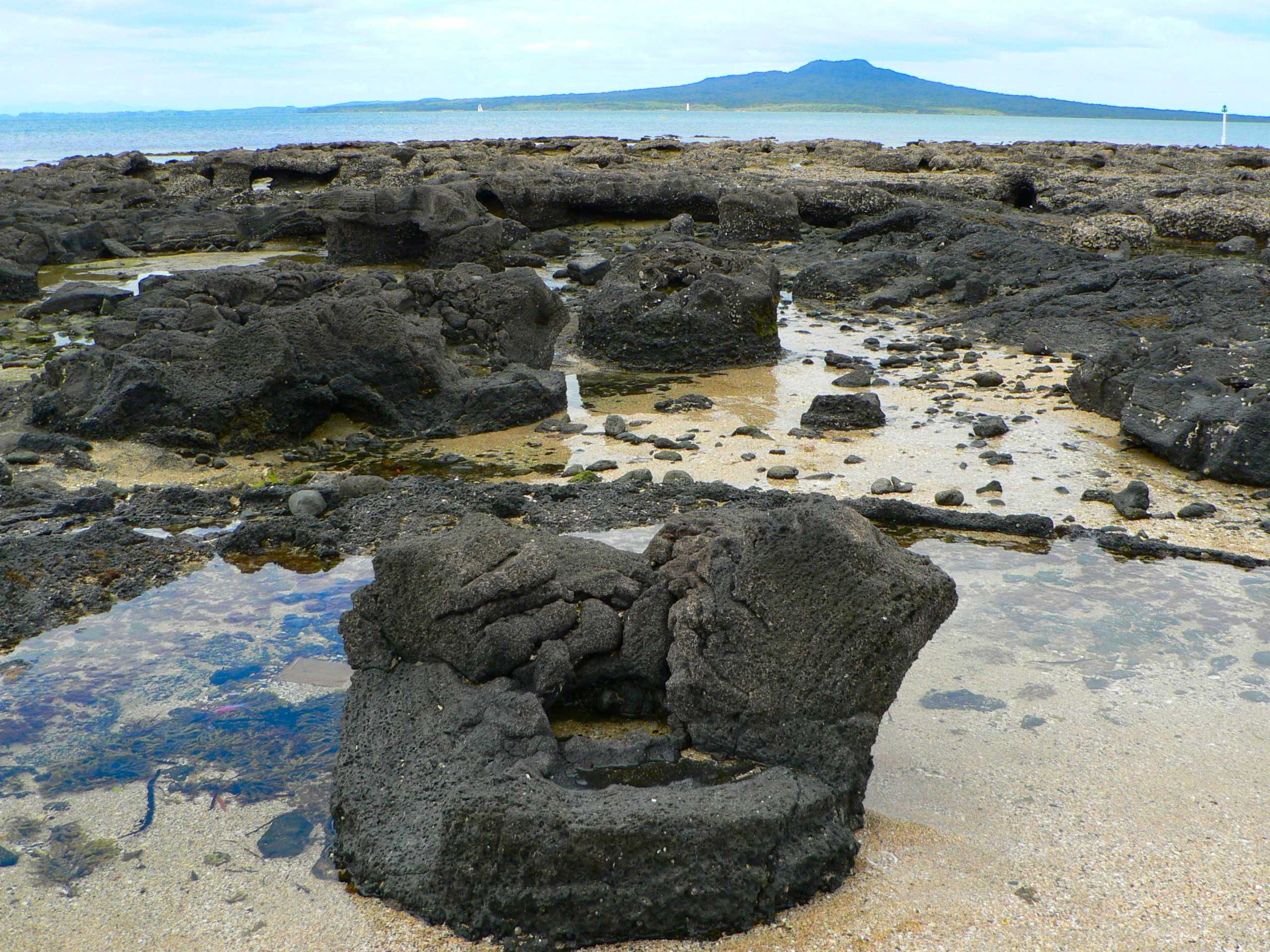
Takapuna Reef's exceptional fossil forest was exhumed by coastal erosion when the sea level rose to its current height, following the last Ice Age, 7,200 years ago

Lake Pupuke is one of the oldest known features of the Auckland volcanic field, erupting an estimated 193,200 years ago.

Other similar craters in the Auckland volcanic field were either buried by later eruptions, or breached by erosion as rainwater collected and overflowed the edge of the crater. Lake Pupuke remains a lake because, unlike the other vents, its eruptions produced substantial lava flows; water can thus escape through cracks in the lava reaching under the crater wall, creating a series of freshwater springs along the beaches between Takapuna and Milford. The lava flow at the end of Takapuna Beach enveloped a kauri forest, producing an internationally significant collection of tree moulds, which has been called "New Zealand’s only example of a fossil forest preserved in a lava flow" and which "ranks among the best examples in the world." Some moulds have escaped burial by the boat ramp and car park built on top of the lava, and can be viewed at low tide.

A small scoria cone existed to the west of Lake Pupuke, which was quarried during European settlement.

== History ==
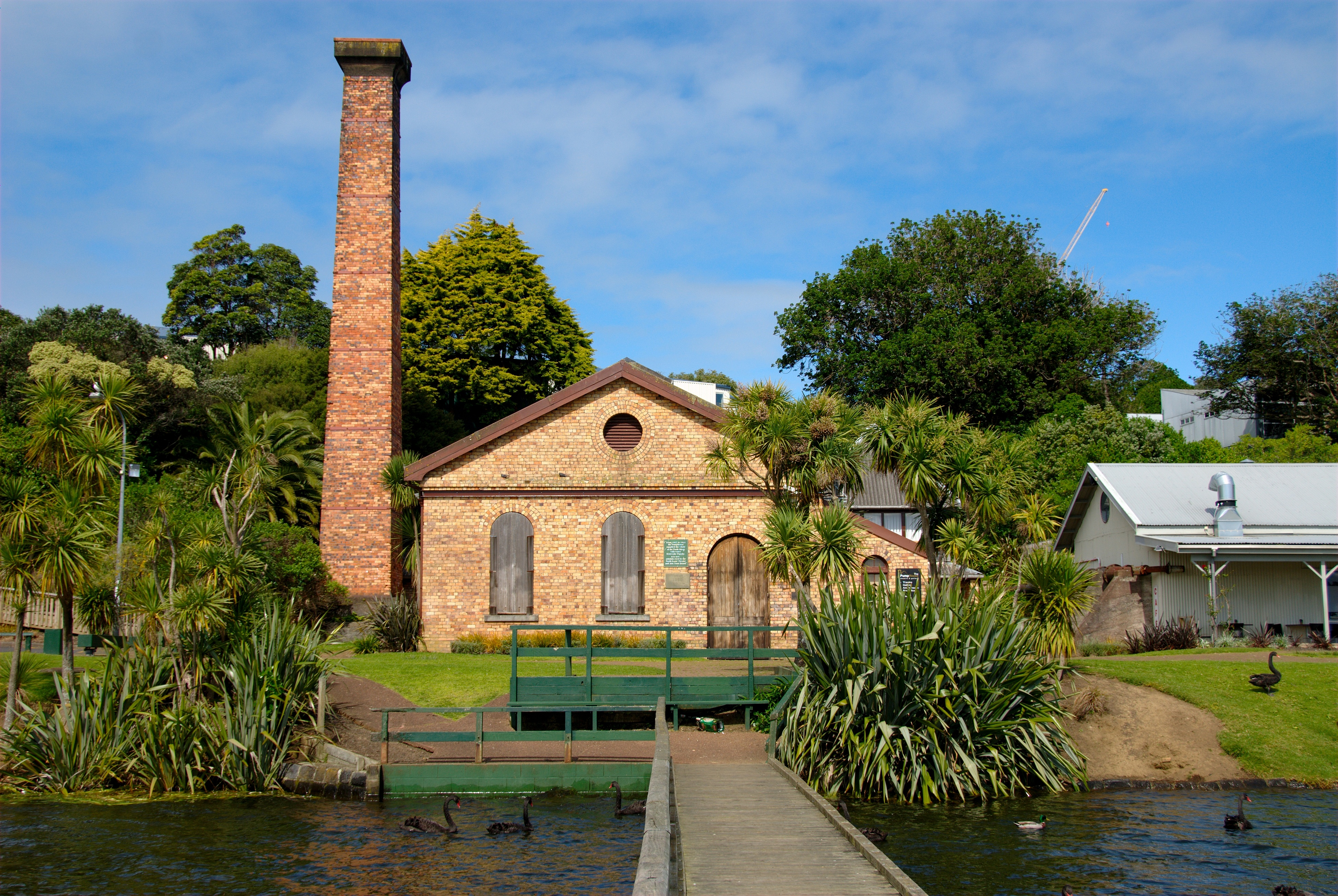
The historic pump house, now home to The PumpHouse Theatre

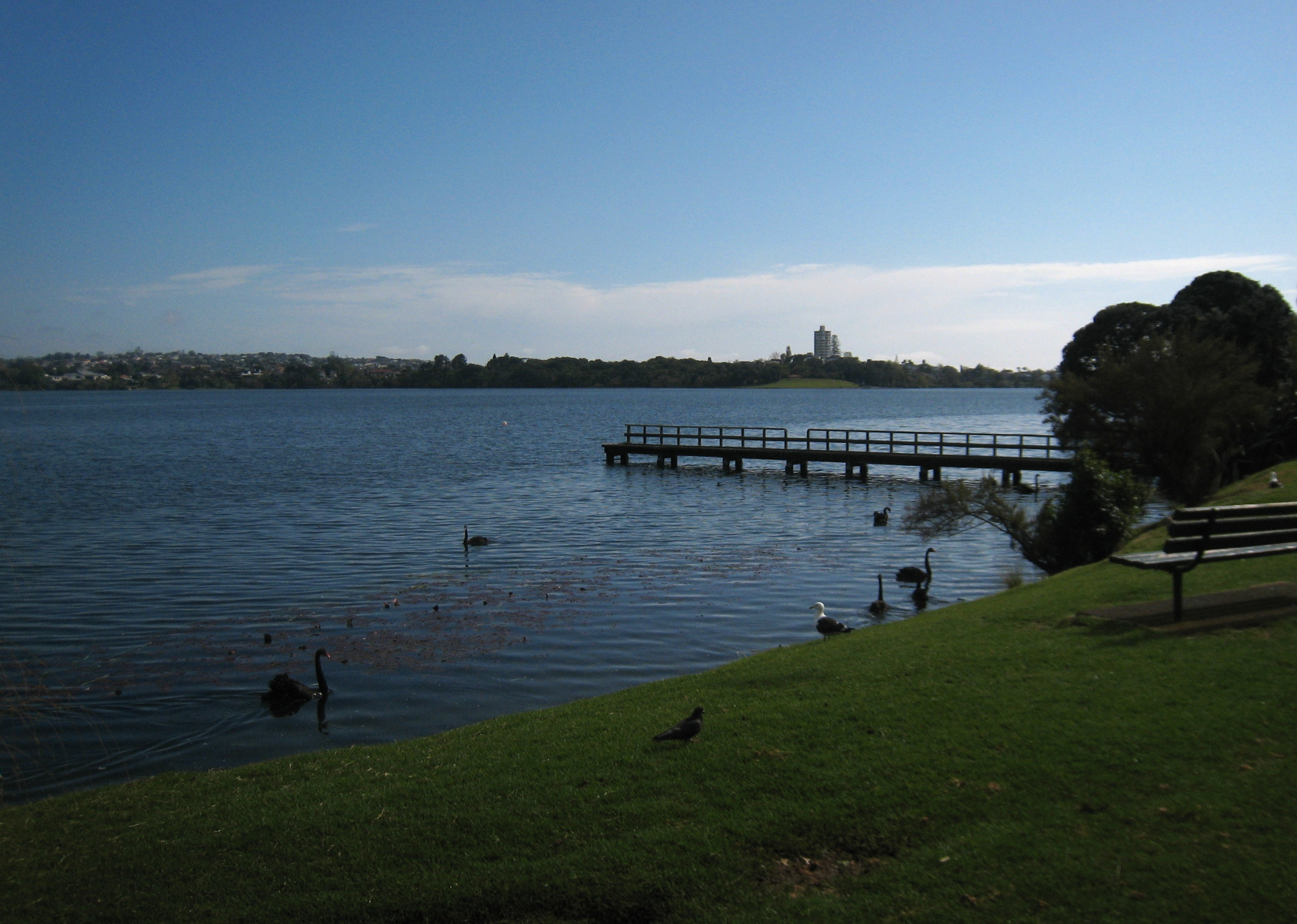
The lakeshore and jetty near the pump house

In 1894, a pump house was built on the shore of the lake to supply fresh water to the local area. This was replaced in 1906 by a second pump house. As a result of increasing demand, the water level of the lake fell and water quality decreased. The use of the lake as a fresh water supply was discontinued in 1944 when new supplies were sourced from reservoirs in the Waitākere Ranges. The second pump house has become a Category II protected building under the New Zealand Historic Places Trust in 1983. The building is now home to The PumpHouse Theatre with three performance spaces including an outdoor amphitheatre.

Introduced Vallisneria plants dominate much of the lake floor.

== Māori mythology ==
A Māori myth surrounding the lake tells of a tupua couple, children of the fire gods. After quarreling and cursing Mahuika, the fire-goddess, their home on the mainland was destroyed by Matahoe, god of earthquakes and eruptions, on Mahuika's behalf. Lake Pupuke resulted from the destruction, while Rangitoto Island rose from the sea as their exile. The mists surrounding Rangitoto at certain times are considered the tears of the tupua couple for their former home.

== Human use ==
Close to the Takapuna city centre, the lake is popular not only with wild birds (such as shags) but with picnickers, paddlers, kayakers, rowers, yachtsmen, divers, and windsurfers (lessons have been given on the lake). Free divers (no tanks) have practiced in the lake. College rowing crews use it. There have been boating races. and the Pupuke Boating Club operates there. Takapuna Boating Club hosts regattas.

The Auckland Dragon Boat Association runs an annual regionals race event on the lake, with 200m, 500m and 2 km races. The lake is the venue for Dragon Boat, Canoe sprints, Canoe marathon, and Waka Ama sprint racing within the Canoe Competition at the World Masters Games 2017 held in Auckland.

Lake Pupuke is suitable for swimming but is murky and contains thick vegetation, and there have been drownings. The lake has been tested for bacteria and generally meets safe swimming conditions.

In 2007, recreational fishing has become more prominent since rainbow trout were released into the lake from a fish hatchery. However, since there are no actual streams entering or leaving the lake, trout will not be able to reproduce naturally, and new trout will have to be released periodically. Other fish in the lake include tench, perch, rudd, and carp.

The crater wall has been quarried in several places, most intensely on the western side between Shea Terrace and Rangitira Avenue, where Smales Quarry continues to operate. A long thin lagoon called Quarry Lake has been formed there by flooding a former quarry area.

Lakeside real estate is expensive. Empty lakefront land is rare; one (almost 1,200-square meter) undeveloped parcel cost $2.7 million in 2008. Lake Pupuke is identified as a "high risk" area in the event of a tsunami, and a high-tech phone alert system was developed for North Shore residents in case of an emergency.
