= Takapuna Fossil Forest =

Fossil forest in Auckland, New Zealand

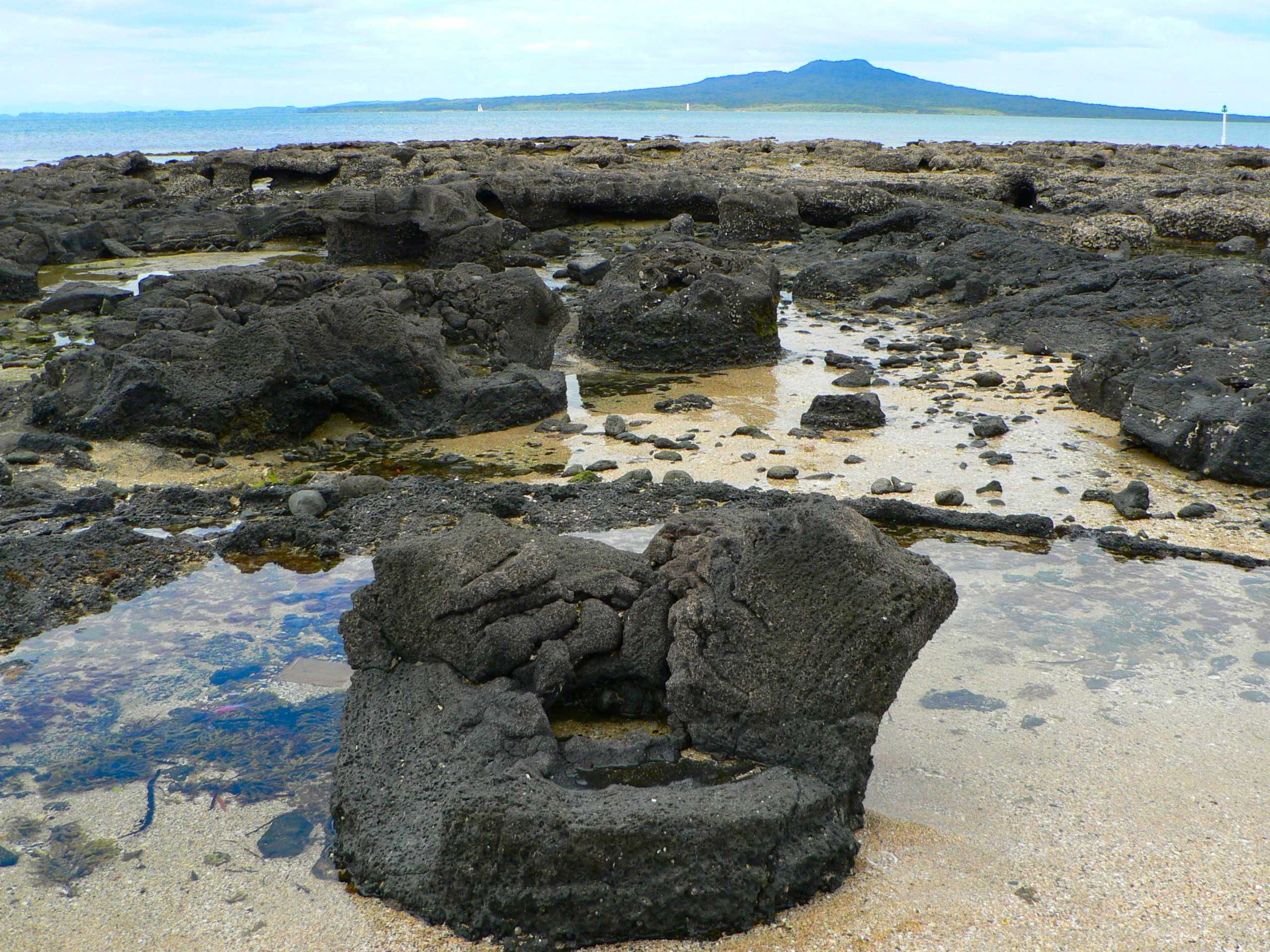
- Takapuna Fossil Forest with Rangitoto Island in the background
- Interactive map of Takapuna Fossil Forest
- Location: North Shore
- Nearest city: Auckland
- Coordinates: 36°47′01″S 174°46′38″E

The Takapuna Fossil Forest is a geographical feature located along the coastline between Takapuna Beach and Thorne Beach in Auckland, New Zealand. It consists of a series of basalt rock formations, which are the result of lava flows through an ancient forest. It is believed to be New Zealand's most well-preserved fossil forest.

== Geography ==
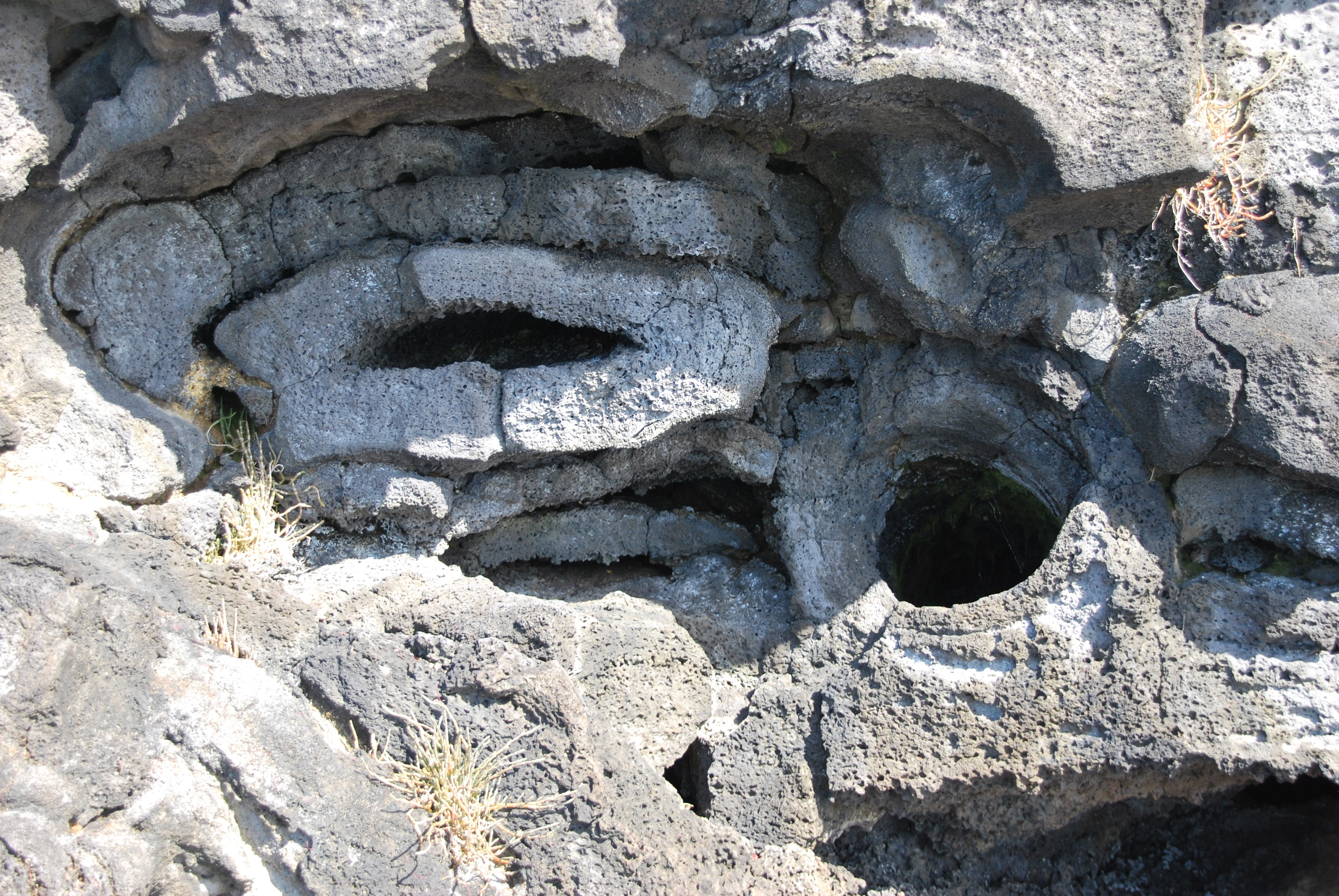
Petrified tree trunks in the Takapuna Fossil Forest

The Takapuna Fossil Forest was once a coastal kauri, podocarp and broadleaved forest near the Pupuke Volcano (now a crater lake). At this time, the sea level was much lower than in the present day.

Approximately 190,000 years ago, the Pupuke Volcano erupted. This eruption sent two distinct lava flows through the forest, burning vegetation and encasing the lower 1–2 metres of the tree trunks in lava. The lava solidified into basalt rock, preserving the rounded shape of the trunks. These formations were buried by ash deposits from subsequent eruptions, but have been exposed over the past 7,000 years due to coastal erosion. Some of the trunk formations within the Takapuna Fossil Forest are also connected via arches, where the upper crust of the lava solidified while the lava flow beneath it drained out. Additionally, there are basalt formations in the shape of horizontal logs, where fallen trees were encased in the lava. The majority of these log formations are aligned towards East-Southeast, indicating that this was the direction of the lava flow. The Takapuna Fossil Forest also contains remnants of Lava Blisters. These rock formations occur when gasses rise within the lava, leaving rounded bumps at the edge of the rock formation. Allen and Smith suggest that the prevalence of these formations within the Takapuna Lava Forest may be the result of excess methane released by the burning vegetation.

The Takapuna Fossil Forest is now situated upon a reef.

== History ==
The formation, burial and re-erosion of the Takapuna Fossil Forest pre-date human arrival in New Zealand (based on Hayward's assessment that they have been exposed in the last 7,000 years).

In the 1970s, prior to the Resource Management Act, a large portion of the Takapuna Fossil Forest was destroyed to facilitate the construction of a carpark and boat ramp.

In 2006, works were carried out to fill in cavities within the fossil forest and its surrounding coastline. This was done to protect the coast from further erosion, as a sewerage pipe runs along the coastline and was at risk of collapsing causing pollution and damage to the fossil forest. A specific concrete was used to ensure that the infill matched its natural surroundings.

In 2014, remnants of another fossil forest were uncovered on Takapuna Beach. These formations were believed to be older than the pre-existing Takapuna Fossil Forest.

The Takapuna Fossil Forest was included within the 'Outstanding Natural Features' overlay in the Auckland Unitary Plan.

== Gallery ==
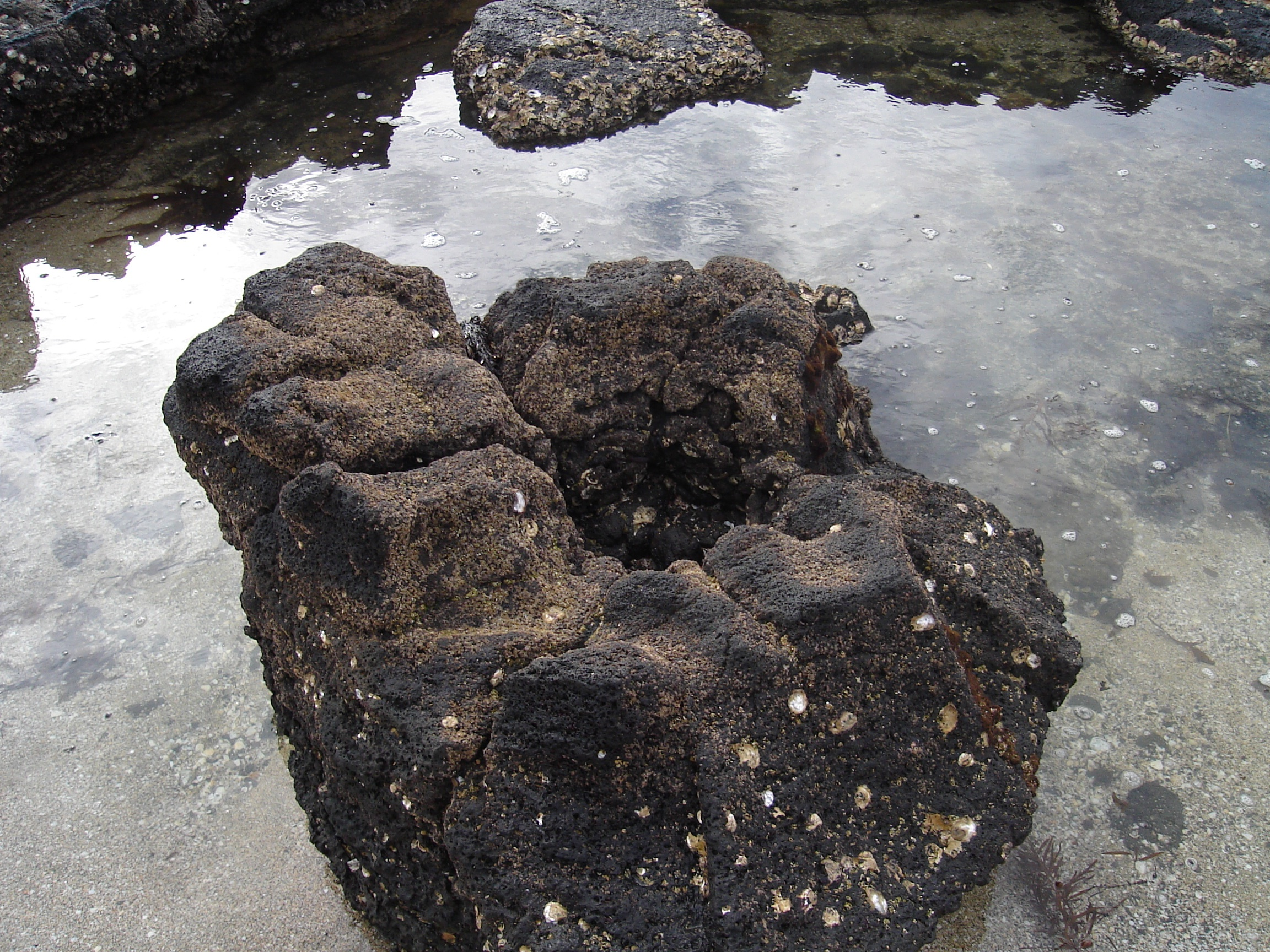
Basalt cast of a tree trunk within the Takapuna Fossil Forest

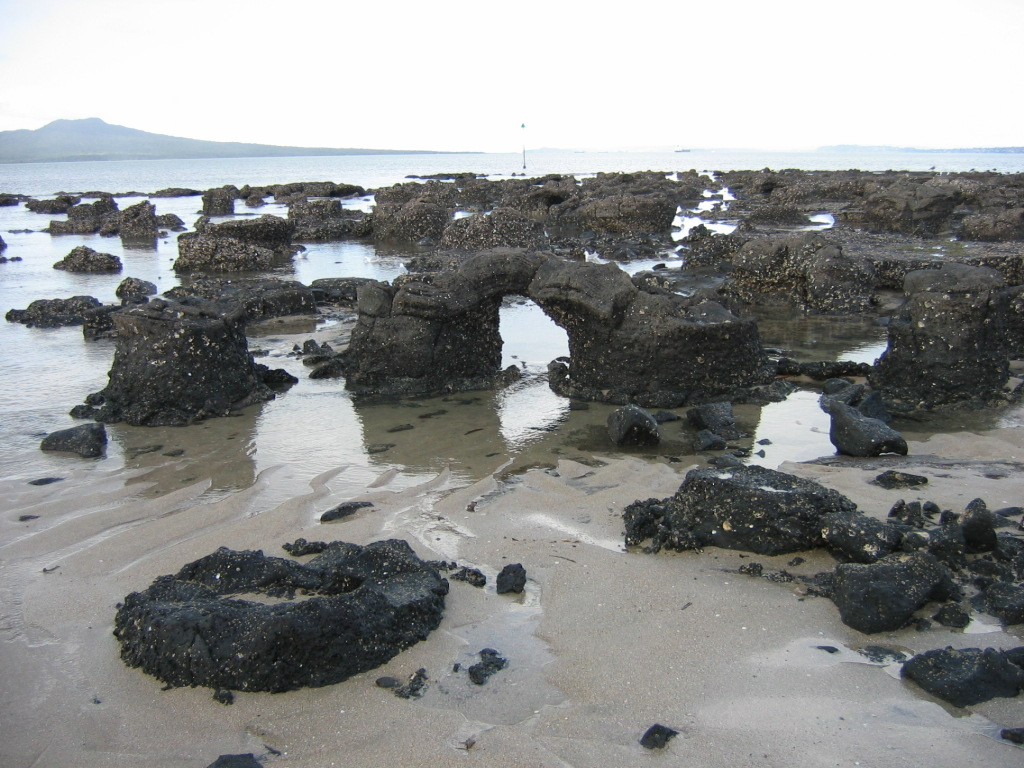
Arch formation within the Takapuna Fossil Forest

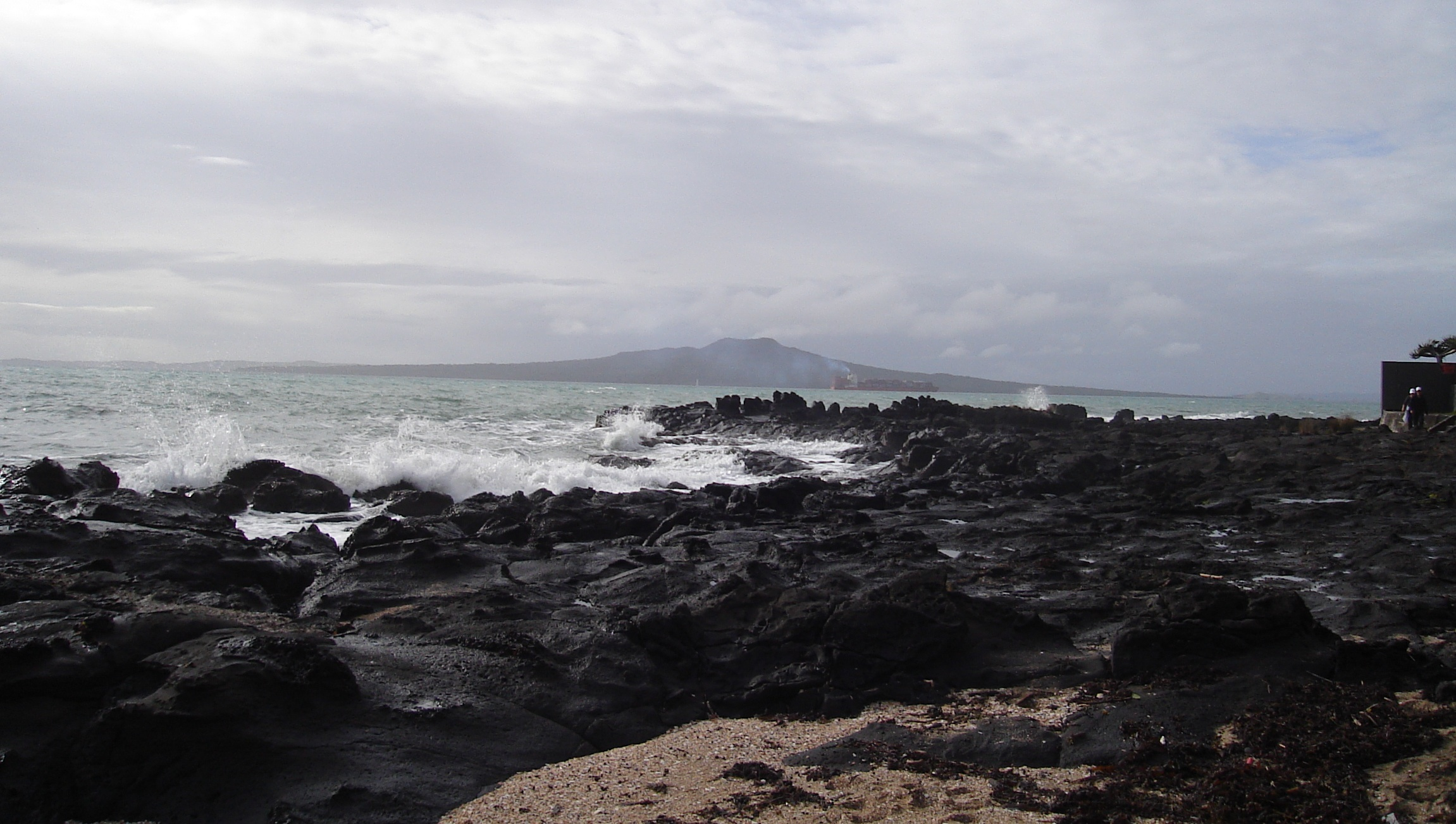
Thornes Bay end of the Takapuna Fossil Forest
