= William Blomfield =

New Zealand cartoonist and local politician

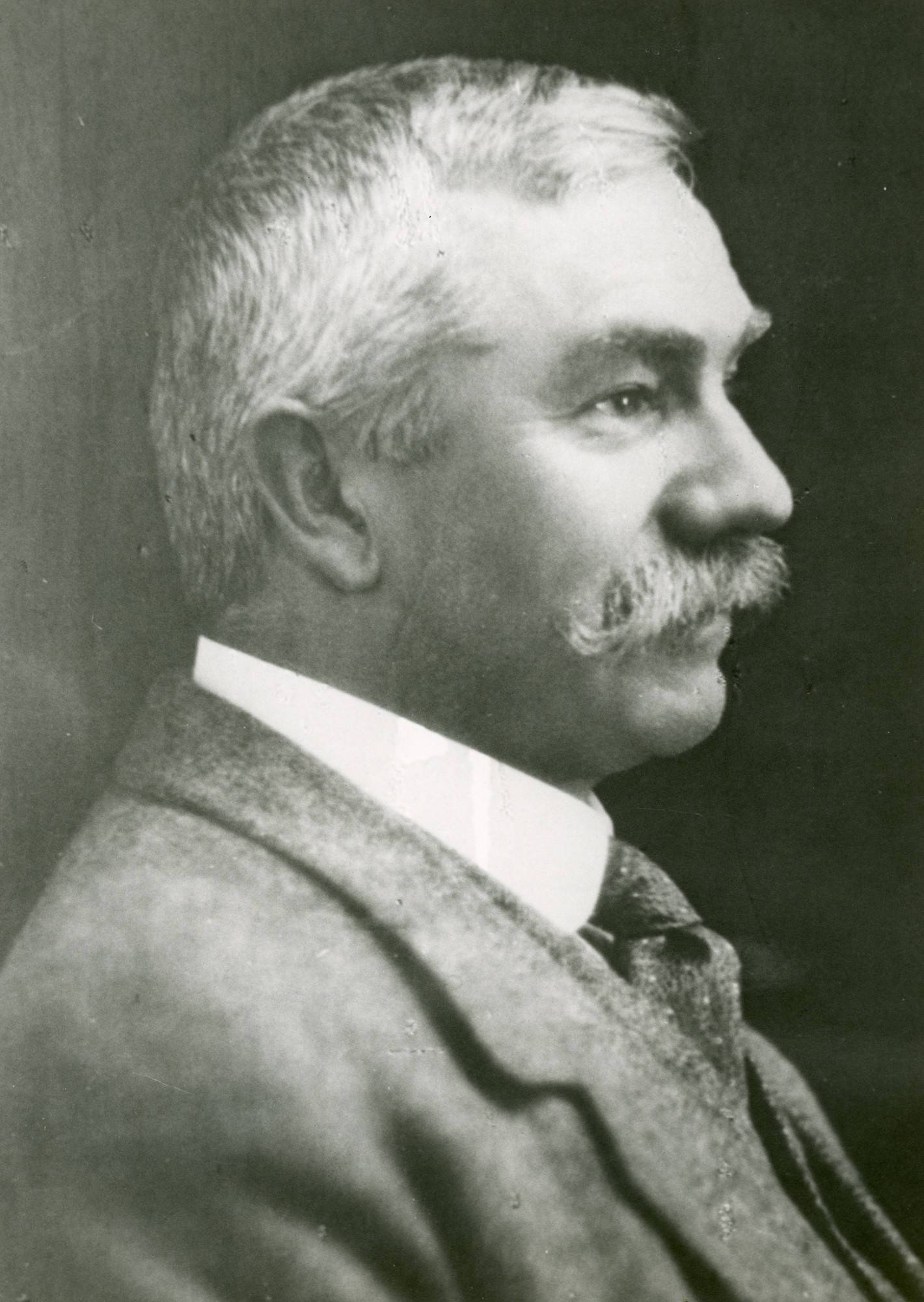
Blomfield in 1914

William Blomfield (1 April 1866 – 2 March 1938) was a New Zealand cartoonist and local politician. He was born in Auckland, New Zealand on 1 April 1866. Between 1914 and 1921 he was the second Mayor of Takapuna.

He produced cartoons for various publications including the Observer (later the New Zealand Observer), the New Zealand Herald, and Free Lance. He produced cartoons for the Observer from 1887 until shortly before his death in 1938. He was also a part-owner of the Observer from 1892.

In 1935, he was awarded the King George V Silver Jubilee Medal.
