= Torpedo Bay, New Zealand =

Bay of the Waitematā Harbour, New Zealand

Torpedo Bay
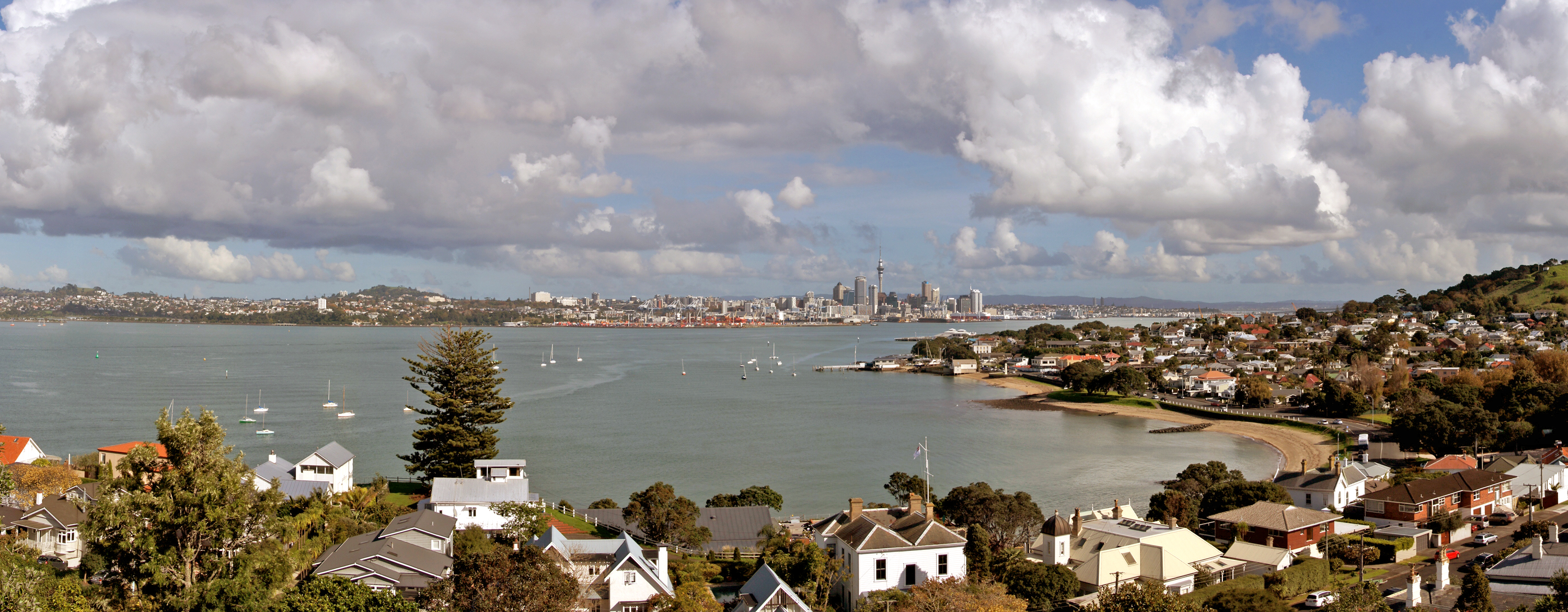
- View of Torpedo Bay from Devonport

- Location within the Auckland region
- Location: Auckland Region, New Zealand
- Coordinates: 36.830°S 174.806°E
- Ocean/sea sources: Pacific Ocean
- Settlements: Devonport

Torpedo Bay (Māori: Te Hau Kapua) is a bay on the southern coast of Devonport, New Zealand between North Head (Maungauika) and Devonport Beach, close to the mouth of the Waitematā Harbour. The bay is home to the Torpedo Bay Navy Museum.

== History ==
=== Early history ===
There have been people in Torpedo Bay as early as 925 CE, as the area is believed to have been a landing point of Kupe and his waka. They spent some time in the bay and the people who were left there by Kupe when he returned to Hawaiki are considered the first settlers of New Zealand. In about 1150, Toi te Huatahi, following Kupe's directions, also landed there. Uika, Toi te Huatahi's grandson, also landed there, and settled permanently on North Head (Maungauika).

By the late 18th century, Ngāti Paoa had established a kāinga at Torpedo Bay. The settlement existed into the mid-19th century, and was known for potato gardens, cabbages, pig farming, and as a place where shark meat was suspended to dry.

=== Early European history ===
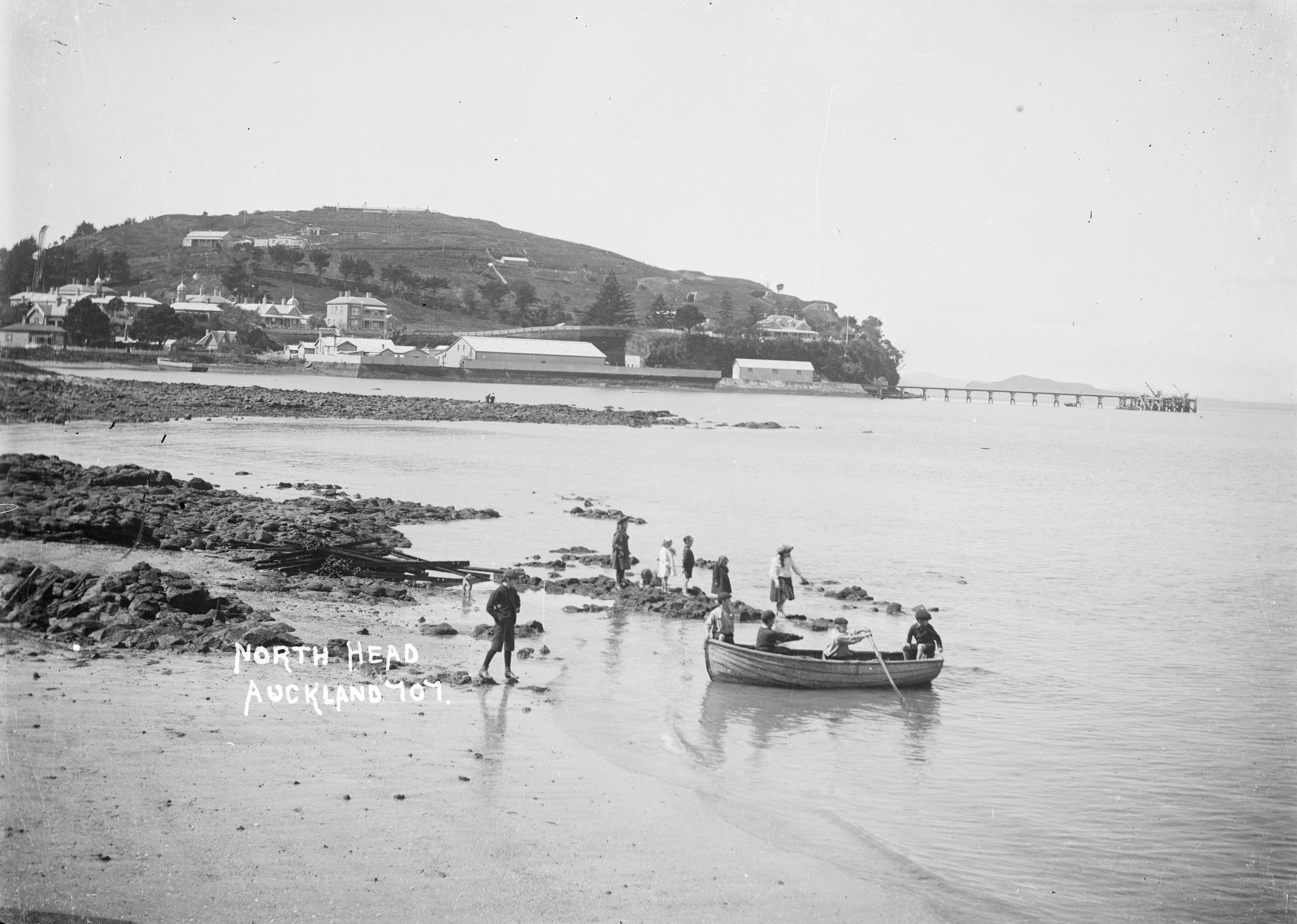
View of Torpedo Bay looking towards North Head, c. 1909–1910

In 1827, French explorer Jules Dumont d'Urville, anchored the Astrolabe at Torpedo Bay, becoming the earliest known European to visit the area. Lottin, the ship's surveyor, climbed Takarunga / Mount Victoria, and noted the pā fortifications, huts and stonefield gardens in the area. On 9 July 1863, due to fears of the Māori King Movement, Governor Grey proclaimed that all Māori living in the South Auckland area needed to swear loyalty to the Queen and give up their weapons, immediately prior to the Invasion of the Waikato. European residents reported that the kāinga at Torpedo Bay was evacuated overnight.

The Duder Brothers owned Duder's Wharf at Torpedo Bay, where goods, including coal for their brickworks, were shipped by scow. This area was the commercial centre of Devonport until the late 1860's. Duder's Wharf also functioned as a major ferry terminal until 1904, the wharf closed in 1907 or 1908.
