= Tipua =

Spirit in Maori mythology

In Māori mythology, tipua or tupua are a type of differing shaped and often shape-shifting spirit or "uncanny thing". Tipua were often associated with natural landmarks or phenomena but could also be more common objects; sometimes even trees and rocks were associated as these types of spirits.
