= North Shore, New Zealand =

Subregion of Auckland, New Zealand

North Shore
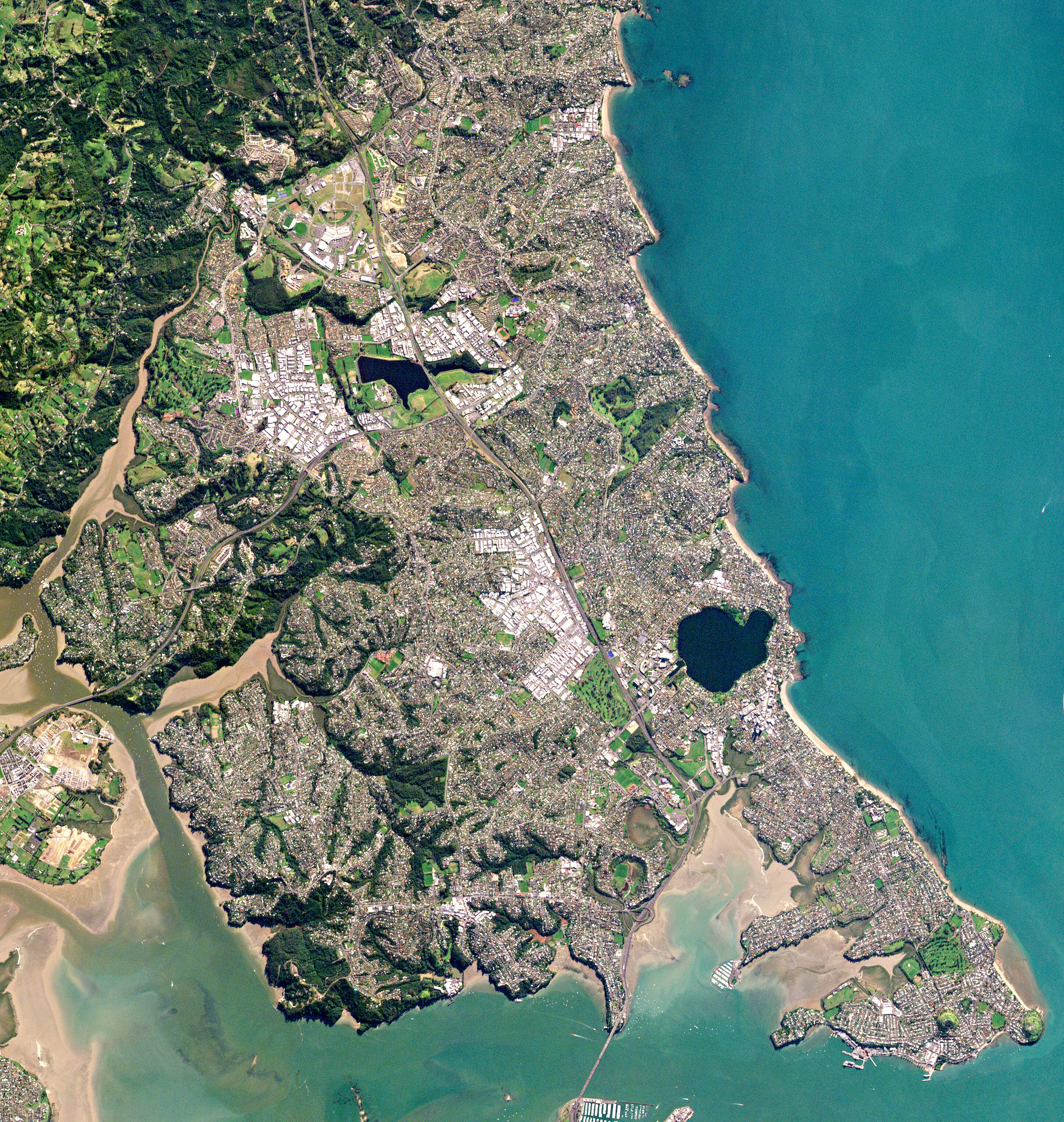
- The North Shore captured by a Planet Labs satellite in 2016
- Interactive map of North Shore
- Coordinates: 36°46′S 174°44′E
- Country: New Zealand
- Island: North Island
- Region: Auckland Region

Government
  - MPs: Dan Bidois (National); Cameron Brewer (National); Erica Stanford (National); Simon Watts (National)

Area
  - Total: 116.64 km^{2} (45.03 sq mi)

Population (June 2025)
  - Total: 261,137
  - Density: 2,238.8/km^{2} (5,798.5/sq mi)

The North Shore (Māori: Te Whenua Roa ō Kahu or Te Raki Paewhenua) is one of the major geographical regions of Auckland, the largest city in New Zealand. The area is defined as the northern shores of the Waitematā Harbour as far north as the Ōkura River.

The North Shore is primarily uplifted Waitemata Group sandstone from the Miocene, and includes the northernmost features of the Auckland volcanic field, such as Lake Pupuke—the oldest known feature of the field. Settled by Tāmaki Māori in the 13th or 14th centuries, the Waitematā Harbour headlands became important places for harvesting seasonal resources and for controlling transportation across the region. European settlers arrived in the North Shore in the 1840s, and by the turn of the 20th century, the inland area has become a hub for fruit growing, while the eastern coast had developed into a tourism destination for Aucklanders.

The North Shore rapidly suburbanised after the construction of the Auckland Harbour Bridge in 1959, and by 1989 the five local authorities in the area amalgamated to create North Shore City, which existed until 2010.

== Definition and etymology ==
The name North Shore has been used in English as far back as 1843, and has traditionally been defined as the area north of the Waitematā Harbour as far as Lucas Creek and Ōkura River. Other areas referred to as part of the North Shore include Pāremoremo, Lucas Heights. Ōkura and Redvale, rural villages located between metropolitan Auckland and the Hibiscus Coast, are considered a part of the North Shore. Major centres on the North Shore include Albany, Birkenhead, Browns Bay, Devonport, Glenfield, Northcote and Takapuna.

Te Whenua Roa o Kahu and Te Raki Paewhenua are the two most commonly used Māori names for the North Shore. Te Whenua Roa o Kahu (lit. 'The Greater Lands of Kahu') name refers to Kahu, the granddaughter of Maki, the namesake ancestor of the iwi Te Kawerau ā Maki. Kahu was among the members of Te Kawerau ā Maki who was based on the North Shore. Te Raki Paewhenua is a name that has been in use since at least the 1980s, and is found in the names of organisations such as Te Kura Kaupapa Māori o Te Raki Paewhenua, Te Raki Paewhenua Committee, and the health and social service organisation Te Puna Hauora o te Raki Paewhenua.

In the mid-19th century, Māori-language texts predominantly use the names Takapuna, or Awataha, to describe the North Shore. Takapuna, a name originally given to a spring at Maungauika / North Head, had gradually grown to refer to the wider southern North Shore area before the early colonial era.

== Geology ==
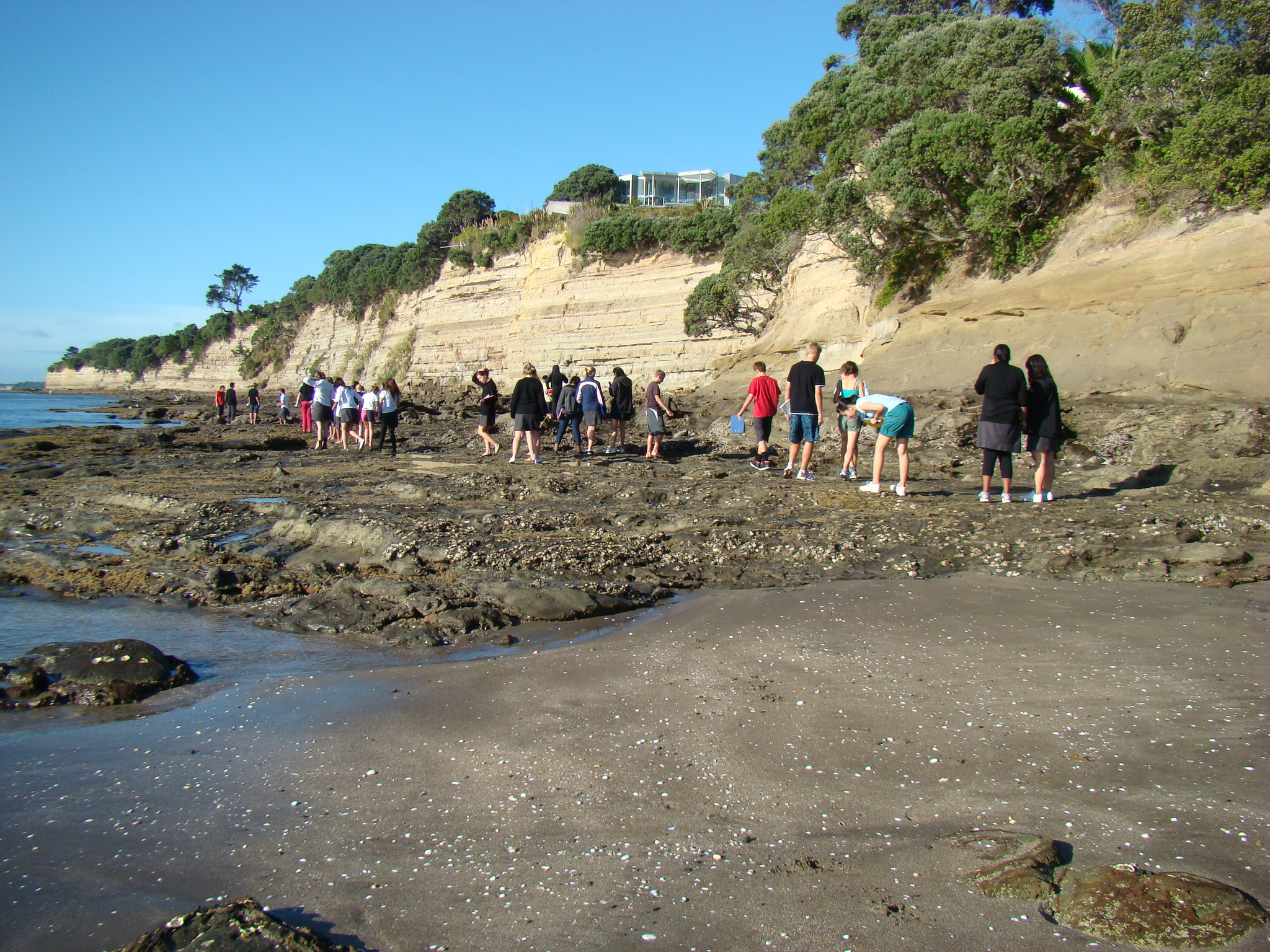
Geology trip at Waiake, showing exposed Waitemata Group sandstone cliffs

The North Shore is primarily uplifted Waitemata Group sandstone, that was deposited on the sea floor during the Early Miocene, between 22 and 16 million years ago, and uplifted due to tectonic forces. The sedimentary layers of Waitemata sandstone can be clearly seen in the eroding cliff faces of the bays along the Hauraki Gulf. Basement rocks in the area are greywacke and argillite, and a number of the headlands are formed from harder Parnell grit rocks, produced by lahars during the Miocene. The North Shore and wider Rodney area feature small areas of Albany Conglomerate rock.

=== Volcanic features ===
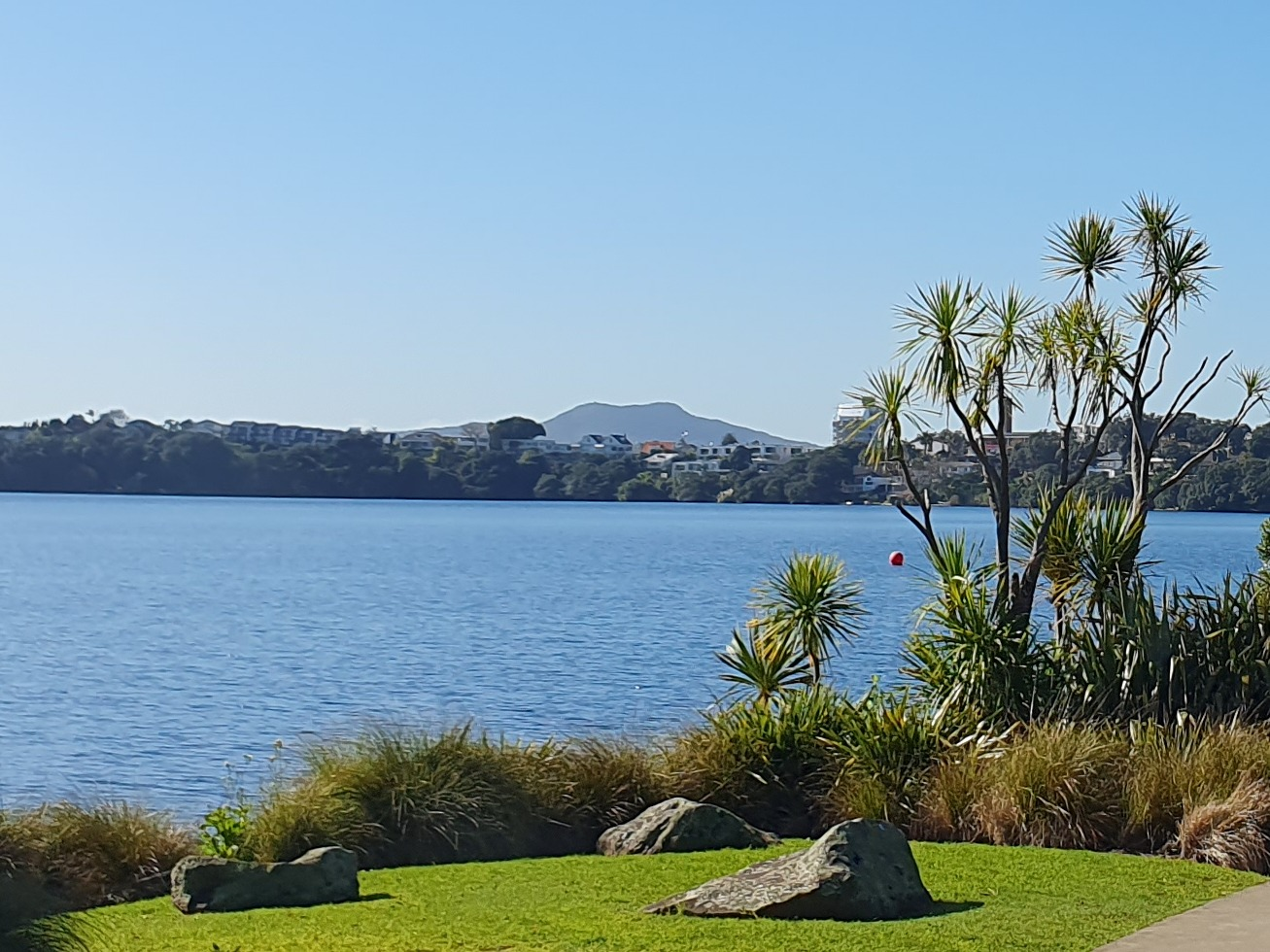
Lake Pupuke is a volcanic maar and the oldest known feature of the Auckland volcanic field, while Rangitoto Island (background) is the youngest

The North Shore is home to the northernmost features of the Auckland volcanic field. Lake Pupuke, a volcanic maar located in Takapuna, is one of the oldest known features of the Auckland volcanic field, erupting an estimated 193,200 years ago. During the eruption of Lake Pupuke, two lava flows travelled eastwards through the area, burning vegetation and encasing the lower 1–2 metres of the tree trunks in lava. The lava solidified into basalt rock, creating the Takapuna Fossil Forest, which was exposed an estimated 7,000 years ago due to coastal erosion.

There are two volcanic maars found on the eastern coastline of Northcote: Tank Farm, also known as Tuff Crater or Te Kōpua ō Matakamokamo, joined to the south by Onepoto (also known as Te Kōpua ō Matakerepo). Onepoto and Tank Farm erupted an estimated 187,600 and 181,000 years ago respectively.

Three volcanic features can be found at Devonport: Takarunga / Mount Victoria, the highest volcano on the North Shore at 81 metres (266 ft), and Maungauika / North Head, the south-east headland of the North Shore located at the mouth of the Waitematā Harbour. The third feature, Takararo / Mount Cambria, was quarried in tis entirety by the 1970s. Of these three features, Maungauika / North Head is significantly older, dated to approximately 87,000 years ago. Takararo / Mount Cambria is estimated to have erupted 43,000 years ago, while Takarunga / Mount Victoria erupted approximately 35,000 years ago.

While not located on the North Shore, the 260 metres (850 ft) Rangitoto Island, dominates the horizon for many of the bays along the eastern coast. The island is the youngest feature of the field, having erupted around the year 1,500.

== Geography ==
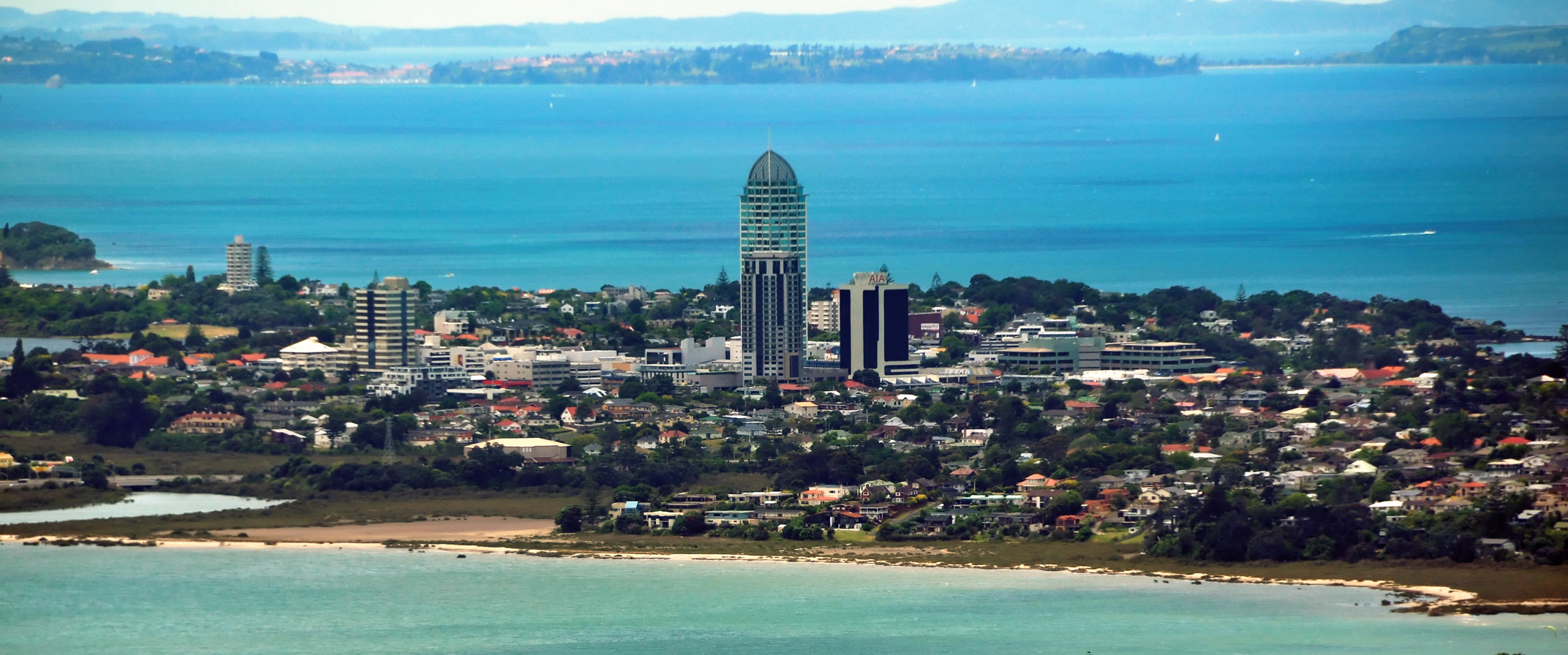
Takapuna, suburb of North Shore

The North Shore comprises a large suburban area to the north of Downtown Auckland; linked to the rest of the Greater Auckland metropolitan area by two harbour bridges – the Auckland Harbour Bridge crosses the inner Waitematā Harbour to the Auckland isthmus and Auckland City Centre, while the Upper Harbour Bridge on State Highway 18 provides a connection to West Auckland, across the Upper Waitematā Harbour.

Three major estuaries of the Waitematā Harbour flow through the North Shore. Oruamo or Hellyers Creek flows through the central west North Shore, separating Glenfield and Beach Haven from Greenhithe in the north-west. Further to the north is Lucas Creek, which separates Greenhithe from Pāremoremo. Shoal Bay is found to the south, which separates Northcote from Takapuna and Devonport in the east. To the east of Shoal Bay is the Devonport peninsula. The southern Devonport peninsula was formerly a presque-isle, only joined to the mainland at Narrow Neck by a small spit, until much of Ngataringa Bay was reclaimed for the Waitemata Golf Course in the 1870s. Traditional histories tell that during king tides, the tombolo was completely submerged.

The highest point on the North Shore is a 143 metres (469 ft) hill (A9L5) in the Albany hills, which is the origin point of the Ōkura River. The highest point in metropolitan North Shore is an 88 metres (289 ft) hill (A5X2) to on Pupuke Road in Northcote, referred informally by residents in the early 20th century as Clay Hill. The hill is the location of the Pupuke Road Reservoir and Pump Station.

=== Climate ===
Climate data for North Shore (Albany) (64m, 1991-2020)
Month	Jan	Feb	Mar	Apr	May	Jun	Jul	Aug	Sep	Oct	Nov	Dec	Year
Mean daily maximum °C (°F)	23.3 (73.9)	23.8 (74.8)	22.4 (72.3)	20.2 (68.4)	17.9 (64.2)	15.5 (59.9)	14.5 (58.1)	15.1 (59.2)	16.3 (61.3)	17.7 (63.9)	19.4 (66.9)	21.3 (70.3)	19.0 (66.1)
Daily mean °C (°F)	19.1 (66.4)	19.8 (67.6)	18.2 (64.8)	16.0 (60.8)	13.8 (56.8)	11.8 (53.2)	10.6 (51.1)	11.2 (52.2)	12.6 (54.7)	13.8 (56.8)	15.4 (59.7)	17.4 (63.3)	15.0 (59.0)
Mean daily minimum °C (°F)	15.0 (59.0)	15.7 (60.3)	14.0 (57.2)	11.8 (53.2)	9.8 (49.6)	8.0 (46.4)	6.6 (43.9)	7.2 (45.0)	8.8 (47.8)	9.9 (49.8)	11.3 (52.3)	13.5 (56.3)	11.0 (51.7)
Average rainfall mm (inches)	67.0 (2.64)	65.4 (2.57)	87.5 (3.44)	92.6 (3.65)	118.0 (4.65)	134.0 (5.28)	145.4 (5.72)	125.9 (4.96)	106.4 (4.19)	88.8 (3.50)	70.9 (2.79)	87.5 (3.44)	1,189.4 (46.83)

== Flora ==
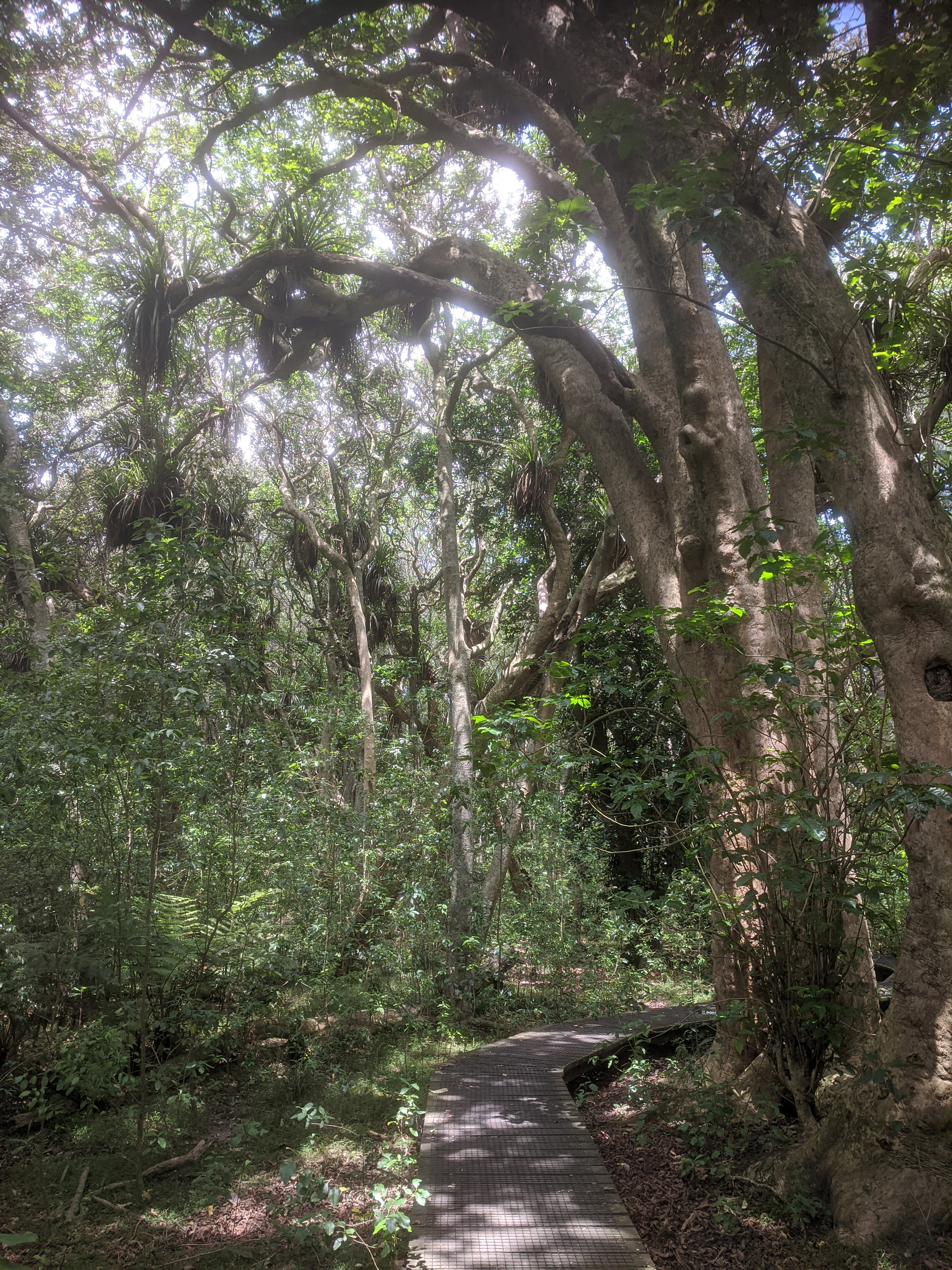
Smith's Bush is a remnant kahikatea and taraire forest located on the North Shore

Prior to human settlement, the inland North Shore area was primarily a northern broadleaf podocarp forest, dominated by kauri, tōtara, mataī, miro and kahikatea trees. Pōhutukawa trees were a major feature of the coastline. By the 19th century, much of the North Shore was primarily scrubland, vegetated by plants such as mānuka, tutu, harakeke flax and ferns.

Some kauri remnant forest remains in areas around Birkenhead, including Kauri Park and Le Roys Bush, while Smiths Bush in the Onewa Domain is a remnant native forest dominated by kahikatea and taraire trees. Fernhill Escarpment in Albany is a remnant forest which had tōtara trees estimated to be 800 years old.

In 1974, Graeme Platt established the first commercial native plant nursery in New Zealand. Many of his plants were local to the Albany area, meaning many native plants across New Zealand planted in the 1970s and 1980s originate from North Shore forests. This includes the tōtara cultivar Aurea, also known by the name Albany Gold.

== History ==
=== Māori history ===
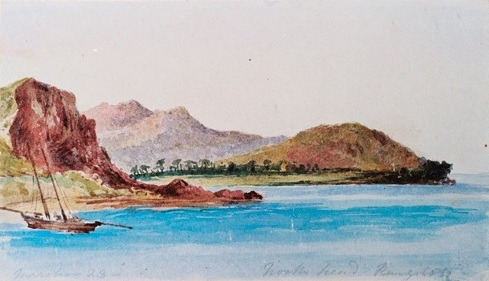
The Tainui migratory canoe visited Maungauika / North Head around the year 1350 (watercolour by Caroline Harriet Abraham in the 1850s).

Tāmaki Māori settlement of the Auckland Region began around the 13th or 14th centuries. The Devonport area was one of the earliest settled in the region, known to be settled by Tāmaki Māori ancestor Peretū. Toi-te-huatahi and his followers settled and intermarried with these early peoples. Around the year 1350, the Tainui migratory canoe visited the North Shore, stopping at the freshwater spring southwest of Maungauika / North Head, and at the Waiake Lagoon (Deep Creek).

Boat Rock (Te Nihokiore, "The Rat's Tooth") in the Waitematā Harbour southwest of Birkenhead was a location of great significance to Tāmaki Māori. The rock was the location where Te Arawa chief Kahumatamomoe placed a mauri stone (a stone of religious significance), naming the Waitematā ("The Waters of the Stone") after the stone.

Over time, many of the early Tāmaki Māori people of the North Shore identified as Ngā Oho. While the poor soils of the central North Shore acted as a barrier to agriculture and settlement, people settled the coastal margins, most notably the volcanic south-east, Long Bay (Te Oneroa ō Kahu), Kauri Point in Chatswood, and Tauhinu at Greenhithe. Stonefield gardens were constructed on the volcanic hills to the south-east, where crops such as uwhi yam, Taro and kūmara.

An ara (traditional path) connected Lucas Creek and the Ōkura River. This was used as a portage, where waka could be hauled overland between the two bodies of water. Numerous archaeological sites are found on the banks of the Lucas Creek and the Ōteha valley, because of its importance as a transportation node. Similar portages linked Shoal Bay (Oneoneroa) at St Leonards Bay, and Kukuwaka ("Scratched Waka"), a portage between Ngataringa Bay and Narrow Neck Beach, located underneath the reclaimed land at Waitemata Golf Club, which was underwater during king tides. Browns Bay was often a stopping point on journeys, for Māori travelling between the north and Auckland to the south.

For much of Māori history, the North Shore acted as a buffer zone, between Te Tai Tokerau Māori in the north and Tāmaki Māori tribes in the south.

==== Te Kawerau ā Maki, Ngāi Tai ki Tāmaki and Ngāti Manuhiri ====
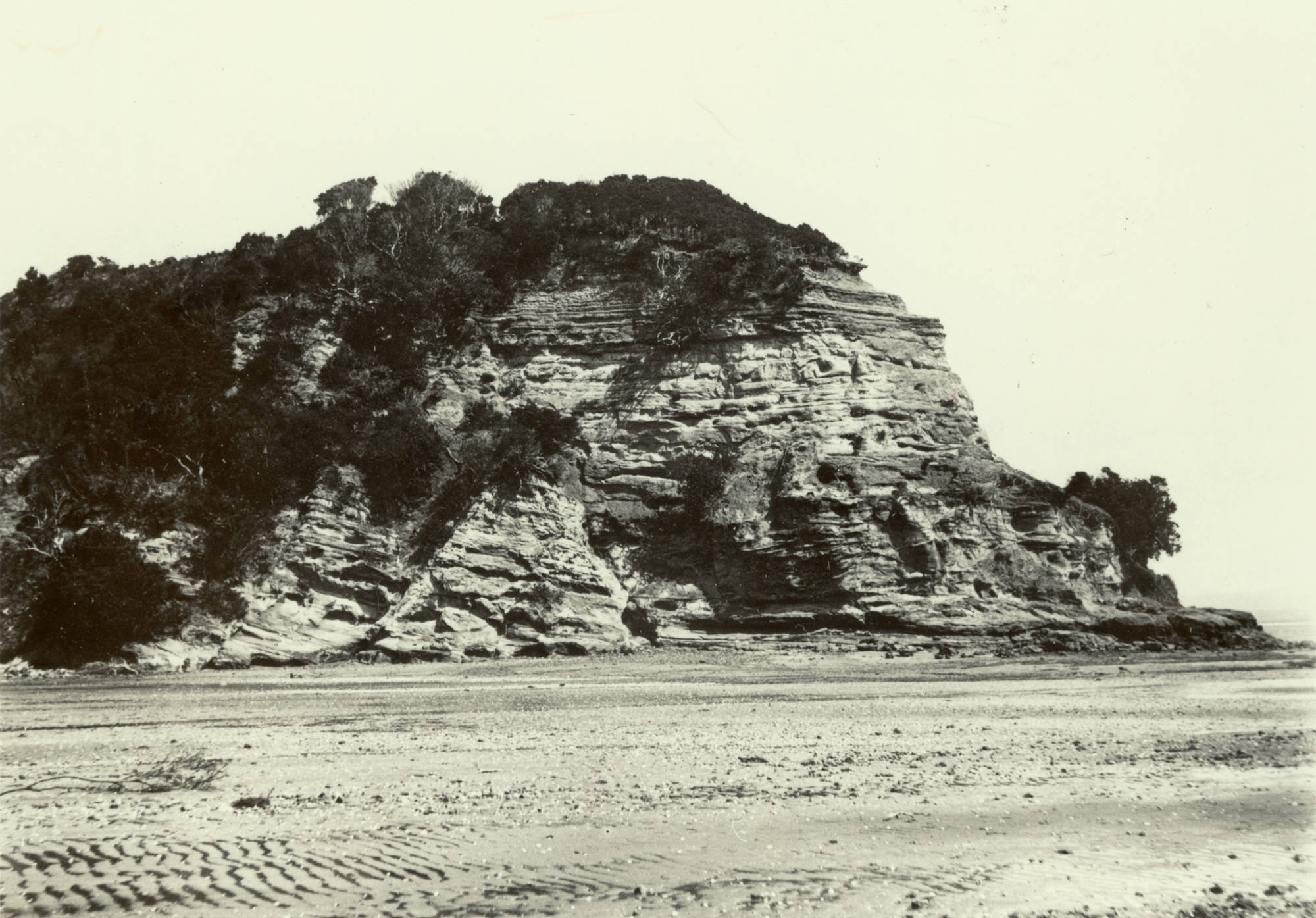
Kauri Point was the location of Te Mātārae ō Mana ("The Brow of Mana"), a Te Kawerau ā Maki pā overlooking the Waitematā Harbour and close to an important shark fishery

Likely in the 17th century, the warrior Maki migrated from the Kāwhia Harbour to his ancestral home in the Auckland Region. Maki conquered and unified many of the Tāmaki Māori tribes as Te Kawerau ā Maki, including those of the North Shore. After Maki's death, his sons settled different areas of his lands, creating new hapū. His younger son Maraeariki settled the North Shore and Hibiscus Coast, who based himself at the head of the Ōrewa River. Maraeariki's daughter Kahu succeeded him, and she is the namesake of the North Shore, Te Whenua Roa o Kahu ("The Greater Lands of Kahu"). Many of the iwi of the North Shore, including Ngāti Manuhiri, Ngāti Maraeariki, Ngāti Kahu, Ngāti Poataniwha, Ngāi Tai ki Tāmaki and Ngāti Whātua, can trace their lineage to Kahu. Ngāi Tai ki Tāmaki settlements during this period included Te Onewa Pā in Northcote, the volcanic hills of Takarunga / Mount Victoria and Maungauika / North Head, and Ōmangaia Pā at Browns Bay.

The focal point of Te Kawerau ā Maki on the North Shore was Te Mātārae ō Mana ("The Brow of Mana"), a headland pā at Kauri Point in modern-day Chatswood likely constructed in the 17th century, and Rongohau ("Wind Shelter"), the kāinga below the cliffs at Kendall Bay. The pā was of strategic importance due to its commanding view of the Waitematā Harbour, and its proximity to a renowned tauranga mango, a shark fishery which brought seasonal visitors from across Tāmaki Makurau and the Hauraki Gulf in the summer, including important rangatira such as Kiwi Tāmaki of Waiohua, and later Tarahawaiki of Ngāti Whātua. Te Mātārae ō Mana was named after the ancestor Manaoterangi, who was the rangatira of the pā in the mid-18th century. The pā was spared from the conflicts of the early 18th century between Ngāti Whātua and Waiohua, as Manaoterangi was a close relative of Tuperiri of the Ngāti Whātua, and was married to Waikahuia, the sister of Kiwi Tāmaki. At the end of his life, Manaoterangi entrusted his people to Tuperiri and the iwi that grew to become Ngāti Whātua Ōrākei.

==== Expansion of Ngāti Pāoa, and early contact with Europeans ====
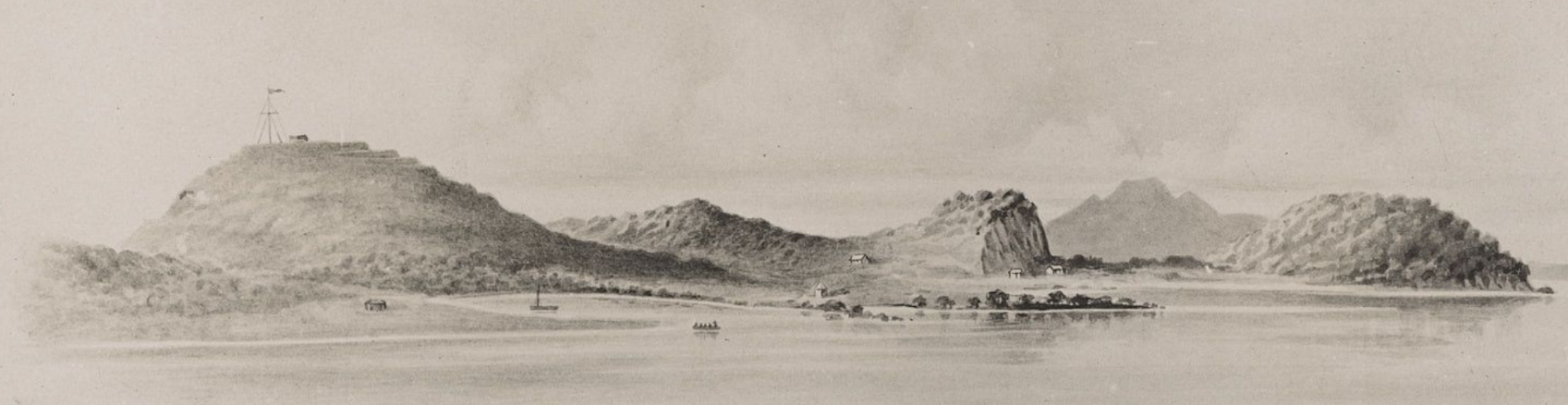
Sketch depicting the North Shore in 1844 (from left): Takarunga / Mount Victoria with visible terracing, Takararo / Mount Cambria, Takamaiiwaho / Duders Hill Rangitoto Island (in distance) and Maungauika / North Head. Maungauika was a fortified Ngāti Paoa pā in the early 1790s.

By the early 18th century, the Marutūāhu iwi Ngāti Paoa had expanded their influence to include the islands of the Hauraki Gulf and the North Shore. The ancestor Kapetaua was marooned at Te Toka-o-Kapetaua (Bean Rock) as a child by his brother-in-law Taramokomoko, Waiohua chief of Kohimarama Pā, as punishment for stealing from kūmara pits. Taramokomoko was rescued by his sister Taurua, and fled to Waiheke Island, where he spent the rest of his childhood training to become a skilled warrior. Around the year 1700, Kapetaua formed a taua and pursued Taramokomoko, leading to the sacking of pā around the North Shore, including Te Rahopara o Peretū (Castor Bay), Onewa (Northcote), and Tauhinu (Greenhithe). After periods of conflict, peace had been reached by the 1790s.

Ngāti Paoa settled in areas such as Te Haukapua (Torpedo Bay), Kiritai (Narrow Neck), and Te Onewa Pā at Northcote. Ngāti Whātua periodically occupied Te Onewa Pā and Maungauika / North Head. The Hauraki Gulf coast of the North Shore was increasingly difficult to permanently settle due to skirmished between from Te Tai Tokerau Māori and Ngāti Manuhiri to the north, and Te Kawerau ā Maki chiefs encouraged Ngāti Paoa to refortify Maungauika / North Head. Ngāpuhi sieged Maungauika / North Head in the winter of 1793, after which the Ngāti Paoa residents at Maungauika / North Head fled to Waiheke Island. The leader of the northern alliance, Te Hōtete (father of Hongi Hika) settled at Takapuna for a period, returning to the north after peace with Ngāti Paoa had been made.

The earliest known European to visit the North Shore was French explorer Jules Dumont d'Urville, who anchored the Astrolabe at Torpedo Bay in 1827. Lottin, the ship's surveyor, climbed Takarunga / Mount Victoria, and noted the pā fortifications, huts and stonefield gardens in the area. d'Urville was the first person to record the name Takapuna for the lower North Shore, when he labelled the area Taka Pouni on an 1833 map.

Early contact with Europeans in the late 18th century caused many Tāmaki Māori to die of rewharewha, respiratory diseases. By the first half of the 19th century, the Upper Waitematā Harbour area near modern-day Greenhithe area was one of the most densely settled areas of the North Shore.

During the early 1820s, most Māori of the North Shore fled for the Waikato or Northland due to the threat of Ngāpuhi war parties during the Musket Wars. Pā and kāinga along the coastline were attacked, including Maungauika / North Head. Ngāti Whātua left an ahi kā presence at Tauhinu pā in Greenhithe: a small number of warriors posted to maintain claim to land.

When people returned in greater numbers to the Auckland Region in the mid-1830s, Ngāti Whātua focused resettlement in the Māngere-Onehunga area, while Te Kawerau ā Maki focused settlement at Te Henga / Bethells Beach and Ngāi Tai ki Tāmaki primarily focused resettlement in East Auckland and the Pōhutukawa Coast. Ngāti Pāoa primarily focused live at Wharekawa and Waiheke Island, and were more confident occupying the North Shore, after peace had been forged between Ngāpuhi and Ngāti Pāoa in 1833. Hetaraka Takapuna and his people resettled the Northcote area in the 1830s, living on the shores of Tank Farm into the 1890s. His people were members of the te Kawerau ā Maki hapū of Ngāti Kahu and Ngāti Poataniwha, who had close associations to Ngāti Taimanawaiti (Ngāi Tai ki Tāmaki) and Ngāti Paoa.

=== Early European settlement ===
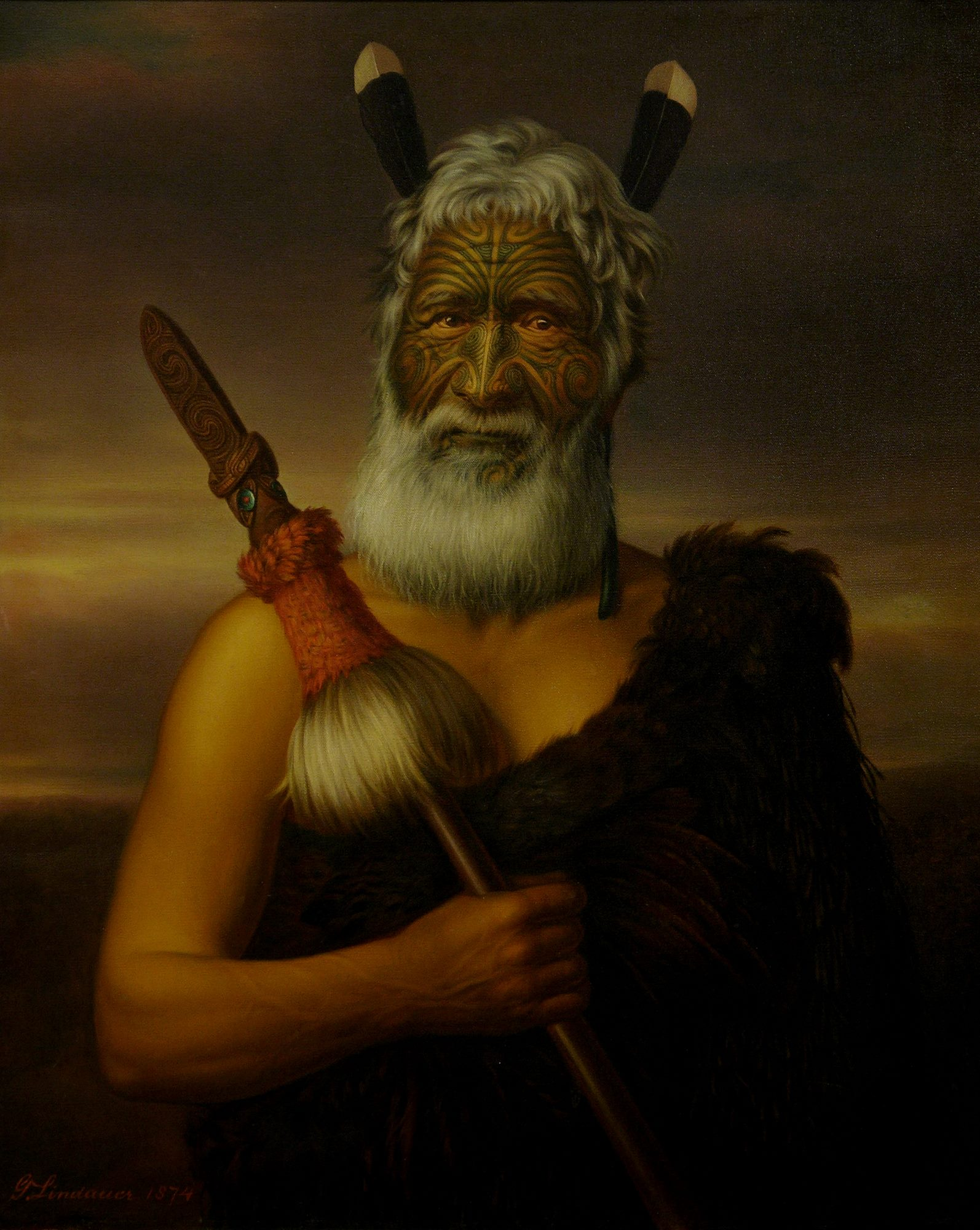
Ngāpuhi chief Eruera Maihi Patuone lived near Maungauika / North Head in the 1840s with his wife Rīria (aka Takarangi) and her Ngāti Paoa relatives. In 1852, the Crown granted 110 acres (45 ha) of land south of Lake Pupuke to Patuone, as a protective buffer for the settlement of Auckland

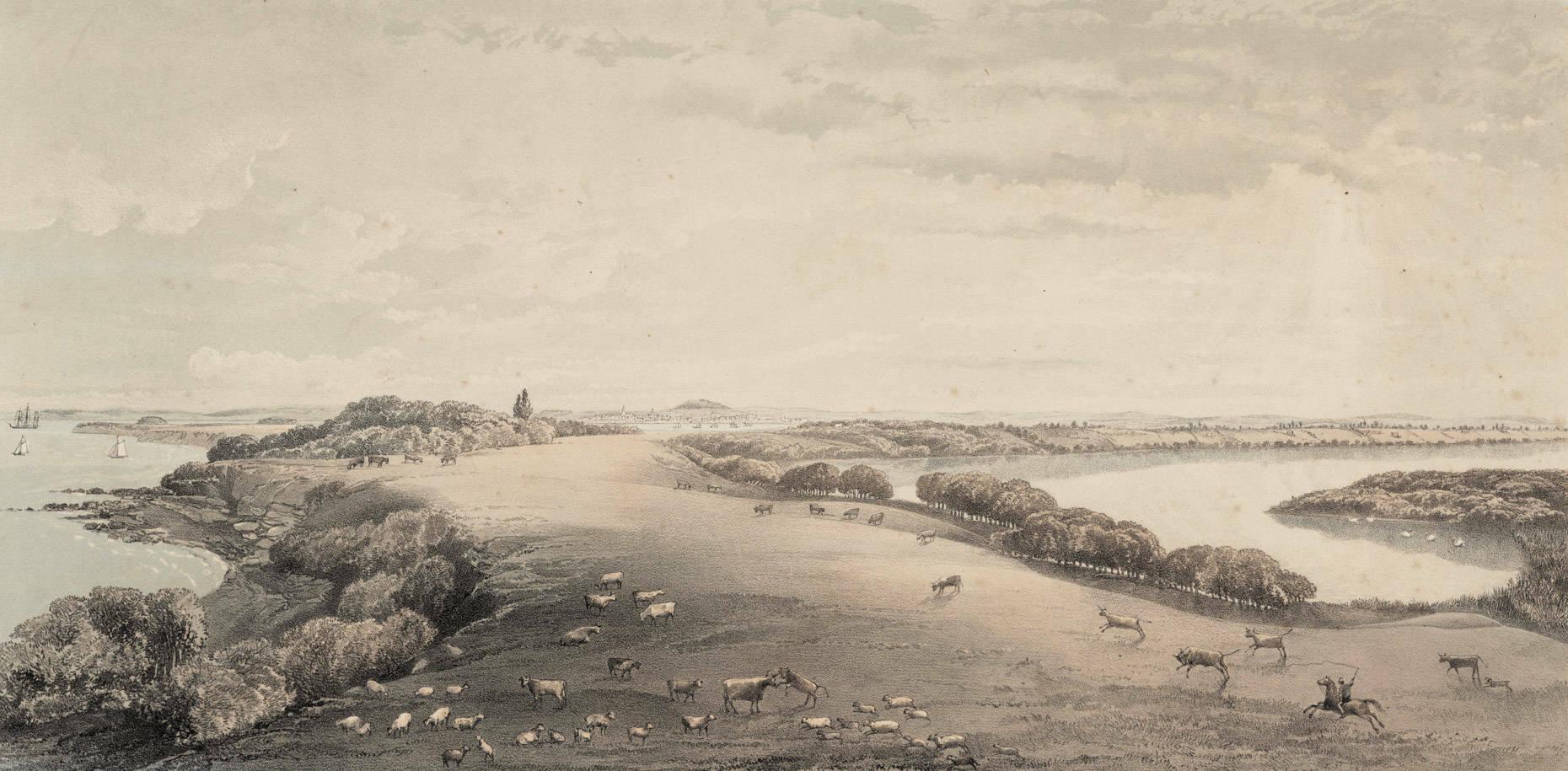
Lithograph of Lake Pupuke and Takapuna Beach looking south in 1862

Most early European settlers of the 1830s were not attracted to the North Shore, due to few Māori inhabitants in the area, and the shore's resources being difficult to extract. The earliest private land sales took place on 17 April 1837, when Ngāti Whātua rangatira Nanihi and Tuire sold Te Pukapuka, a 320 acres (130 ha) block to American whaler William Webster, at the northeastern headwaters of Oruamo or Hellyers Creek, near Bayview. Webster on-sold the land to Thomas Hellyer on 13 October 1840, who established the Retreat, a house which included a kauri sawpit, a hut, and a workshop. The Retreat became well known among sailors, who would stop at the Retreat for fresh water and beer from the Retreat's brewhouse. On 22 December 1841, Hellyer's body was discovered at the Retreat, and while an investigation took place, no person was convicted of his murder.

When Auckland was declared the capital of New Zealand in 1840, settlers and land speculators began to take more interest in the North Shore. The North Shore was included in the Mahurangi Block, an area purchased by the Crown on 13 April 1841. The Crown negotiated this sale with some iwi with customary interests in the area, such as Ngāti Paoa, other Marutūāhu iwi and Ngāi Tai ki Tāmaki, but not others, such as Te Kawerau ā Maki or Ngāti Rango; spending until 1873 rectifying this sale.

In 1840, the first European building was constructed at Devonport, a powder magazine built at what is now Windsor Reserve. Devonport was of immediate importance to the Royal Navy, due to its proximity to Auckland, and because large vessels could be anchored at the deep water harbour. In 1841 a signal station was constructed on the peak, to better facilitate traffic to the Port of Auckland, Captain Robert Snow was employed as the first signal master, and he and his family became the first permanent residents of Devonport. The area was administered by the crown, and grew to be a settlement known as Flagstaff. Snow's family were joined by others from 1842 onwards, who were predominantly naval personnel.

Members of Ngāti Paoa continued to live at Devonport in the 1840s, including Takarangi (baptised as Rīria), sister of Te Kupenga, a chief of Ngāti Paoa. Her husband Eruera Maihi Patuone was a Ngāpuhi chief, who spent time between different trading posts across the Hauraki Gulf, including Waiheke and Devonport. The settlement at Te Haukapua (Torpedo Bay) was known for gardens of potatoes and cabbages, pig farming, and as a place where shark meat was suspended to dry.

In 1847, flames were seen rising from the Snow family residence, and the family had found to be murdered. Many feared that Māori had done this, and that Snow's death was a sign of an imminent invasion. To ease tensions, Eruera Maihi Patuone investigated who could have undertaken the murder. Police suspected Thomas Duder, who had followed Snow as the signalman in 1843. Duder was arrested, and later their neighbour Joseph Burns was found guilty of the murders. Burns became the first European to be executed in New Zealand.

Outside of Devonport, European settlements across the North Shore briefly focused on kauri logging. The supply was exhausted by the early 1840s, after which itinerant kauri gum diggers roamed the North Shore. In the early 1840s, Daniel Clucas established a flax mill at Lucas Creek (Albany), where a small settlement developed, and the Callan family settled at Northcote in 1843, where Phillip Callan established industry at Sulphur Beach, establishing a brickyard and soapworks.

While Auckland grew throughout the 1850s, North Shore settlements remained sparse. Farming, while possible in the volcanic south-east, was much more difficult on the inner North Shore, due to the clay soil. The inner North Shore was covered in a mix of mānuka and bracken fern scrubland, and dense forests, which over time developed into sheep and cattle farms.

In 1852, the Crown granted 110 acres (45 ha) of land south of Lake Pupuke to Barry's Point / Awataha to Eruera Maihi Patuone. Patuone seen as trusted presence by the colonial government, and he was gifted land in order to create a shield for the City of Auckland against the threat of potential invasion from northern and Hauraki tribes. Patuone's people lived in the area until the 1880s. Patuone named his settlement Waiwharariki, meaning "Waters of Wharariki", a mat made of harakeke flax. Patuone's lands at Waiwharariki included a peach tree orchard and a village of twenty huts. Many Ngāpuhi from the settlement worked on the farms at Lake Pupuke, establishing a network of fences for the properties. By the early 1860s, as many Māori lived on the North Shore as Europeans.

=== Invasion of the Waikato ===
The colonial government of Auckland had become increasingly concerned about potential invasions by Māori by the early 1860s. On 9 July 1863, due to fears of the Māori King Movement, Governor Grey proclaimed that all Māori living in the South Auckland area needed to swear loyalty to the Queen and give up their weapons. Most people refused due to strong links to Tainui, leaving for the south, before the Government instigated the Invasion of the Waikato. On the North Shore, a curfew was placed on all Māori vessels, and most Māori residents of the North Shore quickly left, including the kāinga at Te Haukapua (Torpedo Bay), which European residents reported was evacuated overnight.

Māori made up a large proportion of the kauri gum diggers until the invasion. By the 1880s, Dalmatian immigrants had become a large part of the kauri gum digging workforce, along with British, Fijian and Pasifika people.

=== Military forts, Chelsea and strawberries ===
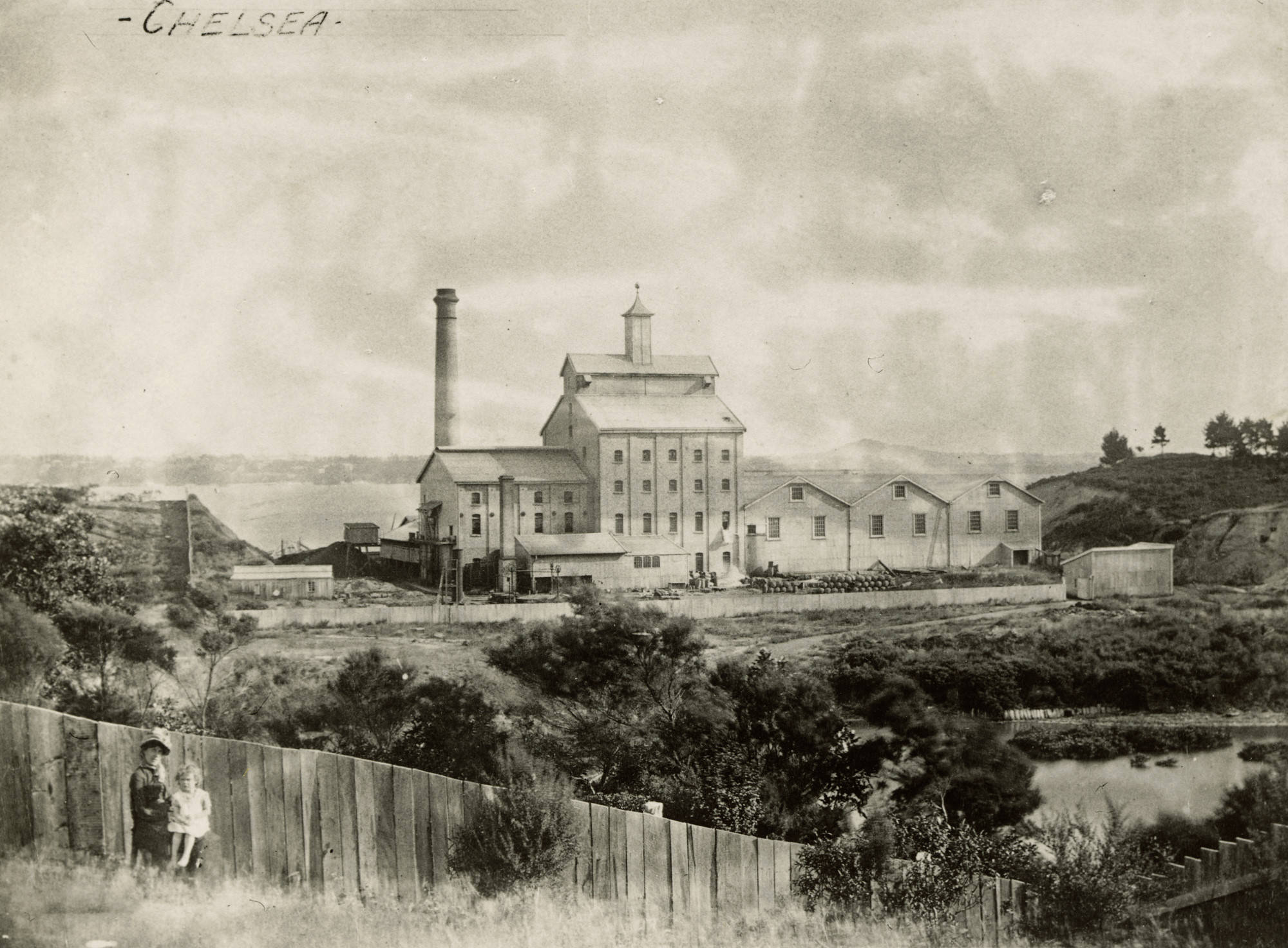
The Chelsea Sugar Refinery (pictured in 1885) helped develop Birkenhead

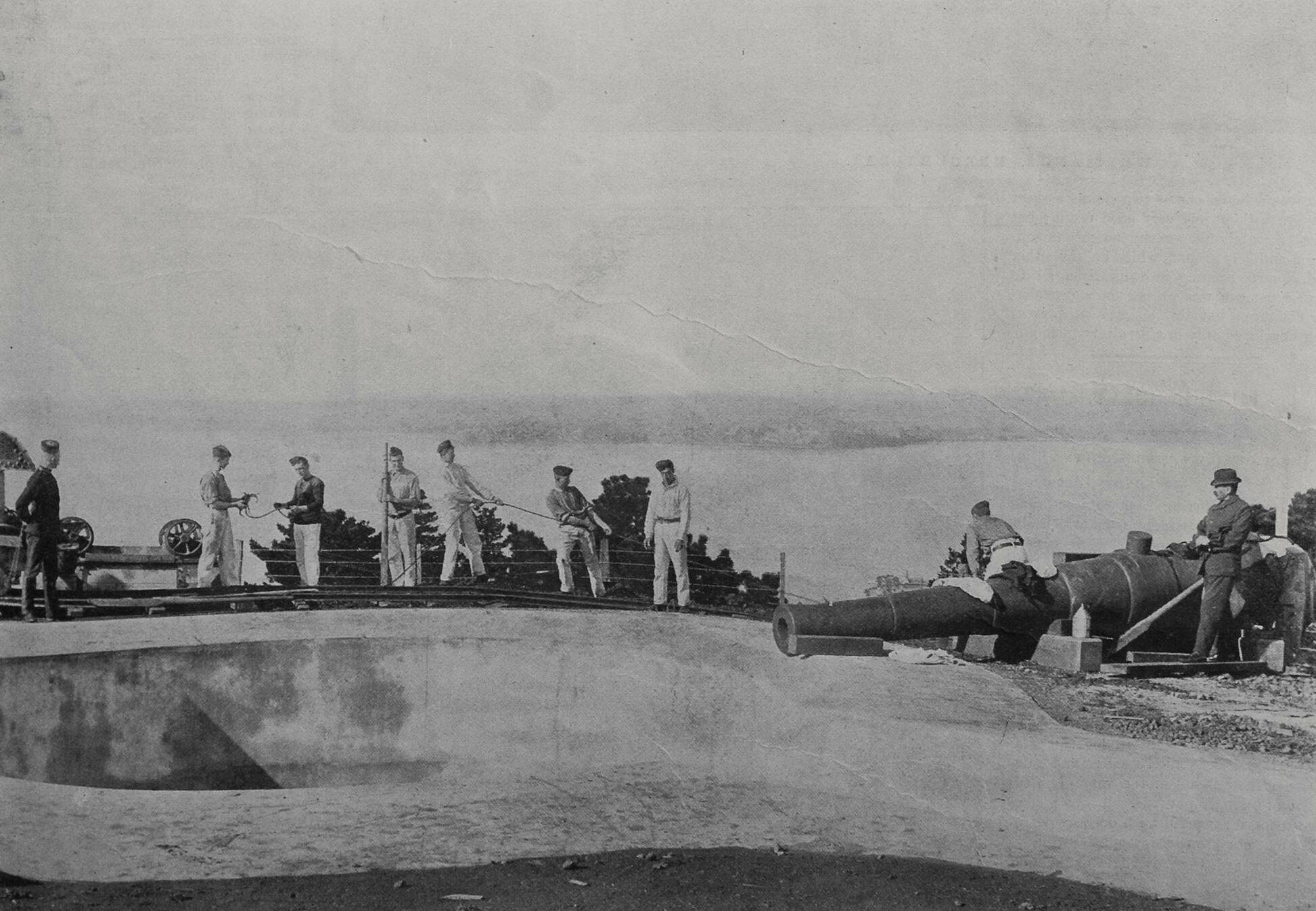
Artillery being installed at Takarunga / Mount Victoria in 1899. The establishment of three military forts in the late 19th century on the North Shore helped grow Devonport

Devonport had grown into a centre for boatbuilding in New Zealand by the mid-1860s, and rural communities were gradually being established at Northcote and Birkenhead due to ferry services linking these communities to Auckland township. By the 1880s, Birkenhead, Northcote, Takapuna and Albany had developed into rural centres, while at the same time Devonport had developed into a commuter suburb for Auckland. By this time, the population of the North Shore had grown to 2,000 people, of whom 65% lived at Devonport. Almost all residents of the North Shore during this period were from the British Isles.

Fruit growing became a major industry for the central North Shore from the 1860s, most notably for growing varieties of strawberries that flourished in clay soils. Birkenhead grew as a community after 1884 when the Colonial Sugar Refining Company established the Chelsea Sugar Refinery. By the 1890s, Albany had become the leading fruit growing area in Auckland. 30,000 to 50,000 cases of apples and pears were being produced each year, with many being exported to Australia.

Fears of invasion by the expanding Russian Empire were common among New Zealanders in the 1870s, especially due to the founding of Russia's Pacific port at Vladivostok. An 1884 report by Sir William Jervois, the Governor of New Zealand, included recommendations for military forts to be constructed at the country's four main ports at Auckland, leading to the establishment of three military forts: North Head, Fort Takapuna, and Fort Victoria at Takarunga / Mount Victoria. The defense works led to growth at Devonport due to the arrival of military personnel, and by 1885 a reliable ferry service had been established between Devonport and Auckland.

=== Tourism and the tramway ===
By the late 1880s, Takapuna had developed into a destination for tourists, with Lake Pupuke being the main attraction until the late 1900s, when Takapuna Beach rose in prominence. Takapuna and Milford quickly became popular spots for wealthy businessmen building summer homes to entertain in a rural surrounding. Eventually, many moved here permanently, commuting to work in Auckland via ferry. The East Coast Bays became popular vacation destinations in the 1910s and 1920s, with visitors primarily arriving by steam ship.

In 1910, a private tramway was established, which conveyed passengers between the ferry at Bayswater to Milford. Planned as a way to improve land prices by a group of local businessmen, the tram led to Milford and Takapuna rapidly developing, and helped communities further north develop. The tramway soon became unpopular, and closed only 17 years after opening.

Fruit growing on the North Shore was no longer as profitable, and began disappearing by the 1930s. During World War II, coastal defenses were established along the coast, between Takapuna and Long Bay.

=== Auckland Harbour Bridge and rapid development ===
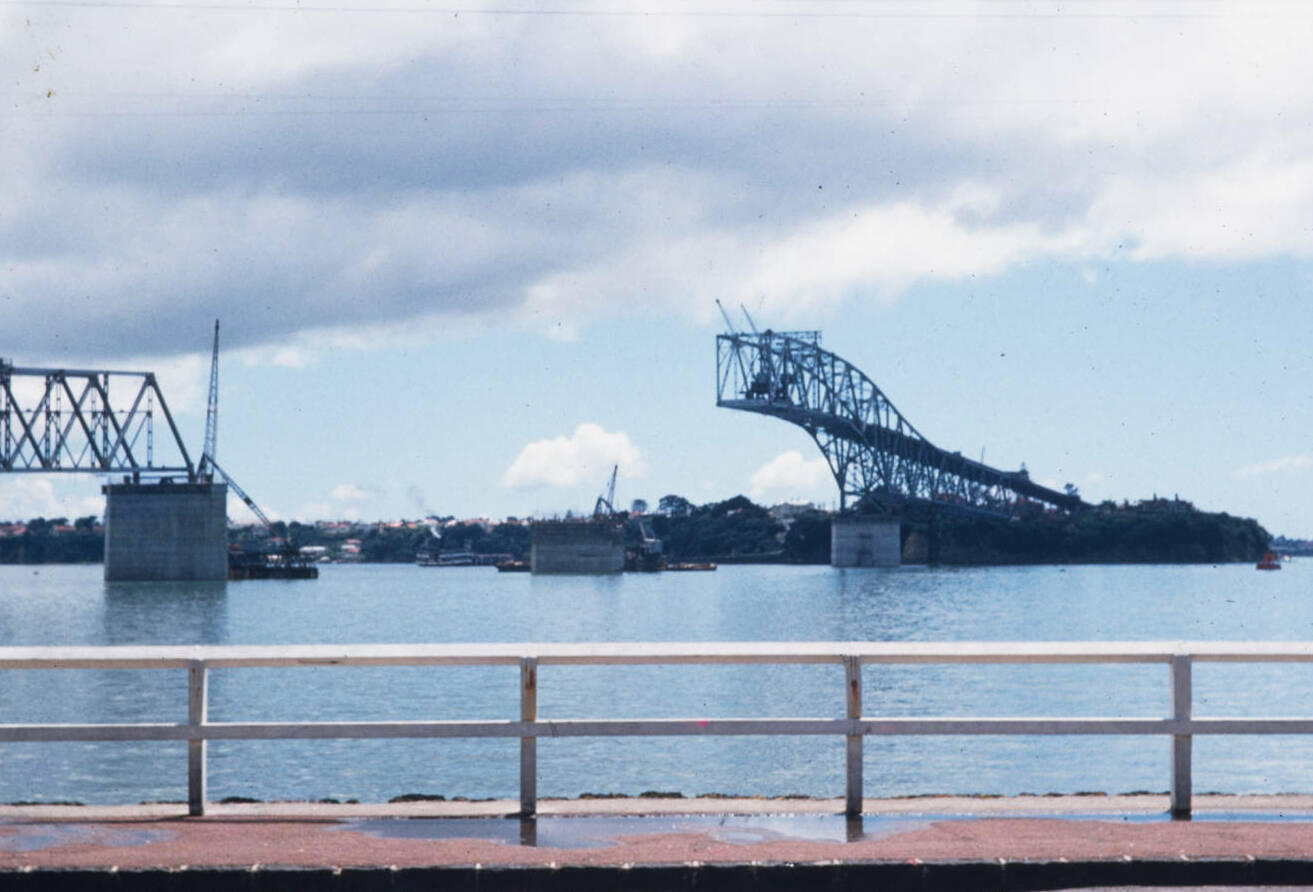
The Auckland Harbour Bridge (pictured during construction) opened in 1959, leading to rapid suburbanisation across the North Shore

In 1959, the Auckland Harbour Bridge was constructed, which led to rapid suburbanisation across the North Shore. The population grew from 55,000 in 1959 to over 107,000 by 1971. While there were few opportunities for employment on the North Shore in the 1950s, this changed with the establishment of industrial areas at Wairau Valley and Barrys Point. The mid to late-20th century saw an influx in Urban Māori populations, alongside immigrants from the Pacific Islands, the Netherlands and Britain, many drawn by industrial jobs and by the seaside atmosphere of the eastern bays, or to the semi-rural lifestyle blocks around Albany.

In 1963, the Second National Government of New Zealand requisitioned 1,500 acres (610 ha) of Albany under the Public Works Act, in order to construct a state housing project. Work was rapidly halted in 1969, and plans for the state housing area were abandoned. In 1977, Centrepoint was established as a commune at Albany. It became one of the most influential communes in New Zealand, at its peak had over 200 residents. In the 1990s, commune leaders including founder Bert Potter were charged on child sexual abuse and drug charges, and the commune was shut down in 2000.

The Upper Harbour Bridge was opened in 1975, connecting the North Shore to West Auckland, and leading to the development of Greenhithe and the surrounding areas. Population growth in the North Shore slowed by the 1980s, and by the early 1990s Takapuna and the East Coast Bays had become popular with retirees.

In 1989, the five local authorities on the North Shore amalgamated, forming the North Shore City. The new city revisited the idea to develop Albany, which quickly became the fastest developing area of the North Shore. The area continued to develop throughout the 2000s, and saw the construction of a vastly expanded Albany Shopping Centre. During the same time period, Long Bay developed suburban housing, due to changes in zoning laws.

In 2007, the Upper Harbour Motorway was opened, creating a motorway connection between West Auckland and the North Shore. In 2008, the Northern Busway was opened along the Northern Motorway.

On 1 November 2010 the North Shore boundaries were amalgamated with the rest of the entire Auckland Region, and the North Shore City Council was abolished and replaced by a single unitary city authority. All council services and facilities are now under authority of the Auckland Council.

== Demographics ==
North Shore covers 116.64 km^{2} (45.03 sq mi) (Note: In this section, North Shore is treated as including North Shore ward and parts of Albany ward as listed in the table of individual statistical areas.) and had an estimated population of 261,137 as of June 2025, with a population density of 2,239 people per km^{2}.

Historical population
Year	Pop.	±% p.a.
2006	203,400	—
2013	221,682	+1.24%
2018	238,629	+1.48%
2023	244,515	+0.49%
The 2006 population is for a smaller area of 114.27 km^{2}. Source:

North Shore had a population of 244,515 in the 2023 New Zealand census, an increase of 5,886 people (2.5%) since the 2018 census, and an increase of 22,833 people (10.3%) since the 2013 census. There were 119,898 males, 123,783 females and 834 people of other genders in 83,751 dwellings. 3.5% of people identified as LGBTIQ+. There were 43,992 people (18.0%) aged under 15 years, 47,622 (19.5%) aged 15 to 29, 116,955 (47.8%) aged 30 to 64, and 35,943 (14.7%) aged 65 or older.

People could identify as more than one ethnicity. The results were 58.6% European (Pākehā); 6.9% Māori; 3.9% Pasifika; 35.4% Asian; 3.4% Middle Eastern, Latin American and African New Zealanders (MELAA); and 2.1% other, which includes people giving their ethnicity as "New Zealander". English was spoken by 92.1%, Māori language by 1.3%, Samoan by 0.6%, and other languages by 34.2%. No language could be spoken by 2.1% (e.g. too young to talk). New Zealand Sign Language was known by 0.3%. The percentage of people born overseas was 49.0, compared with 28.8% nationally.

Religious affiliations were 31.4% Christian, 2.3% Hindu, 1.6% Islam, 0.3% Māori religious beliefs, 1.8% Buddhist, 0.3% New Age, 0.2% Jewish, and 1.3% other religions. People who answered that they had no religion were 55.1%, and 5.8% of people did not answer the census question.

Of those at least 15 years old, 78,150 (39.0%) people had a bachelor's or higher degree, 80,061 (39.9%) had a post-high school certificate or diploma, and 42,291 (21.1%) people exclusively held high school qualifications. 35,949 people (17.9%) earned over $100,000 compared to 12.1% nationally. The employment status of those at least 15 was that 108,087 (53.9%) people were employed full-time, 26,895 (13.4%) were part-time, and 4,965 (2.5%) were unemployed.

Individual statistical areas
Name	Area (km^{2})	Population	Density (per km^{2})	Dwellings	Median age	Median income
Albany	10.67	11,964	1,121	4,218	36.5 years	$42,400
Schnapper Rock	2.21	3,867	1,750	1,131	36.6 years	$49,400
Greenhithe	7.81	8,907	1,140	2,718	38.6 years	$53,500
Long Bay	2.85	3,141	1,102	933	36.6 years	$49,800
Torbay-Waiake	5.17	15,984	3,092	5,439	39.5 years	$50,400
Fairview Heights	1.61	4,152	2,579	1,182	35.7 years	$37,800
Northcross	1.07	3,258	3,045	1,101	38.4 years	$48,500
Oteha	1.29	5,379	4,170	1,749	35.9 years	$43,000
Browns Bay	3.19	10,311	3,232	3,573	39.8 years	$45,300
Rothesay Bay	0.86	2,892	3,363	993	41.2 years	$50,700
Pinehill	1.63	4,821	2,958	1,284	36.4 years	$39,200
Murrays Bay	1.66	4,872	2,935	1,602	40.9 years	$49,000
North Harbour/Rosedale	5.49	738	134	315	44.6 years	$31,600
Windsor Park	0.84	1,713	2,039	726	43.5 years	$34,200
Mairangi Bay	1.73	5,832	3,371	1,899	40.9 years	$46,800
Campbells Bay	1.74	2,847	1,636	966	42.1 years	$54,200
Sunnynook	1.55	5,532	3,569	1,794	35.0 years	$46,300
Unsworth Heights	1.93	6,348	3,289	2,199	39.6 years	$41,400
Forrest Hill	2.90	10,053	3,467	3,162	36.8 years	$44,100
Castor Bay	1.44	4,548	3,158	1,629	43.1 years	$55,500
Tōtara Vale	1.69	6,438	3,809	2,136	34.7 years	$46,400
Glenfield	7.28	16,851	2,315	5,457	35.9 years	$46,900
Beach Haven	3.67	10,845	2,955	3,738	35.4 years	$51,100
Bayview	3.04	9,030	2,970	2,910	34.7 years	$51,100
Milford	2.23	7,794	3,495	3,045	43.4 years	$50,300
Takapuna	3.86	8,484	2,198	3,702	45.3 years	$51,400
Birkdale	2.90	9,204	3,174	3,105	34.6 years	$51,800
Hillcrest	2.93	10,635	3,630	3,546	36.3 years	$50,100
Northcote	4.10	8,478	2,068	3,027	35.0 years	$46,900
Birkenhead	4.52	10,341	2,288	3,852	39.7 years	$53,400
Hauraki	1.09	4,371	4,010	1,509	37.6 years	$54,500
Belmont	1.15	3,012	2,619	1,104	38.0 years	$50,100
Narrow Neck	1.82	4,416	2,426	1,656	44.6 years	$49,800
Bayswater	1.10	2,742	2,493	1,059	39.7 years	$53,500
Chatswood	3.07	3,438	1,120	1,116	40.7 years	$51,200
Northcote Point	1.18	3,066	2,598	1,086	39.9 years	$60,600
Devonport	1.89	5,079	2,687	2,097	49.3 years	$55,300
Stanley Point	0.99	1,977	1,977	624	39.1 years	$58,700
Ōkura (Note: The rural settlement of Ōkura is the most densely populated part of Okura Bush.)	0.36	381	1,058	132	42.1 years	$53,700
7001835 (Note: The statistical area of Okura Bush is partly rural, and only the urban parts are included. These smaller areas do not have names in the census results, only numbers.)	1.04	135	130	39	42.9 years	$50,500
7001836	1.13	120	106	42	41.4 years	$53,200
7001837	0.71	87	123	24	38.2 years	$44,600
7001928	5.13	213	42	69	39.3 years	$56,100
7030577	2.12	219	103	63	41.0 years	$44,500
New Zealand					38.1 years	$41,500

== Transportation ==
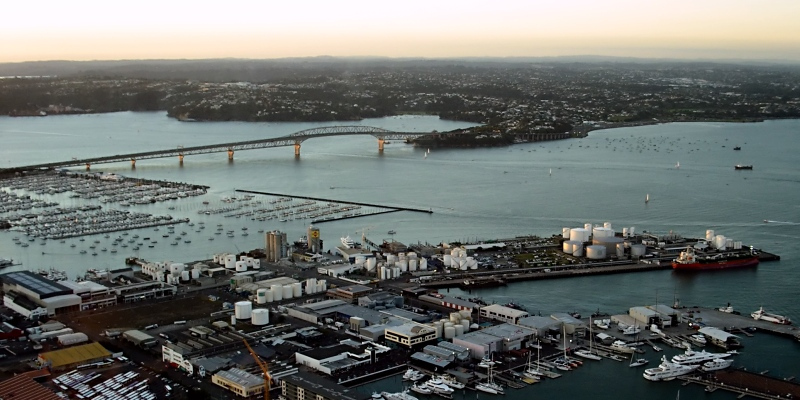
View over the Waitematā Harbour towards Birkenhead, connected by the Auckland Harbour Bridge

Commuting within the North Shore itself can be done relatively easily, but those who commute to the Auckland CBD and need to cross the Auckland Harbour Bridge face severe traffic congestion. The alternative route through western suburbs is also prone to nose-to-tail traffic at peak times. As with the greater Auckland area, there has been much discussion regarding the problem at both national and local government levels, but very little concrete action, mostly related to the high cost and difficulty of providing additional crossings over the Waitematā Harbour. Several options for new bridges and tunnels have been studied in depth, but at the moment, the official position is to mitigate congestion effects instead of providing new infrastructure. In May 2021, the government announced a $685 million cycling/walking bridge that would cross the Waitematā Harbour, after a bike protest shut down two lanes of the Auckland Harbour Bridge. However, just four months later in October, the government decided to scrap the project.

The Northern Busway running alongside the Northern Motorway, together with park and ride or drop-off areas at most of its stations, serves as the spine of a bus-based rapid transit system for North Shore and Hibiscus Coast citizens. The busway was fully operational between Constellation and Akoranga in February 2008.

A number of North Shore suburbs have a regular ferry service operated by Fullers360 to the Auckland CBD, including Devonport, Stanley Bay, Bayswater, Birkenhead. Others are planned for Takapuna and Browns Bay. A plan in the mid-2000s to turn North Shore streets into a venue for a three-day V8 supercar race generated controversy; traffic experts were hired by the North Shore City Council to assess whether such a race was possible "without causing mayhem on the roads."

== Politics ==
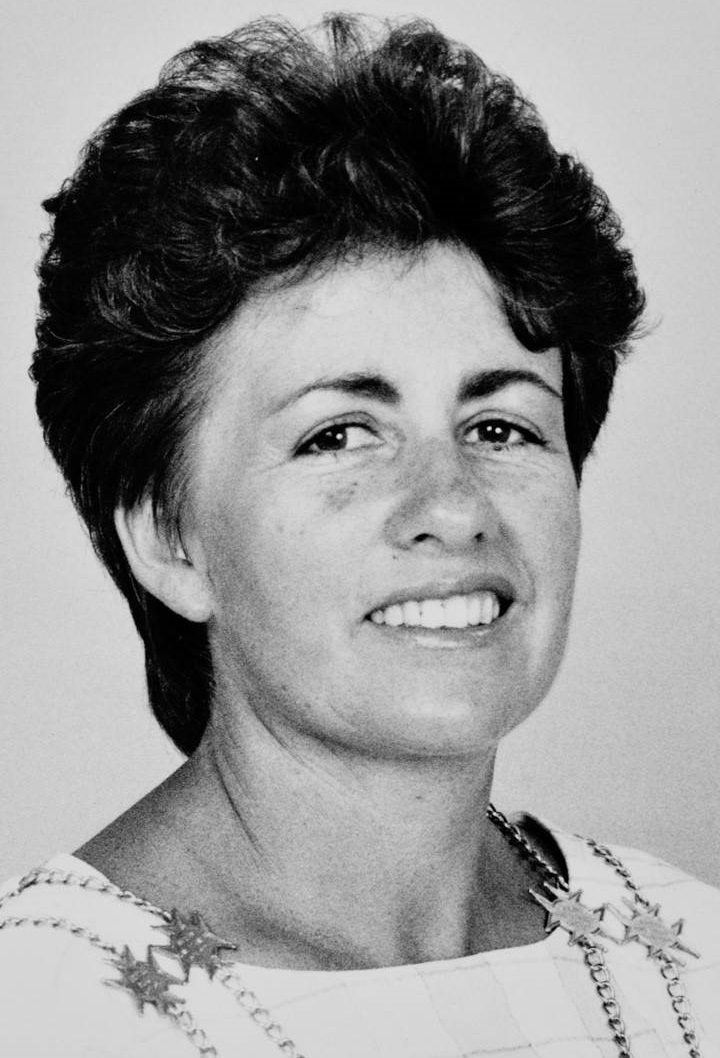
Ann Hartley was elected the first mayor of North Shore City in 1989

The North Shore was first administered by highway districts, which operated from the 1860s onwards, pooling local residents' resources in order to improve infrastructure. In 1876, the Waitemata County was established across the North Shore and West Auckland after the abolition of the Auckland Province, and was one of the largest counties created in New Zealand. Between 1886 and 1954, areas of the North Shore voted to become independent areas separate from the council, establishing boroughs. The first of these was Devonport in 1886, soon followed by Birkenhead in 1888. Northcote was declared a borough in 1908, and Takapuna in 1913. The final borough that split from the Waitemata County was East Coast Bays in 1954. From 1898 until 1967, Rangitoto Island was administered by the Devonport Borough.

With the construction of the Auckland Harbour Bridge in 1959, the North Shore was opened up for expansion - vehicle volumes on the bridge became three times the forecast volume within the first decade, and began turning parts of it into a dormitory town for people working in the Auckland City Centre or further south. In 1961, Glenfield became a county town within the Waitemata County, led by chairman Stan Compton until his death in 1965, and later by Arthur Gibbons.

In the early 1960s, the Auckland Regional Planning Authority began looking for ways to better develop the county. When the dissolution of the county began to be discussed, a new body was proposed for the western North Shore, formed from the growing centres of Albany and Glenfield, which the ARA predicted would have a greater population than Takapuna City by 1986. The new body was voted on and the measure rejected, meaning that Albany and Glenfield would be incorporated into the City of Takapuna instead. On 1 August 1974, the Waitemata County was dissolved, leading to Glenfield, Albany and Long Bay, to be incorporated into Takapuna City.

In 1989, Devonport, Birkenhead, Northcote, Takapuna and East Coast Bays amalgamated, to form North Shore City. The city was run by a 15-member council (North Shore City Council) and mayor, democratically elected every three years using the First Past the Post voting system. North Shore City was amalgamated into Auckland Council in November 2010. The final mayor prior to 2010 amalgamation was Andrew Williams, who was a strong critic of the 'Super City' proposals which would see North Shore City amalgamated into a larger Auckland authority, Auckland Council.

Since the 2010 local government reforms, the North Shore has been split between four local boards. Two local boards are found entirely within the North Shore: the Kaipātiki Local Board to the southwest, and the Devonport-Takapuna Local Board to the southeast. The combined areas of these two districts form the North Shore ward, which elects two councillors to the Auckland Council. Additionally, part of the North Shore falls under the Upper Harbour Local Board. The East Coast Bays falls under the Hibiscus and Bays Local Board. Similar to the North Shore ward, the Upper Harbour and Hibiscus and Bays areas combine to form the Albany ward, which elects two councillors to the Auckland Council.

For national elections, there are currently three electorates found entirely within the North Shore: North Shore, Northcote and East Coast Bays. Half of the area of the Upper Harbour electorate can be found on the North Shore, and the North Shore is entirely contained within the Māori electorate of Te Tai Tokerau.

== Economy ==
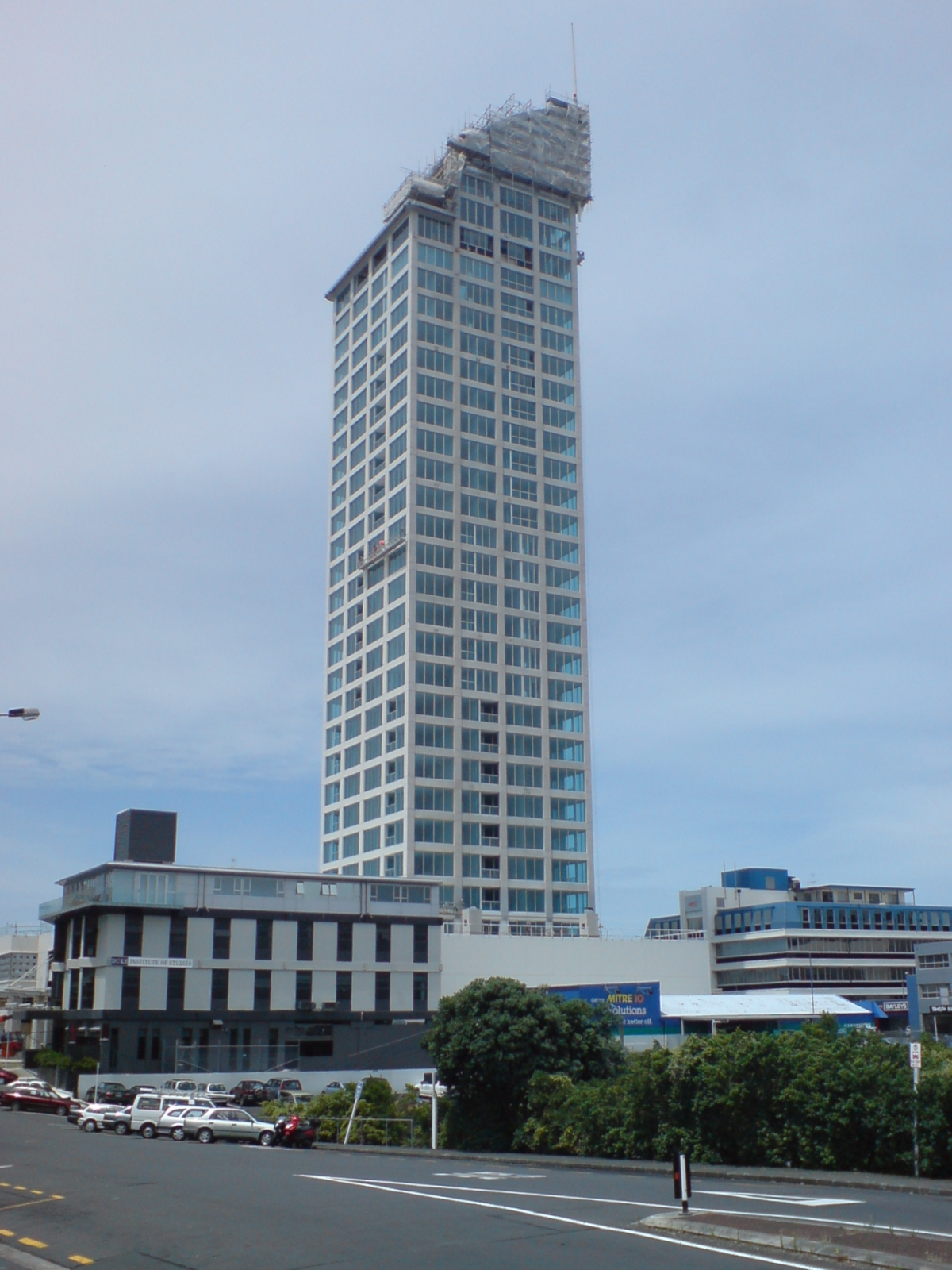
The Sentinel is a luxury residential skyscraper in Takapuna

There are over 22,000 businesses located on the North Shore, contributing to over 6% of New Zealand's GDP. The city topped the nation's growth rates for numbers of businesses between 1998 and 2002, growing 29.3%.

The suburb Albany has become the commercial centre of the North Shore. A number of retailers like Westfield are building or have built "super stores" in the area, anticipating ongoing commercial growth and expansion. The area has also experienced the construction of intense cheaper housing, and thousands of acres of farmland has been turned into mini-suburbs comprising hundreds of houses all of a similar design. As such, the Albany area has attracted hundreds of millions of investment dollars.

The Royal New Zealand Navy has its main base in Devonport and is a significant employer and industry.

Residential development on the North Shore continues to rapidly sprawl northwards. The Rodney township of Orewa and the Whangaparāoa Peninsula, 25 kilometres north of Takapuna, were once holiday resorts. They are now linked by the Northern Motorway and may eventually be contiguous with the North Shore's northward urban expansion.

Some parts of the North Shore boast some of the most expensive real estate in New Zealand. The stretch of coast that runs north from Takapuna Beach to Milford, often referred to as the "Golden Mile", has many properties there that have sold for several million dollars (NZ$) particularly because of the beaches, Lake Pupuke, popular schools and shopping centres such as Shore City. In 2005, one beachfront property sold for $12.8 million. Rents and property prices on the North Shore are high in relative terms, with average weekly rents (in 2002) of $243 versus $237 for Wellington and $236 for Auckland.

== Television ==
The North Shore is the onscreen home of New Zealand's most successful soap opera: Shortland Street (It was previously primarily filmed there but still has scenes on the North Shore). Go Girls is another popular show set on the North Shore. Prime TV channel has its studios and based in Albany.

== Sports ==
The North Shore is home to the North Harbour Rugby Union, who field a team in the Mitre 10 Cup. They are based at North Harbour Stadium in Albany. North Shore Rugby Football Club, who play in Devonport, are the oldest rugby union club in the Auckland Region and one of the oldest in New Zealand. The North Shore is also home to North Shore United, founded in 1886, the oldest surviving association football club in New Zealand.

== Notable people ==
- Judy Bailey – retired television newsreader
- Dean Barker – yachtsman
- Robert Berridge – professional boxer
- Stephen Berry – politician and political commentator
- Sir Peter Blake – yachtsman
- Tessa Duder - author and former swimmer
- Nick Evans – rugby player
- Ian Ferguson – canoeist, Olympic gold medalist
- John Hood – former vice-chancellor of the University of Oxford and University of Auckland
- Rachel Hunter – model and actress
- Ian Jones – rugby union player
- Lorde – singer/songwriter
- Sean Marks – basketball player
- Luke McAlister – rugby union player
- Peter Montgomery – sports broadcaster
- Danny Morrison – cricketer
- Kirk Penney – basketball player
- Winston Reid – footballer
- Frank Sargeson – writer
- Wayne "Buck" Shelford – rugby player
- Pamela Stephenson, Lady Connolly – psychologist, writer, actress, comedian, wife of Billy Connolly
- Bert Sutcliffe – cricketer
- Rosita Vai – New Zealand Idol winner
- Richard Fairgray – author and illustrator

== Panorama ==
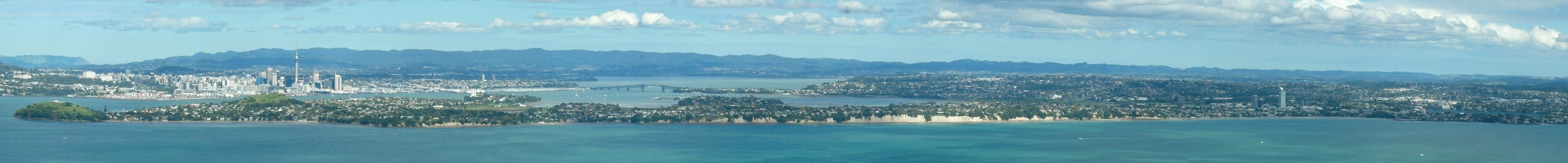
Panorama of the North Shore, seen from Rangitoto.

== Bibliography ==
- Bartlett, Jean (2001). Takapuna: People and Places (2nd ed.). Auckland: North Shore City Council. ISBN 978-0-473-07877-5. OCLC 973591276. Wikidata Q123755661.
- Cameron, Ewen; Hayward, Bruce; Murdoch, Graeme (2008). A Field Guide to Auckland: Exploring the Region's Natural and Historical Heritage (rev. ed.). Random House New Zealand. ISBN 978-1-86962-1513.
- Cass, David (1989). ECB – the Years to 1989. East Coast Bays City Council.
- Christmas, Judith (1983), A History of Northcote, Northcote Borough Council, OCLC 154573998, Wikidata Q123591383
- Dunmore, John (2001). Greenhithe: Today & Yesterday. Auckland: Heritage Press Ltd. ISBN 0-908708-53-X. OCLC 80291058. Wikidata Q123416573.
- Gray, Marie; Sturm, Jennifer, eds. (June 2008). ...And Then Came the Bridge. A History of Long Bay and Torbay. Torbay Historical Society. ISBN 978-0-473-13957-5.
- Harris, Alison; Stevenson, Robert (2002). Once There Were Green Fields: the Story of Albany, New Zealand. Albany. ISBN 0-473-08160-1. OCLC 62526122. Wikidata Q123424599.
- King, Ray (1984), Tauhinu: a History of Greenhithe, OCLC 37242212, Wikidata Q123416976
- McClure, Margaret (1987). The Story of Birkenhead. Birkenhead City Council. ISBN 0-908704-04-6. OL 33998949W. Wikidata Q120679112.
- Rounthwaite, Valerie (1989), The Story of Rural Glenfield, Takapuna: Takapuna City Council, OCLC 37482407, Wikidata Q123499466
- Taua, Te Warena (2009). "He Kohikohinga Kōrero mō Hikurangi". In Macdonald, Finlay; Kerr, Ruth (eds.). West: The History of Waitakere. Random House. pp. 23–48. ISBN 9781869790080.
- Verran, David (2010), The North Shore: An Illustrated History, North Shore: Random House, OL 33434370W, Wikidata Q120520385
- Willis, Jenny (2018). Early History of East Coast Bays (Second ed.).
