= Mount Victoria (Auckland) =

Scoria cone in Auckland, New Zealand

Mountain Victoria
- Takarunga
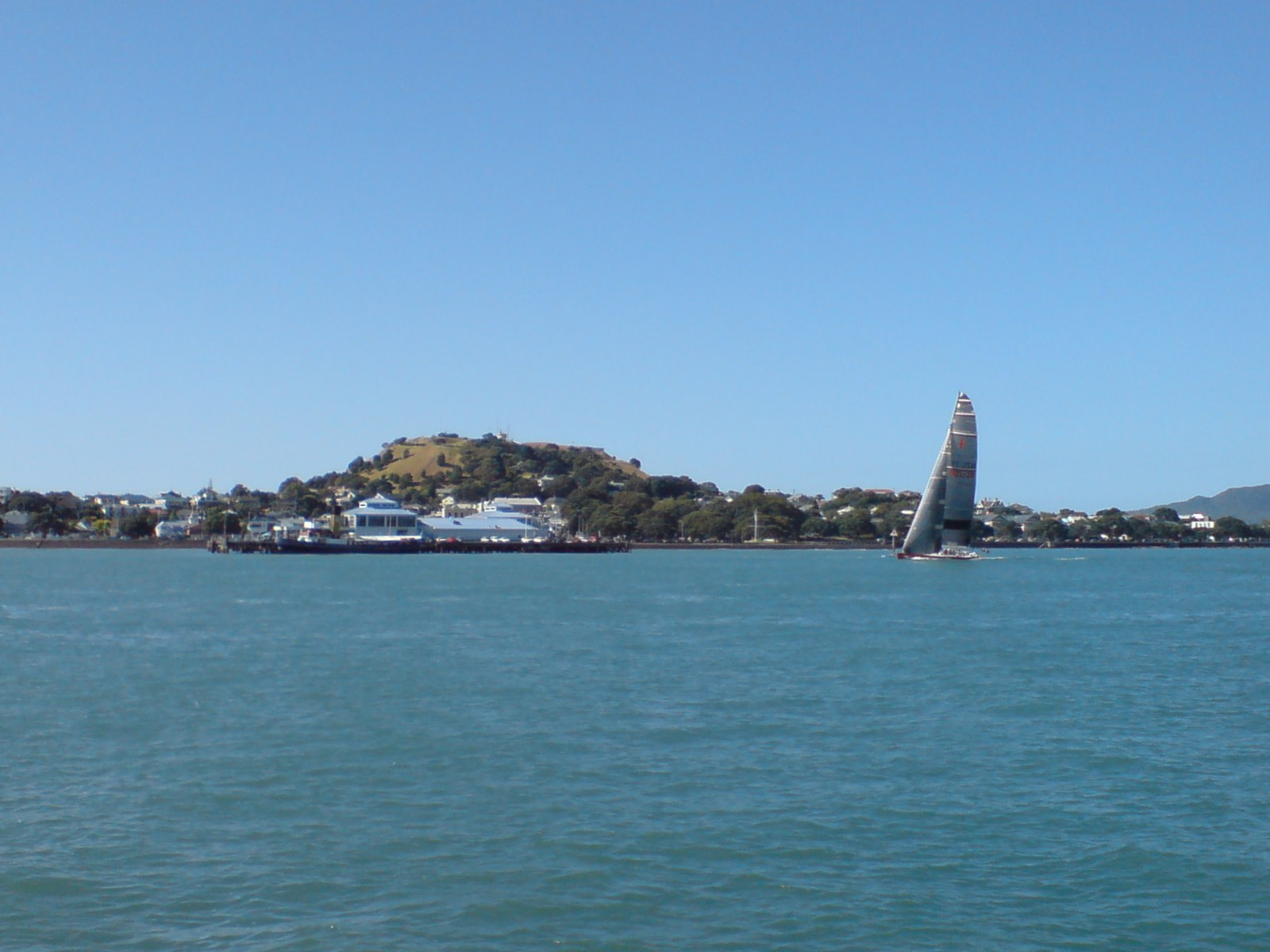
- Takarunga / Mount Victoria as seen from the south on the Waitematā Harbour, the Devonport ferry terminal in the middle distance.

Highest point
- Elevation: 66 m (217 ft)
- Coordinates: 36.8266°S 174.7990°E

Geography
- Location: North Island, New Zealand

Geology
- Volcanic field: Auckland volcanic field

Mount Victoria, officially Takarunga / Mount Victoria, is the highest volcano on Auckland's North Shore, rising to 66 metres in elevation. Its age is currently unknown. Its lava flows now line much of Devonport's waterfront. Mount Victoria was the location of an important pā used by Tāmaki Māori peoples. In the late 19th century, a gun fort was built on top of the hill, in order to defend the city of Auckland. As a designated tūpuna maunga, the mountain has been governed by the Tūpuna Maunga Authority, along with thirteen other cones throughout Auckland, since 2014.

== Geography ==
The hill provides panoramic views of Auckland's Waitematā Harbour and the inner Hauraki Gulf. Over the years the peak and upper slopes have housed a signal station for shipping, artillery emplacements, farmland, and various concrete army bunkers, some from as early as the 1870s. One bunker now serves as the venue for the Devonport Folk Music Club.

The slopes of Mount Victoria are also home to Devonport Primary School, Takarunga Playcentre, a tennis court, a cemetery, a water reservoir which maintains supply to the area, and a scenic lookout. The old Signalman's House is now home to the Michael King Writers Centre which provides writers-in-residence programmes, hosting for visiting writers, residential workshops for experienced writers, and a series of workshops for young poets and emerging writers. The writer-in-residence programmes are supported by Creative New Zealand and the University of Auckland.

== History ==
An important pā once occupied its slopes; some of its earthworks can still be seen. In the 18th century, Mount Victoria was seasonally occupied by Waiohua paramount chief Kiwi Tāmaki, during the seasons for bird catching and preservation. The Māori language name, Takarunga, literally means "The Hill Standing Above", and contrasts with Mount Cambria, a now-quarried hill known to Māori as Takararo (tl. "The Hill Standing Below"). A scoria mound known as Duders Hill, on Mount Victoria's southern slopes was mostly quarried away. French navigator Jules Dumont d'Urville climbed the hill in 1827, and it was given the name Mount Victoria, referring to Queen Victoria, by early settlers.

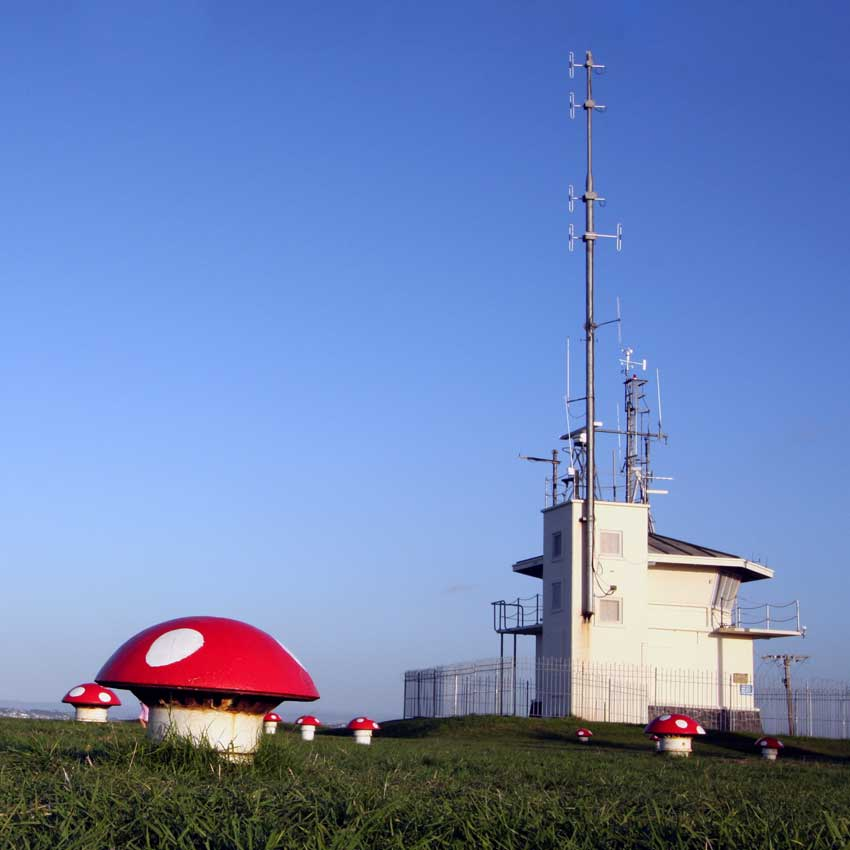
Signal Station on Mount Victoria

In 1841 a signal station was constructed on the peak, to better facilitate traffic to the Port of Auckland, and in 1880 the hill became a public reserve. In 1885, a gun fort was constructed on the peak, which was in use until after World War II.

=== Treaty settlement ===
In the 2014 Treaty of Waitangi settlement between the Crown and the Ngā Mana Whenua o Tāmaki Makaurau collective of 13 Auckland iwi and hapū (also known as the Tāmaki Collective), ownership of the 14 Tūpuna Maunga of Tāmaki Makaurau / Auckland, was vested to the collective, including the volcano officially named Takarunga / Mount Victoria. The legislation specified that the land be held in trust "for the common benefit of Ngā Mana Whenua o Tāmaki Makaurau and the other people of Auckland". The Tūpuna Maunga o Tāmaki Makaurau Authority or Tūpuna Maunga Authority (TMA) is the co-governance organisation established to administer the 14 Tūpuna Maunga. Auckland Council manages the Tūpuna Maunga under the direction of the TMA.

== Gallery ==
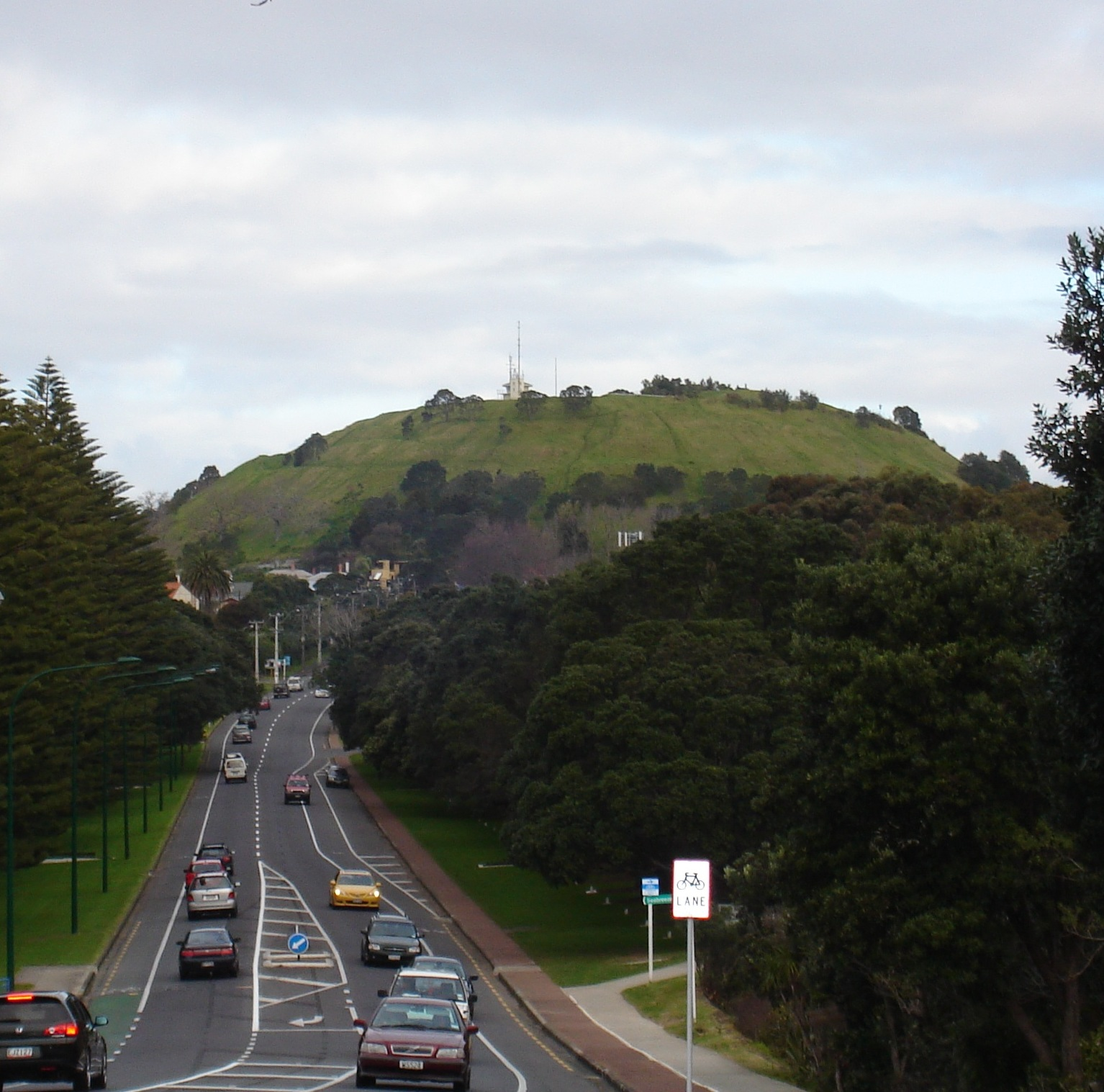
The north side of Mount Victoria, seen from Lake Road

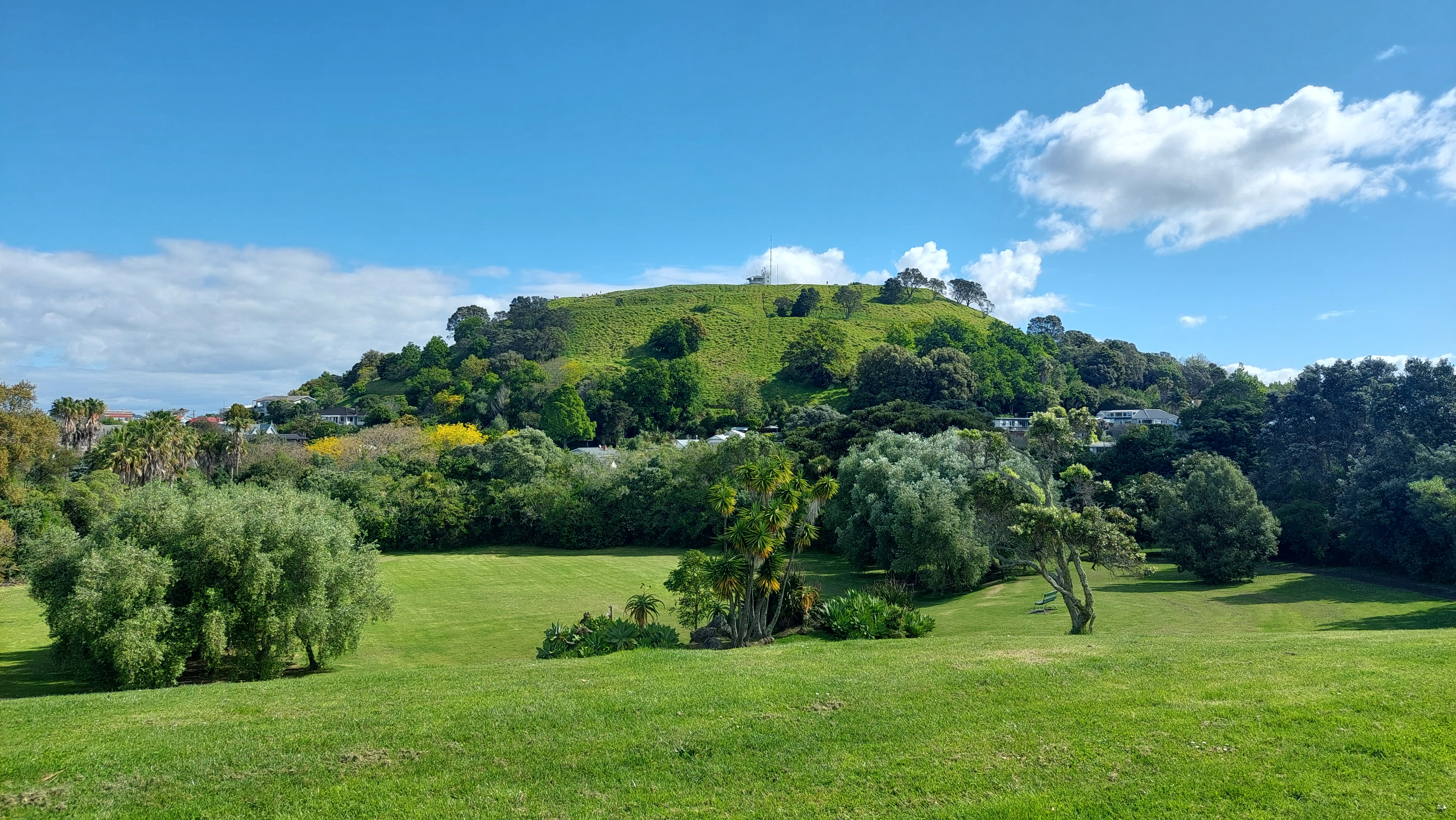
Mount Victoria seen from Mt Cumbria Reserve to the northeast

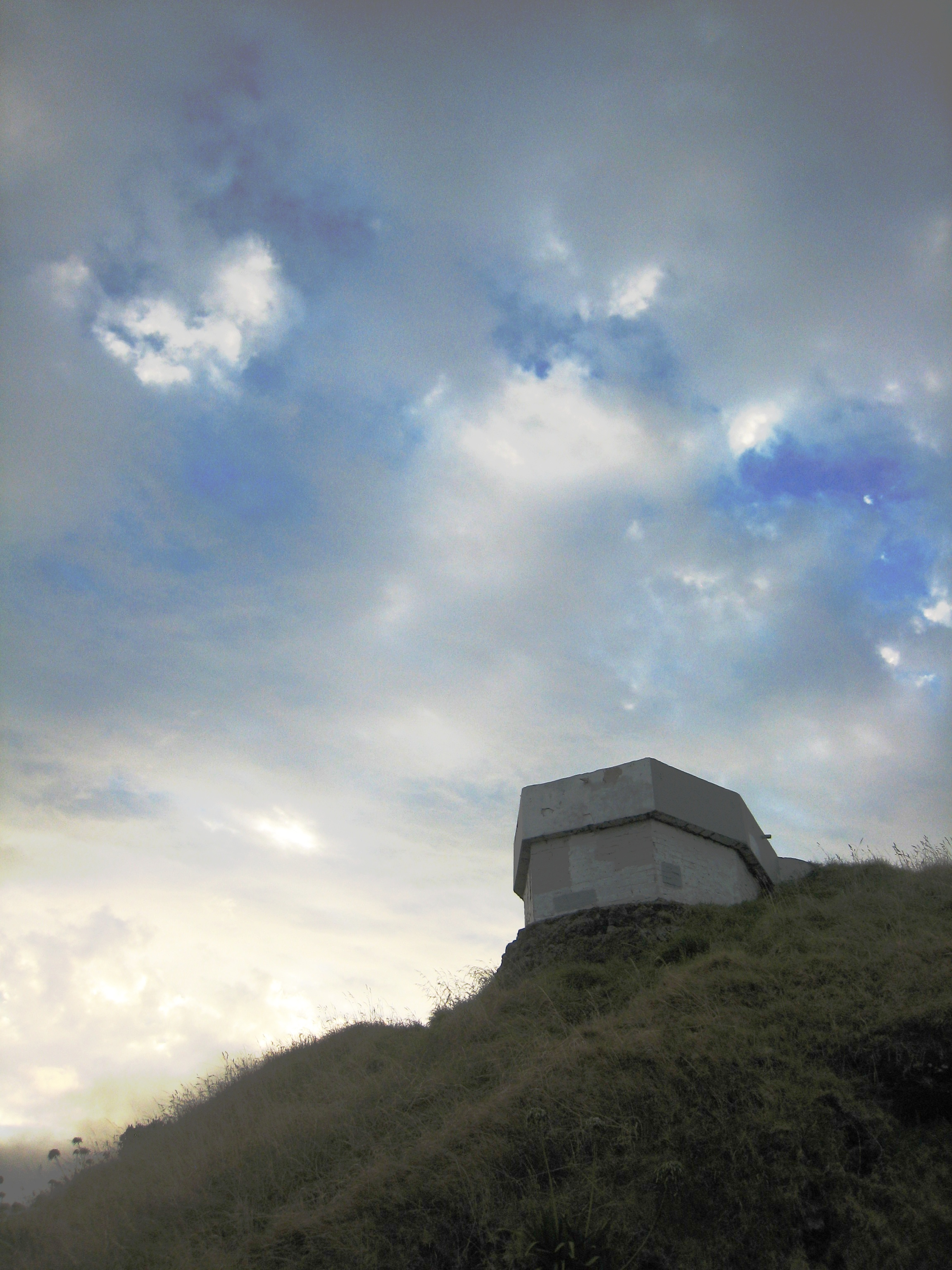
The Bunker, home of the Devonport Folk Club

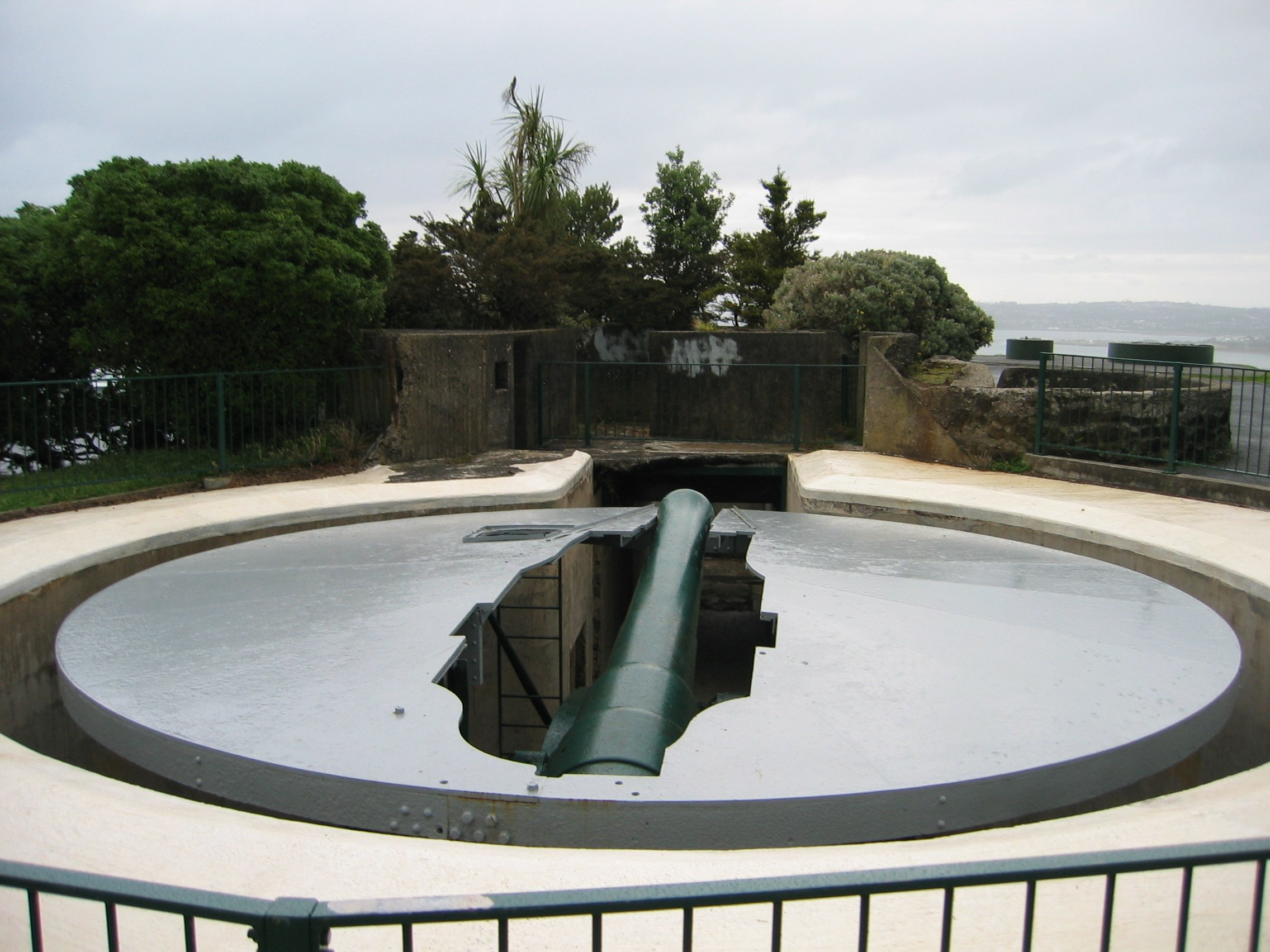
BL 8 inch Mk VII Disappearing gun at the summit of Mount Victoria

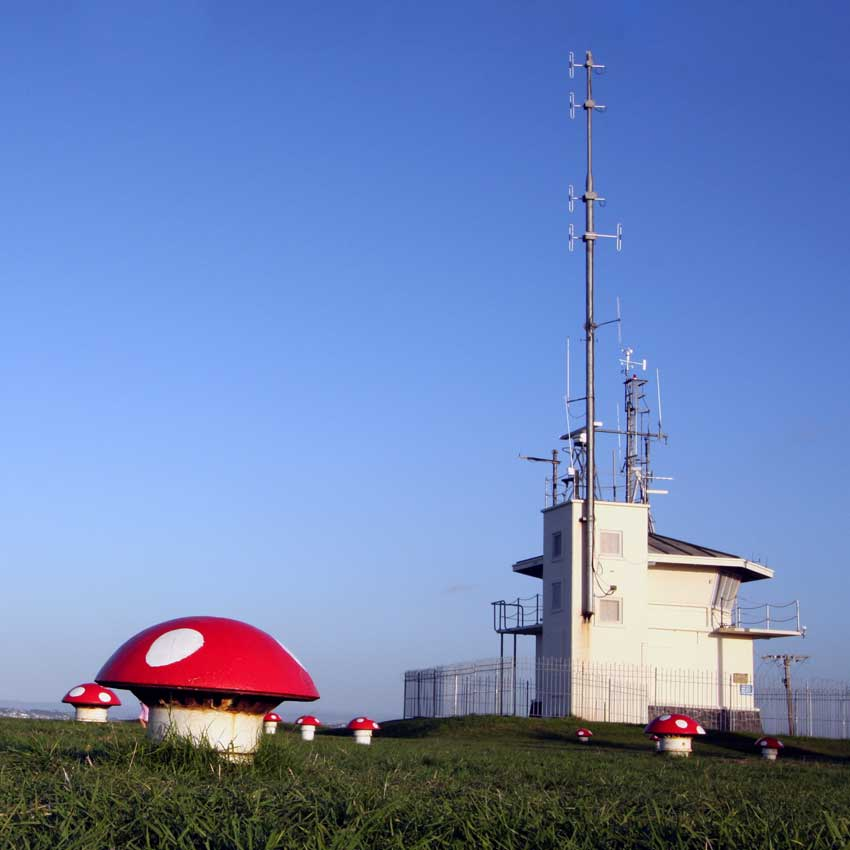
'Mushrooms' on top of the hill, which are in fact vents for a water pumping station
