= Mount Cambria =

Mountain in New Zealand

Coordinates: 36.824444°S 174.801933°E

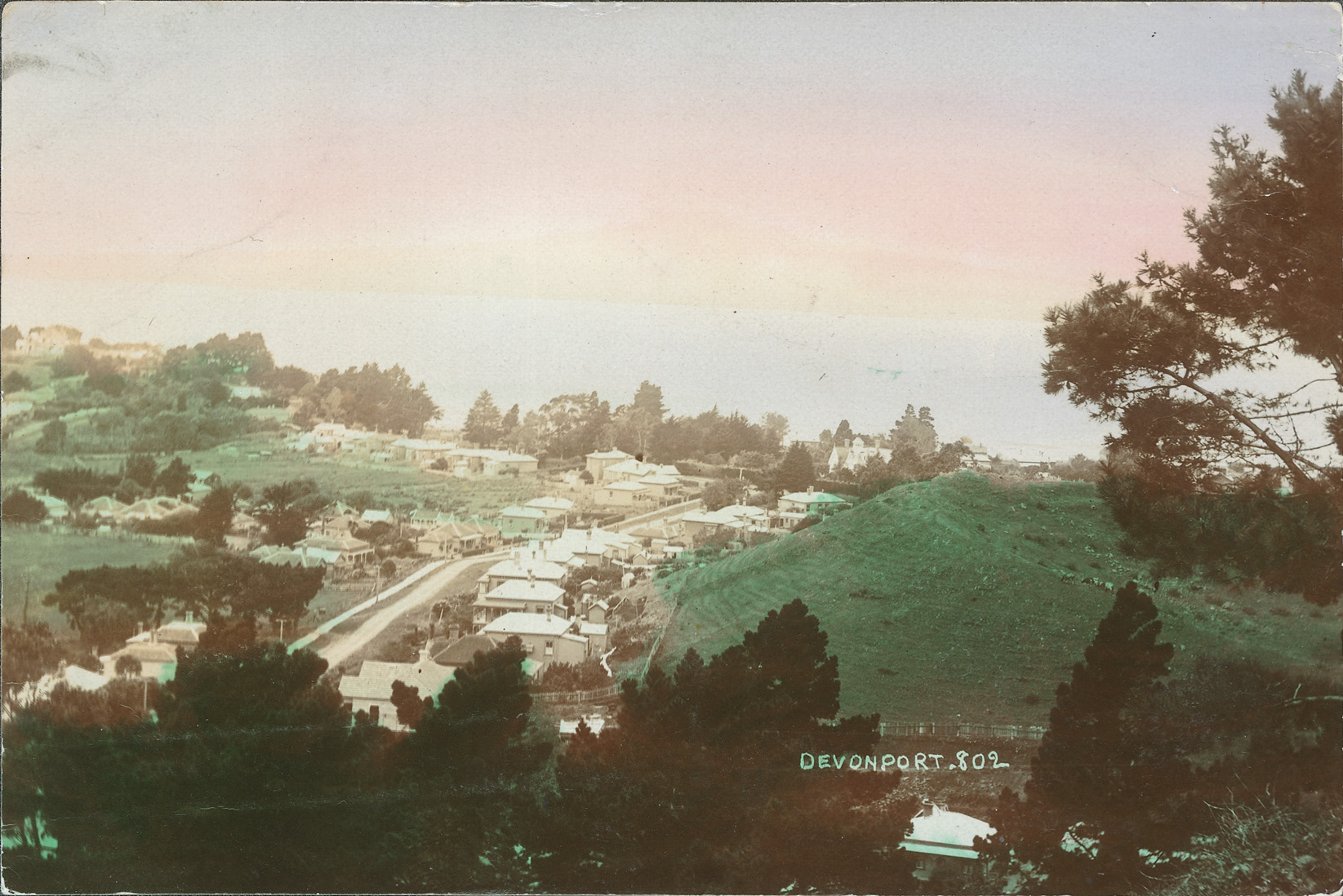
1907 postcard showing Mount Cambria as seen from Mt Victoria

Mount Cambria (also Sheep Hill or Taka-a-raro / Takararo) is one of the volcanoes in the Auckland volcanic field. Located in the suburb of Devonport north-east of Mt Victoria, its 30-metre scoria cone was quarried away. The site is now Cambria Reserve.

== History ==
The hill was traditionally known as Takararo ("The Hill Standing Below"), contrasting with the larger Takarunga / Mount Victoria ("The Hill Standing Above"). It was named Heaphy Hill after Charles Heaphy by Ferdinand von Hochstetter in 1859, but this name is not used. Cambria is the ancient name for Wales.

The hill was quarried between the 1870s and 1977, initially by private contractors and later by the Devonport Borough Council.
