= Duders Hill =

Coordinates: 36.830039°S 174.802949°E

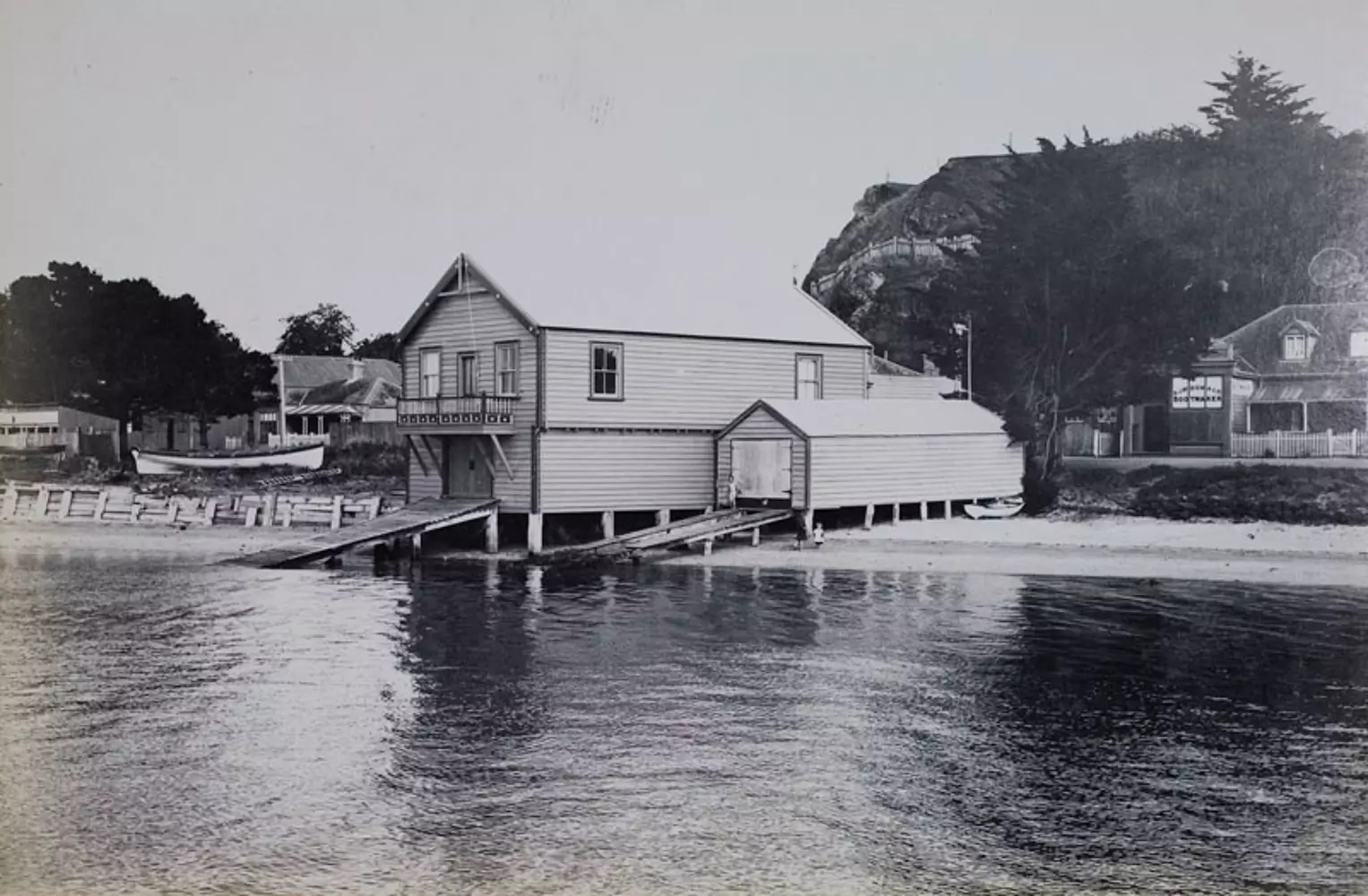
Duders Hill shown behind the North Shore Rowing Club, photographed in 1904

Duders Hill (also Takamaiiwaho) was a 20 metre high scoria mound located on the Devonport coast, on the lower south-east slopes of Takarunga / Mount Victoria, in the Auckland volcanic field. It was mostly quarried away in the early 20th century

== Geology ==
The hill is thought to have been a section of Mount Victoria's upper scoria cone which was rafted downslope with lava flows.
