= Belmont, Auckland =

Belmont
- Suburb
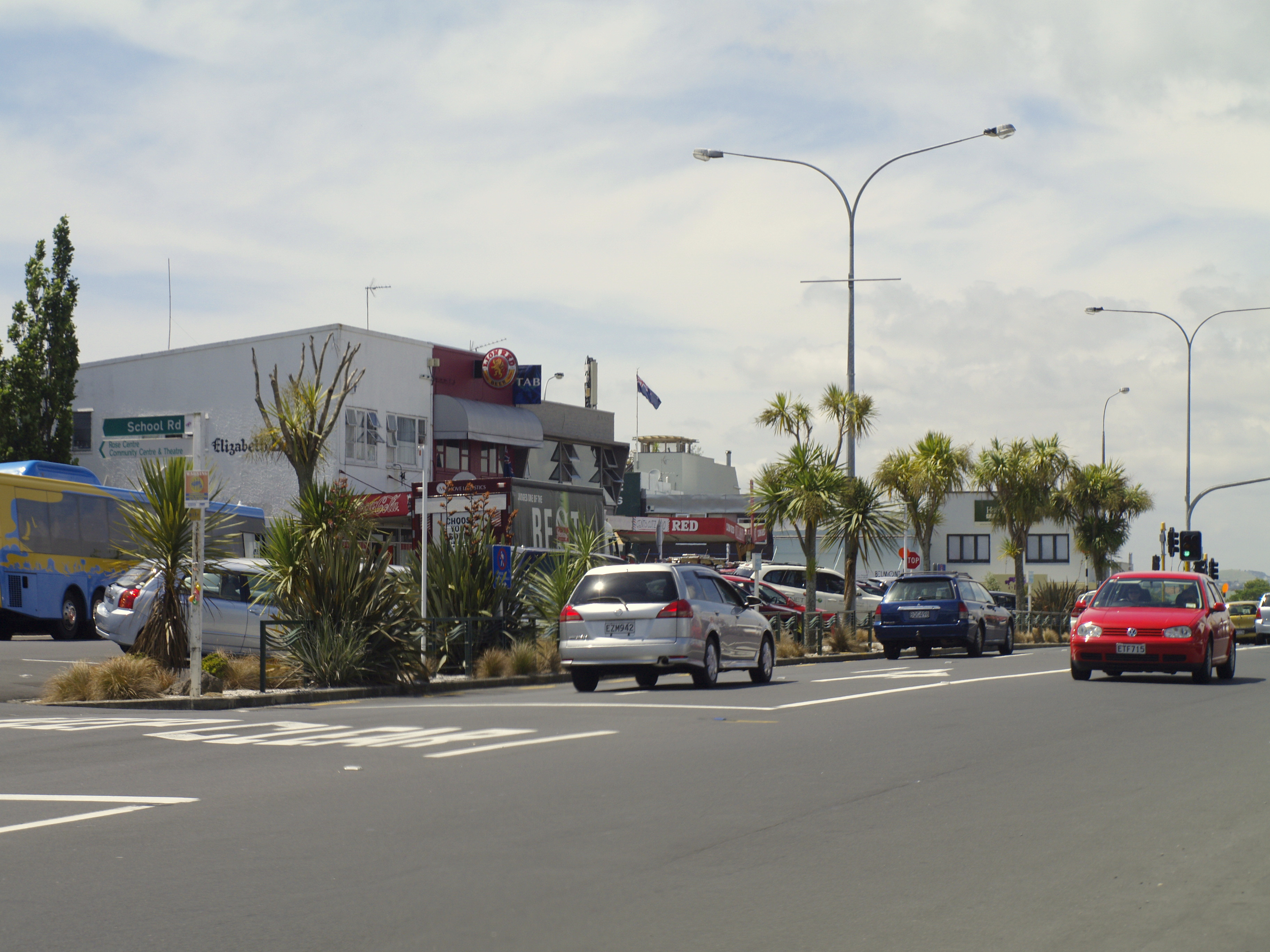
- Shops in central Belmont
- Interactive map of Belmont
- Coordinates: 36.808°S 174.790°E
- Country: New Zealand
- City: Auckland
- Local authority: Auckland Council
- Electoral ward: North Shore ward
- Local board: Devonport-Takapuna Local Board
- Established: 1855

Area
  - Land: 115 ha (280 acres)

Population (June 2025)
  - Total: 3,220
  - Density: 2,800/km^{2} (7,250/sq mi)
- Postcode: 0622

Hauraki	Hauraki	(Hauraki Gulf)
(Shoal Bay)	Belmont	(Hauraki Gulf)
Bayswater	Bayswater	Narrow Neck

Belmont is a suburb of Auckland, New Zealand, located on the North Shore. The suburb is in the North Shore ward, one of the thirteen administrative divisions of Auckland Council.

== Etymology ==
The first references to Belmont on the North Shore date from the mid-1880s. The likely origin of the name (which means "Beautiful Mountain" in French) is that it is a reference to Reverend Roberts' property on Roberts Avenue. The property included a racing stable, which he named after Belmont Park racing track in New York. Roberts held Sunday school services at his home, which the local Presbyterian church continued to use for the Sunday school after a church building had been constructed in 1910. Alternatively Belmont may be a reference to Belmont Heim, the home of the Bull family.

== Geography ==
Belmont is an isthmus on the Devonport Peninsula of the North Shore, located between Shoal Bay and the Rangitoto Channel of the Hauraki Gulf. The suburb is bordered by Hauraki to the north, Bayswater to the southwest and Narrow Neck to the southeast. Saint Leonards Beach is located north of the suburb.

The North Shore is primarily uplifted Waitemata Group sandstone, that was deposited on the sea floor during the Early Miocene, between 22 and 16 million years ago. Prior to human settlement, much of Belmont was a kauri-dominated northern broadleaf podocarp forest, with Pōhutukawa trees being a major feature of the coastline.

== History ==
=== Māori history ===
Māori settlement of the Auckland Region began around the 13th or 14th centuries. The Devonport-Takapuna area was one of the earliest settled in the region, known to be settled by the Tāmaki Māori ancestor Peretū. Toi-te-huatahi and his followers settled and interwed with these early peoples.

Two traditional names are associated with Belmont. Wai-o-Roka, the small tidal inlet of Shoal Bay that separates Belmont from Hauraki, and Takawhenua ("The Fall of the Land"), a place located along the cliffs of the northern shores of the suburb.

=== Early colonial period ===
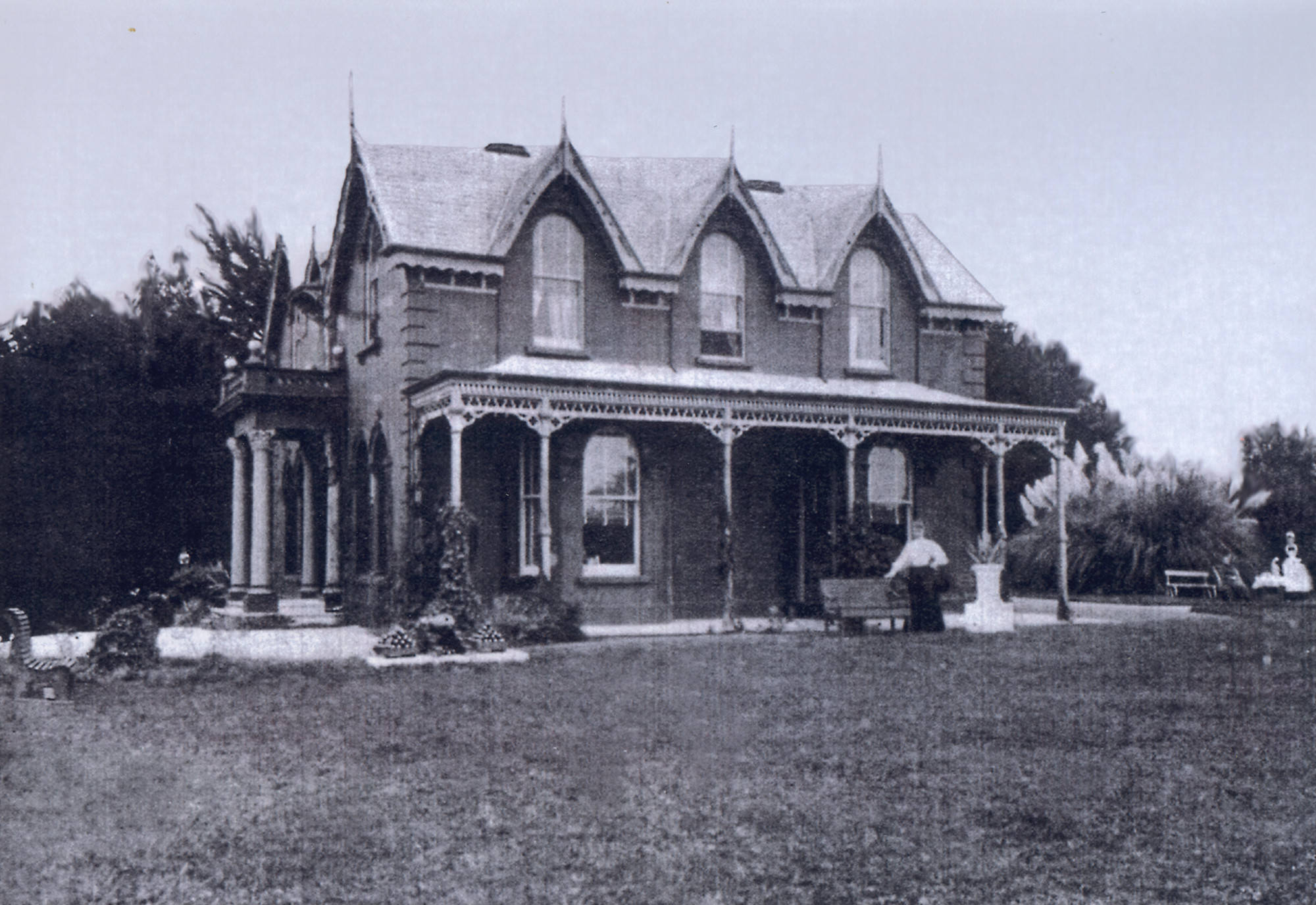
Earnscliffe, aka the Williamson House, was a Victorian manor constructed in 1882

The Belmont area was purchased by the Crown on 13 April 1841 as a part of the Mahurangi Block. The first European farmers arrived in the wider area in the late 1840s. In 1859, a brickworks was established in the suburb on the Shoal Bay coast, and by the 1860s the area between Belmont and O'Neills Point had become important locations where kauri gum diggers could uncover the resource.

By the late 1880s, Takapuna had developed into a destination for tourists, and large summer residences were constructed in the area. One of these residences was Earnscliffe, a Victorian eclectic manor constructed in 1882 for journalist Charles Robert Williamson. Sections of Belmont (which covered modern Belmont and Hauraki.

=== Suburban development ===
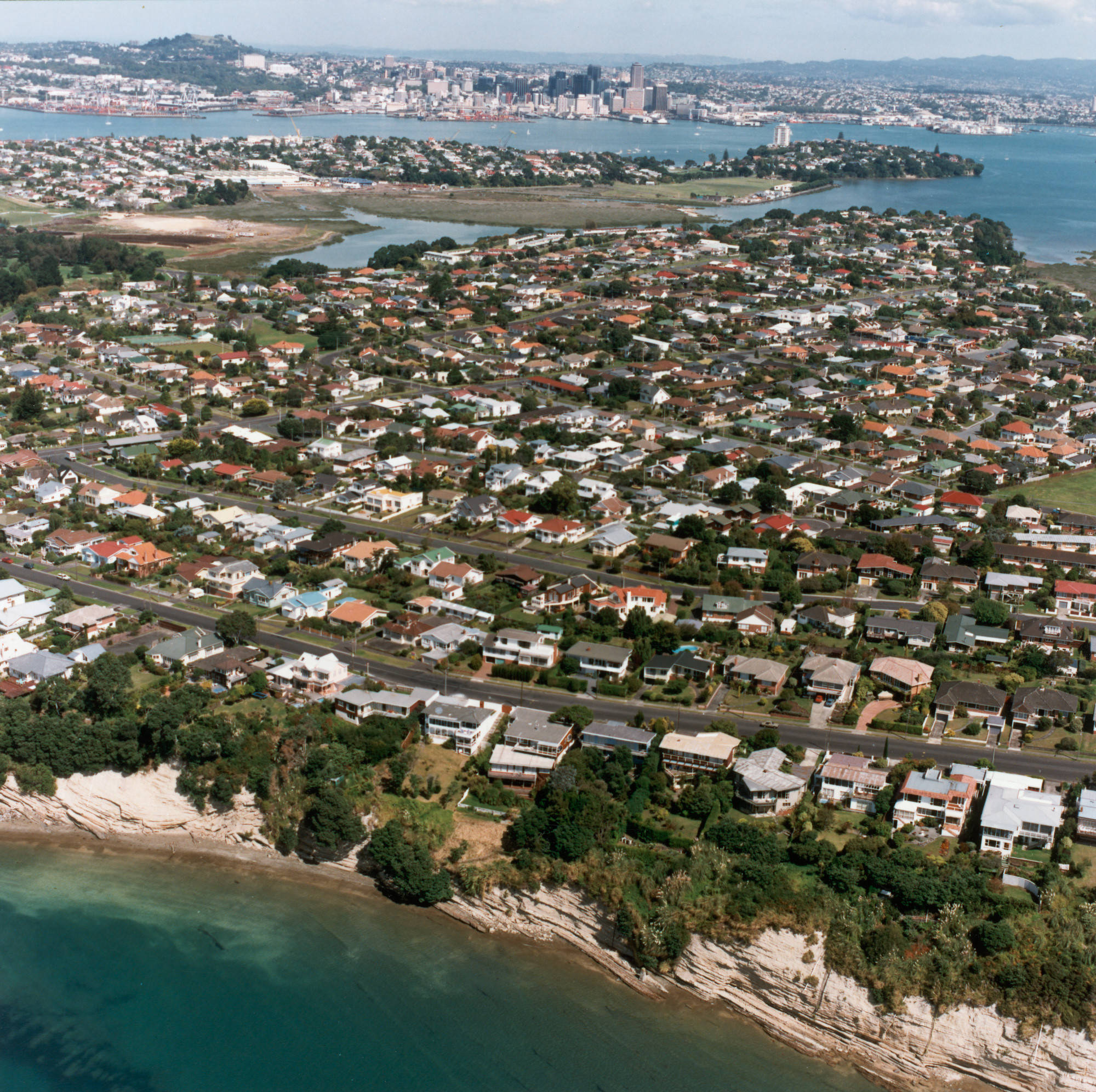
Aerial view of Belmont in 1992

In 1910, a private tramway was established, which conveyed passengers from Milford to the ferry at Bayswater. The plan was a success, leading to rapid suburban development in Takapuna and Belmont. The tramway soon became unpopular due to competition, and closed 17 years later on 26 April 1927.

A Presbyterian church called St Margaret's Church was constructed in May 1910. Belmont Primary School was established in June 1912, first operating from the St Margaret's church hall, until a purpose-build school was opened in 1913. In 1927, Takapuna Grammar School was opened in Belmont.

During the 1950s, the New Zealand Government constructed housing for the staff of Devonport Naval Base at Belmont and Bayswater. In 1952, Belmont Intermediate School was constructed adjacent to Takapuna Grammar, and in 1960 St Luke's Catholic church was built.

In 1992, a performing arts theatre called the Rose Centre was founded in Belmont. Originally founded as a partnership between Belmont School and the Company Theatre, the venue has a 110 seat theatre, pre-school facilities and community meeting rooms.

In the early 2020s, Ngāti Whātua Ōrākei developed Oneoneroa, a housing development on the coast of Shoal Bay in Belmont.

== Demographics ==
Belmont covers 1.15 km^{2} (0.44 sq mi) and had an estimated population of 3,220 as of June 2025, with a population density of 2,800 people per km^{2}.

Historical population
Year	Pop.	±% p.a.
2006	2,808	—
2013	2,946	+0.69%
2018	3,027	+0.54%
2023	3,012	−0.10%

Belmont had a population of 3,012 in the 2023 New Zealand census, a decrease of 15 people (−0.5%) since the 2018 census, and an increase of 66 people (2.2%) since the 2013 census. There were 1,440 males, 1,557 females and 15 people of other genders in 1,104 dwellings. 3.2% of people identified as LGBTIQ+. The median age was 38.0 years (compared with 38.1 years nationally). There were 609 people (20.2%) aged under 15 years, 573 (19.0%) aged 15 to 29, 1,386 (46.0%) aged 30 to 64, and 441 (14.6%) aged 65 or older.

People could identify as more than one ethnicity. The results were 72.0% European (Pākehā); 7.3% Māori; 4.6% Pasifika; 22.2% Asian; 3.6% Middle Eastern, Latin American and African New Zealanders (MELAA); and 0.9% other, which includes people giving their ethnicity as "New Zealander". English was spoken by 94.2%, Māori language by 1.6%, Samoan by 0.6%, and other languages by 25.7%. No language could be spoken by 2.1% (e.g. too young to talk). New Zealand Sign Language was known by 0.2%. The percentage of people born overseas was 40.7, compared with 28.8% nationally.

Religious affiliations were 28.8% Christian, 1.3% Hindu, 0.6% Islam, 0.1% Māori religious beliefs, 1.2% Buddhist, 0.3% New Age, 0.6% Jewish, and 0.8% other religions. People who answered that they had no religion were 60.4%, and 5.9% of people did not answer the census question.

Of those at least 15 years old, 951 (39.6%) people had a bachelor's or higher degree, 993 (41.3%) had a post-high school certificate or diploma, and 453 (18.9%) people exclusively held high school qualifications. The median income was $50,100, compared with $41,500 nationally. 534 people (22.2%) earned over $100,000 compared to 12.1% nationally. The employment status of those at least 15 was that 1,248 (51.9%) people were employed full-time, 309 (12.9%) were part-time, and 75 (3.1%) were unemployed.

== Amenities ==
- Northboro Reserve, a nature reserve and park in western Belmont, along the shoes of Shoal Bay. The reserve is a part of the Takapuna to Devonport Path, a walking and cycling route, The path includes the Bayswater Bridge which connects to Bayswater in the south, which replaced a narrow bridge over a pipeway in 2013.
- George Gair Lookout, a clifftop lookout behind Takapuna Grammar School
- Belmont Baptist Church, located on Lake Road in Belmont
- St Margaret's Church, a Presbyterian church constructed in May 1910.
- The Rose Centre, a community performing arts centre, which features a community park adjacent to the centre.

== Education ==
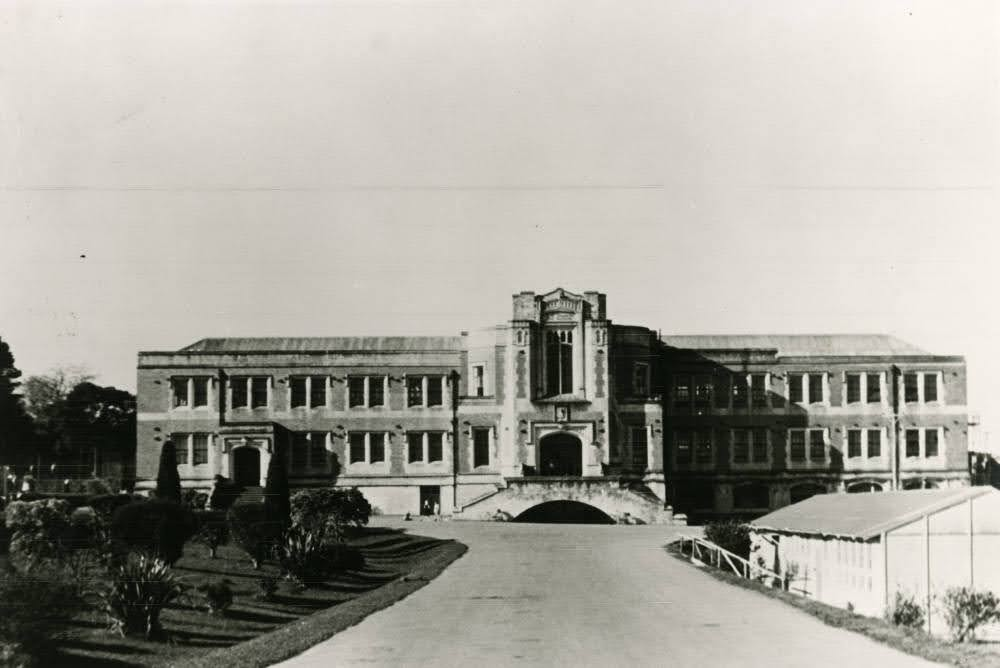
Takapuna Grammar School viewed from the main entrance

Takapuna Grammar School is a secondary (years 9–13) school with a roll of 2,265 students. The adjacent Belmont Intermediate is an intermediate (years 7–8) school with a roll of 518.

Belmont School is a contributing primary (years 1–6) school with a roll of 422. It was founded in 1912 and moved to its current site in 1913.

Wilson School is a special school for students with intellectual or physical disabilities. It has a roll of 136 students. It was previously called the Wilson Home.

All these schools are co-educational. Rolls are as of July 2026.

== Notable people ==
- Corrella — New Zealand roots reggae band who formed on Corrella Road, Belmont

== Local government ==
The first local government in the area was the Lake Highway District, also known as the Takapuna Highway District, which began operating 1867. In June 1889 the road board was dissolved, in favour of Takapuna being under the direct control of the Waitemata County Council. The Borough of Takapuna was established on 1 July 1913, after 73% of electors in Takapuna voted for independence from the Waitemata County, which included Belmont.

After significant growth in population, Takapuna Borough became Takapuna City in 1961. In 1989, Takapuna City was merged into the North Shore City. North Shore City was amalgamated into Auckland Council in November 2010.

Within the Auckland Council, Belmont is a part of the Devonport-Takapuna local government area governed by the Devonport-Takapuna Local Board. It is a part of the North Shore ward, which elects two councillors to the Auckland Council.

== Bibliography ==
- Bartlett, Jean (2001). Takapuna: People and Places (2nd ed.). Auckland: North Shore City Council. ISBN 978-0-473-07877-5. OCLC 973591276. Wikidata Q123755661.
- Christmas, Judith (1983), A History of Northcote, Northcote Borough Council, OCLC 154573998, Wikidata Q123591383
- McClure, Margaret (1987). The Story of Birkenhead. Birkenhead City Council. ISBN 0-908704-04-6. OL 33998949W. Wikidata Q120679112.
- Verran, David (2010), The North Shore: An Illustrated History, North Shore: Random House, OL 33434370W, Wikidata Q120520385
