= Narrow Neck, New Zealand =

Narrow Neck
- Suburb
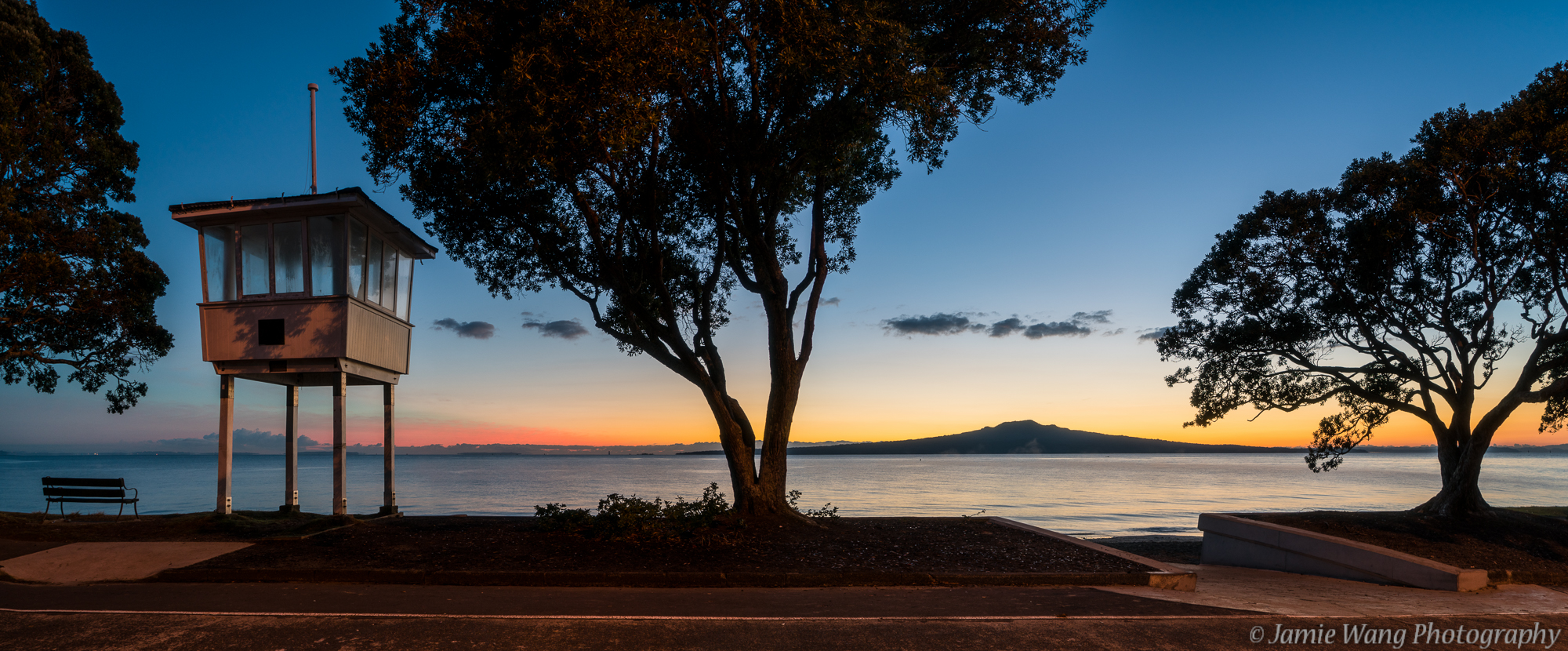
- Narrow Neck Beach with Rangitoto island
- Interactive map of Narrow Neck
- Coordinates: 36°49′S 174°48′E
- Country: New Zealand
- City: Auckland
- Local authority: Auckland Council
- Electoral ward: North Shore ward
- Local board: Devonport-Takapuna Local Board

Area
  - Land: 182 ha (450 acres)

Population (June 2025)
  - Total: 4,540
  - Density: 2,490/km^{2} (6,460/sq mi)
- Postcode: 0624

Belmont	(Hauraki Gulf)	(Hauraki Gulf)
Bayswater	Narrow Neck	(Rangitoto Channel)
Stanley Point	Devonport	Cheltenham

Narrow Neck is a suburb located on the North Shore of Auckland, New Zealand. It is under the local governance of the Auckland Council.

== History ==
Until the mid-19th century, Devonport was connected with the rest of the North Shore by a causeway between Ngataringa Bay and the Hauraki Gulf. This causeway gave the appearance of a "narrow neck". On the eastern side of this strip of land is the Narrow Neck beach, on the western side there was an extensive mangrove swamp. Southeastern Narrow Neck is also known as Vauxhall, which refers to the Vauxhall Gardens established here by pioneer settler William Cobley in the 1870s. These in turn were named after the Vauxhall Gardens in London, some of the gardeners of which were brought out to New Zealand.

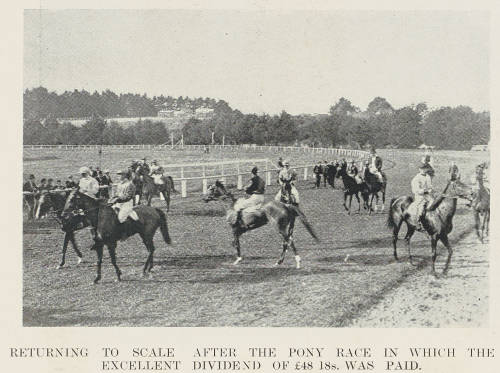
A postcard of a Winter meeting at Takapuna Jockey Club

In the late 19th century the majority of this mangrove swamp was drained and filled in creating land used as The Takapuna Jockey Club's racecourse until the 1930s and subsequently became the Waitamata golf club. The suburb includes Fort Takapuna, From 1927 until the mid-1930s a Royal New Zealand Navy ammunition storage facility was located in the suburb; the munitions were moved to the Kauri Point Armament Depot from 1937. In the World Wars the area was used for a military training camp.

Close to the western edge of the reclaimed area a new road was put through creating a more direct link between Devonport and Takapuna.

== Demographics ==
Narrow Neck covers 1.82 km^{2} (0.70 sq mi) and had an estimated population of 4,540 as of June 2025, with a population density of 2,495 people per km^{2}.

Historical population
Year	Pop.	±% p.a.
2006	3,852	—
2013	3,984	+0.48%
2018	4,098	+0.57%
2023	4,416	+1.51%

Narrow Neck had a population of 4,416 in the 2023 New Zealand census, an increase of 318 people (7.8%) since the 2018 census, and an increase of 432 people (10.8%) since the 2013 census. There were 2,112 males, 2,292 females and 15 people of other genders in 1,656 dwellings. 3.5% of people identified as LGBTIQ+. The median age was 44.6 years (compared with 38.1 years nationally). There were 822 people (18.6%) aged under 15 years, 681 (15.4%) aged 15 to 29, 1,947 (44.1%) aged 30 to 64, and 963 (21.8%) aged 65 or older.

People could identify as more than one ethnicity. The results were 85.9% European (Pākehā); 7.1% Māori; 2.6% Pasifika; 11.1% Asian; 2.2% Middle Eastern, Latin American and African New Zealanders (MELAA); and 0.9% other, which includes people giving their ethnicity as "New Zealander". English was spoken by 96.9%, Māori language by 1.4%, Samoan by 0.4%, and other languages by 15.9%. No language could be spoken by 1.4% (e.g. too young to talk). New Zealand Sign Language was known by 0.3%. The percentage of people born overseas was 34.2, compared with 28.8% nationally.

Religious affiliations were 27.0% Christian, 0.8% Hindu, 0.7% Islam, 0.1% Māori religious beliefs, 1.0% Buddhist, 0.2% New Age, 0.3% Jewish, and 1.1% other religions. People who answered that they had no religion were 63.1%, and 5.6% of people did not answer the census question.

Of those at least 15 years old, 1,584 (44.1%) people had a bachelor's or higher degree, 1,455 (40.5%) had a post-high school certificate or diploma, and 555 (15.4%) people exclusively held high school qualifications. The median income was $49,800, compared with $41,500 nationally. 876 people (24.4%) earned over $100,000 compared to 12.1% nationally. The employment status of those at least 15 was that 1,704 (47.4%) people were employed full-time, 585 (16.3%) were part-time, and 66 (1.8%) were unemployed.

== Education ==
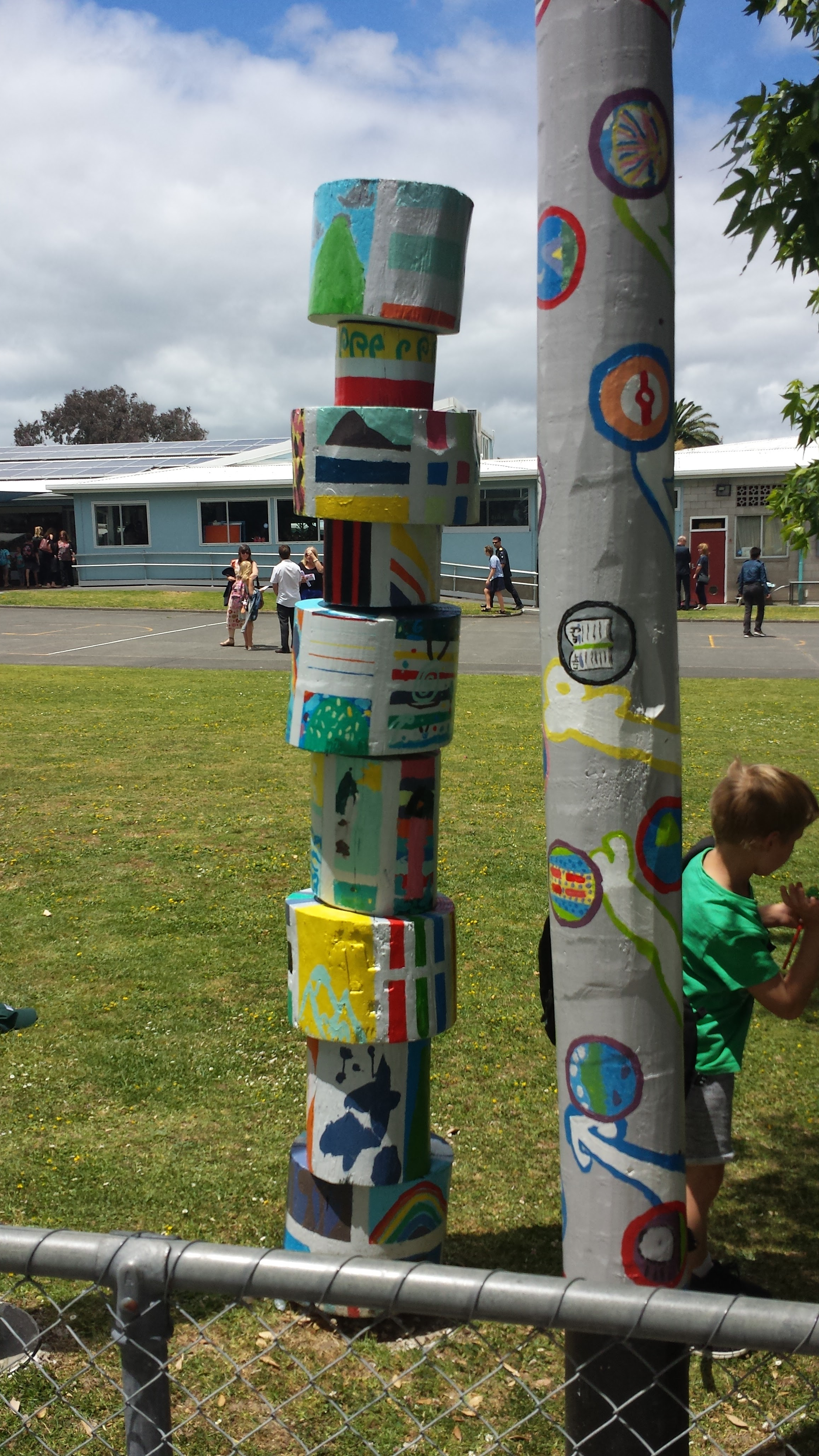
Vauxhall School

Vauxhall School is a coeducational contributing primary school (years 1-6), with a roll of 174 as of July 2025. The school celebrated its Centenary in 2020.
