= Hauraki, Auckland =

Hauraki
- Suburb
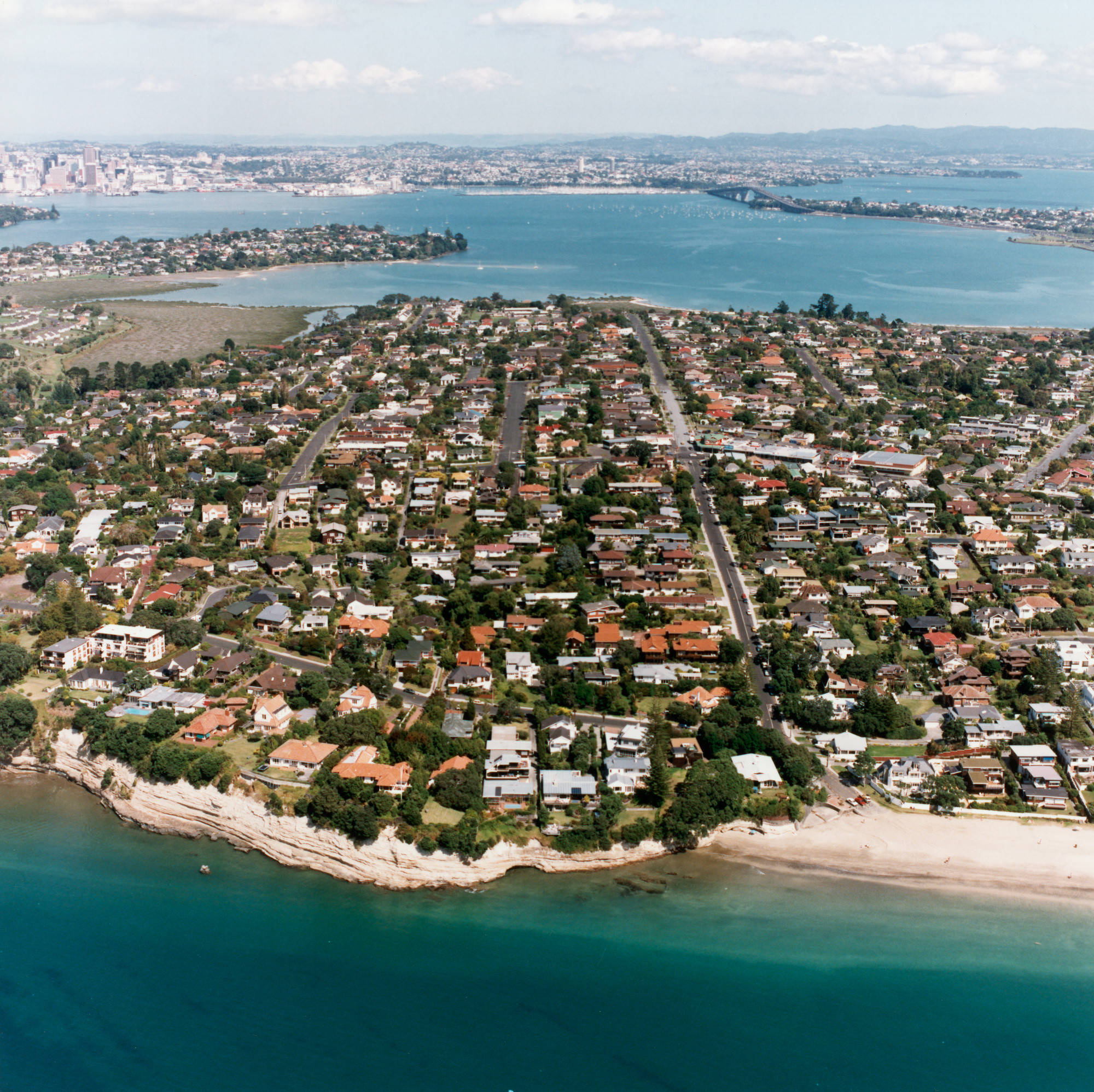
- Hauraki in 1992
- Interactive map of Hauraki
- Coordinates: 36°47′46″S 174°46′40″E
- Country: New Zealand
- City: Auckland
- Local authority: Auckland Council
- Electoral ward: North Shore ward
- Local board: Devonport-Takapuna Local Board

Area
  - Land: 109 ha (270 acres)

Population (June 2025)
  - Total: 4,620
  - Density: 4,240/km^{2} (11,000/sq mi)

Takapuna	(Rangitoto Channel)	(Rangitoto Channel)
(Shoal Bay)	Hauraki	(Rangitoto Channel)
(Shoal Bay)	Bayswater	Belmont

Hauraki is a suburb in the southern North Shore of Auckland, the largest metropolitan city in New Zealand. It is under the local governance of the Auckland Council.

== History ==
The traditional name for the western coastline in Hauraki was Waipaoraora, referring to the shell banks on the tidal flats of Shoal Bay.

== Demographics ==
Hauraki covers 1.09 km^{2} (0.42 sq mi) and had an estimated population of 4,620 as of June 2025, with a population density of 4,239 people per km^{2}.

Historical population
Year	Pop.	±% p.a.
2006	3,792	—
2013	3,969	+0.65%
2018	4,131	+0.80%
2023	4,371	+1.14%

Hauraki had a population of 4,371 in the 2023 New Zealand census, an increase of 240 people (5.8%) since the 2018 census, and an increase of 402 people (10.1%) since the 2013 census. There were 2,115 males, 2,244 females and 9 people of other genders in 1,509 dwellings. 2.9% of people identified as LGBTIQ+. The median age was 37.6 years (compared with 38.1 years nationally). There were 951 people (21.8%) aged under 15 years, 792 (18.1%) aged 15 to 29, 2,076 (47.5%) aged 30 to 64, and 555 (12.7%) aged 65 or older.

People could identify as more than one ethnicity. The results were 70.2% European (Pākehā); 6.5% Māori; 3.2% Pasifika; 25.7% Asian; 3.4% Middle Eastern, Latin American and African New Zealanders (MELAA); and 1.5% other, which includes people giving their ethnicity as "New Zealander". English was spoken by 93.5%, Māori language by 1.2%, Samoan by 0.1%, and other languages by 29.2%. No language could be spoken by 2.2% (e.g. too young to talk). New Zealand Sign Language was known by 0.1%. The percentage of people born overseas was 42.6, compared with 28.8% nationally.

Religious affiliations were 26.1% Christian, 0.8% Hindu, 1.6% Islam, 0.1% Māori religious beliefs, 1.4% Buddhist, 0.5% New Age, 0.5% Jewish, and 1.4% other religions. People who answered that they had no religion were 62.6%, and 4.9% of people did not answer the census question.

Of those at least 15 years old, 1,563 (45.7%) people had a bachelor's or higher degree, 1,362 (39.8%) had a post-high school certificate or diploma, and 498 (14.6%) people exclusively held high school qualifications. The median income was $54,500, compared with $41,500 nationally. 855 people (25.0%) earned over $100,000 compared to 12.1% nationally. The employment status of those at least 15 was that 1,893 (55.4%) people were employed full-time, 495 (14.5%) were part-time, and 93 (2.7%) were unemployed.

== Education ==
Hauraki Primary School is a coeducational contributing primary (years 1–6) school with a roll of 505 as of July 2025. Hauraki Primary School was founded in May 1954. The majority of year sixes transfer to Belmont Intermediate School or Takapuna Normal Intermediate School. Clarinda Franklin has been the principal since 2000.

The Wilson School caters to students aged 5-21 with special needs. It’s part of the Wilson Trust and Te Whatu Ora's Wilson Centre. The school customizes the New Zealand Curriculum to suit individual learning requirements, emphasizing literacy, numeracy, and communication. It also nurtures social and physical skills, promoting independence. Wilson School prioritizes family engagement and maintains open communication with parents to enhance student learning outcomes.
