= Belmont Intermediate School =

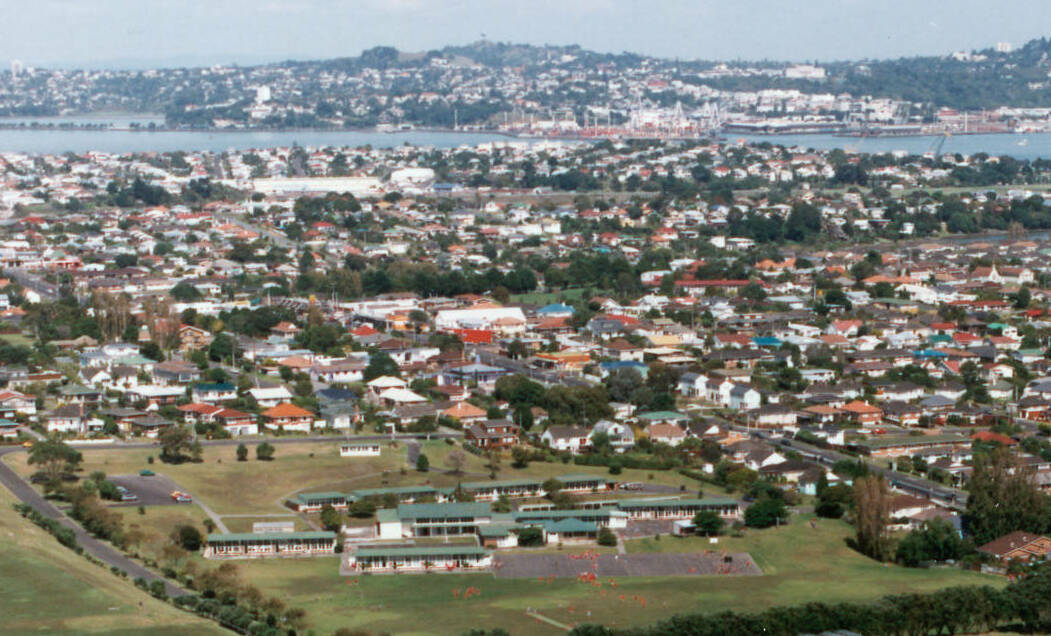
- Belmont Intermediate School (below) in 1992

Location
- 10 Winscombe Street; Belmont; Auckland 0622; New Zealand; 36.8038°S 174.7896°E

Information
- Type: State co-ed intermediate, years 7-8
- Motto: Developing confident and successful lifelong learners
- Established: 1957
- Ministry of Education Institution no.: 1225
- Principal: Nick Hill
- Enrolment: 616 (July 2026)
- Socio-economic decile: 10
- Website: www.belmontint.school.nz

Belmont Intermediate School is a state coeducational intermediate school located in Belmont on the North Shore of Auckland, New Zealand. It was established in 1957.

Contributing schools include:

- Devonport Primary
- Vauxhall Primary
- Stanley Bay Primary
- Hauraki Primary
- St. Leos
- Belmont Primary
- Bayswater Primary

Pupils attend for years seven and eight. At the end of year eight the majority of students move to Takapuna Grammar School, which is located next door.

School facilities include a technology block, ICT suite, school hall, information centre and a learning support centre. The grounds are extensive and numerous groups make use of its facilities during the weekends.

== Cycling to school ==
The school is famous for having achieved the highest rate of students cycling to school in the Auckland Region, at about 200 of 500 students on a normal day, a results considered to be partly due to the environment around the school and the Lake Road cycle lanes. At the same time, the level of students driven to school by car is very low, at only about 11% arrive by car.

In 2010, after being nominated by Cycle Action Auckland, the school won the national Cycle Friendly Awards in the "commitment by a public organisation", sponsored by ASB Bank.

== Notable alumni ==
- Ella Yelich-O'Connor, aka Lorde (2008–2009), singer-songwriter.
- Eliza McCartney, (2008-2009), NZ olympian Bronze Medalist, Rio 2016
