= Devonport-Takapuna Local Board =

Auckland Council Local Board

Coordinates: 36°47′22″S 174°46′23″E

- Te Poari ā-Rohe o Devonport-Takapuna
- Local board for the Auckland Council
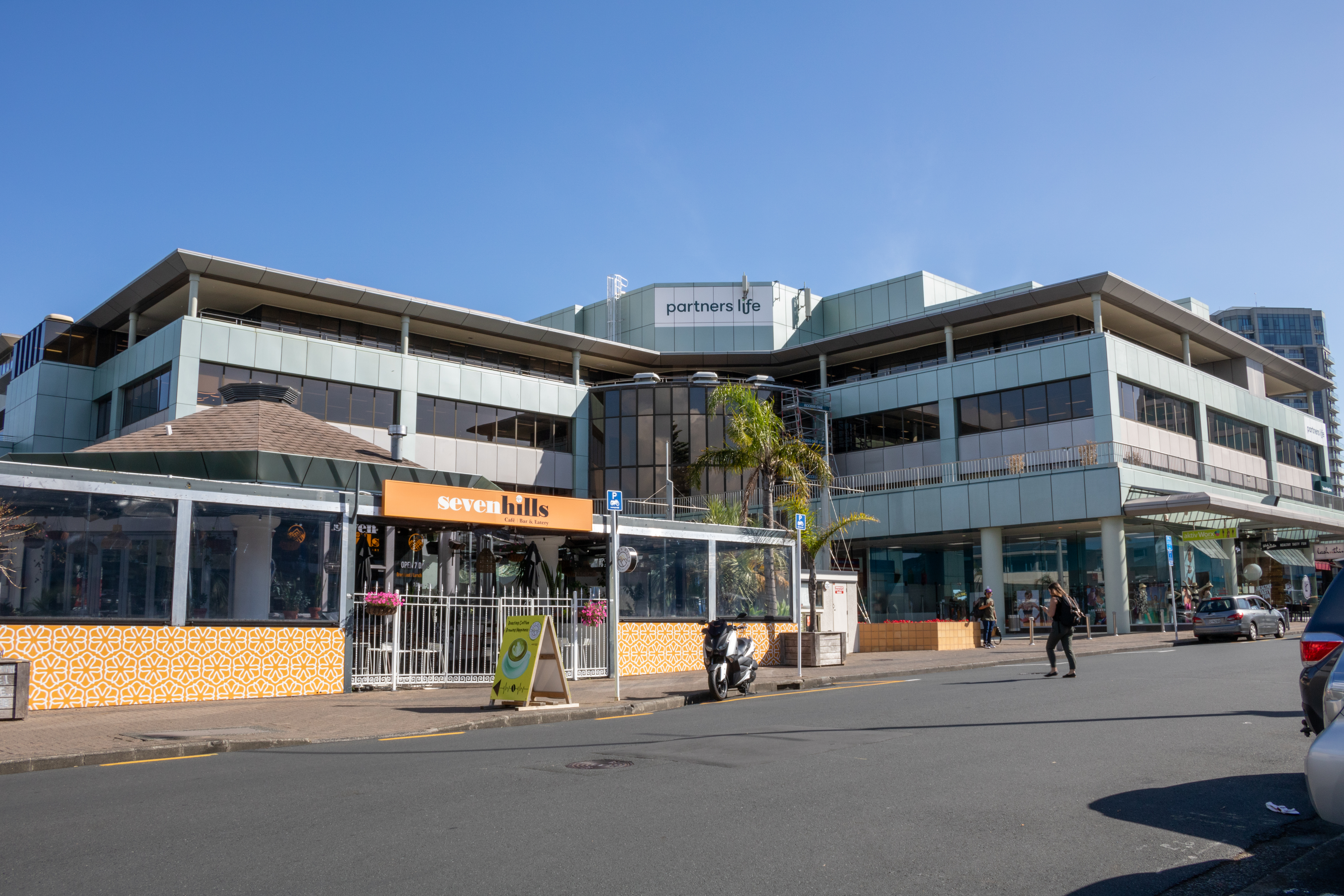
- The former North Shore City Council Building, housing the Devonport-Takapuna Local Board Office on the ground floor

- Location of within Auckland
- Ward: North Shore Ward
- Region: Auckland
- Population: 61,100, June 2025
- Electorate: Devonport-Takapuna
- Major settlements: Bayswater; Belmont; Castor Bay; Devonport; Forrest Hill; Milford; Narrow Neck; Stanley Point; Sunnynook; Takapuna

Current Local board
- Created: 2010
- Number of members: 6
- Parties: A Fresh Approach (2); C & R (2); Independents (2)
- Board Members: Trish Deans; Scott MacArthur; Terence Harpur; George Wood CNZM; Gavin Busch; Garth Ellingham
- Chairperson: Trish Deans
- Deputy Chairperson: Scott MacArthur
- Last Election: 2025
- Next Election: 2028
- Meeting Place: 1 The Strand, Takapuna

The Devonport-Takapuna Local Board covers from Castor Bay and Sunnynook south to the end of the Devonport Peninsula; it is separated from the Kaipātiki board area by the Northern Motorway. This local board sits in the Auckland Council office buildings on The Strand in Takapuna. These were the North Shore City Council offices until the North Shore City Council was merged into Auckland Council in 2010. It is part of the North Shore Ward of Auckland Council, which also includes the Kaipātiki Local Board.

== Geography ==
The local board area includes the major suburbs of Devonport and Takapuna. It also includes the smaller suburbs of Castor Bay, Forrest Hill, Milford, Lake Pupuke, Belmont, Narrow Neck, Stanley Bay, Bayswater and Shoal Bay.

The area extends from Sunnynook and Castor Bay in the north, to Stanley Bay and Devonport in the south, to State Highway 1. It features Mt Victoria, North Head, and the large volcanic crater of Lake Pupuke.

== 2025-2028 term ==
The current board members for the 2025-2028 term, elected at the 2025 local elections, are:

Name	Affiliation	Position
Trish Deans	Independent	Chairperson
Scott MacArthur	A Fresh Approach	Deputy Chairperson
Terence Harpur	A Fresh Approach	Board member
George Wood	Communities and Residents	Board member
Gavin Busch	Communities and Residents	Board member
Garth Ellingham		Board member

== 2022-2025 term ==
The board members for the 2022-2025 term, elected at the 2022 local elections, were:

Name	Ticket (if any)	Position
Toni van Tonder	A Fresh Approach	Chairperson
Terence Harpur	A Fresh Approach	Deputy Chairperson
George Wood CNZM	C & R North Shore	Board member
Melissa Powell	A Fresh Approach	Board member
Gavin Busch	C & R North Shore	Board member
Peter Allen	A Fresh Approach	Board member

== Election results ==
=== 2019 results ===
Name	Affiliation	Votes
Aidan Bennett	A Fresh Approach	7258
Jan O'Connor	Heart of the Shore	6825
George Wood	Team George Wood	6141
Toni van Tonder	A Fresh Approach	6088
Ruth Jackson	Heart of the Shore	5903
Trish Deans	Heart of the Shore	5687
Michael Sheehy	Team George Wood	5226
Danny Watson	A Fresh Approach	5081
Paul Cornish	Keep our Open Spaces	4898
Jenn McKenzie	Team George Wood	4564
Iain Rea	Heart of the Shore	4370
Ian Revell	Team George Wood	4282
Gavin Busch	Team George Wood	4275
Donald Horsborugh	Independent	2803
Mary-Anne Benson-Cooper	Independent	2657
John Wood	Future Focus	2286
Kevin Brett	The Trump New Zealand Party	905
Dorothea Akenese Scanlan	The Trump New Zealand Party	643
INFORMAL		74
BLANK		1039

=== 2016 results ===
Name	Affiliation	Votes	
Mary-Ann Benson-Cooper	Independent	3,736	
Kevin Brett	Independent	1,391	
Gavin Busch	Team George Wood	4,858	
Don Campbell	none	2,383	
Mike Cohen	Community Before Council	8,687	✔
Trish Deans	Shore Action	5,262	
Fay Freeman	Auckland Future	4,337	
Grant Gillon	Shore Action	7,640	✔
John Hill	Independent	1,782	
Nick Kearney	Team George Wood	4,917	
Rohan Lord	Shore Action	4,560	
Jennifer McKenzie	Team George Wood	5,375	✔
Jan O'Connor	Shore Action	6,688	✔
Ian Revell	Team George Wood	4,929	
Michael Sheehy	Team George Wood	5,642	✔
Bruce Tubb	Independent	2,043	
Garry Venus	Shore Action	4,509	
George Wood	Team George Wood	8,099	✔
INFORMAL		114	
BLANK		1,218	

=== 2013 results ===
Name	Affiliation	Votes	Elected	#
Aidan Bennett	Shore Future	4,650	✘	
Mary-Anne Benson-Cooper	Independent	2,490	✘	
Joseph Bergin	Fair Deal For Shore	6,377	✔	
Kevin Brett	Independent	913	✘	
Mike Cohen	Community Before Council	7,072	✔	3
Chris Darby	Shore Future	9,443	✔	(-)
Chris Darby	Withdrew after elected North Shore Ward Councillor	9,443	✔	(-)
Dave Donaldson	Shore Future	4,278	✘	
Deborah Dougherty	Conservative	1,843	✘	
Grant Gillon	Team of Independents	7,185	✔	2
Dianne Hale	Shore Future	6,628	✔	5
Craig Hans Jensen	Conservative	1,743	✘	
Jan O'Connor	Team of Independents	6,774	✔	4
Bill Rayner	Shore Community – Shore Seniors	3,322	✘	
Allison Roe	Shore Future	7,320	✔	1
Michael Sheehy	Independent	4,165	✘	
Tracy Gwen Talbot	Shore Future	4,157	✘	
David Thornton	NoMoreRates	3,117	✘	
Anthony Wareham	Independent	2,519	✘	
INFORMAL		108		
BLANK		523		

== Board chairs ==
The board chair is the head of the six-person board elected by the board in their first meeting. Often the chair and deputy chair alternate 18 month periods of the three-year term. Grant Gillon was chair followed by George Wood from early 2018.

== Demographics ==
Devonport-Takapuna Local Board Area covers 20.09 km^{2} (7.76 sq mi) and had an estimated population of 61,100 as of June 2025, with a population density of 3,041 people per km^{2}.

Historical population
Year	Pop.	±% p.a.
2006	52,653	—
2013	55,470	+0.75%
2018	57,975	+0.89%
2023	58,005	+0.01%

Devonport-Takapuna had a population of 58,005 in the 2023 New Zealand census, an increase of 30 people (0.1%) since the 2018 census, and an increase of 2,535 people (4.6%) since the 2013 census. There were 28,125 males, 29,691 females and 189 people of other genders in 21,378 dwellings. 3.2% of people identified as LGBTIQ+. The median age was 40.8 years (compared with 38.1 years nationally). There were 9,954 people (17.2%) aged under 15 years, 10,839 (18.7%) aged 15 to 29, 26,847 (46.3%) aged 30 to 64, and 10,362 (17.9%) aged 65 or older.

People could identify as more than one ethnicity. The results were 66.4% European (Pākehā); 6.2% Māori; 2.9% Pasifika; 29.0% Asian; 3.1% Middle Eastern, Latin American and African New Zealanders (MELAA); and 2.0% other, which includes people giving their ethnicity as "New Zealander". English was spoken by 93.6%, Māori language by 1.1%, Samoan by 0.4%, and other languages by 30.2%. No language could be spoken by 1.7% (e.g. too young to talk). New Zealand Sign Language was known by 0.2%. The percentage of people born overseas was 44.8, compared with 28.8% nationally.

Religious affiliations were 31.0% Christian, 1.5% Hindu, 1.6% Islam, 0.2% Māori religious beliefs, 1.6% Buddhist, 0.3% New Age, 0.3% Jewish, and 1.1% other religions. People who answered that they had no religion were 56.8%, and 5.8% of people did not answer the census question.

Of those at least 15 years old, 20,553 (42.8%) people had a bachelor's or higher degree, 18,864 (39.3%) had a post-high school certificate or diploma, and 8,622 (17.9%) people exclusively held high school qualifications. The median income was $50,700, compared with $41,500 nationally. 10,323 people (21.5%) earned over $100,000 compared to 12.1% nationally. The employment status of those at least 15 was that 24,648 (51.3%) people were employed full-time, 6,819 (14.2%) were part-time, and 1,143 (2.4%) were unemployed.
