= Rangitoto Channel =

Navigable waterway between Rangitoto Island and the Devonport Peninsula

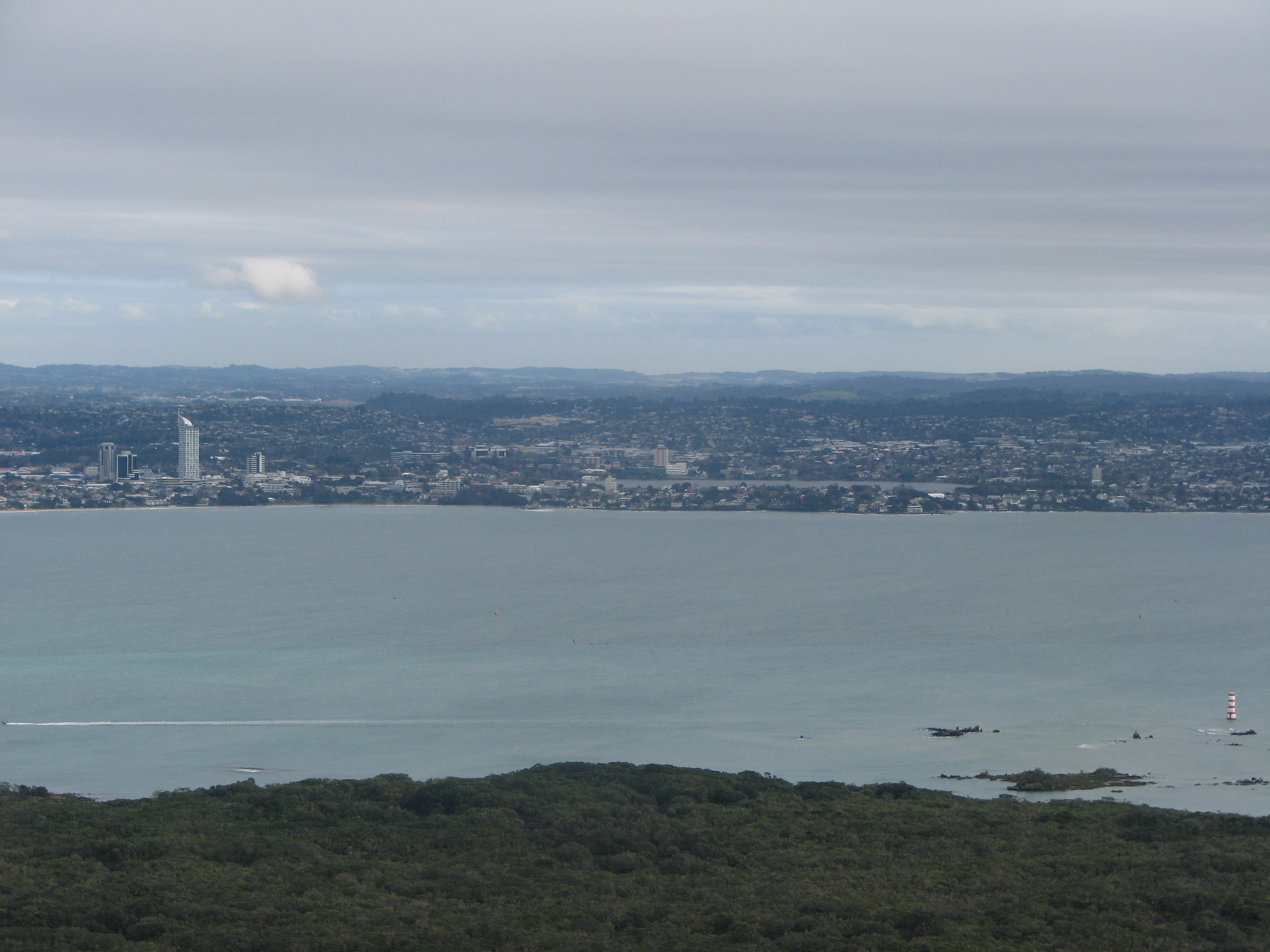
- The Rangitoto Channel, looking west towards the North Shore from Rangitoto Island.

- Location within the Auckland Region
- Location: Auckland Region, New Zealand
- Coordinates: 36.803°S 174.817°E
- River sources: Wairau Creek
- Ocean/sea sources: Hauraki Gulf, Pacific Ocean
- Basin countries: New Zealand
- Islands: Duder Spit, Rangitoto Island
- Settlements: Belmont, Devonport, Hauraki, Milford, Narrow Neck, Takapuna

The Rangitoto Channel is an area of the Hauraki Gulf in the Auckland Region of New Zealand's North Island. The channel is north-east of the Waitematā Harbour, and is located between the North Shore and Rangitoto Island. The channel's traditional Ngāi Tai name is Te Awanui o Peretū, and is an important deep water shipping channel to reach the Ports of Auckland.

== Geography ==
The Rangitoto Channel is located in Auckland, between the North Shore and Rangitoto Island. During the Last Glacial Maximum (known locally as the Ōtira Glaciation), the area was a valley for the Waitematā River, which when sea levels rose between 12,000 and 7,000 years ago became the Waitematā Harbour. The channel is an important stretch of water as it is the only deep water approach to Auckland Port for large ships such as container cargo ships and passenger cruise liners.

== History ==
The traditional Ngāi Tai name for the Rangitoto Channel is Te Awanui o Peretū or "The Great Channel of Peretū", named after an early ancestor in Tāmaki Makaurau, who lived at Narrow Neck and kept a kākā parrot reserve on Rangitoto Island. The channel was visited by the Tainui migratory canoe after arriving in Tāmaki Makaurau.

During the Russian scare of the 1880s, coastal fortifications were built along the Rangitoto Channel, including a fort at North Head and a military camp, Fort Cautley, at Narrow Neck. These were upgraded during World War II, and further gun emplacements were constructed at Castor Bay and other East Coast Bays areas to the north.

The channel was last dredged from a depth of 11.2m to 12.5m in a two-stage process in 2004. The first stage involved the mechanical excavation of hard rock. Blasting was not required. This was followed by the removal of softer material. All dredged material was used in the reclamation at Fergusson wharf.

== Gallery ==
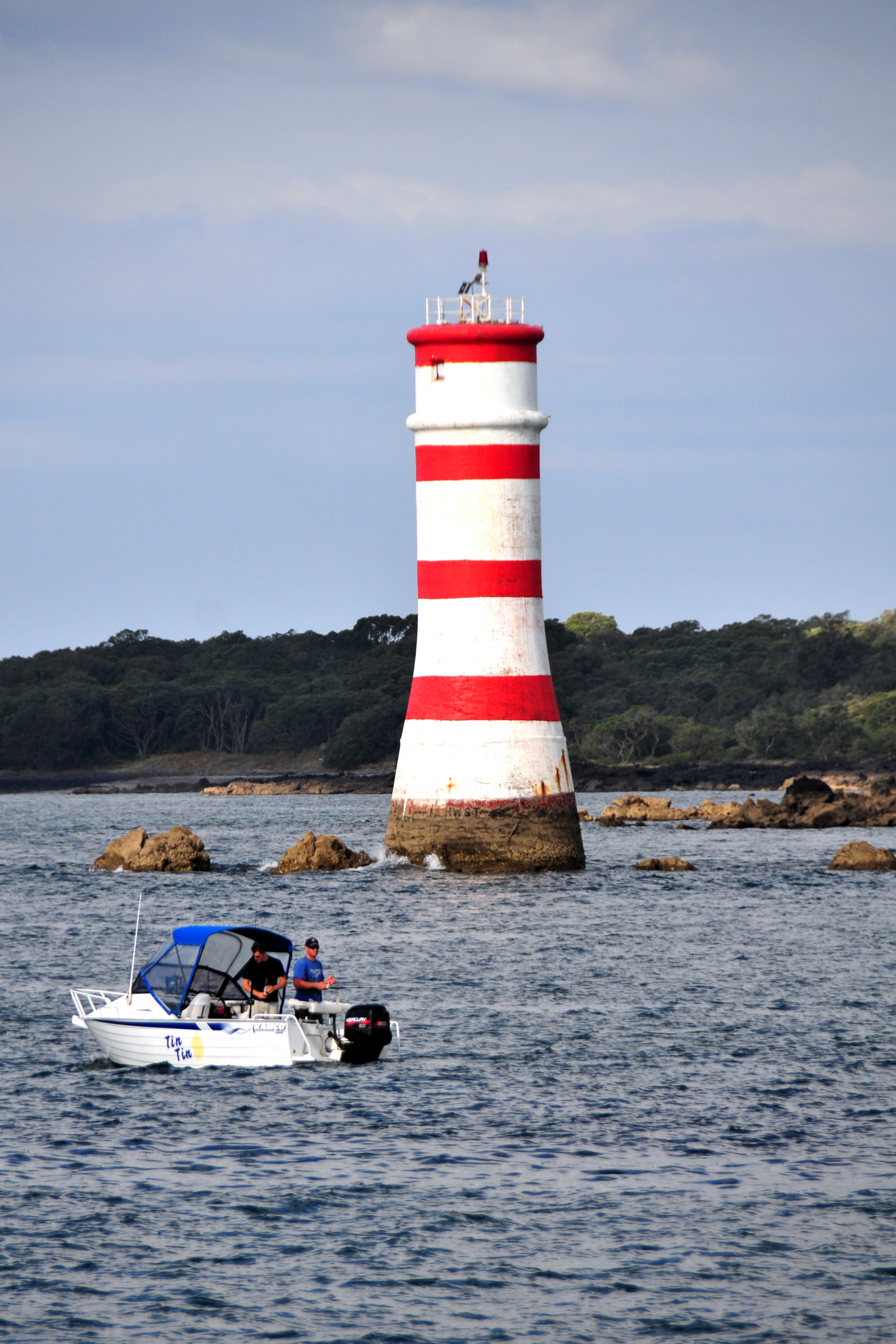
The Rangitoto Lighthouse is located along the Rangitoto Channel

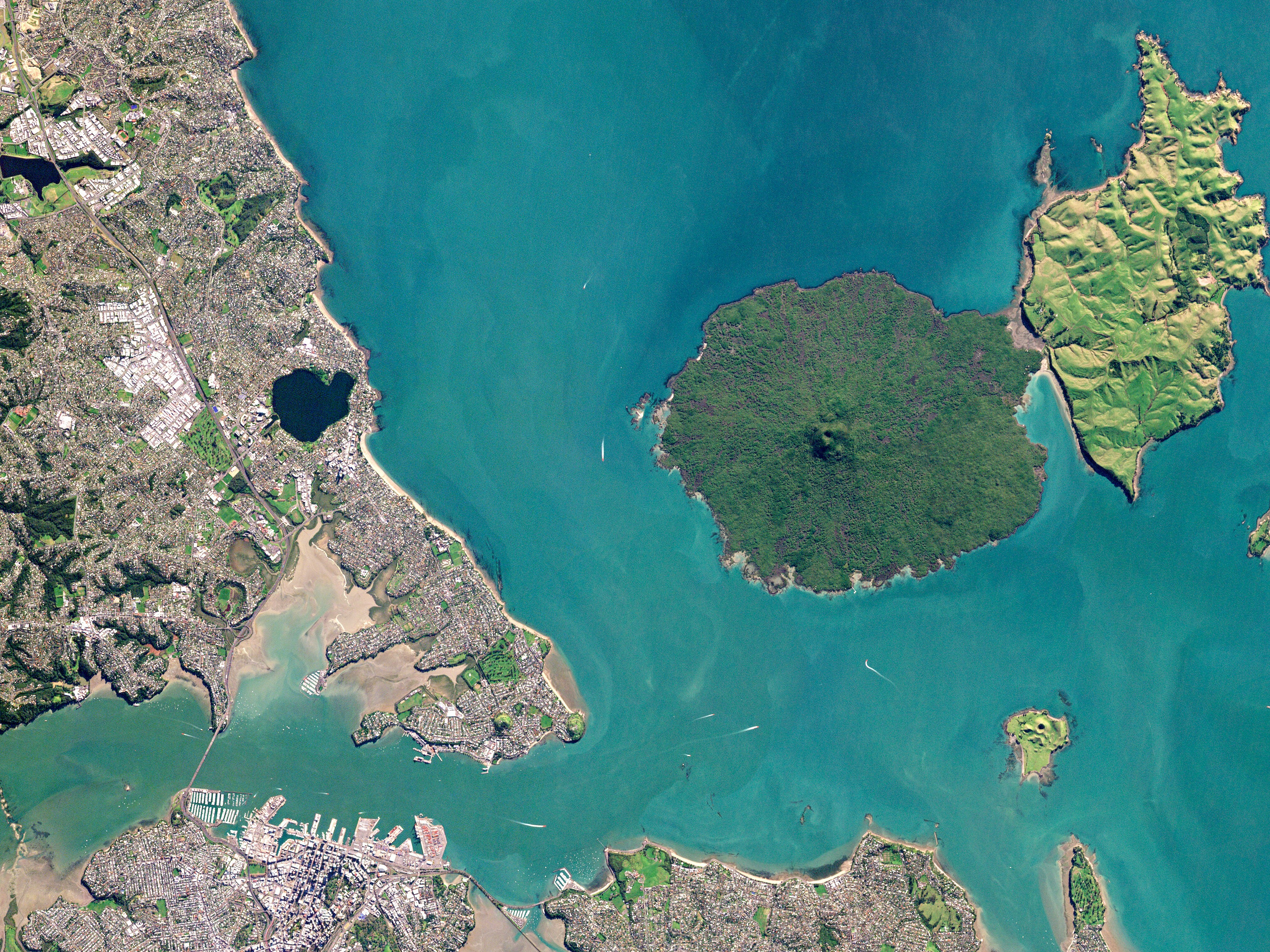
Satellite view of Rangitoto Channel

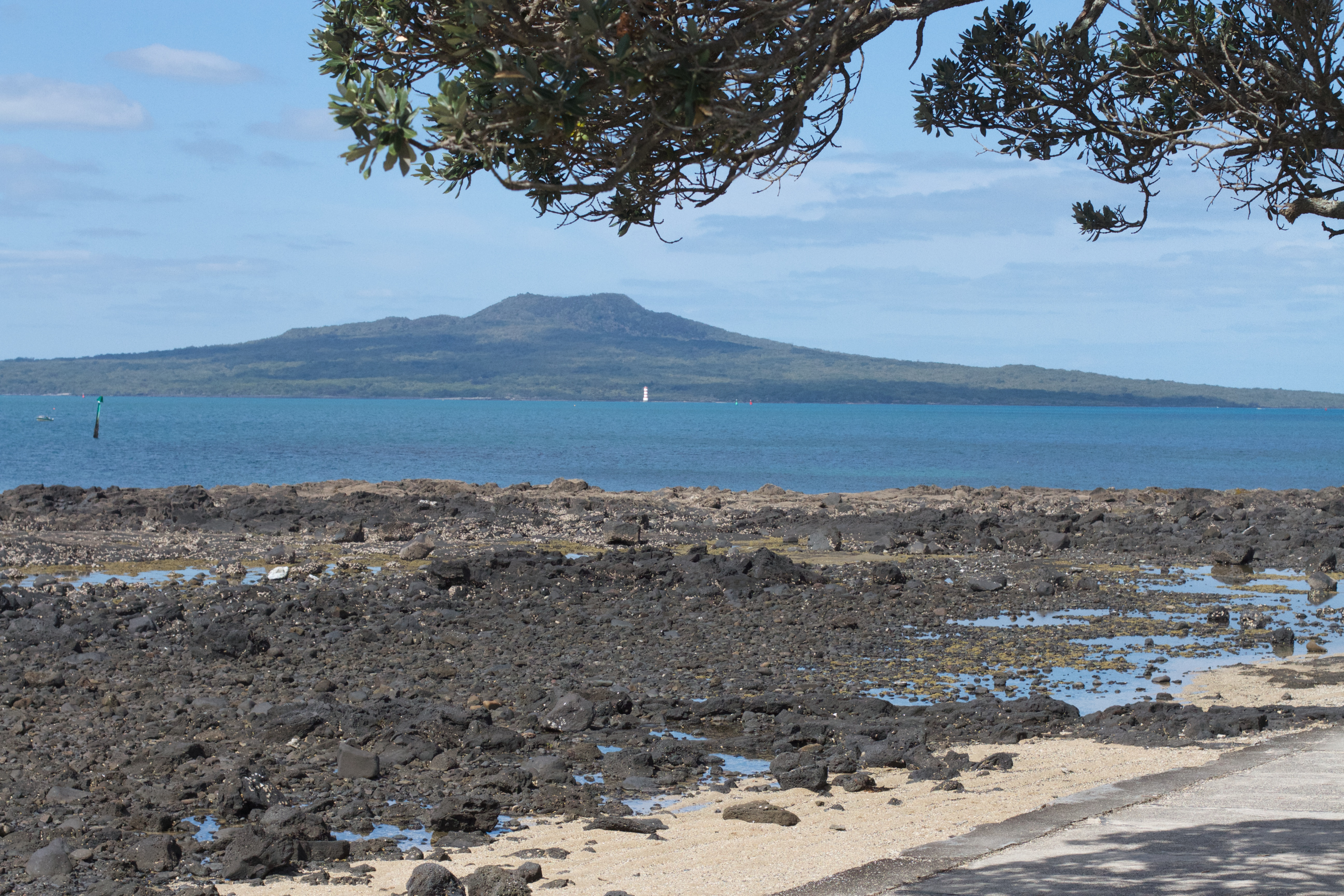
View of Rangitoto Island from Milford Beach
