= Stanley Point =

- Suburb
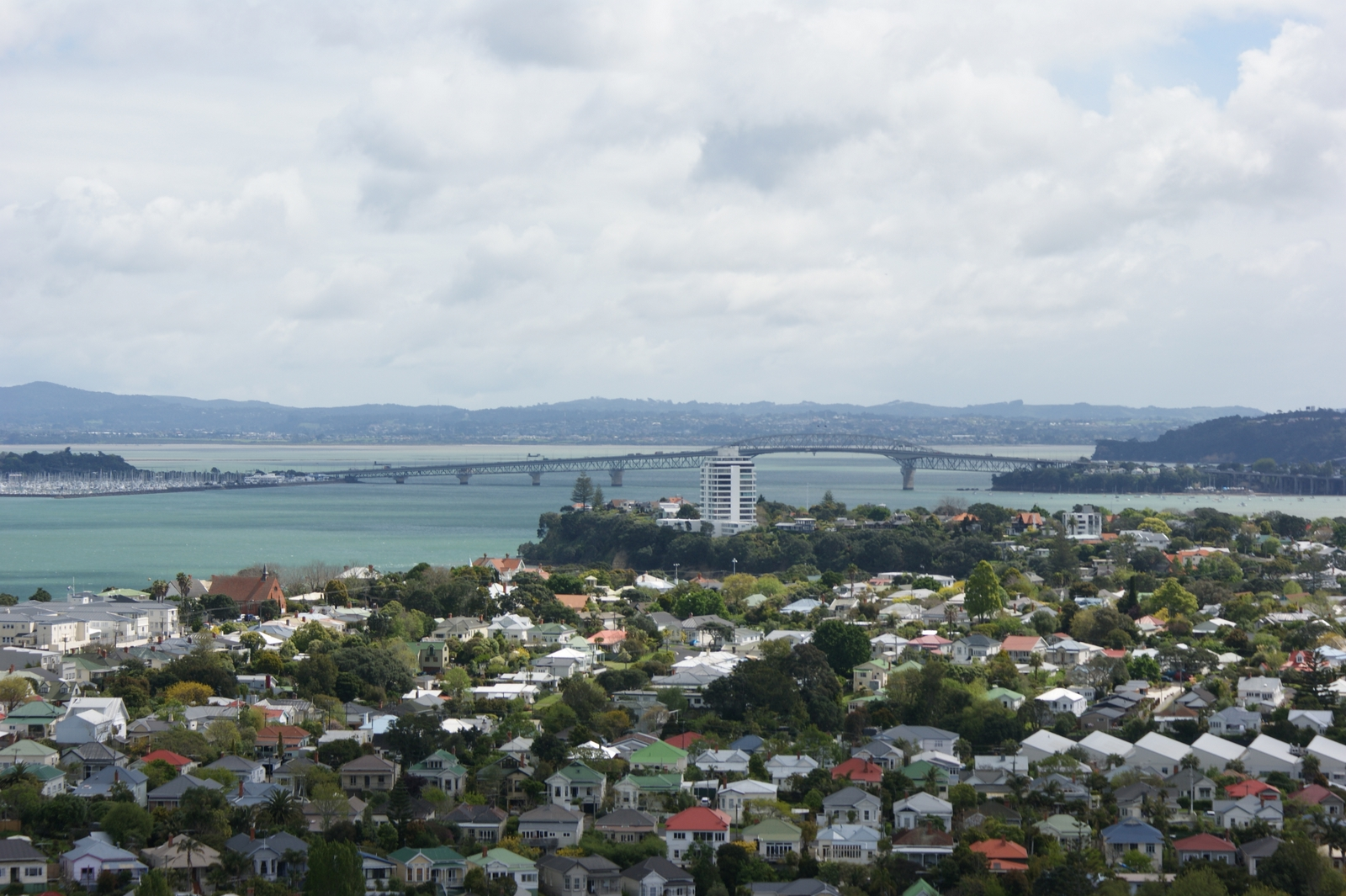
- Stanley Point, the westernmost part of Stanley Bay
- Interactive map of Stanley Point
- Coordinates: 36.827°S 174.789°E
- Country: New Zealand
- City: Auckland
- Local authority: Auckland Council
- Electoral ward: North Shore ward
- Local board: Devonport-Takapuna Local Board

Area
  - Land: 99 ha (240 acres)

Population (June 2025)
  - Total: 1,970
  - Density: 2,000/km^{2} (5,200/sq mi)
- Postcode: 0624

(Shoal Bay)	(Ngataringa Bay)	(Ngataringa Bay)
(Waitematā Harbour)	Stanley Point	Devonport
(Waitematā Harbour)	(Waitematā Harbour)	(Waitematā Harbour)

Stanley Point (previously Stanley Bay) is a small suburb located on the North Shore of Auckland, New Zealand, near Devonport, another suburb. It is mostly residential. The Devonport Naval Base lies to the east of the bay on the south side of the Stanley Bay peninsula and is connected to storage facilities on the north side at Ngataringa Bay by a tunnel.

== Name ==
The suburb was known as Stanley Bay until December 2007 when The New Zealand Geographic Board (Ngā Pou Taunaha o Aotearoa) officially named the suburb as Stanley Point.

The area is named after Owen Stanley, captain of HMS Britomart (1808), who conducted a survey of the Waitematā Harbour in 1841. During the construction of the Calliope Dock in the 1880s, Stanley Bay was home to a Māori village for the labourers who worked on the dock construction.

== Demographics ==
Stanley Point covers 0.99 km^{2} (0.38 sq mi) and had an estimated population of 1,970 as of June 2025, with a population density of 1,990 people per km^{2}.

Historical population
Year	Pop.	±% p.a.
2006	2,028	—
2013	2,040	+0.08%
2018	2,025	−0.15%
2023	1,977	−0.48%

Stanley Point had a population of 1,977 in the 2023 New Zealand census, a decrease of 48 people (−2.4%) since the 2018 census, and a decrease of 63 people (−3.1%) since the 2013 census. There were 1,032 males, 939 females and 3 people of other genders in 624 dwellings. 3.6% of people identified as LGBTIQ+. The median age was 39.1 years (compared with 38.1 years nationally). There were 342 people (17.3%) aged under 15 years, 501 (25.3%) aged 15 to 29, 867 (43.9%) aged 30 to 64, and 264 (13.4%) aged 65 or older.

People could identify as more than one ethnicity. The results were 89.2% European (Pākehā); 9.4% Māori; 3.5% Pasifika; 5.9% Asian; 1.5% Middle Eastern, Latin American and African New Zealanders (MELAA); and 2.0% other, which includes people giving their ethnicity as "New Zealander". English was spoken by 98.0%, Māori language by 1.8%, Samoan by 0.3%, and other languages by 13.1%. No language could be spoken by 1.1% (e.g. too young to talk). New Zealand Sign Language was known by 0.5%. The percentage of people born overseas was 31.6, compared with 28.8% nationally.

Religious affiliations were 24.1% Christian, 0.5% Hindu, 0.2% Islam, 0.6% Māori religious beliefs, 0.6% Buddhist, and 1.4% other religions. People who answered that they had no religion were 66.8%, and 5.8% of people did not answer the census question.

Of those at least 15 years old, 744 (45.5%) people had a bachelor's or higher degree, 723 (44.2%) had a post-high school certificate or diploma, and 162 (9.9%) people exclusively held high school qualifications. The median income was $58,700, compared with $41,500 nationally. 486 people (29.7%) earned over $100,000 compared to 12.1% nationally. The employment status of those at least 15 was that 999 (61.1%) people were employed full-time, 210 (12.8%) were part-time, and 21 (1.3%) were unemployed.

== Education ==
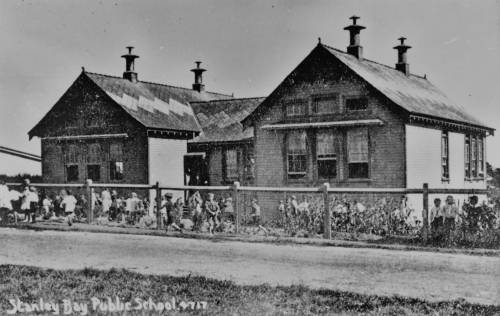
Stanley Bay School (state contributing school in Auckland, New Zealand)

Stanley Bay School is a coeducational contributing primary school (years 1–6), with a roll of 167 as of July 2026. The school motto is "Those Who Do Their Best Do Well". The school was founded in 1909
