= Bayswater, New Zealand =

Bayswater
- Suburb
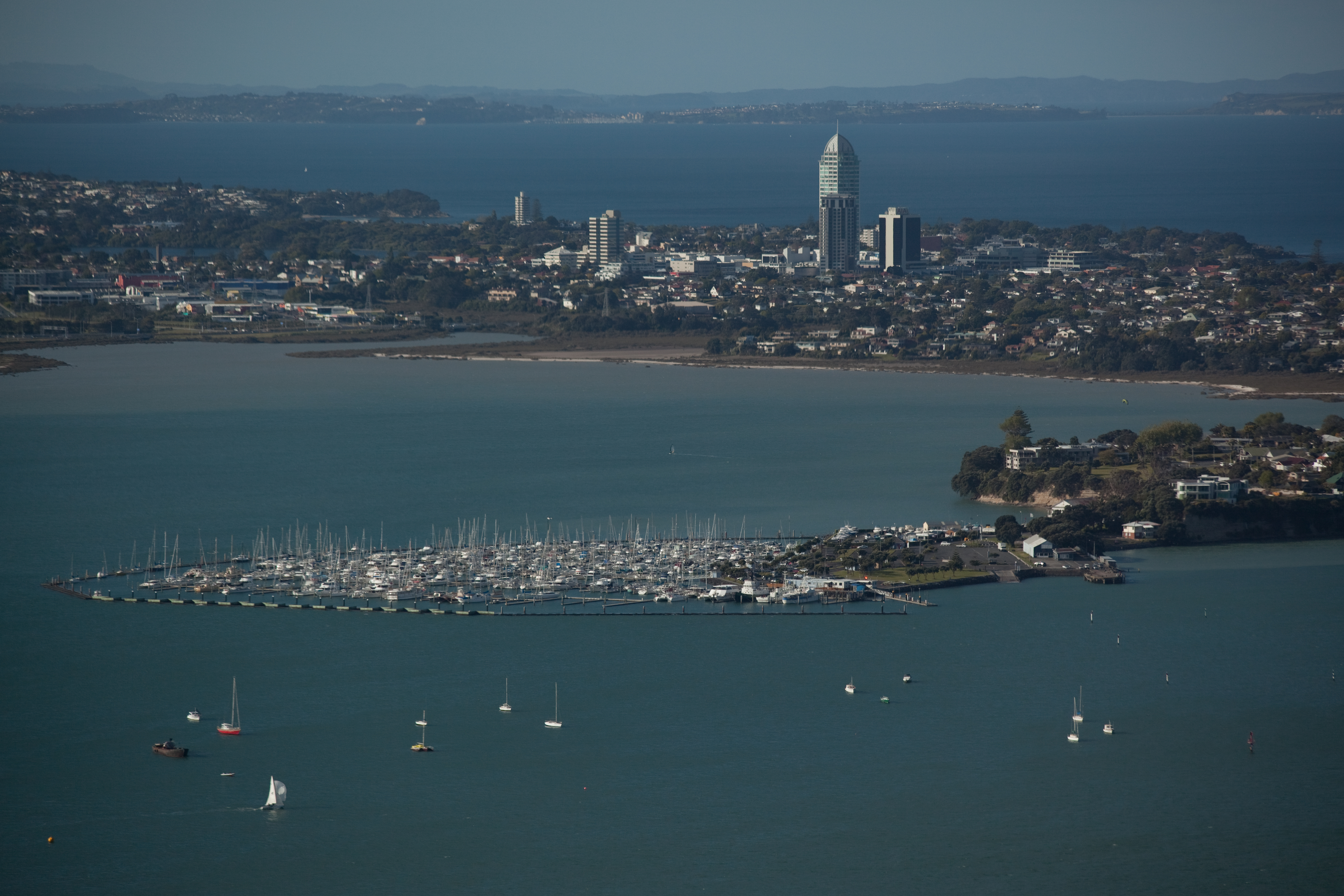
- Bayswater marina with Takapuna in the background
- Interactive map of Bayswater
- Coordinates: 36.815°S 174.773°E
- Country: New Zealand
- City: Auckland
- Local authority: Auckland Council
- Electoral ward: North Shore ward
- Local board: Devonport-Takapuna Local Board
- Established: 1844

Area
  - Land: 110 ha (270 acres)

Population (June 2025)
  - Total: 2,840
  - Density: 2,600/km^{2} (6,700/sq mi)
- Postcode: 0622
- Ferry terminals: Bayswater Marina

(Waitemata Harbour)	Hauraki
(Waitemata Harbour)	Bayswater	Belmont
	(Waitemata Harbour)	Narrow Neck

Bayswater is a coastal suburb located on the North Shore of Auckland, New Zealand, situated on a peninsula in the Waitematā Harbour. It lies approximately 3 kilometres south of Takapuna and is part of the Devonport-Takapuna Local Board and the North Shore ward of Auckland Council.

Originally known as O'Neill's Point, the area was subdivided for residential development in 1909 and later renamed Bayswater, likely after the London suburb of the same name. The suburb is characterised by its maritime setting, with ferry services connecting it to Auckland's central business district, and features several heritage sites including the O'Neill's Point Cemetery and the Takapuna Boating Club.

== Geography ==
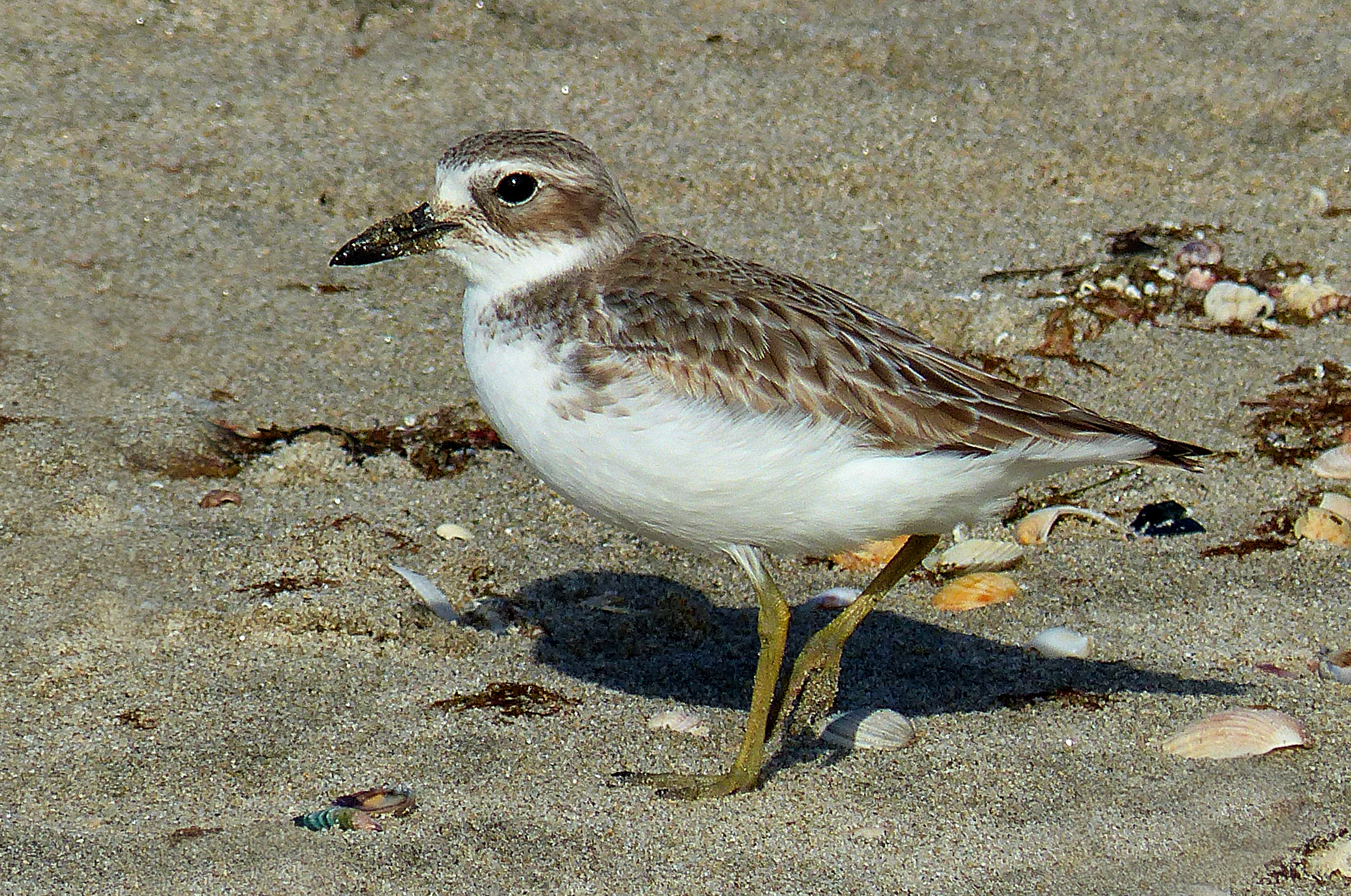
New Zealand Dotterel (Charadrius obscurus)

Bayswater is a peninsula on the southern North Shore of Auckland, surrounded by Shoal Bay to the north, Ngataringa Bay to the south, and the wider Waitematā Harbour to the southwest. Bayswater borders the suburb of Belmont to the east. The westernmost point of the peninsula is known as O'Neill's Point.

Shoal Bay is a Department of Conservation high priority site of special wildlife interest, SSWI, because of its significance for wading birds. Many shore birds graze in this significant estuary. Every year, the bar-tailed godwit migrates from Alaska to New Zealand. About 200 come to the Shoal Bay estuary in March to feed, relax, and then return. Shoal Bay is also home to the New Zealand Dotterel, which builds its nests above high tide and descends to the estuary at low tide to forage.

== History ==
The wider North Shore region has been populated by Māori since the 13th or 14th centuries and Māori have continuously lived in the area since. Areas around Bayswater have key significances to different iwi (e.g. Lake Pupuke, Te Puna Spring and Maungauika), but no stories link specifically to this peninsula. There is archaeological evidence of early Māori in the area, with several shell midden sites along the coast, but the land in this area was not considered fertile enough for farmland and so has little evidence of extended Māori settlement.

The land that would become Bayswater was included in the Mahurangi Block acquired by the Crown from Ngāti Pāoa in 1839. In 1844, that land was sectioned into farm plots. The farm plots along Bayswater were originally purchased by Holmes and Pettit, James O'Neill, Robert Hunt and H. Atkins. who primarily used it to harvest kauri gum deposits, which was common in the soil due to ancient kauri forests. The land itself was not suitable for British farming practices either as it constituted mostly of pipe-clay.

From about 1848, the land was simply referred to as O'Neill's Point or Allan O'Neill's Point. The name Bayswater was given to the peninsula in 1909, when the land was subdivided into residential plots and subsequently sold as the newest waterfront property. The area was divided up into 189 lots along Marine Terrace, Landsdowne St, Balfour St, Beresford St, King Edward's Avenue (now Bayswater Ave) and Norwood Road. This coincided with the founding of the Takapuna Tramway and Ferry Company who ran a ferry from Auckland city to Bayswater wharf and a tram from Bayswater wharf to Takapuna. The first ferry service ran on 10 December 1910. This led to the rapid population of the areas north of Devonport, including Bayswater, Belmont and Takapuna. The tramway lasted for only 18 years, closing for business in 1927, but the Bayswater ferry continues to this day. From the 1900s, the majority of the land in Bayswater was used for farming, supplying milk to the Takapuna Dairy Company, but continual residential subdivisions reduced the amount of farmland through the late 1920s and 30's.

The population of Bayswater only continued to increase, becoming more and more residential and consequently less farmland. In 1935, the eastern Bayswater area was converted into state housing, which included Bardia Street, Philomel Crescent, Diomede Street, Leander Road, Roberts Ave and Plymouth Crescent. These streets followed a much more integrated development, with cul-de-sacs and crescents which were well linked to coastal reserves by pedestrian walkways. Navy houses were built in this eastern area after World War II on Philomel Crescent, Portsmouth Road, Plymouth Crescent and Roberts Ave. By 1950, there was no more farmland on the Bayswater peninsula and the entire suburb was residential housing. The population in Bayswater only increased with the construction of the Harbour Bridge in 1959.

=== O'Neill's Point Cemetery ===
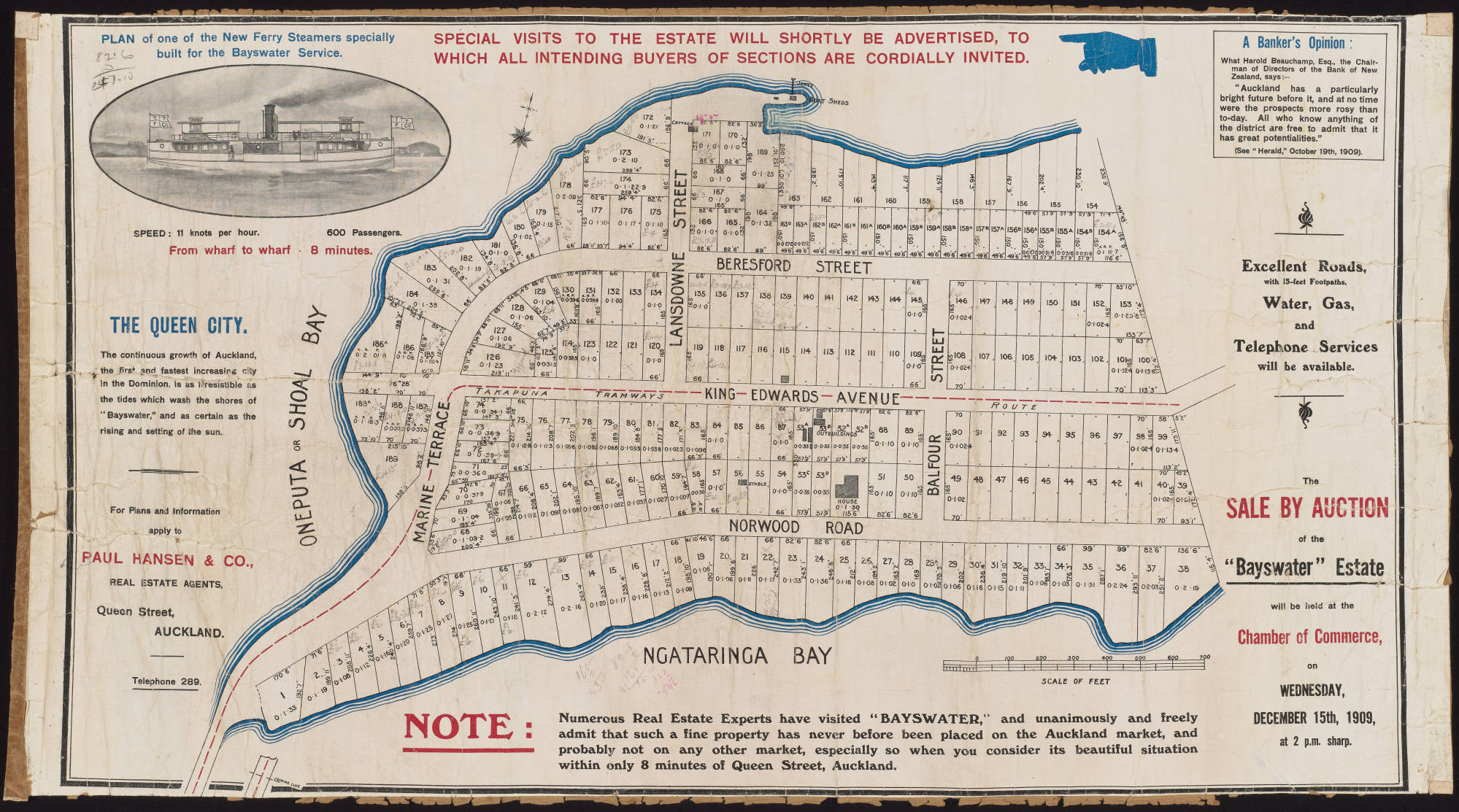

O'Neill's Point Cemetery is located at 122 Bayswater Avenue. It was opened in 1891 and named after James F. O'Neill. The cemetery contains the official war graves of 41 men who served in the New Zealand forces, as well as one man who served with the UK forces during World War I and who died before September 1, 1921. Several World War I graves (returned soldiers and soldiers who died of the flu and other causes at the nearby Narrow Neck army camp) can be found here.

=== Takapuna Boating Club ===
The Takapuna Boating Club was established in Bayswater in 1914 at O'Neill's Point. The old Panmure tannery building was shipped across the harbour in pieces to be reconstructed as their clubhouse in 1923. It was used in the 1960s before the club relocated to a new clubhouse on Takapuna Beach. Since then, the building has fallen into disrepair despite its heritage listing status.

=== St Michael's and All Angels Church ===
What would become St Michael's Church was built and dedicated in 1865 where the Holy Trinity Church now stands on Church Street in Devonport, as part of the Sunday school building. In 1924, the church was moved to Bayswater when the Parish of Devonport was split in two due to rising population. This first St. Michael's church was destroyed by fire in 1908 and was rebuilt in 1910, and renamed St Michael's and All Angels Church.

In 2011 the church was deconsecrated and in 2013 it was repurposed as a martial arts studio.

=== Takapuna Tramways and Ferry Company Ltd ===
Takapuna Tramways and Ferry Company was established by a collective of entrepreneurs in 1909, in tandem with the creation of the Bayswater estate. Their directors included Paul M Hansen, Henry Hopper Adams, Captain James Smith, John Brown, Alexander R. Morrison, Edwin Mitchelson, Henry Brett, William J Geddis and William Blomfield. The allure of the Bayswater suburb was partly because of this ferry and tram service, which provided an eight-minute ferry to Auckland city and access by tram to Lake Pupuke and Takapuna. These services began 22 December 1910. The tram track ran from the Bayswater marina and down King Edward Road (now Bayswater Ave), down Lake Road and to Hall's Corner (the meeting point between Lake and Hurstmere Roads), then circled around Lake Pupuke before heading back towards Bayswater. The trip one-way took about 30 minutes. However, it faced constant competition for control over land transport in the North Shore and never turned a profit, and the ferry operation was bought by Devonport Ferry Company while the tramway ceased operations on 26 April 1927.

=== Gallery ===
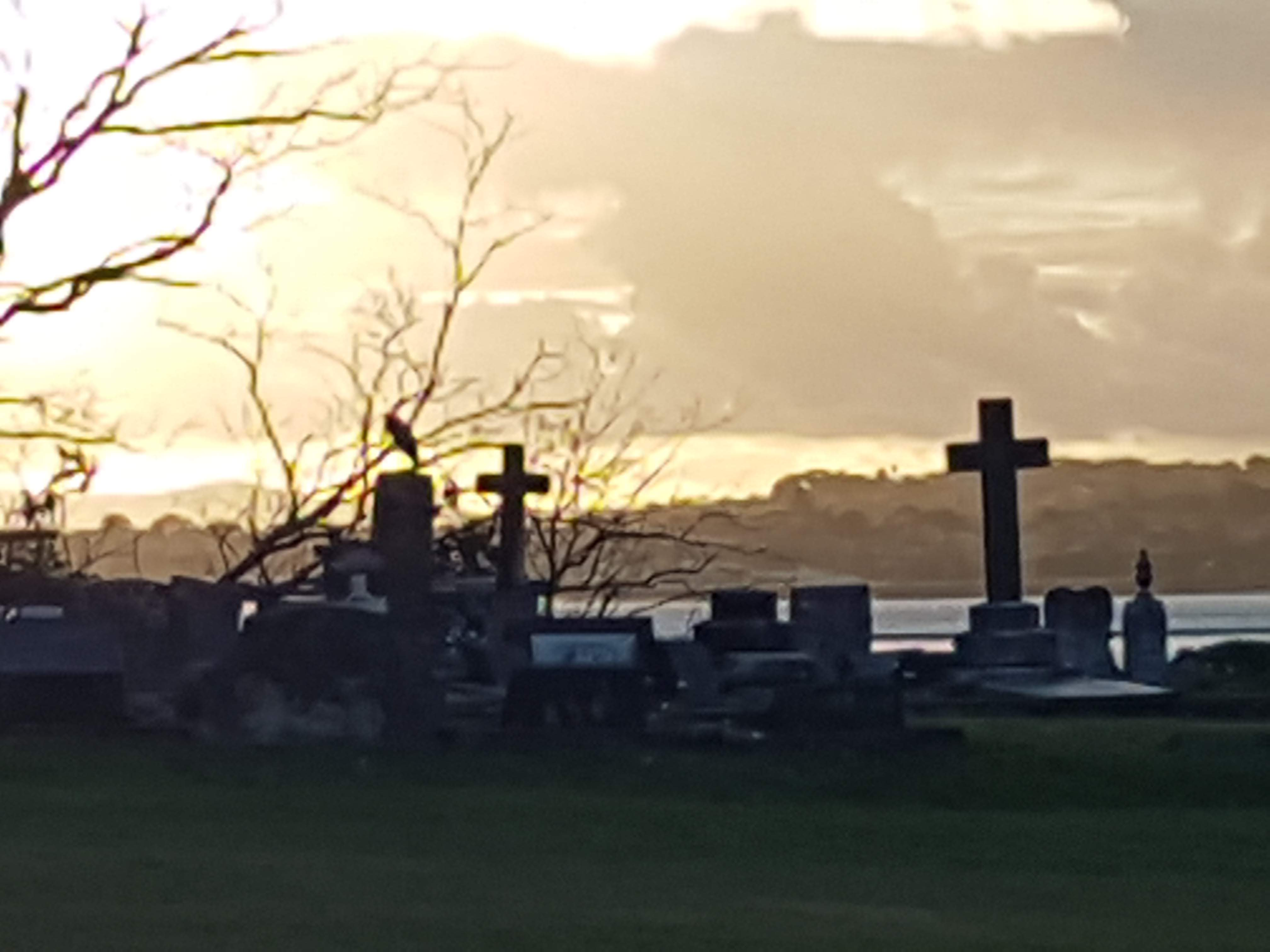
View of O'Neill's Point Cemetery towards Shoal Bay

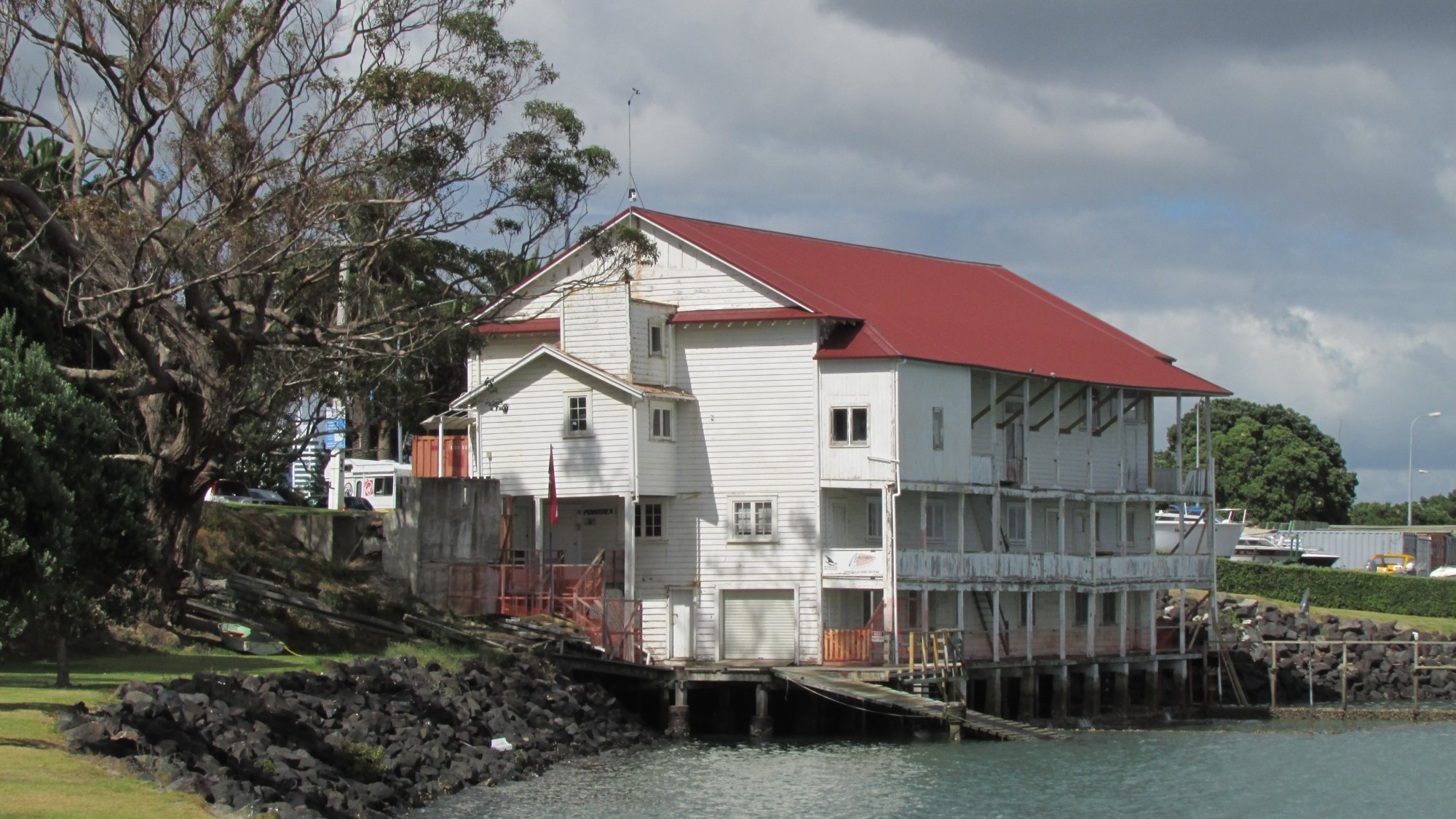
Takapuna Boating Club

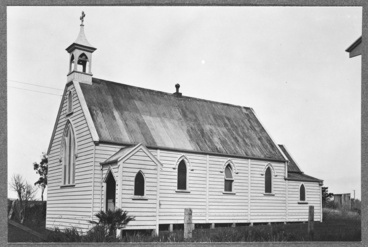
St. Michael's and All Angels Anglican Church, Bayswater

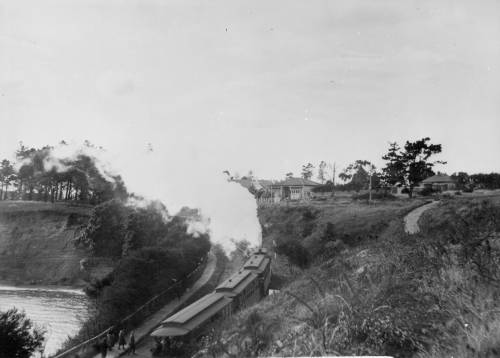
Image of Steam Tram leaving Bayswater Wharf

== Demographics ==
Bayswater covers 1.10 km^{2} (0.42 sq mi) and had an estimated population of 2,840 as of June 2025, with a population density of 2,582 people per km^{2}.

Historical population
Year	Pop.	±% p.a.
2006	2,643	—
2013	2,823	+0.95%
2018	2,865	+0.30%
2023	2,742	−0.87%

Bayswater had a population of 2,742 in the 2023 New Zealand census, a decrease of 123 people (−4.3%) since the 2018 census, and a decrease of 81 people (−2.9%) since the 2013 census. There were 1,350 males, 1,380 females and 12 people of other genders in 1,059 dwellings. 4.2% of people identified as LGBTIQ+. The median age was 39.7 years (compared with 38.1 years nationally). There were 522 people (19.0%) aged under 15 years, 600 (21.9%) aged 15 to 29, 1,200 (43.8%) aged 30 to 64, and 423 (15.4%) aged 65 or older.

People could identify as more than one ethnicity. The results were 81.3% European (Pākehā); 11.8% Māori; 5.8% Pasifika; 10.6% Asian; 2.8% Middle Eastern, Latin American and African New Zealanders (MELAA); and 2.6% other, which includes people giving their ethnicity as "New Zealander". English was spoken by 96.6%, Māori language by 1.8%, Samoan by 1.0%, and other languages by 17.0%. No language could be spoken by 1.9% (e.g. too young to talk). New Zealand Sign Language was known by 0.3%. The percentage of people born overseas was 32.3, compared with 28.8% nationally.

Religious affiliations were 26.5% Christian, 0.8% Hindu, 0.8% Islam, 0.2% Māori religious beliefs, 0.9% Buddhist, 0.3% New Age, 0.5% Jewish, and 0.9% other religions. People who answered that they had no religion were 63.0%, and 6.1% of people did not answer the census question.

Of those at least 15 years old, 852 (38.4%) people had a bachelor's or higher degree, 1,020 (45.9%) had a post-high school certificate or diploma, and 354 (15.9%) people exclusively held high school qualifications. The median income was $53,500, compared with $41,500 nationally. 525 people (23.6%) earned over $100,000 compared to 12.1% nationally. The employment status of those at least 15 was that 1,173 (52.8%) people were employed full-time, 330 (14.9%) were part-time, and 51 (2.3%) were unemployed.

== Education ==
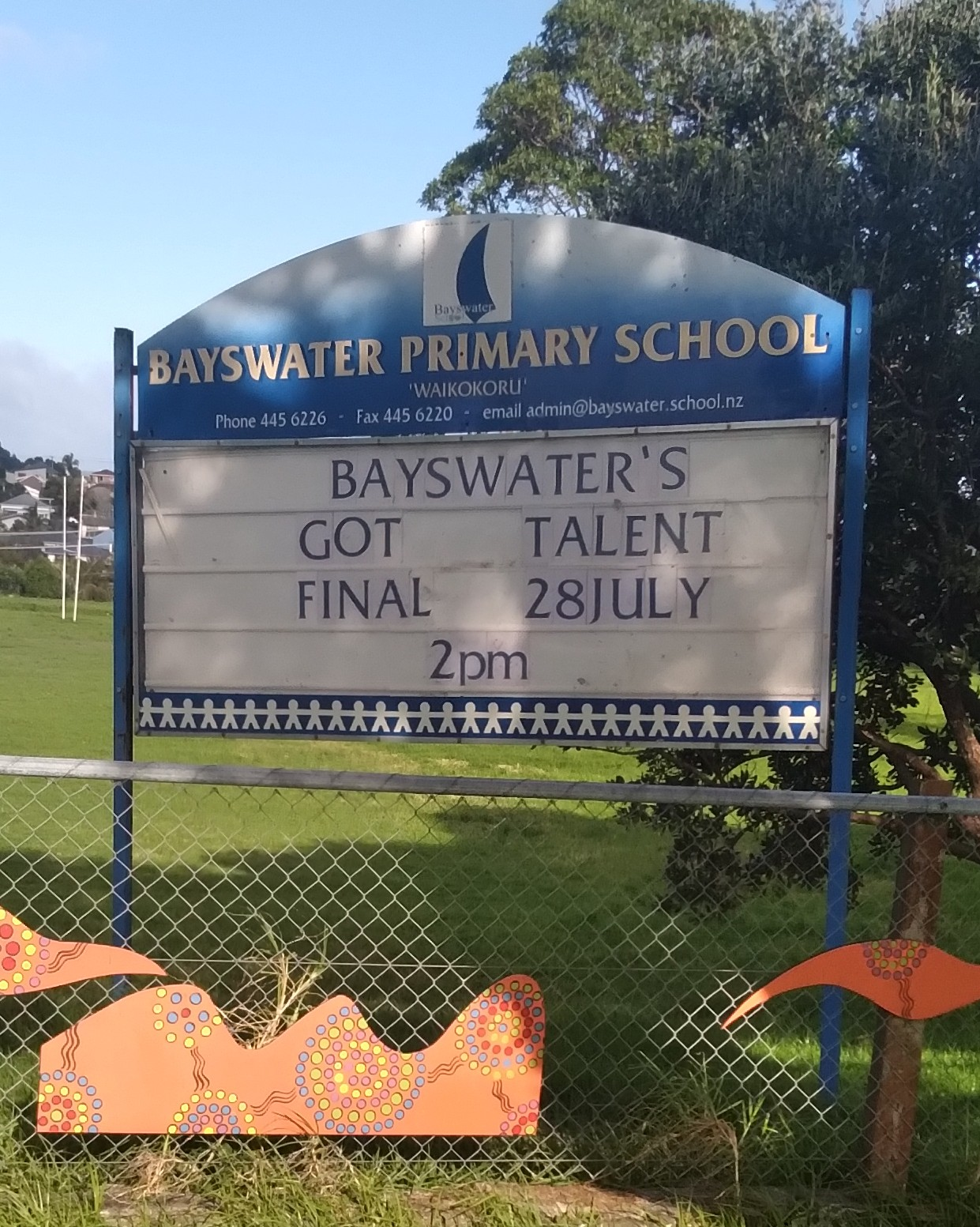
Bayswater School, New Zealand

Bayswater School is a coeducational contributing primary (years 1–6) school with a roll of 116 as of July 2026. The school celebrated its 50th Jubilee in 2003. Yachtsman Sir Peter Blake was an alumnus of the school.

== Sport ==
=== Bayswater Park ===
Bayswater Park is a public park in Bayswater, opposite to O'Neill's Point Cemetery. It is about 6.3 acres in size. It borders Bayswater Ave to the north, Rosyth Ave to the east and Roberts Ave to the south. The park contains two full-sized football fields, a clubroom, exercise machines and a playground. It contains a gravel walkway on its western side that allows walking access from Bayswater Ave to Roberts Ave. Bayswater Park and Stanley Bay Park are the home fields of North Shore United AFC.

This park has been in use for associated football teams since 1913 when it was acquired by the Auckland Football Association, predating its actual title as a park, being referred to simply as the Bayswater grounds.

=== Quinton Park ===
Quinton Park is a public park in Bayswater. It is 1 acre in size, bordered by Sir Peter Blake Parade to the east and a cliff face overlooking Shoal Bay to the west. It contains a walkway that leads to a viewpoint of Bayswater Marina, and Auckland CBD skyline and a pétanque court. There is a large section of native trees on the cliff and cliff face. This forest was expanded in 2023 by Restoring Takarunga Hauraki restoration project.

Quinton Park was gifted to the Devonport Borough Council in 1929 by Marianne Caughey Smith, founder of the Smith & Caughey's department store, and is named after the birthplace of her grandmother in Ireland.

- Belmont Park Racquets Club. Established in 1935 the club provides tennis and squash courts.
- Belmont Park Bowling Club crown green bowling.
- Takapuna Grammar School Rowing Club have their boathouse at Bayswater Marina.

== Local government ==
The first local government in the area was the Lake Highway District, also known as the Takapuna Highway District, which began operating 1867. In June 1889 the road board was dissolved, in favour of Takapuna being under the direct control of the Waitemata County Council. The Borough of Takapuna, which included Bayswater, was established on 1 July 1913, after 73% of electors in Takapuna voted for independence from the Waitemata County.

After significant growth in population, Takapuna Borough became Takapuna City in 1961. In 1989, Takapuna City was merged into the North Shore City. North Shore City was amalgamated into Auckland Council in November 2010.

Within the Auckland Council, Bayswater is a part of the Devonport-Takapuna local government area governed by the Devonport-Takapuna Local Board. It is a part of the North Shore ward, which elects two councillors to the Auckland Council.
