= Shoal Bay, New Zealand =

Bay in the Waitematā Harbour

Shoal Bay
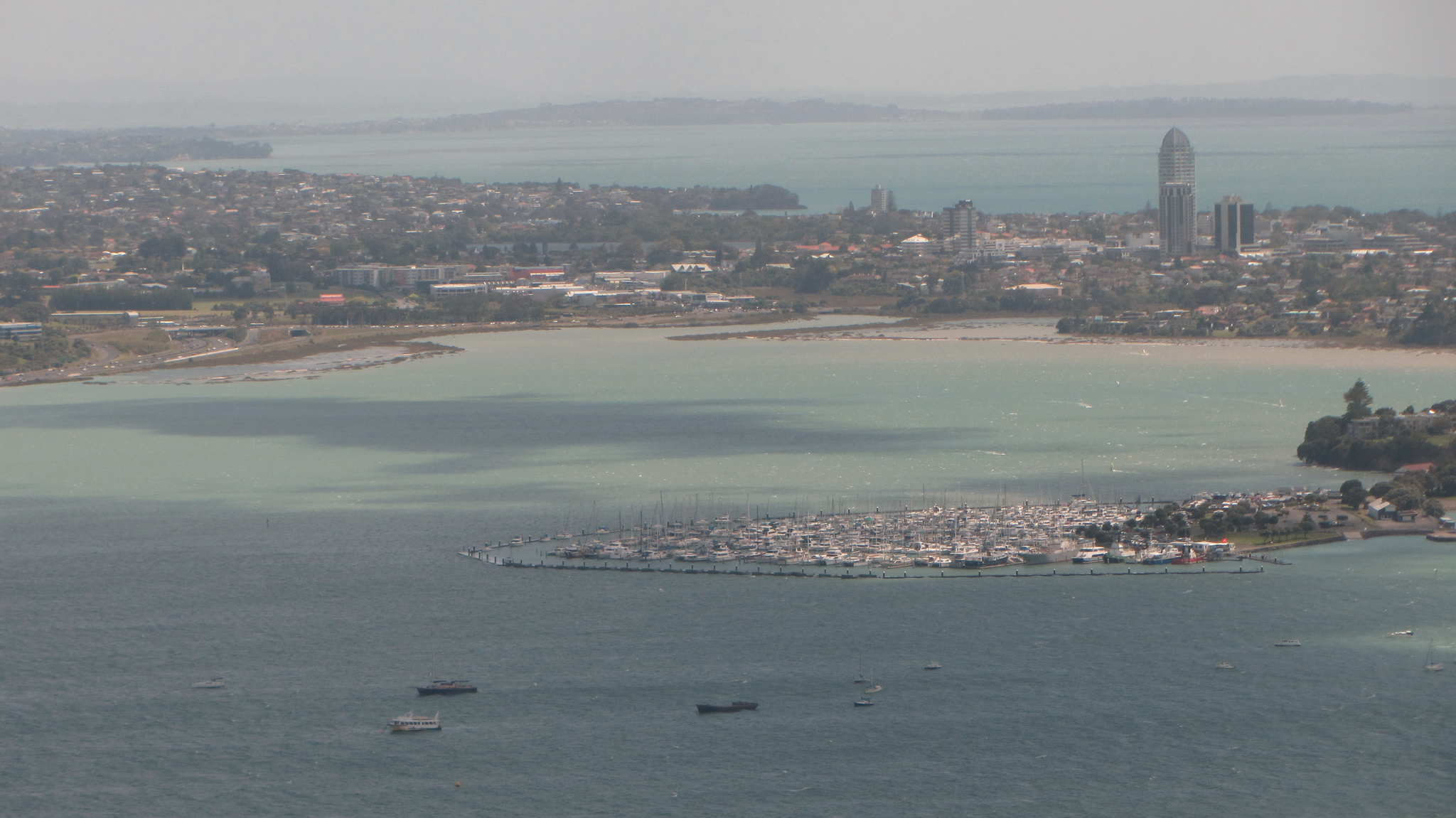
- View of Shoal Bay from the Sky Tower

- Location within the Auckland Region
- Location: Auckland Region, New Zealand
- Coordinates: 36.81°S 174.77°E
- River sources: Hillcrest Creek, Onepoto Stream
- Ocean/sea sources: Pacific Ocean
- Settlements: Bayswater, Hauraki, Northcote, Takapuna

Shoal Bay (Māori: Oneoneroa) is an inlet of the Waitematā Harbour on Auckland’s North Shore. Forming the coastal margin between Northcote and Takapuna, the bay is a drowned river valley shaped by late‑Pleistocene flooding and later volcanic activity, including the formation of the Tuff Crater and Onepoto volcanic features on its western edge. Several streams, including the Onepoto Stream and Hillcrest Creek, flow into the bay.

The bay has evidence of Māori settlement, shellfish gathering, gardens. European settlement includes evidence of brickworks.

== Geography ==
Shoal Bay is located on the North Shore, separating Northcote from Takapuna. It is a drowned river valley that flooded during the last glacial period. Formerly the mouth of the Wairau Valley creek, the creek changed course to Milford after Lake Pupuke erupted, approximately 140,000 years ago.

There are two volcanic craters found on the western shores of Shoal Bay: Tank Farm, also known as Tuff Crater or Te Kōpua ō Matakamokamo, joined to the south by Onepoto (also known as Te Kōpua ō Matakerepo). Onepoto and Tank Farm erupted an estimated 187,600 and 181,000 years ago respectively.

Two streams flow into Shoal Bay. The Onepoto Stream flows east through Birkenhead and Northcote, entering Shoal Bay south of Onewa Road. Hillcrest Creek flows east through Hillcrest and Northcote, entering the Waitematā Harbour at Shoal Bay, east of the Auckland Northern Motorway. A traditional recorded name for Hillcrest Creek is Wakatatere "The Drifting Canoe", a name which recalls an incident where a tapu waka drifted into the stream at high tide. A tributary of Hillcrest Stream, Awataha Stream, flowed through Northcote Central until the 1950s, when the stream was undergrounded. In 2019, work began to daylight the stream.

Two beaches were formerly located along the western shores of Shoal Bay: the City of Cork Beach and Sulphur Beach. These locations were reclaimed in the 1950s, and are now located beneath the Auckland Northern Motorway.

Barrys Point is a headland south of Esmonde Road that extends into Shoal Bay, between Northcote and Takapuna.

== History ==
The traditional Tāmaki Māori name for Shoal Bay is Oneoneroa, meaning "Long Sands"; a name which also referred to Sulphur Beach. The upper reaches of Shoal bay were called Waipaoraora, referring to how the spring tides did not fully cover the shallow parts of the estuary.

Māori settlement of the Auckland Region began around the 13th or 14th centuries. The Tainui migratory canoe visited Northcote, stopping at Ngā Huru-a-Taiki, a sacred tree on the cliffs south-east of Tank Farm. The Shoal Bay area was used to harvest shellfish, and the volcanic soil at Northcote allowed for kūmara cultivation. Te Onewa Pā was constructed at the Northcote headland at the mouth of Shoal Bay, was prized for its strategic location and view over the Waitematā Harbour, and protected fisheries and kūmara gardens of the nearby volcanic soil.

A portage at Takapuna allowed for waka to pass overland between Shoal Bay and St Leonards Bay in the Hauraki Gulf.

From the 1840s, European settlers established sawmills at Shoal Bay, primarily focusing on logging the pūriri forests of the southern North Shore. In the same period, settlers developed brickworks along the shores of Shoal Bay, the earliest being at Stanley Bay Beach. This was followed by Phillip Callan's brickyard at Sulphur Beach in 1843. From 1848, a soap and candle factory was established on Sulphur Beach, and other early industries included timber milling and kauri gum digging. In 1878, Auckland Chemical Works was established at Northcote, on the beach next to the brickworks. The factory processed sulphur from Moutohora Island in the Bay of Plenty, but was unprofitable, as the amount of sulphur estimated to be on the island was overestimated.

By the late 19th and early 20th centuries, Sulphur Beach had become a popular spot for tourists and picnickers. In the 1910s, boat building yards were established at Shoal Bay. From 1913 the bay was used to anchor coal hulks and laid-up ships. In the 1930s there was concern about the number of anchored ships.

In 1959, the Auckland Harbour Bridge and Auckland Northern Motorway were opened in Auckland, crossing the Waitematā Harbour. The motorway was constructed on reclaimed land along the western shore of Shoal Bay, leading to the destruction of Sulphur Beach and City of Cork Beach. During the 1960s, the Onepoto Basin, formerly open to the harbour, was drained and redeveloped into recreational facilities.

== Environment ==
To the north of Bayswater, Shoal Bay is a DoC high priority site of special wildlife interest, SSWI, because of its significance for wading birds. Many shore birds graze in this significant estuary. Every year, the bar-tailed godwit migrates from Alaska to New Zealand. About 200 come to the Shoal Bay estuary in March to feed, relax, and then return.

Shoal Bay is also home to the New Zealand dotterel, which builds its nests above high tide and descends to the estuary at low tide to forage.

== Bibliography ==
- Christmas, Judith (1983), A History of Northcote, Northcote Borough Council, OCLC 154573998, Wikidata Q123591383
- Verran, David (2010), The North Shore: An Illustrated History, North Shore: Random House, OL 33434370W, Wikidata Q120520385
