= Onepoto =

Onepoto may refer to:

- Onepoto, Hawke's Bay, a small settlement near Lake Waikaremoana
- Onepoto, Wellington, a suburb of Porirua, New Zealand
- Onepoto (volcanic crater), a feature near Northcote in Auckland, New Zealand
- Onepoto Bridge, a bridge in Auckland, New Zealand
- Te Onepoto / Taylors Mistake is a beach and bach community on Banks Peninsula, New Zealand
