= Stothard =

Stothard is a surname. Notable people with the surname include:

- Anna Eliza Stothard (1790–1883), English historical novelist
- Anna Stothard (born 1983), British novelist, journalist and screenwriter
- Charles Alfred Stothard (1786–1821), English artist and antiquarian
- Edward Stothard (1893–1955), English footballer
- David Stothard (born 1937), Canadian soccer player
- Hamish Stothard (1913–1997), Scottish athlete
- John Russell Stothard (born 1970), British parasitologist
- Peter Stothard (born 1951), English newspaper editor
- Sarah Sophia Stothard (1825–1901), New Zealand teacher and educationalist
- Thomas Stothard (1755–1834), English artist and engraver
- Grant Stothard (born 1942), Magistrate for Chesterfield, local poet

== See also ==
- Stothert (disambiguation)
