= Abba-Rose Vaiaoga-Ioasa =

Samoan-New Zealand film producer

Abba-Rose Dinah Vaiaoga-Ioasa is a Samoan-New Zealand film producer.

== Biography ==
Vaiaoga-Ioasa was born in New Zealand to Samoan parents and grew up in the suburb of Northcote, Auckland. She attended Auckland Girls' Grammar School and went on to study at the University of Auckland, completing a bachelor degree in chemical and material engineering in 2012. She worked in chemical engineering in Canada until resigning to return to New Zealand and work with her brother Stallone Vaiaoga-Ioasa as associate producer for his 2016 film Three Wise Cousins.

In 2020, she was named the SPADA New Filmmaker of the Year. In the same year, she won a New Zealand Film Commission Gender Scholarship.

Vaiaoga-Ioasa and her brother co-founded the group Pacific Islands Screen Artists (PISA) in 2020 which "supports, encourages and promotes Pasifika working in the New Zealand Screen sector".

== Filmography ==
Year	Title	Format	Notes
2024	I Got You	Web series	
2020	Mama's Music Box	Feature film	
2019	Take Home Pay	Feature film	
2018	Hibiscus & Ruthless	Feature film	
2016	Three Wise Cousins	Feature film	
