= Tank farm =

Tank farm may refer to the:

- Alternate name for an oil terminal or oil depot, a facility for storage of liquid petroleum products or petrochemicals
- Tank Farm, also known as Tuff Crater, a volcanic crater in the Auckland Volcanic Field, New Zealand
- Western Reclamation, also known as the "Tank Farm", on the Waitemata Harbour in Auckland, New Zealand
