= Auckland Girls' Grammar School =

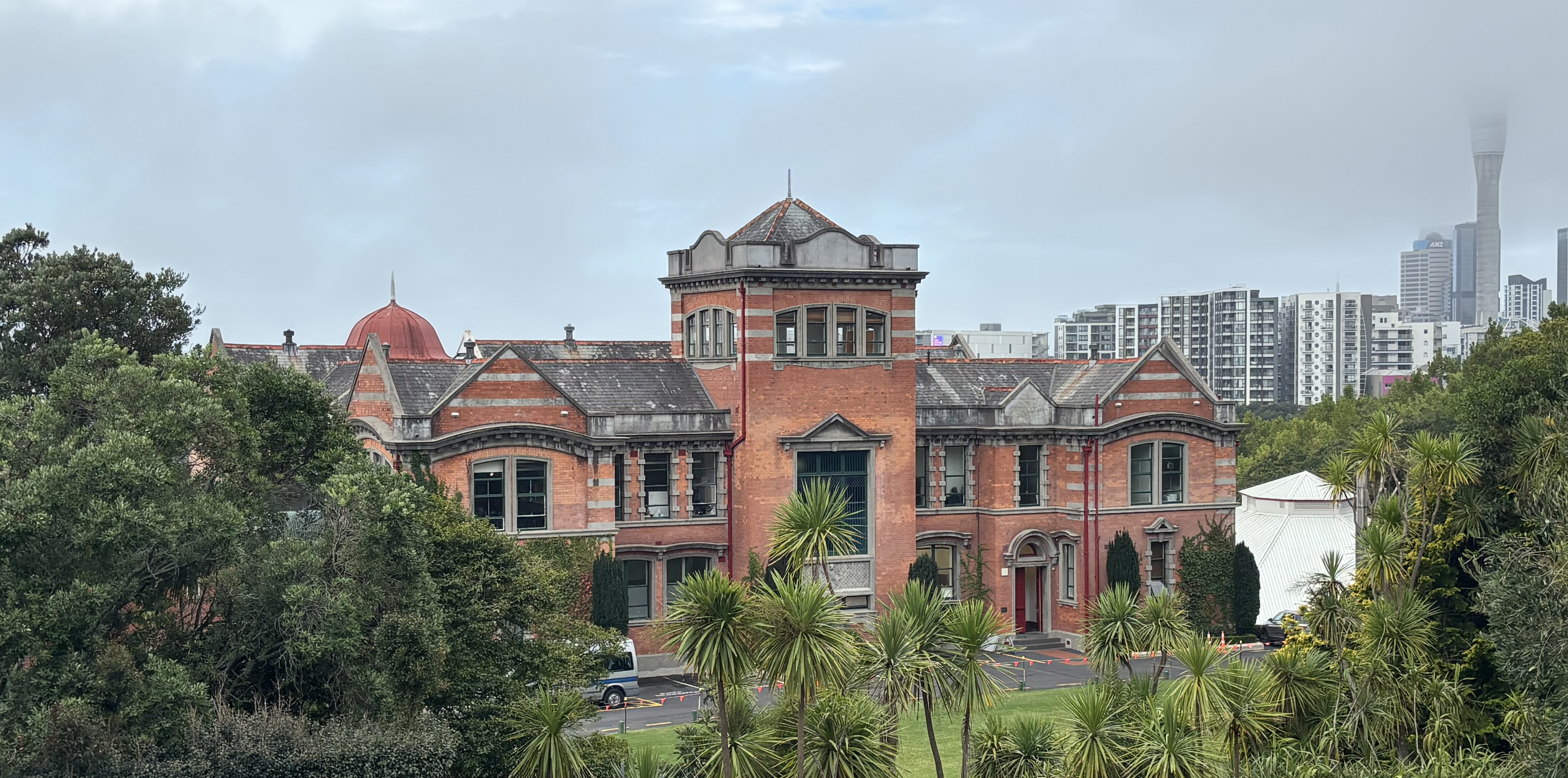
- The school seen from Hopetoun Street, looking north

Location
- Howe Street, Newton, Auckland; 36.8569°S 174.7537°E

Information
- Type: State single-sex girls' secondary school (Years 9–13)
- Motto: Latin: Per Angusta Ad Augusta "Through trials to triumph"
- Established: 1878
- Ministry of Education Institution no.: 53
- Principal: Ngaire Ashmore
- Enrolment: 1,191 (July 2026)
- Colours: gold, navy blue
- Socio-economic decile: 3H
- Website: aggs.school.nz

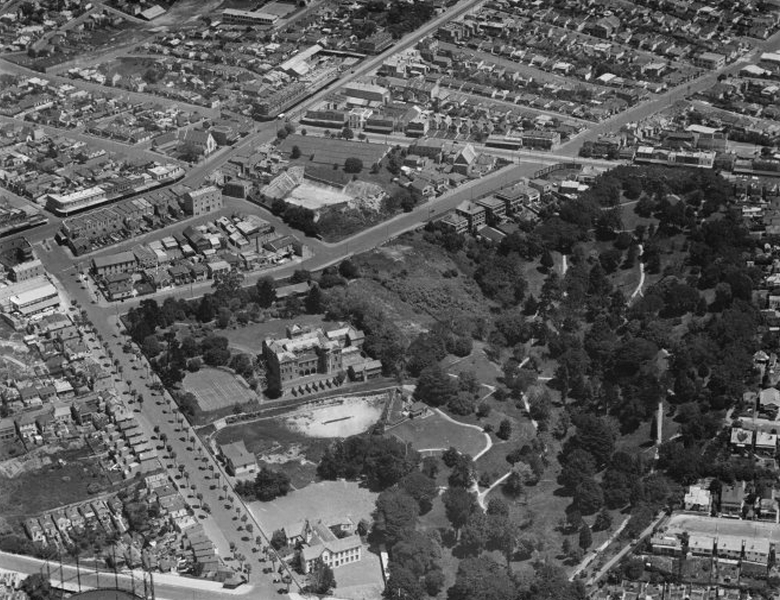
The school seen from the air in 1934

Auckland Girls' Grammar School (AGGS) is a New Zealand secondary school for girls located in Newton, Auckland. Established in 1878 as Auckland Girls' High School, it is one of the oldest secondary institutions in the country. The school closed its site temporarily in 1888 due to financial difficulties and classes for girls were held at Auckland Grammar School until the girls' school moved to new premises in Howe Street in 1909 and the name of the school changed to Auckland Girls' Grammar School. The school received the Goodman Fielder awards for School and Secondary School of the year in 2000.

The main block is listed as a Category 2 Historic Place.

== Enrolment ==
In 2018, Auckland Girls' Grammar School had 1,030 students enrolled and is 100% female. The number of international students was 22. As of July 2026, Auckland Girls' Grammar School has a roll of 1,191 students.

As of 2026, the school has an Equity Index of 485, placing it amongst schools whose students have above average socioeconomic barriers to achievement (roughly equivalent to deciles 4 and 5 under the former socio-economic decile system).

== Headmistresses ==
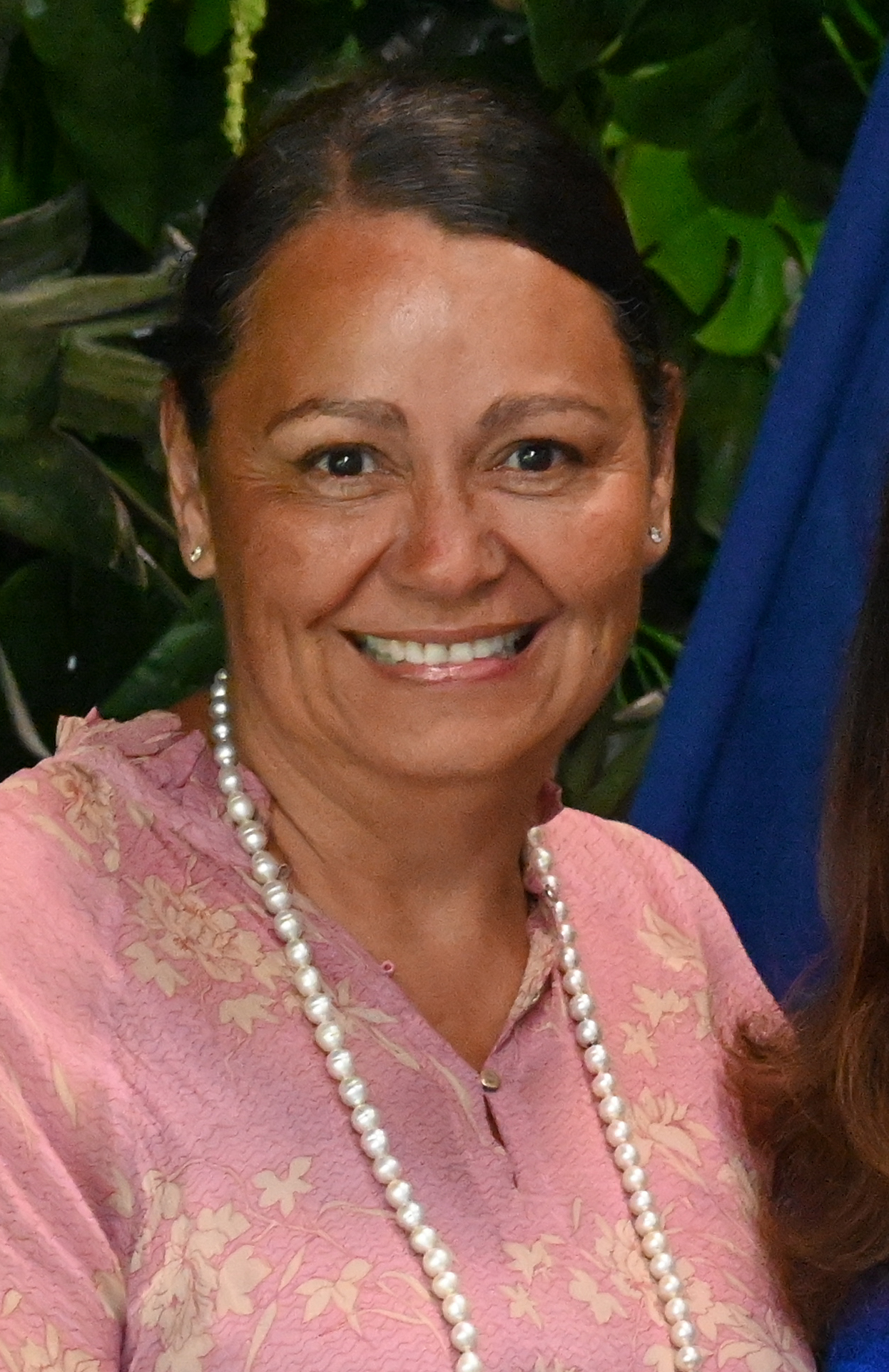
Ngaire Ashmore in 2022

- Sophia Stothard (died 1901): 1877–1878
- Annie Whitelaw (1875–1966): 1906–1910
- Blanche Butler (died 1967): 1911–1921
- Rua Gardner (1901–1972): 1944–1967
- Louise Gardner (ca. 1916–2006): 1967–1978
- Charmaine Pountney: 1978–1988
- Ngaire Ashmore (born ca. 1967): 2017–present

== Notable alumnae ==
- Frankie Adams – actress
- Kiri Allan – politician and Labour MP, Minister of Conservation, Minister for Emergency Management
- Zoë Bell – stuntwoman and actress
- Sue Bradford – politician, activist and former Green MP
- Dorothy Butler – author
- Barbara Calvert - professor of education
- Lana Coc-Kroft – NZ Miss Universe 1988, television presenter
- Sandra Coney – journalist and women's rights activist
- Kayla Cullen – athlete, Northern Mystics and NZ Silver Ferns
- Tiana Epati – President of the New Zealand Law Society
- Golriz Ghahraman – politician and former Green MP, former United Nations lawyer
- Parris Goebel – international choreographer
- Siositina Hakeai – athlete
- Hon. Laila Harré – union leader, politician, former Alliance MP and Minister of Women's Affairs, Minister of Youth Affairs, Minister of Statistics, Associate Minister of Labour and Commerce
- Emily Karaka – artist
- Doreen Lumley – athlete
- Rose Matafeo – comedian, television presenter
- Miriama McDowell – New Zealand actress, director and playwright
- Ani O'Neill – artist
- Merimeri Penfold – Māori educator
- Sheryl Scanlan – netball player
- Miriama Smith – actress
- Pauline Stansfield – disability rights advocate
- Marté Szirmay - artist
- Kahurangi Taylor – Miss New Zealand 2008
- Munokoa Tunupopo – athlete, Auckland and White Ferns
- Hon. Dame Georgina Manunui te Heuheu – politician, former National MP and Minister for Courts, Minister of Women's Affairs, Minister of Pacific Island Affairs, Minister for Disarmament and Arms Control, Associate Minister of Maori Affairs
- Katrina Rore – netballer
- Abba-Rose Vaiaoga-Ioasa - film producer
- Poto Williams – politician and Labour MP, Assistant Speaker of the New Zealand House of Representatives
- Tammy Wilson – Black Ferns
