= Onepoto Bridge =

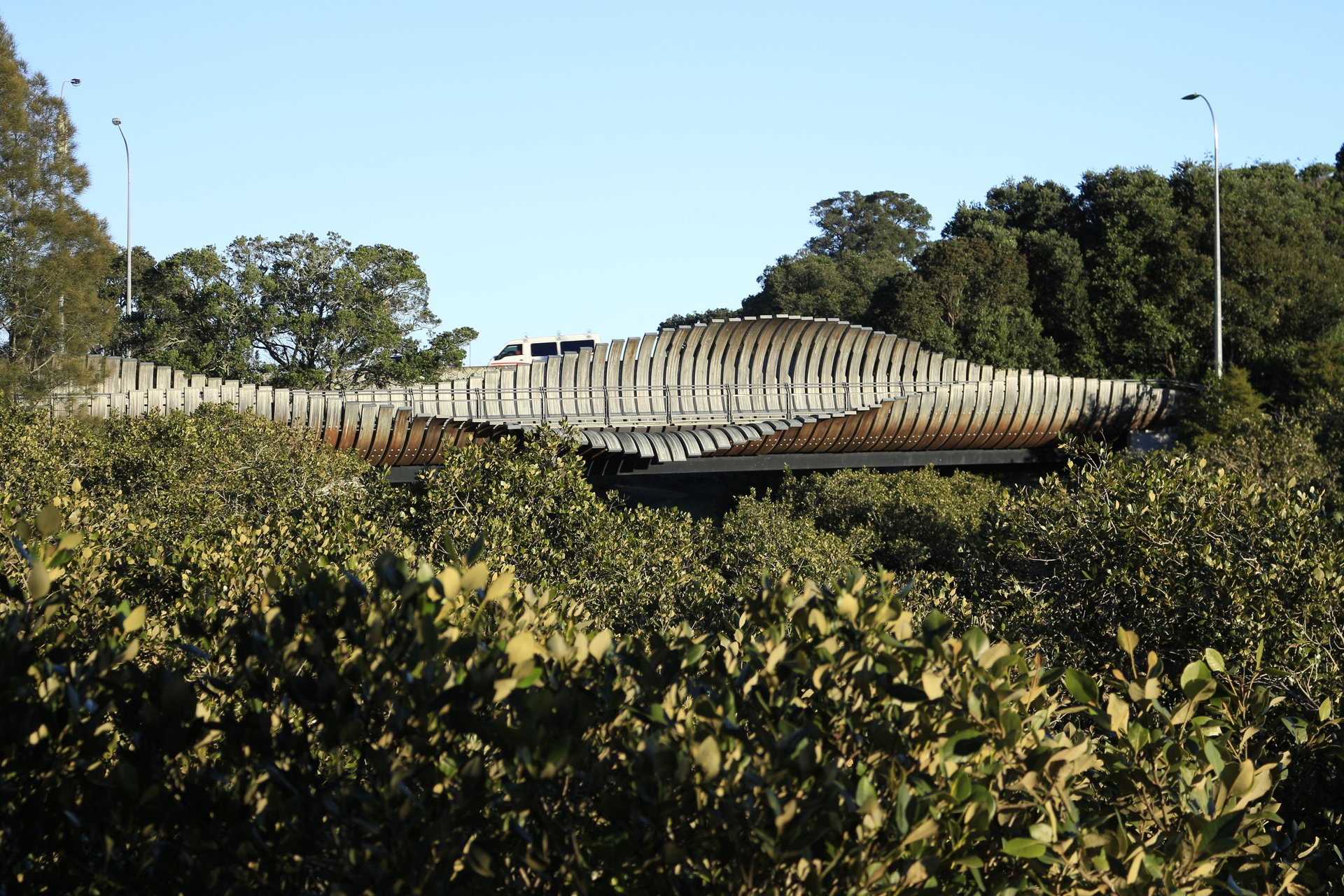
- View of Onepoto Bridge from the entrance to Onepoto Domain
- Coordinates: 36.8120°S 174.7500°E
- Carries: Pedestrians, cyclists
- Crosses: Onepoto volcanic crater tidal outlet
- Locale: Northcote

Characteristics
- Total length: 46 metres (151 ft)

History
- Designer: Beca Group
- Opened: 2008

Location
- Interactive map of Onepoto Bridge

Onepoto Bridge is a 46 m (151 ft) long pedestrian and cyclist bridge crossing the tidal stream outlet of the Onepoto volcanic crater in Northcote, Auckland.

The bridge became necessary after widening of Onewa Road towards State Highway 1 made the existing bridge too narrow to accommodate footpaths. After deciding to build a new bridge, North Shore City Council resolved to construct an iconic structure that would create "architecture integrated into the landscape". This led to the bridge being encased with wooden curved 'ribs' described as resembling a whale skeleton, a wave or a half-finished sailing ship. The bridge was designed by Beca Group.

The bridge is also part of North Shore City's strategic cycle route network and is incorporated into efforts to improve access to the local estuarial area for the community.
