= Stothert =

Stothert may refer to:

- Stothert’s & Sons Ltd, a former Chemists, Pharmaceuticals and Soft Drinks manufacturer
- James Stothert, former English footballer
- Jean Stothert, mayor-elect of Omaha, Nebraska, USA
- Stothert & Pitt, a former British engineering company

== See also ==
- Stothert, Slaughter & Co, locomotive manufacturer in Bristol, England between 1864 and 1934
- Stothert & Pitt RFC, a men's rugby union football club
- Stothard (surname page)
