= William Archer Price =

- Born: 1866
- Died: 24 January 1948 (aged 81); Auckland, New Zealand
- Occupation: Photographer

William Archer Price (1866 – 24 January 1948) was a photographer, possibly best known for the thousands of photographs he took of New Zealand.

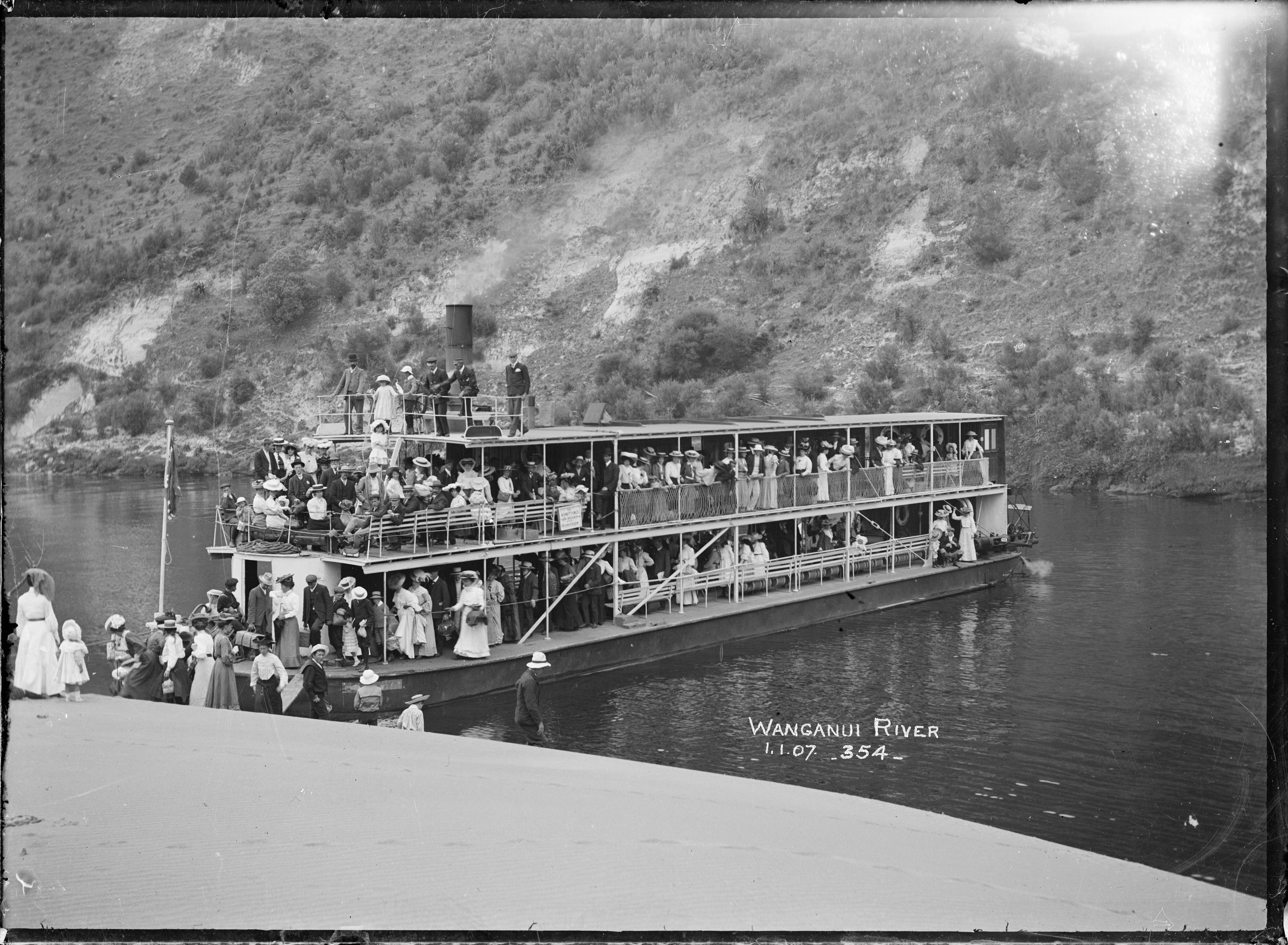
Paddle steamer Manuwai, and passengers, on the Whanganui River. Possibly this is one of the photographs which gained W. A. Price a mention in 1906

By 1906 he was being mentioned as a photographer, and about that time began publishing postcards. The early postcards were imprinted "The W.A.P. Colour Photographic Series, Wanganui Photo Co NZ", which became "Wanganui Photo Co, Northcote, Auckland, NZ" by 1908 and then "W.A. Price Photo Co". He was initially based in Whanganui, before moving to Queen Street, in Northcote about 1909. In 1911 he moved to 21 Masons Ave Ponsonby. From 1920 to 1923 he was in partnership with Alfred George Jasper, as Price Photo Co, though the name had been in use since at least 1909, when it was described as famous and was at Herne Bay in 1913 and at Ponsonby by 1917. They had a studio at 300 Ponsonby Road, where their developing room was gutted by fire in 1928, though it seems the name continued to be used for another couple of years.

A plaque at Purewa Cemetery records his death and also that of Edith Price, who died on 23 August 1966.
