= Northcote, Auckland =

Northcote
- Suburb
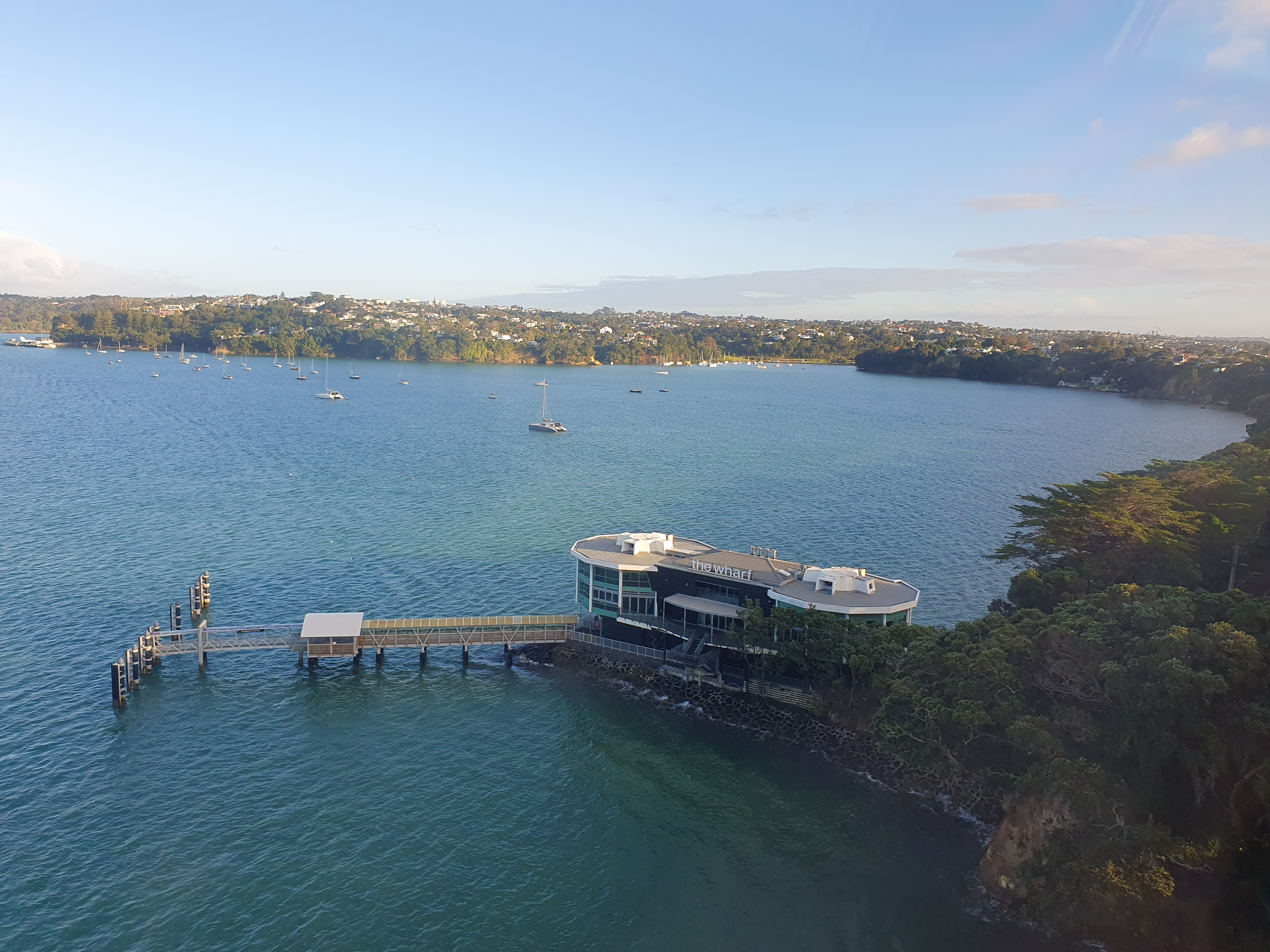
- Northcote Point Ferry Terminal, The Wharf events centre, and Little Shoal Bay
- Interactive map of Northcote
- Coordinates: 36°48′10″S 174°44′39″E
- Country: New Zealand
- City: Auckland
- Local authority: Auckland Council
- Electoral ward: North Shore ward
- Local board: Kaipātiki Local Board

Area
  - Land: 528 ha (1,300 acres)

Population (June 2025)
  - Total: 12,940
  - Density: 2,450/km^{2} (6,350/sq mi)
- Postcode: 0627
- Ferry terminals: Northcote Point Ferry Terminal

Birkenhead	Hillcrest	Takapuna
Birkenhead	Northcote	(Shoal Bay)
(Little Shoal Bay)	(Waitematā Harbour)	(Waitematā Harbour)

Northcote (Note: (/ˈnɔːrθkoʊt/ NORTH-koat or /ˈnɔːrθkət/ NORTH-kət) (Māori: Te Onewa)) is a suburb of Auckland in northern New Zealand. It is situated on the North Shore, on the northern shores of Waitematā Harbour, 4 kilometres (2.5 mi) northwest of the Auckland City Centre. The suburb includes the peninsula of Northcote Point where the northern approaches to the Auckland Harbour Bridge are located, and Northcote Central, the commercial centre of Northcote. Northcote features two volcanic maars.

Northcote was settled by Tāmaki Māori in the 13th and 14th centuries, and Te Onewa Pā was constructed as a headland pā to protect the wider communities. Europeans settled Northcote in the 1840s, and a community developed around the ferry terminal. Early industries included the brickworks, sulfur works and orchards, and by the 1880s Northcote beaches had become local attractions. By 1908, the area had grown enough that Northcote became a borough. After the Auckland Harbour Bridge opened in 1959, Northcote Central rapidly developed, while Northcote Point became isolated.

Northcote Borough was merged into the North Shore City in 1989, which in turn merged into the Auckland "super city" in 2010. In the late 2010s and 2020s, Northcote began an urban regeneration and housing intensification project.

== Etymology ==
Northcote is named after British Conservative politician Stafford Northcote, 1st Earl of Iddesleigh, an idea put forward by resident Major Benton. The name that dates from 1880 when the post office and school committee decided to use the name. The first name used for the peninsula on European maps was Rough Point, named after Captain David Rough, first harbourmaster of Auckland, in 1841. In 1848 it was renamed Stokes Point, after Captain John Lort Stokes of the survey vessel HMS Acheron, who named the peninsula after himself due to another location named Rough Rock near Rangitoto Island. Stokes Point was the common name for the suburb until it was renamed in 1880. The name Stokes Point remains in use for the southern headland of the peninsula.

== Geology and natural history ==
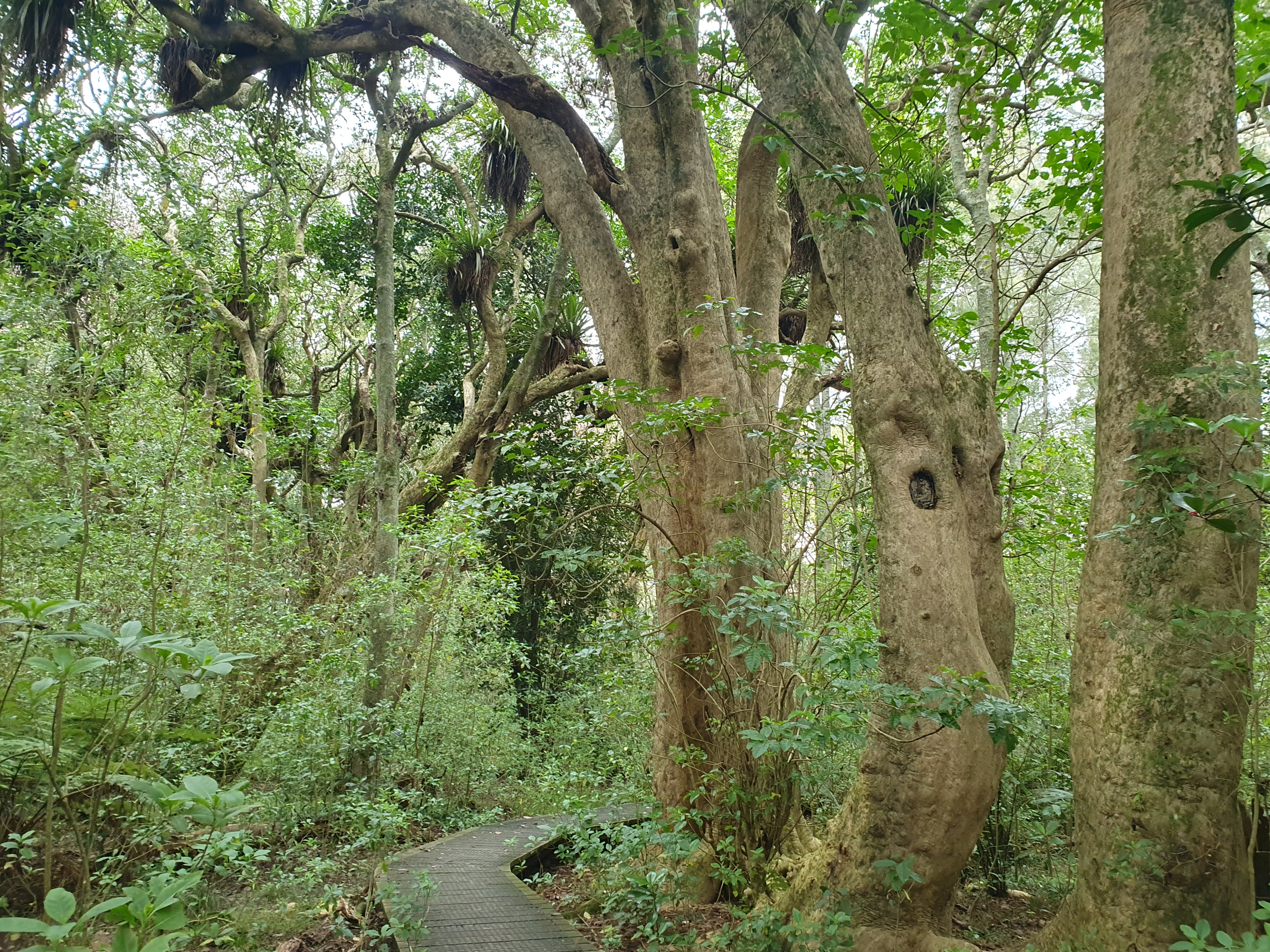
Smith's Bush is a remnant kahikatea and taraire forest located in Northcote

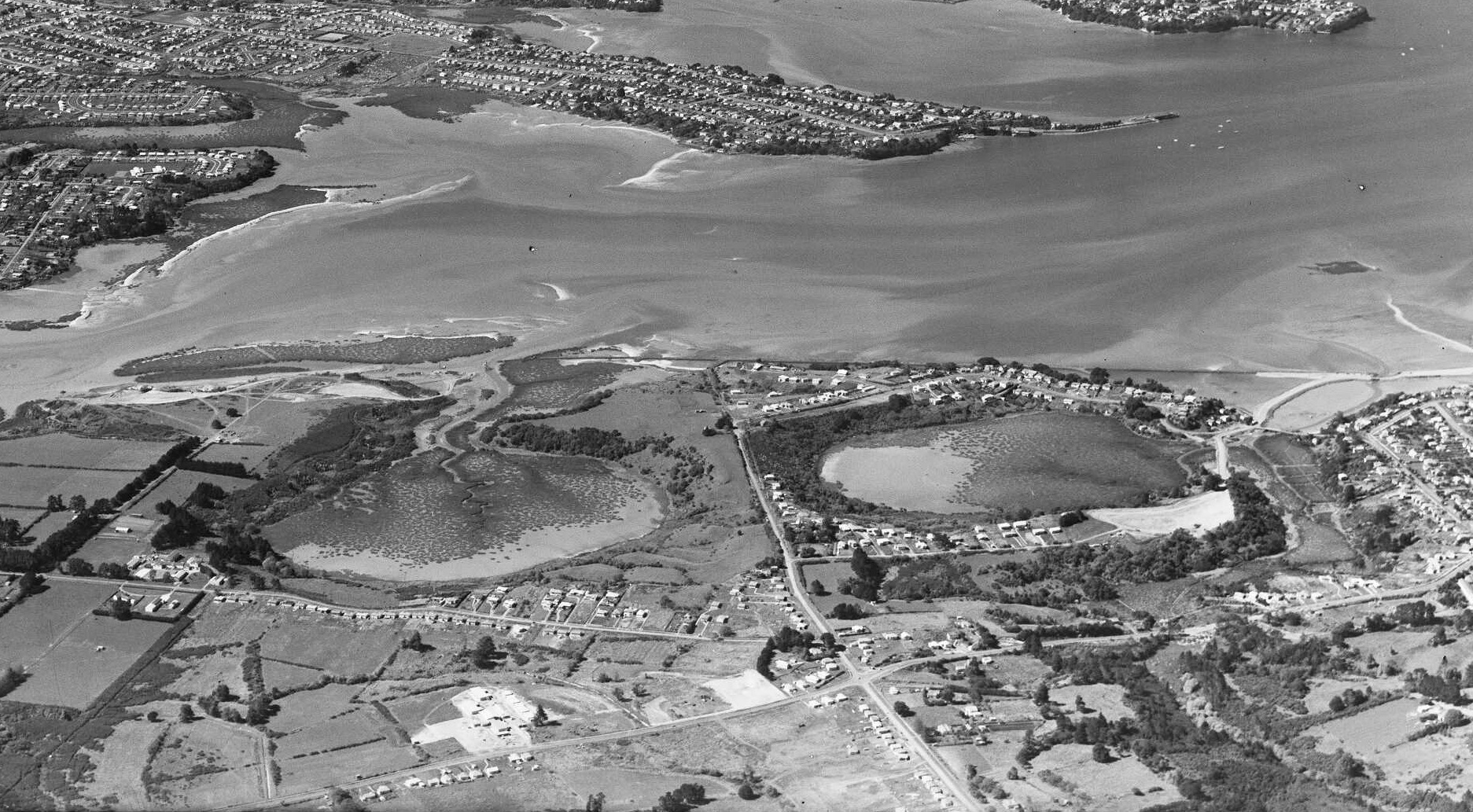
Tank Farm and Onepoto (pictured in 1957) are two volcanic maars in Northcote, estimated to have erupted between 190,000 and 180,000 years ago

The North Shore is primarily uplifted Waitemata Group sandstone, that was deposited on the sea floor during the Early Miocene, between 22 and 16 million years ago. There are two volcanic craters found on the eastern coastline of the suburb: Tank Farm, also known as Tuff Crater or Te Kōpua ō Matakamokamo, joined to the south by Onepoto (also known as Te Kōpua ō Matakerepo). Onepoto and Tank Farm erupted an estimated 187,600 and 181,000 years ago respectively.

Prior to human settlement, the inland North Shore was a mixed podocarp-broadleaf forest dominated by kauri. Pōhutukawa trees dominated the coastal margins of Birkenhead. Smiths Bush in the Onewa Domain is a remnant native forest, dominated by kahikatea and taraire trees.

== Geography ==
Northcote is composed of two suburban areas: Northcote (aka Northcote Central) to the north, and Northcote Point, the peninsula south of Onewa Road. The suburb is bound by Ocean View Road and Northcote Road in the northwest, the Auckland Northern Motorway in the northeast, and Shoal Bay in the east.

The highest point in the suburb is an 88 metres (289 ft) hill to the west on Pupuke Road, referred informally by residents in the early 20th century as Clay Hill. The hill is the location of the Pupuke Road Reservoir and Pump Station. The southern headland of the Northcote Point peninsula is called Stokes Point.

Onepoto Stream flows east through the suburb from Birkenhead, entering Shoal Bay south of Onewa Road. Hillcrest Creek flows east through the north of Northcote, entering the Waitematā Harbour at Shoal Bay, east of the Auckland Northern Motorway. Until the 1970s, the upper reaches of the creek were primarily swampland. A traditional recorded name for Hillcrest Creek is Wakatatere "The Drifting Canoe", a name which recalls an incident where a tapu waka drifted into the stream at high tide. A tributary of Hillcrest Stream, Awataha Stream, flowed through Northcote Central until the 1950s, when the stream was undergrounded. In 2019, work began to daylight the stream.

Two beaches were formerly located in Northcote along the western shores of Shoal Bay: the City of Cork Beach and Sulphur Beach. These locations were reclaimed in the 1950s, and are now located beneath the Auckland Northern Motorway.

Little Shoal Bay is found to the west of Northcote Point, which is the location of Halls Beach.

== History ==
=== Māori history ===
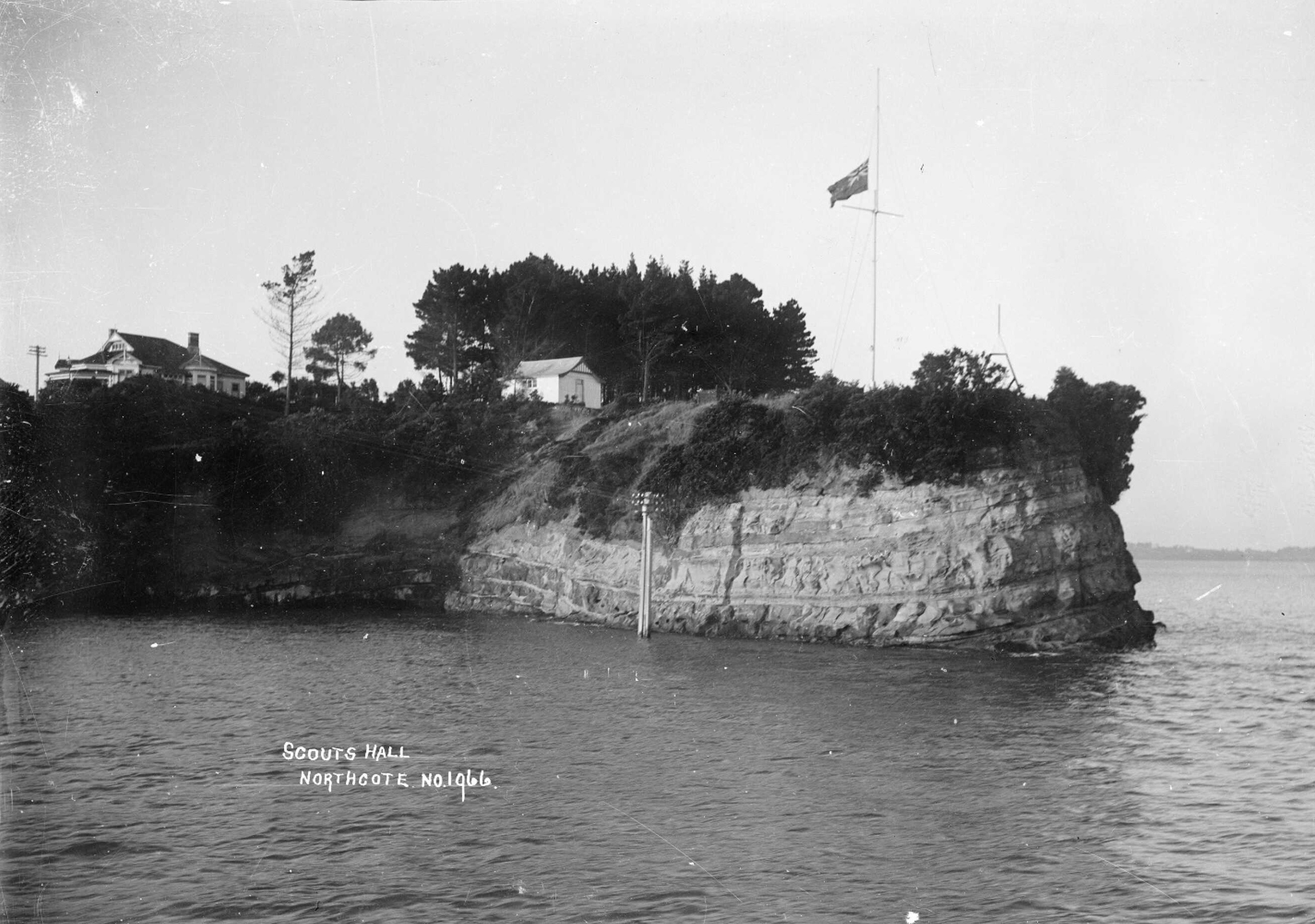
View of Tōtaratahi (i.e. Stokes Point) in the 1910s, before the construction of the Auckland Harbour Bridge. The headland was the location of Te Onewa Pā

Māori settlement of the Auckland Region began around the 13th or 14th centuries. The Tainui migratory canoe visited Northcote, stopping at Ngā Huru-a-Taiki, a sacred tree on the cliffs south-east of Tank Farm. The North Shore was settled by Tāmaki Māori, including people descended from the Tainui migratory canoe and ancestors of figures such as Taikehu and Peretū, and many of the early Tāmaki Māori people of the North Shore identified as Ngā Oho. The Shoal Bay area was used to harvest shellfish, and the volcanic soil at Northcote allowed for kūmara cultivation.

The warrior Maki migrated from the Kāwhia Harbour to his ancestral home in the Auckland Region, likely sometime in the 17th century. Maki conquered and unified many the Tāmaki Māori tribes as Te Kawerau ā Maki, including those of the North Shore. After Maki's death, his sons settled different areas of his lands, creating new hapū. His younger son Maraeariki settled the North Shore and Hibiscus Coast, who based himself at the head of the Ōrewa River. Maraeariki's daughter Kahu succeeded him, and she is the namesake of the North Shore, Te Whenua Roa o Kahu ("The Greater Lands of Kahu"). Many of the iwi of the North Shore, including Ngāti Manuhiri, Ngāti Maraeariki, Ngāti Kahu, Ngāti Poataniwha, Ngāi Tai ki Tāmaki and Ngāti Whātua, can trace their lineage to Kahu.

==== Te Riri a Mataaho ====
Northcote is part of the setting of Te Riri a Mataaho ("The Wrath of Mataaho"), a Ngāi Tai ki Tāmaki traditional story (pūrākau) that describes the creation of the two volcanic craters of Northcote, Te Kōpua ō Matakamokamo and Te Kōpua ō Matakerepo, collectively called Ngā Kōpua Rua ("The Two Deep Pools"). Two tupua (children of the Fire God Mataaho), Matakamokamo and his wife Matakerepo, lived on Te Rua Maunga, a mountain located at Lake Pupuke. The couple argued over some flax clothing that Matakerepo had made for her husband, and the argument became so heated that the fire outside their dwelling died out. Matakamokamo cursed Mahuika, Goddess of the Fire, for allowing this to happen. Mahuika was furious at the couple, and asked Mataaho to punish them. Mataaho destroyed their mountain home, and in its place left Pupuke Moana (Lake Pupuke), while at the same time he formed the mountain Rangitoto. The couple fled to the newly formed island, where Mataaho formed three peaks on the mountain, so that the couple can view the ruins of their former home. Matakamokamo and Matakerepo later returned to the mainland, which led to Mataaho further punishing them. He turned the couple into stone and caused them to link beneath the earth, forming the two volcanic craters.

==== Te Onewa Pā ====
Te Onewa Pā, also known as Whareroa, is a defensive pā that was located at the Stokes Point headland. The name Onewa refers to the ditch that separated the pā from the mainland, and is also the name of a dark grey stone tool (patu ōnewa) used for digging trenches. The site has traditional importance to Ngāi Tai ki Tāmaki, Te Kawerau ā Maki and Ngāti Paoa, and was located on the opposite shore to Point Erin, where a pā called Okā or Te Koraenga was located. Both pā sites were used as bases for summer fishing, especially shark fishing.

Te Onewa Pā site was originally occupied by Tāmaki Māori who descended from the Tainui migratory waka and developed the tribal identity Ngāi Tai ki Tāmaki. It was prized for its strategic location and view over the Waitematā Harbour, and protected fisheries and kūmara gardens of the nearby volcanic soil. The pā was repeatedly attacked in the 17th and 18th centuries. Ngāti Paoa attacked and took ownership of Onewa, who in turn were attacked by Ngāti Whātua. After Ngāti Whātua's conflict with the Waiohua paramount chief Kiwi Tāmaki in the mid-18th century, Te Onewa Pā was occupied by the Ngāti Whātua chief Tarahawaiki.

During the early 1820s, most Māori of the North Shore fled for the Waikato or Northland due to the threat of war parties during the Musket Wars, and Te Onewa Pā was left unoccupied. Some members of Ngāi Tai returned to the Northcote area in the 1830s, led by Hetaraka Takapuna. The pā was occupied until the mid-1850s, and Hetaraka Takapuna's descendants lived on the shores of Tank Farm into the 1890s.

=== Early European settlement ===
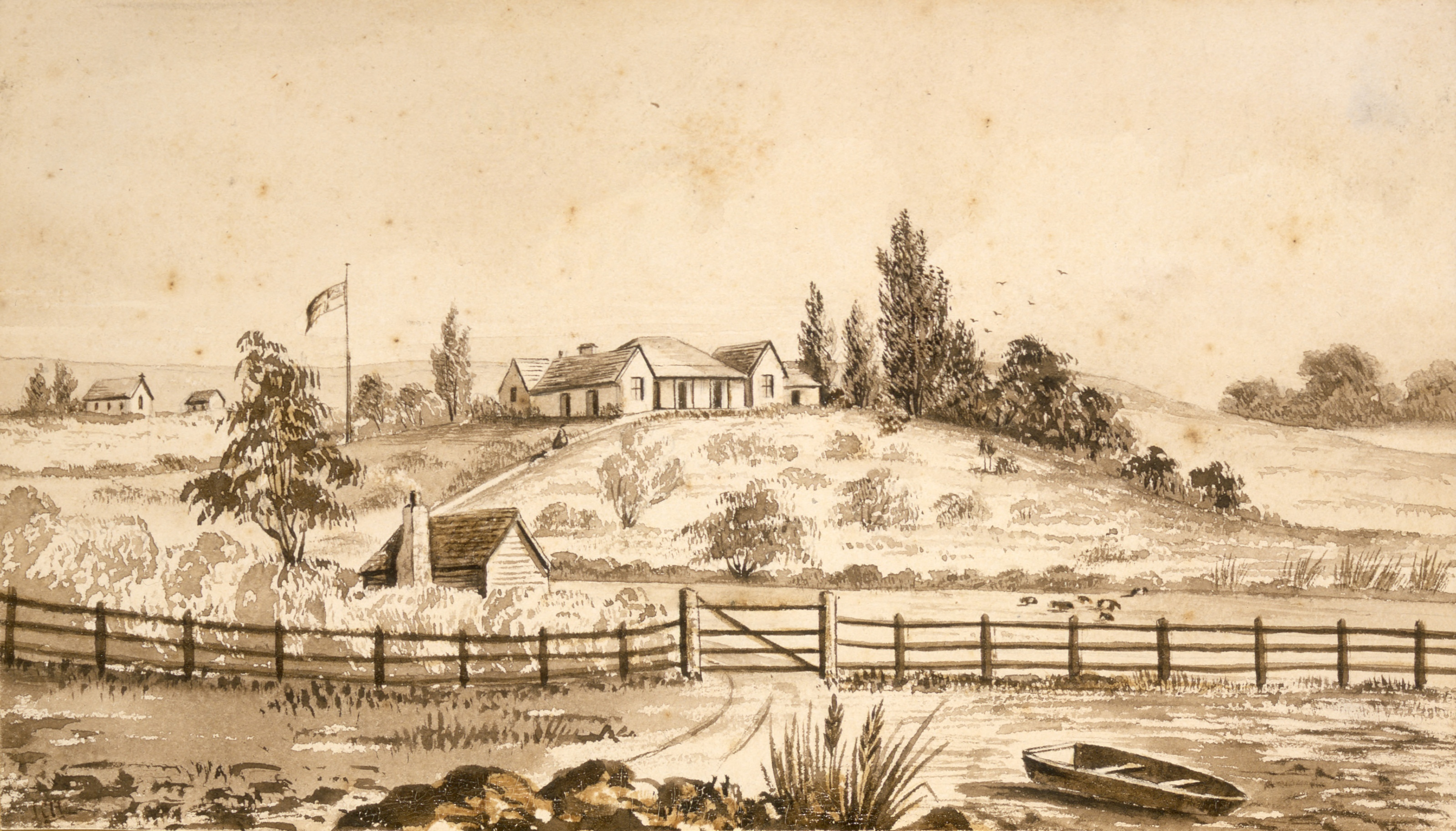
The farm of Thomas Bartley at Northcote (1860)

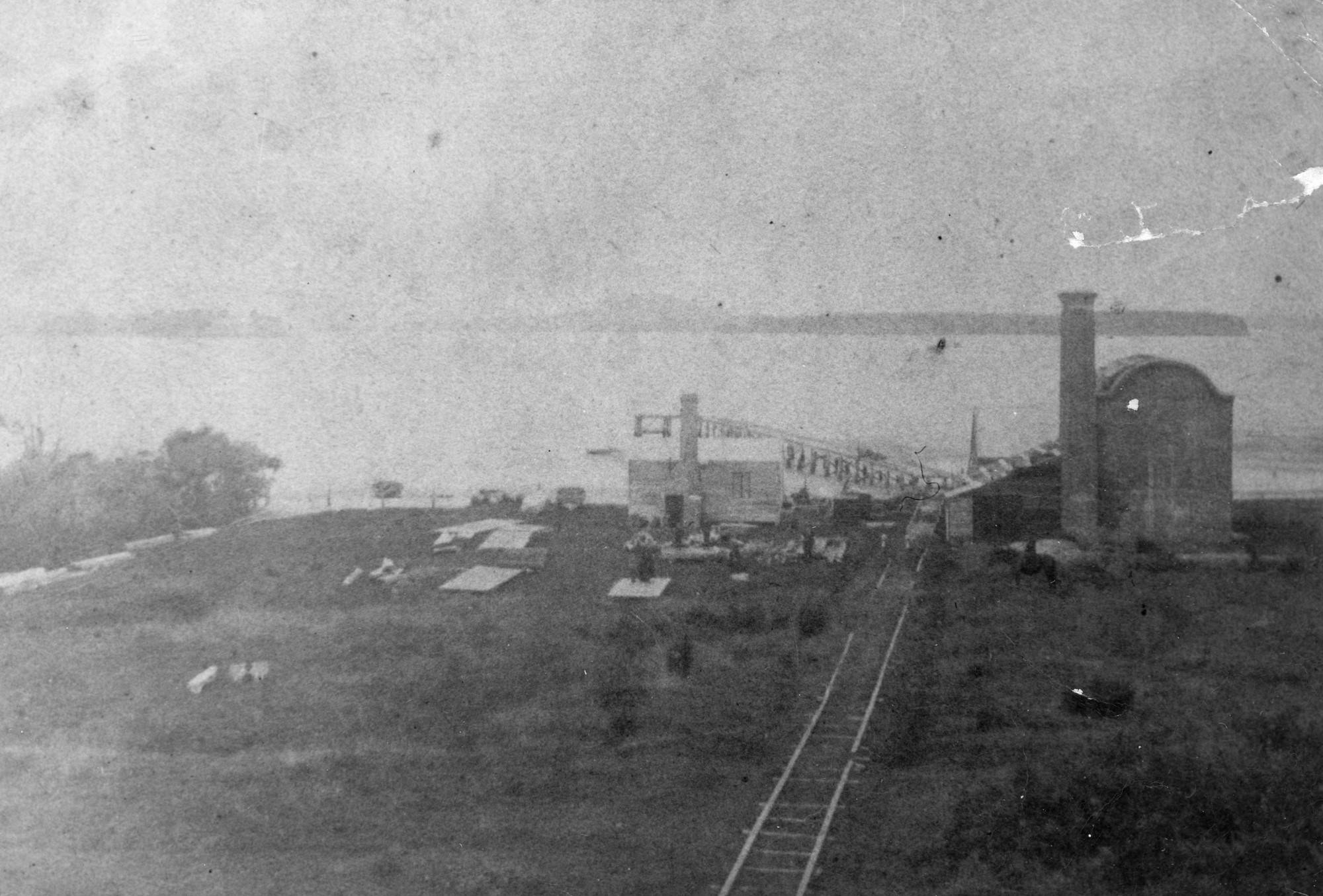
The Sulphur Works at Northcote in 1884

The Northcote area was a part of the Mahurangi Block, an area purchased by the Crown on 13 April 1841. Land at Northcote Point was subdivided into eight lots in 1843. The Callan family settled in the same year, and Phillip Callan established a brickyard at Sulphur Beach. In the next few years, other settlers including James Kelly, William Nicholson, Patrick Heath moved to Northcote. While some settlers relocated from other parts of Auckland, many of the new settlers moved from Hokianga. The greater Northcote area was purchased by the New Zealand Company in 1844, intending to develop a colonial settlement. As there was little interest in the settlement, the individual land blocks were sold. From 1848, a soap and candle factory was established on Sulphur Beach, and other early industries included timber milling and kauri gum digging.

In 1848, the Catholic Church purchased 40 acres (16 ha) of land near Northcote, building St Mary's School and the Awataha Catholic Mission. Opening in 1851, the school taught Māori and Pākehā students from across the country.

In 1852, the Crown granted land at Barry's Point / Awataha to Ngāpuhi chief Eruera Maihi Patuone, in order to create a shield for the City of Auckland against potential invasion from Ngāpuhi and other northern tribes. Patuone's people lived in the area until the 1880s.

The Northcote ferry service began in 1854, run by James Reed. The regular ferry service led to the development of Northcote. In 1859, Philip Callan constructed the Northcote Tavern, likely using bricks from his Sulphur Beach brickworks. The hotel became an early focal point of the community, and led to Northcote becoming a gateway to the north. Many people would leave their horses at the tavern while visiting Auckland city. The first ferry service from Northcote Wharf began operating from May 1860. Three months later, St John's Anglican Church was established as the earliest church in Northcote, serving both the Northcote and Birkenhead areas. The church is the oldest currently existing building on the North Shore.

In 1878, Auckland Chemical Works was established at Northcote, on the beach next to the brickworks. The factory processed sulfur from Moutohora Island in the Bay of Plenty, but was unprofitable, as the amount of sulfur estimated to be on the island was overestimated.

=== Suburban development and Awataha Catholic Mission ===
Northcote developed suburban housing between 1880 and 1910, with many of the 1880s villas still standing today. Takapuna and Northcote grew significantly during this period, despite the effects of the Long Depression. Northcote Point grew to become a commuter suburb for people working in Auckland, due to the ferry service. Many wealthy Aucklanders built homes in the Northcote area, including Mr. Caughey of Smith & Caughey's department store. Hall's Beach and Sulphur Beach became popular spots for tourists and picnickers.

From 1880 to 1910, Northcote was known for fruit production, and in 1886 the Birkenhead and Northcote Fruitgrowing Association was formed. In addition to orchards, major crops in Northcote included strawberries, peas and cucumbers. In 1885, a slaughterhouse was constructed in Northcote, serving Takapuna and the surrounding rural areas, and farms in the Northcote area specialised in providing milk supplies for Auckland.

In 1891, St Mary's School and the Awataha Catholic Mission gave permission for Māori led by Te Hemera Tauhia to resettle church lands at Awataha, some of whom were Te Kawerau ā Maki. This community established on the northern shores of Tank Farm over the next twenty years. The Catholic church, needing to raise funds to establish Hato Petera College, leased out these lands to engineer and land developer Harry Hopper Adams. Adams saw opportunity for developing the area, and trespassed the Māori of Awataha in 1916. In 1920, the whare was torn down, and residents of Awataha made petitions to parliament to stop the evictions, arguing that Awataha was not included in the Mahurangi Purchase. Some members of the Awataha community were given lifetime leases of Catholic land at Awataha, while others were arrested.

=== Borough status and growth ===
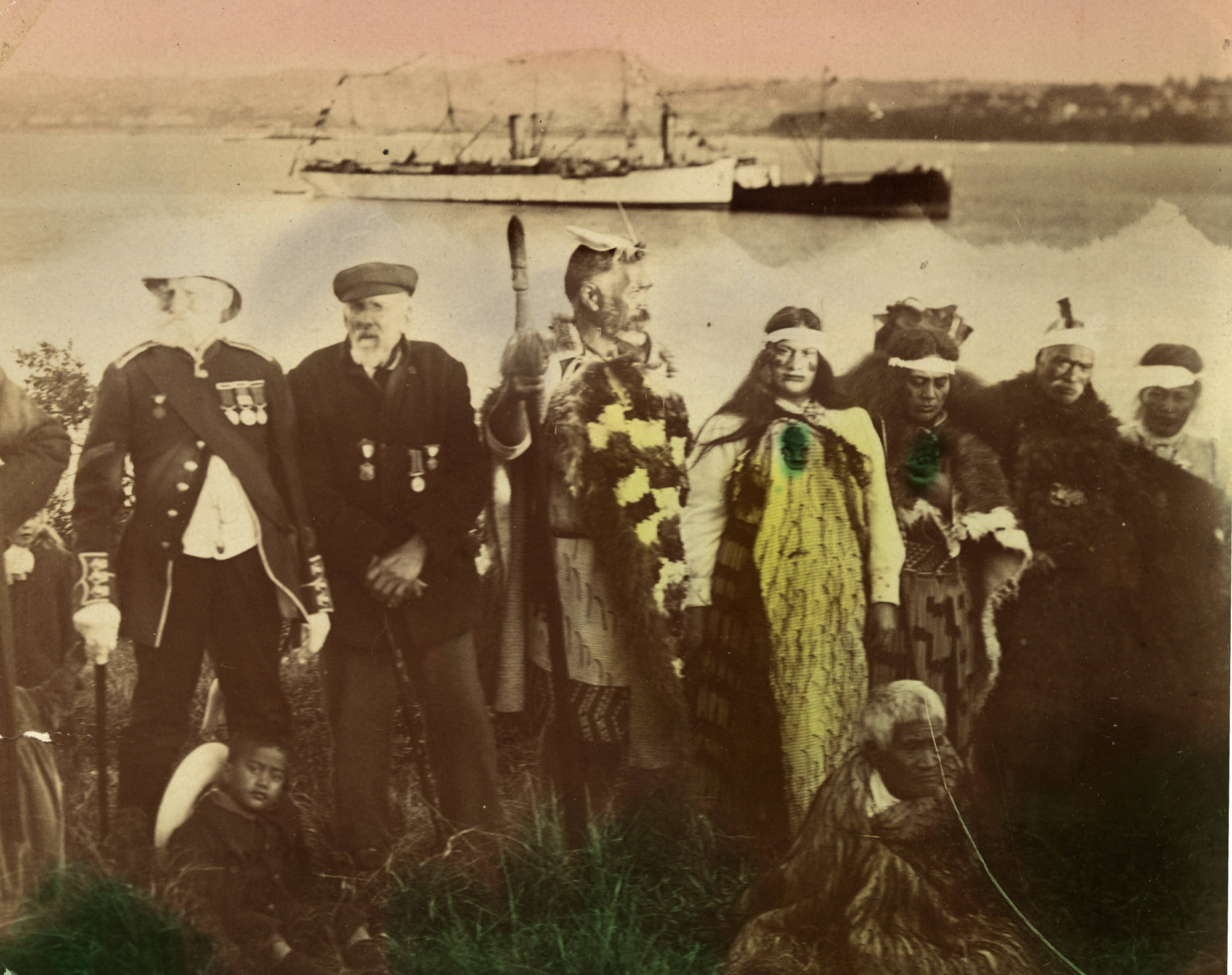
Dignitaries at the flagstaff and tōtara unveiling ceremony celebrating the establishment of the Borough of Northcote in 1908 (from left): Northcote military veterans J. Hawes, Sergeant-Major Hilditch, Hapi te Pataka (centre), Whatarangi Ngati, and her daughter Takurangi, who married ethnographer George Graham

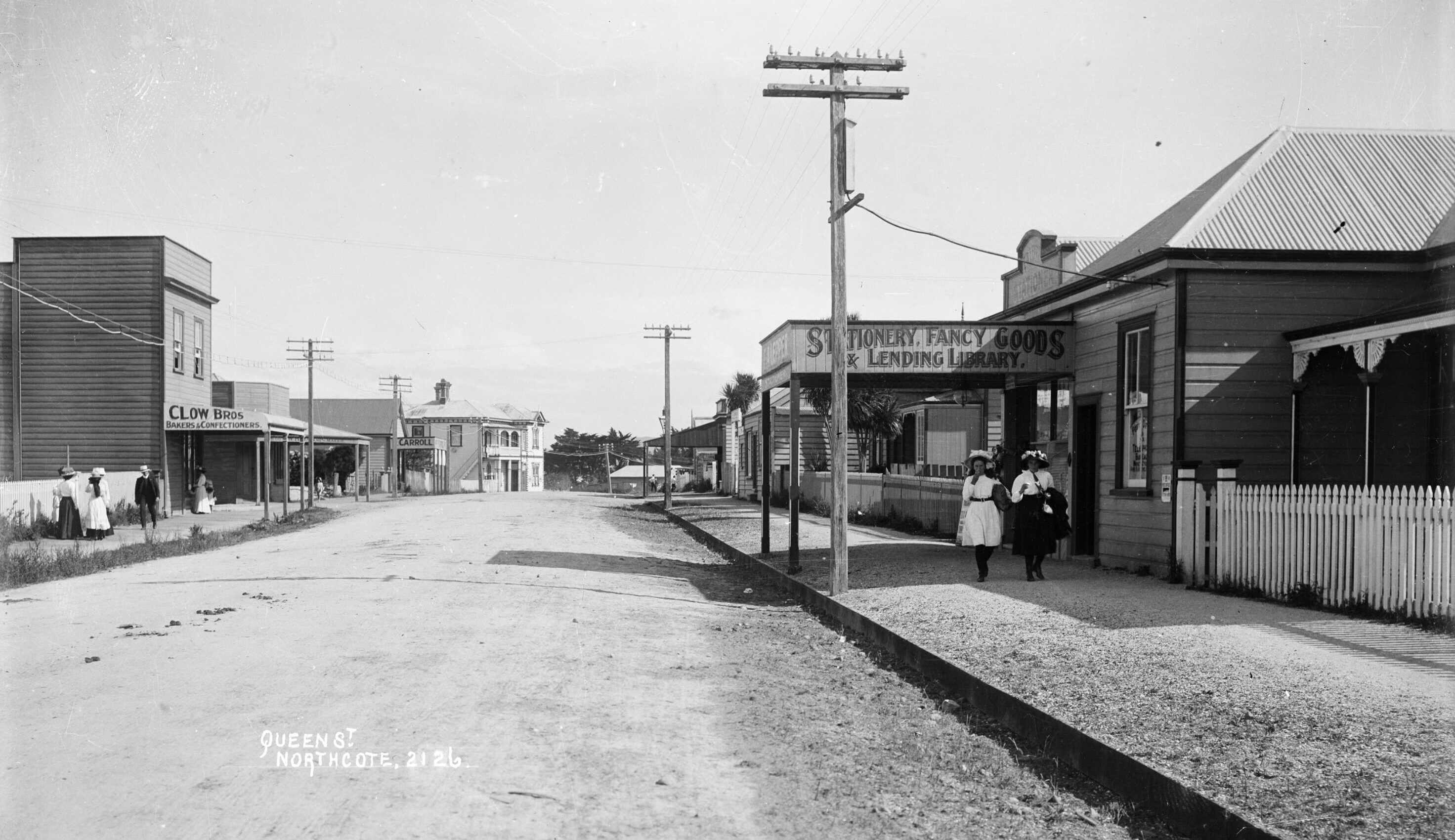
A photograph of Queen Street in Northcote, taken by William Archer Price circa 1910

In 1908, Northcote had grown enough to be proclaimed a borough, which allowed Northcote to have its own council and mayor. To celebrate this, the Stoke Point headland was proclaimed to be a public reserve. A 75 foot (23 m) flagstaff was erected at Stoke Point, a memorial tōtara tree was planted at the site, named Tainui by Māori local to the North Shore, and the Stokes Point headland gained the name Tōtara-tahi ("The Single Tōtara Tree"). The tree was later damaged in a storm.

In 1903, the Northcote Athenaeum Society was established, which organised pleasurable literary and musical evenings for residents, including recitals poetry readings and plays. In 1912, the Northcote Masonic Lodge was constructed. From the 1920s, Chinese market gardeners had begun operating in the Northcote area.

Northcote grew significantly as a suburb in the 1920s, with development focused around the Queen Street area at Northcote Point, close to the ferry terminal. A new concrete road and bus barns were constructed in 1927, joined in the same year by a cinema called the Onewa Picture Drome. Renamed the King's Theatre in the 1930s, it was renamed Bridgeway after the construction of the Auckland Harbour Bridge. By the 1920s, the gas works at Little Shoal Bay, first established in 1902, had become the biggest single employer in the Northcote Borough.

In 1942, during World War II, the United States Army established bulk fuel storage tanks at the northern of the two volcanic craters, which led to its common name Tank Farm. As a part of this construction, the Awataha urupā (cemetery ground) was removed.

In the 1950s, a small state housing development was constructed in central Northcote. The Northcote War Memorial Library, designed by Thorpe, Cutter, Pickmere and Douglas, was formally opened on 10 March 1956. The library was funded through local carnivals and grants from the New Zealand Government.

=== Auckland Harbour Bridge ===
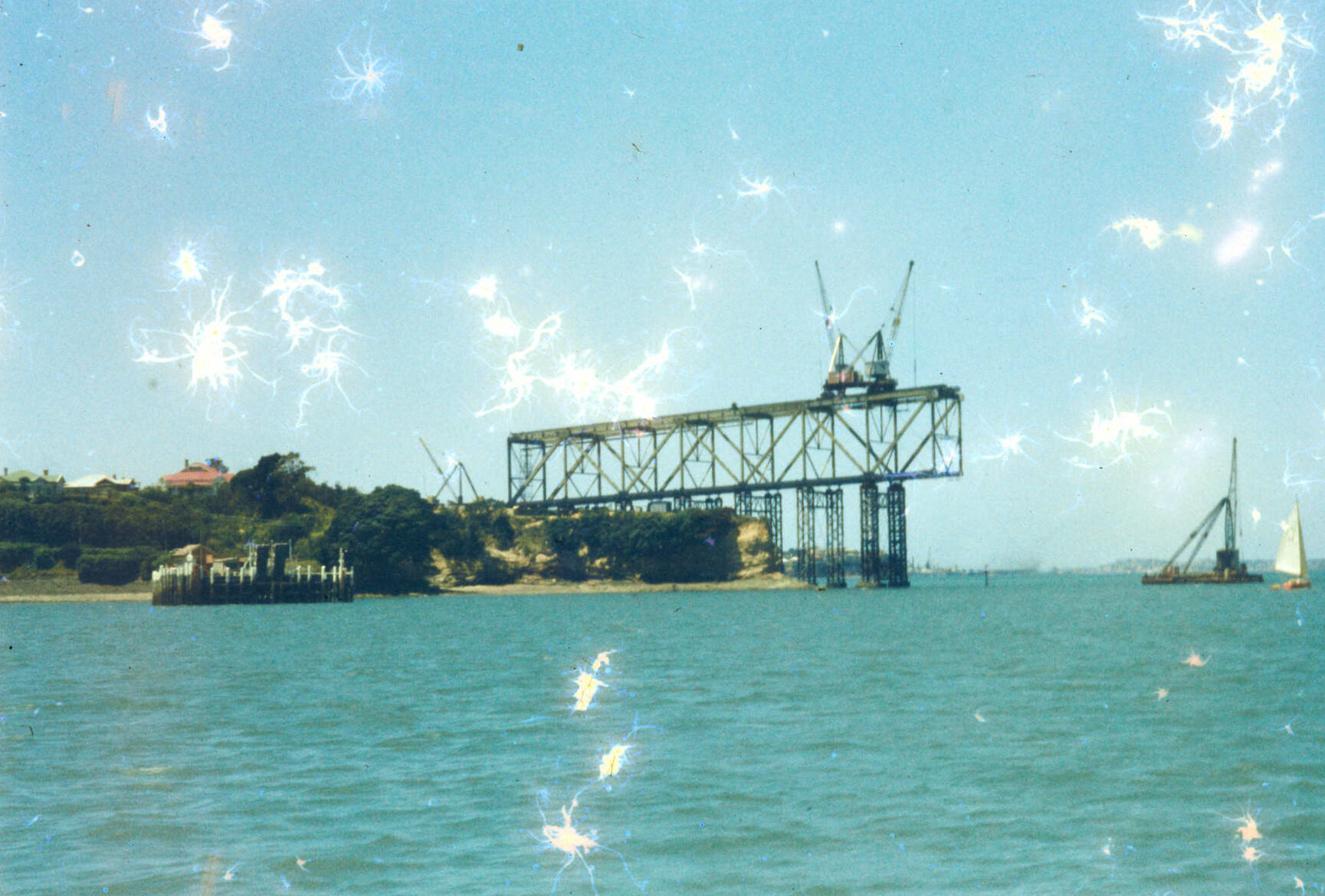
Construction of the Auckland Harbour Bridge (1956)

A bridge across the Waitematā Harbour between Auckland and the North Shore had been discussed since the 1860s. Plans for a bridge crossing were formalised in the 1940s, with construction in Northcote beginning in the mid-1950s.

Construction of the harbour bridge and the Auckland Northern Motorway led to major changes in the environment. Much of Te Onewa Pā on Stokes Point was destroyed to make way for the harbour bridge landing, as well as parts of the Onewa Domain including the pine trees and ensign. The eastern coastline beaches were reclaimed to make way for the motorway. During the 1960s, the Onepoto Basin, formerly open to the harbour, was drained and redeveloped into recreational facilities.

The harbour bridge was officially opened on 30 May 1959. Northcote Shopping Centre was opened by the Borough council on 19 June 1959, which led to northern Northcote becoming the commercial centre of the suburb and a growth hub. Former farmland was suburbanised, and an industrial area developed at Barry's Point. While Northcote Central grew, the Northcote Point community suffered after the opening of the bridge. The ferry service was stopped, shops at Northcote Point closed, and Queen Street, once a major road, became a side street.

=== Later developments and urban regeneration ===
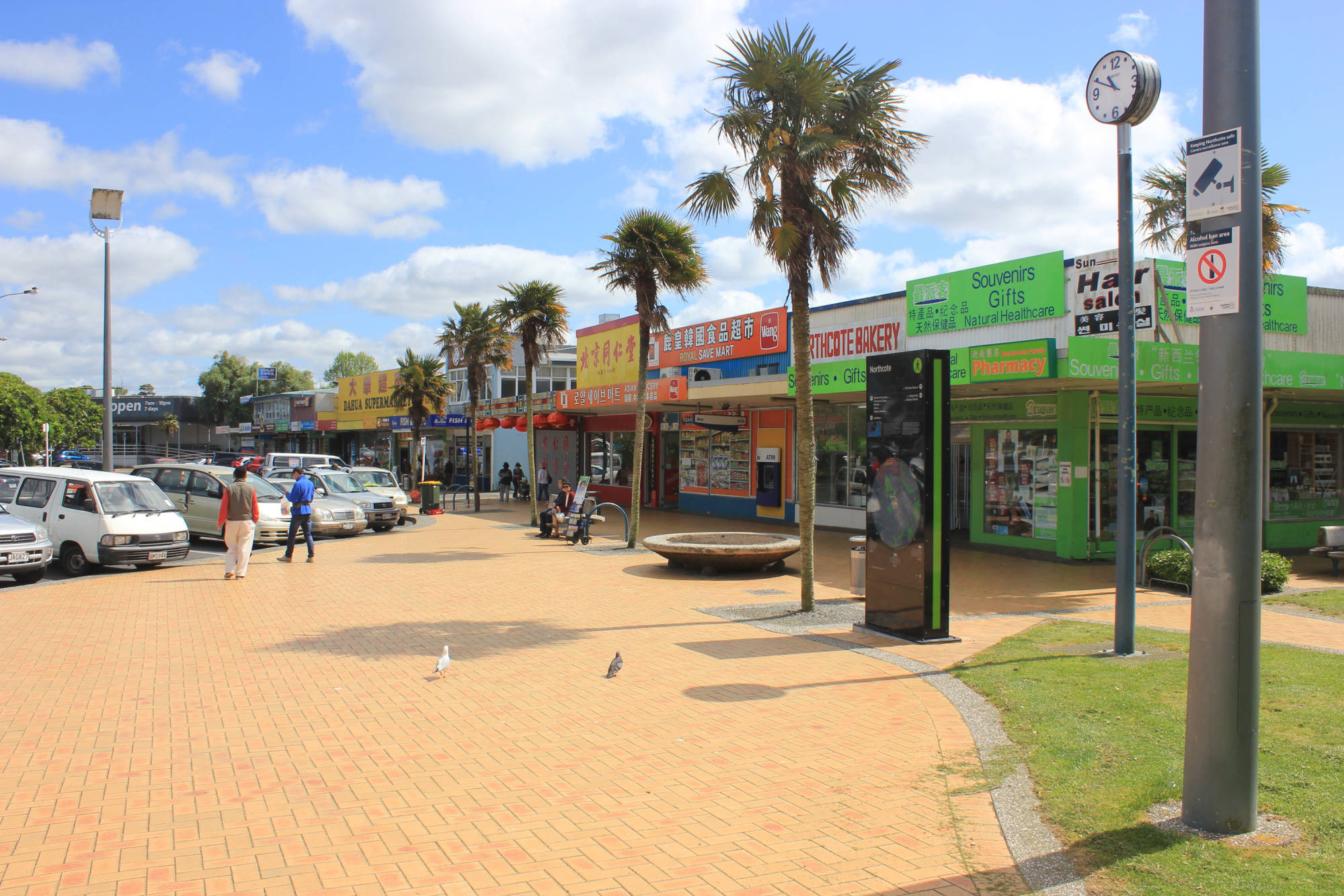
Shops in Northcote Town Centre in 2016

In 1966, the North Shore Teachers College moved to a new campus at Northcote. In 1971, a feature seafood restaurant called Fisherman's Wharf was built by restaurateur Bob Sell, adjacent to Northcote wharf. While the restaurant closed two years later, the building is currently known as The Wharf, an events centre.

In 1989, Northcote Borough was merged into the North Shore City. By the 1990s, Asian communities had begun to develop at Northcote. In the 2000s, the Chinese New Zealander community of Northcote started holding annual Chinese New Year parades in the suburb.

In the late 1990s, the former Smale family farm was redeveloped into Smales Farm, a commercial complex adjacent to the motorway. This was joined by the Akoranga Business Park, developed adjacent to the headquarters for The Warehouse Group.

Under the Auckland Unitary Plan, Northcote was identified as a key area for planned intensification. Gentrification became a more prominent issue in Northcote during this period. 1,700 new homes are planned to be constructed in Northcote in the 2020s, while at the same time a new greenway reneration project was established in Northcote. Te Ara Awataha is an urban renewal project which includes a series of urban parks, native plant regeneration, and daylighting the Awataha Stream, which had been undergrounded in stormwater pipes in the 1950s.

== Demographics ==
Northcote covers 5.28 km^{2} (2.04 sq mi) and had an estimated population of 12,940 as of June 2025, with a population density of 2,451 people per km^{2}.

Historical population
Year	Pop.	±% p.a.
2006	10,779	—
2013	11,043	+0.35%
2018	11,481	+0.78%
2023	11,541	+0.10%

Northcote had a population of 11,541 in the 2023 New Zealand census, an increase of 60 people (0.5%) since the 2018 census, and an increase of 498 people (4.5%) since the 2013 census. There were 5,538 males, 5,955 females and 48 people of other genders in 4,116 dwellings. 4.4% of people identified as LGBTIQ+. There were 1,866 people (16.2%) aged under 15 years, 2,547 (22.1%) aged 15 to 29, 5,160 (44.7%) aged 30 to 64, and 1,965 (17.0%) aged 65 or older.

People could identify as more than one ethnicity. The results were 62.9% European (Pākehā); 9.1% Māori; 7.0% Pasifika; 28.5% Asian; 3.4% Middle Eastern, Latin American and African New Zealanders (MELAA); and 1.5% other, which includes people giving their ethnicity as "New Zealander". English was spoken by 92.4%, Māori language by 1.5%, Samoan by 1.2%, and other languages by 28.4%. No language could be spoken by 2.6% (e.g. too young to talk). New Zealand Sign Language was known by 0.2%. The percentage of people born overseas was 41.1, compared with 28.8% nationally.

Religious affiliations were 32.2% Christian, 2.4% Hindu, 1.5% Islam, 0.2% Māori religious beliefs, 2.1% Buddhist, 0.3% New Age, 0.2% Jewish, and 1.5% other religions. People who answered that they had no religion were 54.1%, and 5.7% of people did not answer the census question.

Of those at least 15 years old, 4,044 (41.8%) people had a bachelor's or higher degree, 3,714 (38.4%) had a post-high school certificate or diploma, and 1,908 (19.7%) people exclusively held high school qualifications. 1,902 people (19.7%) earned over $100,000 compared to 12.1% nationally. The employment status of those at least 15 was that 5,217 (53.9%) people were employed full-time, 1,215 (12.6%) were part-time, and 240 (2.5%) were unemployed.

Individual statistical areas
Name	Area (km^{2})	Population	Density (per km^{2})	Dwellings	Median age	Median income
Northcote Central	0.69	2,361	3,422	822	32.3 years	$49,100
Akoranga	1.16	1,293	1,115	540	53.6 years	$28,500
Northcote South	1.14	2,580	2,263	894	35.2 years	$53,600
Northcote Tuff Crater	1.11	2,241	2,019	774	35.3 years	$54,700
Northcote Point	1.18	3,066	2,598	1,086	39.9 years	$60,600
New Zealand					38.1 years	$41,500

== Local government ==
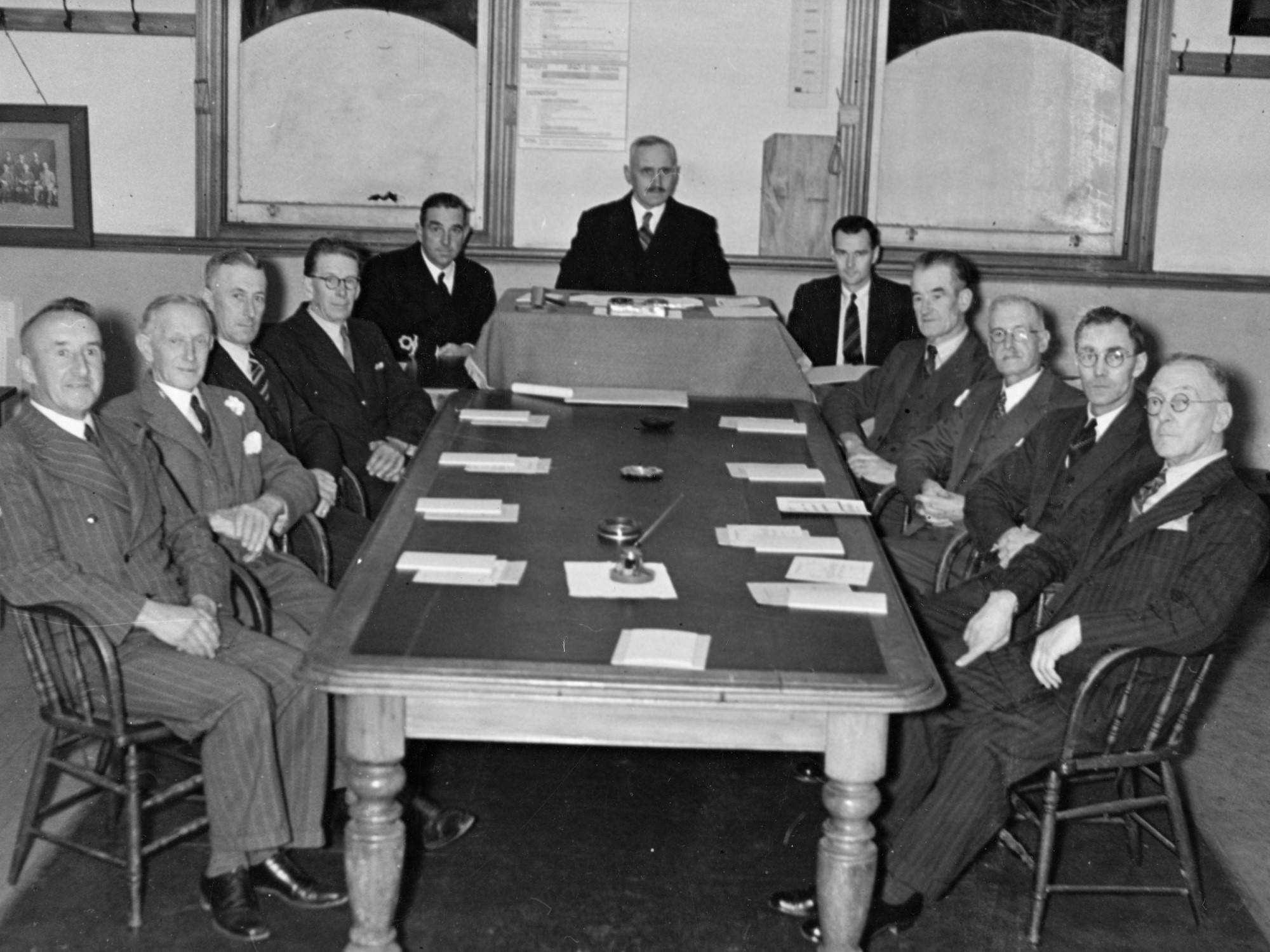
The Northcote Borough Council in 1941

The first local government in the area was the North Shore Highway District, which began operating in 1868 and administered roading and similar projects across the North Shore. Two road districts, Stokes Point (1878) and Northcote (1884–1899) had administered the area prior to the formation of a borough. In 1908 after the population reached 1,000, Northcote separated from Waitemata County and formed the Borough of Northcote.

In 1989, Northcote was merged into the North Shore City. North Shore City was amalgamated into Auckland Council in November 2010.

Within the Auckland Council, Northcote is a part of the Kaipātiki local government area governed by the Kaipātiki Local Board. It is a part of the North Shore ward, which elects two councillors to the Auckland Council.

=== Mayors of Northcote Borough ===
During its existence, from 1908 to 1989, Northcote Borough had 15 mayors. The following is a complete list:

	Name	Portrait	Term of office
1	Alexander Bruce		1908
2	Herbert Cadness		1908–1912
3	George Fraser		1912–1917
4	John Byrne Tonar		1917–1919
5	Arthur Edwin Greenslade		1919–1921
6	William Ernest Richardson		1921–1925
7	Charles Archibald Deuxberry		1925–1927
(5)	Arthur Edwin Greenslade		1927–1931
8	Robert Martin		1931–1941
9	Ernest Clyde Fowler		1941–1944
10	Frank Montague Pearn		1944–1956
11	John Forsyth Potter		1956–1962
12	Jim Holdaway		1962–1968
13	Alfred James Evans		1968–1974
14	Trevor Edwin La Roche		1974–1979
15	Jean Sampson		1979–1989

== Amenities ==
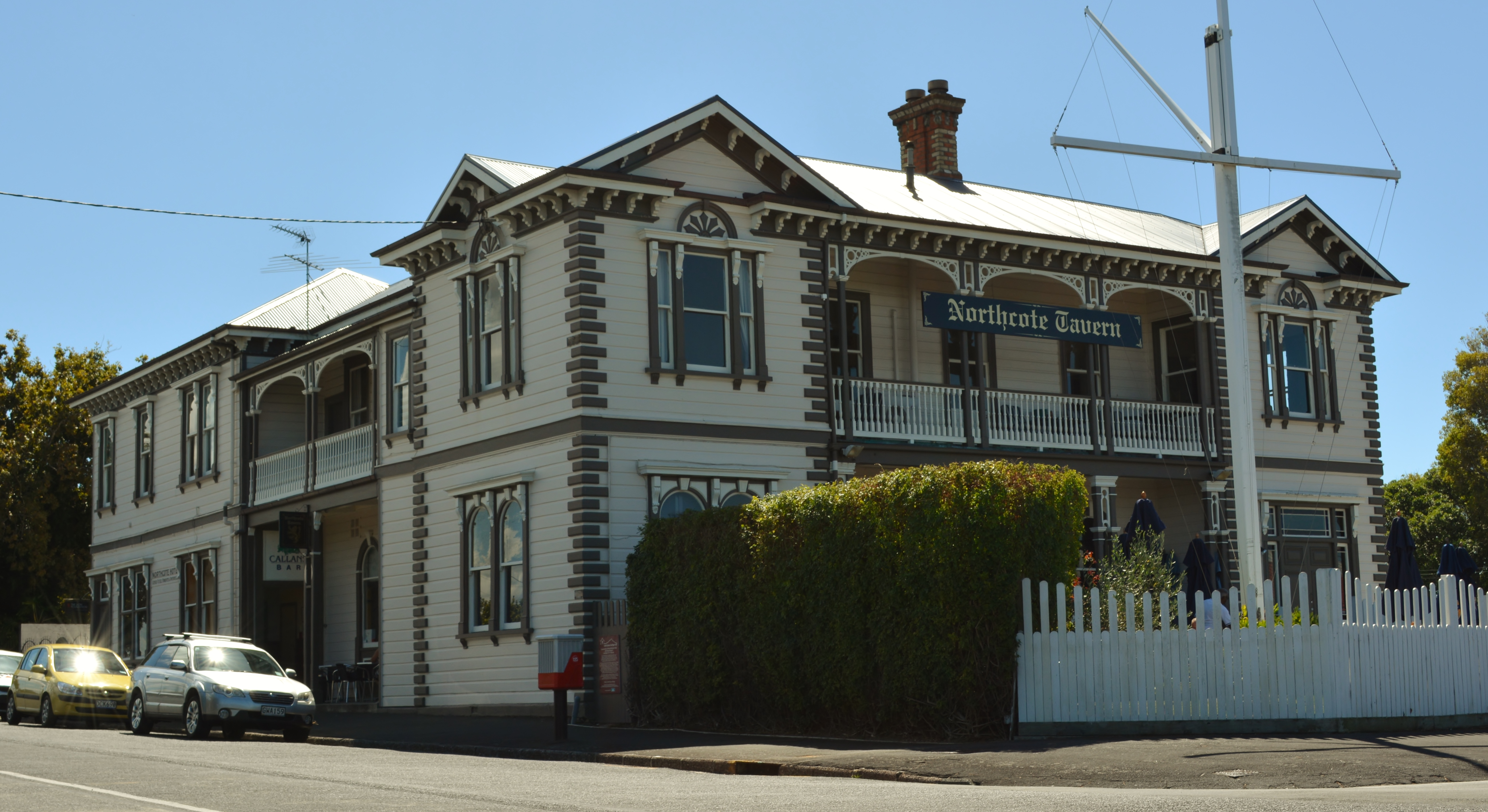
Northcote Tavern

- Smiths Bush in the Onewa Domain is a remnant native forest, dominated by kahikatea and taraire trees. Originally purchased by Alexander Mackay, his son-in-law Thomas Drummond preserved the forest from milling. The park became a public reserve in 1942, and received its name from James and Catherine Smith, the owners of the land who preserved it in the early 20th century. A large section of the forest was felled in 1959, during the construction of the Auckland Northern Motorway.
- Northart is a gallery and community centre located in Northcote, which focuses on exhibiting artists from the North Shore.
- Kauri Glen is a steep area of remnant native bush that was reserved in 1907.
- Northcote Tavern was first built in the late 1850s by Irish immigrant Philip Callan, the building was destroyed by fire and rebuilt in 1888. Originally a hotel, the building became a tavern after the opening of the Auckland Harbour Bridge in 1959 meant that fewer people needed overnight stays on the North Shore.
- St John the Baptist (Anglican Church)
- Stokes Point Reserve, the location of Te Onewa Pā. Established as a reserve in 1908, the area became less inviting after the construction of the Auckland Harbour Bridge in the 1950s. In 2015, the reserve was redeveloped as an area celebrating heritage, including designs by Lucy Tukua of Ngāti Pāoa.

== Notable people ==
- George Graham, New Zealand ethnographer, lived at Northcote Point in the early 1900s.

== Education ==
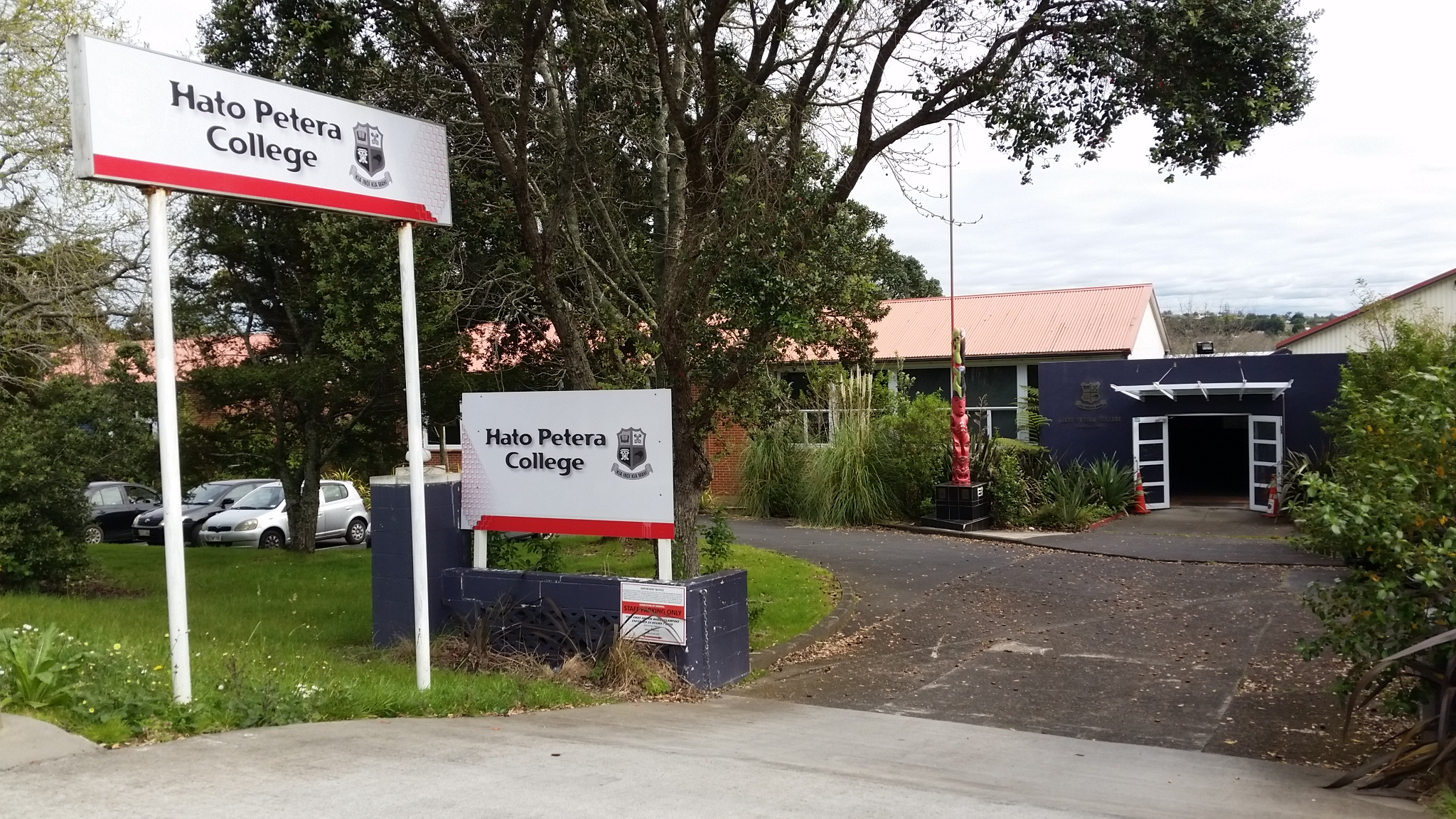
Hato Petera College in 2018

The first school in Northcote was Stokes Point School (later Northcote School), established in 1873. Located at the site of Northcote College, the schoolhouse was built in 1878. By the 1920s, the school had developed a reputation for strict teaching methods and harsh discipline, leading many families to send their children to Wellesley Street School in central Auckland. In 1924, the school became a junior high school.

Northcote College is a coeducational secondary (years 9–13) school with a roll of 1,603. It was established in 1877. Northcote Intermediate is an intermediate (years 7–8) school with a roll of 672. It celebrated its 50th jubilee in 2008. Onepoto School is a contributing primary (years 1–6) school with a roll of 151. It shares a site with Northcote Intermediate.

During its early years, the College incorporated Standards five and six (Forms one and two) which were transferred to Northcote Intermediate School when that was established as a separate entity on its present site in Lake Road in Northcote Central in 1958.

Northcote Primary School is a coeducational contributing primary (years 1–6) school with a roll of 406. It was established on its present site in 1918. The Northcote area war memorial stands at the front of the school, on the corner of Lake and Onewa Roads.

St Mary's School is a primary school with a roll of 327. It is a state integrated Catholic school, which provides education for both boys and girls in years 1–6, and for girls only in years 7–8. It celebrated its 75th Jubilee in 2008.

Rolls are as of July 2026.

Auckland University of Technology has its North Campus on Akoranga Drive.

Hato Petera College was a secondary (years 9–13) school. It opened as Saint Peter's Catechist School in 1928 and changed its name in 1972. It was a state integrated Catholic Māori school, and offered full-time boarding for enrolled students until the end of 2016, when it became a day school. It closed in 2018.

== Sport and recreation ==
The suburb is also home to the Northcote Tigers rugby league club, which was founded in 1910. The Northcote and Birkenhead Rugby Union Club was founded 1929.

== Transport ==
Northcote is adjacent to the Auckland Northern Motorway, which runs along the east of the suburb. Auckland ferry services run by Fullers360 stop at Northcote Point, near the northern end of the Auckland Harbour Bridge.

In the year 2000, a Northern Busway station was proposed for Northcote, located on Stafford Road. This proposed station was cancelled in December 2000, after lobbying by residents, who were concerned about increased traffic and public transport in the area.

== Bibliography ==
- Christmas, Judith (1983), A History of Northcote, Northcote Borough Council, OCLC 154573998, Wikidata Q123591383
- McClure, Margaret (1987). The Story of Birkenhead. Birkenhead City Council. ISBN 0-908704-04-6. OL 33998949W. Wikidata Q120679112.
- Verran, David (2010), The North Shore: An Illustrated History, North Shore: Random House, OL 33434370W, Wikidata Q120520385
