= Pauline Stansfield =

New Zealand disability advocate (1939–2022)

Pauline Stansfield MNZM JP
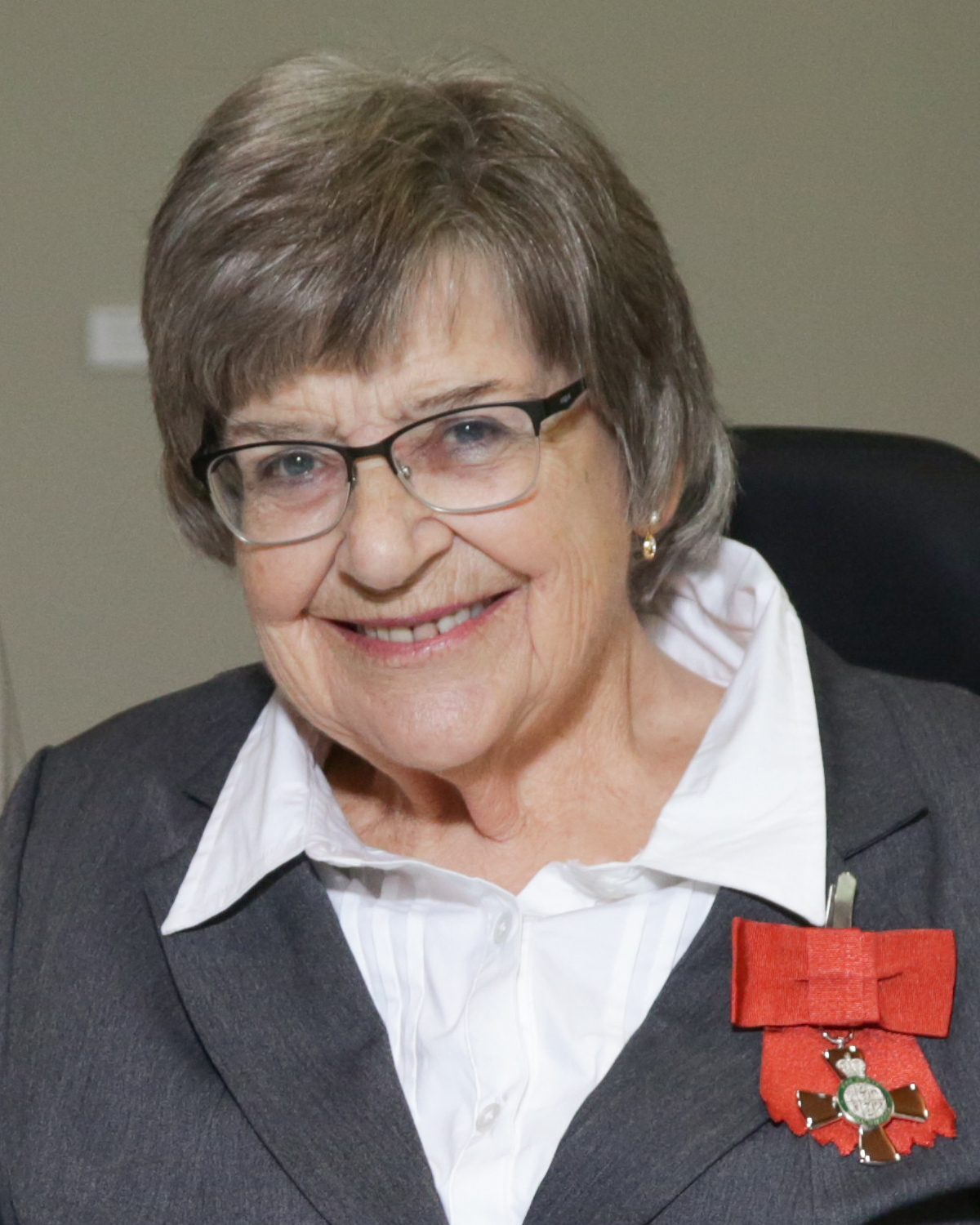
- Stansfield in 2020
- Born: 23 September 1939; Birkenhead, New Zealand
- Died: 16 July 2022 (aged 82); Auckland, New Zealand
- Occupations: Disability advocate; piano teacher; writer

Pauline Alice Roycroft Stansfield MNZM JP (23 September 1939 – 16 July 2022) was a New Zealand disability rights advocate. Having trained as a nurse, in 1969 she was paralysed from the waist down after a bus accident in Russia. From the 1970s she became involved with organisations supporting people with disabilities including the Paraplegic Association and the North Shore Disabled Persons Assembly, and advocated for the rights of people with disabilities. She also worked as a piano teacher. In 2017 she published her autobiography, Russia Changed My Life.

== Life and career ==
Stansfield was born on 23 September 1939 in the Auckland suburb of Birkenhead, and attended Auckland Girls' Grammar School. After graduating from high school she trained as a nurse, and as a young woman moved to London where she worked at the Royal Free Hospital. On 10 June 1969, aged 30, she was involved in a bus accident while travelling in Russia that left her paralysed from the waist down. She was in hospital in Moscow until August of that year when she was transferred to the spinal recovery unit at Stoke Mandeville Hospital. In 1973 she returned to New Zealand where she worked as a nursing tutor, first in Auckland and then in Wellington.

Stansfield became an advocate for people with disabilities. In the early 1970s, she became a committee member of the Paraplegic Association; in this role she helped organise sporting activities for disabled people and sought to improve building accessibility. She was involved in the International Year of Disabled Persons in 1981 and worked to ensure funds were allocated to people most in need. She served as secretary of the North Shore Disabled Persons Assembly for 11 years.

Stansfield worked to educate people about wheelchair use, and volunteered at the Ōtara Spinal Unit to provide support for people recovering from spinal injuries. She was also involved with the Ministry of Elevate Christian Disability Trust, was a justice of the peace, and worked as a piano teacher.

Over many years Stansfield wrote her autobiography, Russia Changed my Life, which outlined her journey and experiences since her accident. It was published in 2017 and a book launch was held at Takapuna Library.

In the 2020 New Year Honours, Stansfield was appointed a Member of the New Zealand Order of Merit, for services to people with disabilities. She died in Auckland on 16 July 2022, aged 82.
