= Edward Stothard =

English footballer

Personal information
- Full name: Edward Stothard
- Date of birth: 16 November 1893
- Place of birth: Benwell, England
- Date of death: 1955 (aged 61–62)
- Position: Wing half

Senior career*
Years	Team	Apps	(Gls)
1918–1919	Scotswood		
1919–1924	South Shields	32	(0)
1924–1926	West Stanley		
1926	Throckley Welfare		
Total		32	(0)
- * Club domestic league appearances and goals

Edward Stothard (16 November 1893 – 1955) was an English footballer who played in the Football League for South Shields.
