= Three Wise Cousins =

Samoan film

Three Wise Cousins is a 2016 Samoan comedic film directed by writer and director Stallone Vaiaoga-Ioasa, also known for other films such as Hibiscus & Ruthless, Take Home Pay and Mama’s Music Box, which mainly featured Pacific island life and ways of living. Although the film was shot on a “shoe-string budget” with a cast of unknown actors, Three Wise Cousins successfully racked up more than $1 million at New Zealand and Australian box offices. In its sixth week after being premiered in New Zealand, the film banked more than $700,00 at the box office. In addition, the film continues to get recognition from outside New Zealand as it was selected for the Audience Award at the Festival des Antipodes in France.

Three Wise Cousins was inspired by the real experiences and Samoan upbringing of director Vaiaoga-Ioasa which were influenced by “lectures from his parents about the importance of acknowledging one’s own roots” and culture. By doing this, the director uses humour as an important tool to get the message across for the audience to not only enjoy the film but to also grasp the main themes highlighted from Adam's (protagonist) experience. As of now, the director continues to expand and promote his feature film to more audiences across the Pacific region and around the globe.

== Plot ==
Three Wise Cousins tells the story of Adam (Neil Amituanai), a young New Zealand-born Samoan man who embarks on a journey back to his homeland, to become a ‘real island guy’. In hopes of impressing his crush Mary (Gloria Ofa Blake), Adam travels to Samoa to find his cousins Mose (Vito Vito) and Tavita (Fesui Viliamu) to learn and practise Faʻa Sāmoa ways so he can become a 'real island guy' for Mary. In New Zealand, Adam is unemployed and spends most of his time on his PlayStation. While his parents wake up early for work to earn money for the family, Adam continues to spend time on his PlayStation and rest at home without carrying any sort of responsibility.

Upon arriving in Samoa, Adam becomes unfamiliar with his culture as he did not have any forms of life experience in the island. Adam came to the realisation that he did not fit Maria's ideal type of a ‘real island guy’ and therefore, he was eager to become one for his crush. By looking for ways to do this, Adam went in search for his cousins from Samoa to help him. Adam's cousins, Mose (Vito Vito) and Tavita (Fesui Viliamu) were eager to help him learn the basic Faʻa Sāmoa ways of living such as climbing a coconut tree, cleaning the fale, making the Earth oven (umu), weaving baskets and much more. While these tasks may be easy for Mose and Tavita, Adam struggled to keep up with the hectic pace of a typical Samoan lifestyle. He was trained to wake up early every morning to start on chores and work in the plantation. Although it took a while for Adam to get familiar with the new environment and people, he eventually adapted to the Samoan lifestyle which he greatly enjoyed. He learned valuable lessons about his culture and Faʻa Sāmoa ways of living. By learning basic Samoan tasks and chores, he learns a valuable lesson to rebuild a connection with his cultural identity and learn more about the power of communal and family bonding. Through this message, many Samoan and Pacific Islanders of the diaspora find Adam's experiences to be relatable and meaningful.

== Cast ==
- Neil Amituanai as Adam
- Vito Vito as Mose
- Fesuiai Viliamu as Tavita
- Gloria Blake as Mary
- Valelia Ioane
- Maiava Taufau
- Susana Fanueli
- Poinsettia Taefu
- Harrison Rolleston
- Leste Leui
- Fa'aleo Leui
- Simi Leui
- Paulo Situi
- Ve'a Leui Tagaloa
- Petia Vui Tavete
- Karl Tusini-Rex

== Reception ==
Leilani Momoisea, Radio New Zealand International writer noted:

"Gloria Ofa Blake plays Adam's love interest, Mary, and says she hopes people support the movie to show the Pacific Island community that they have a place in the film industry. To come and just see and support and get a inside look into just what the culture is about. I don't think there is anyone who wouldn't appreciate a good laugh, and that's what Pacific people are about. For some, like Keleva Faleatua, there were feelings of nostalgia, "It took me back in the islands, actually. It was amazing just to see all the scenery, especially preparing all the umu. The lifestyle, what we used to do, waking up in the morning, that was fantastic. I was very chuffed to see that.” -

Leilani highlights the main aspects of the film which stood out to the crew members and some of the audiences. For some, it was a vaka of memories sailing back to the island life they used to experience. But for others, it was an Adam experience that took them on a “cultural ride” to explore and learn about the Samoan culture and heritage for the first time in their lives.
