= Onepoto (volcanic crater) =

Coordinates: 36.80818°S 174.75085°E

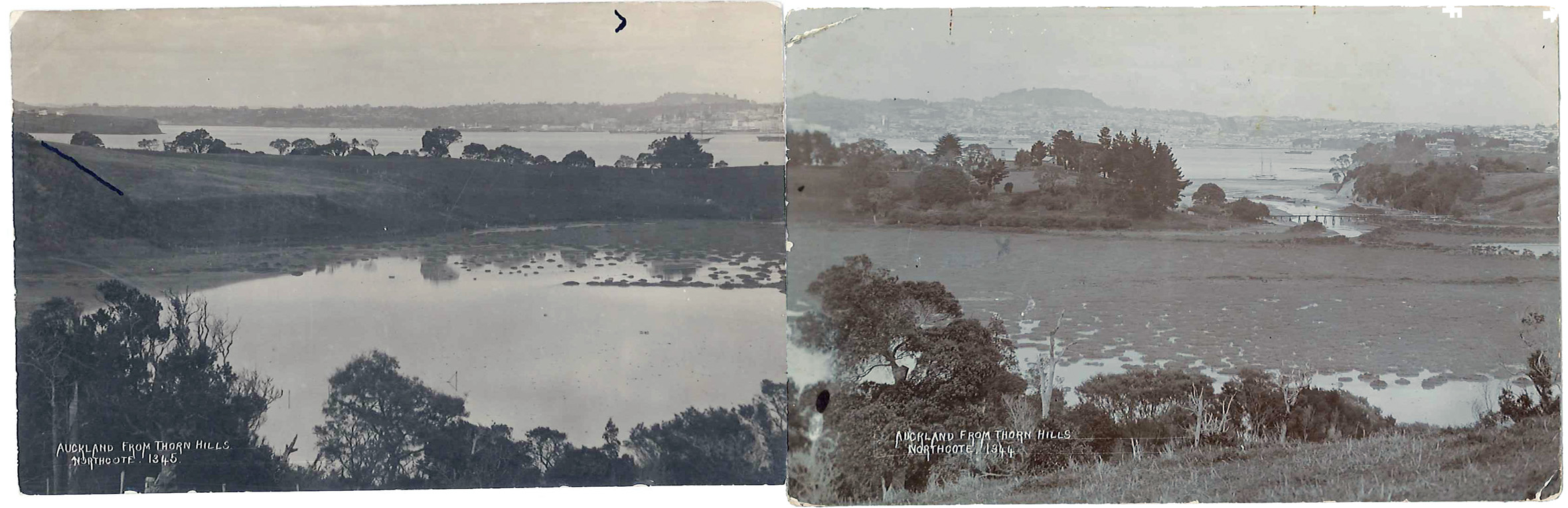
Two postcards from around 1910, showing Onepoto domain before it was reclaimed.

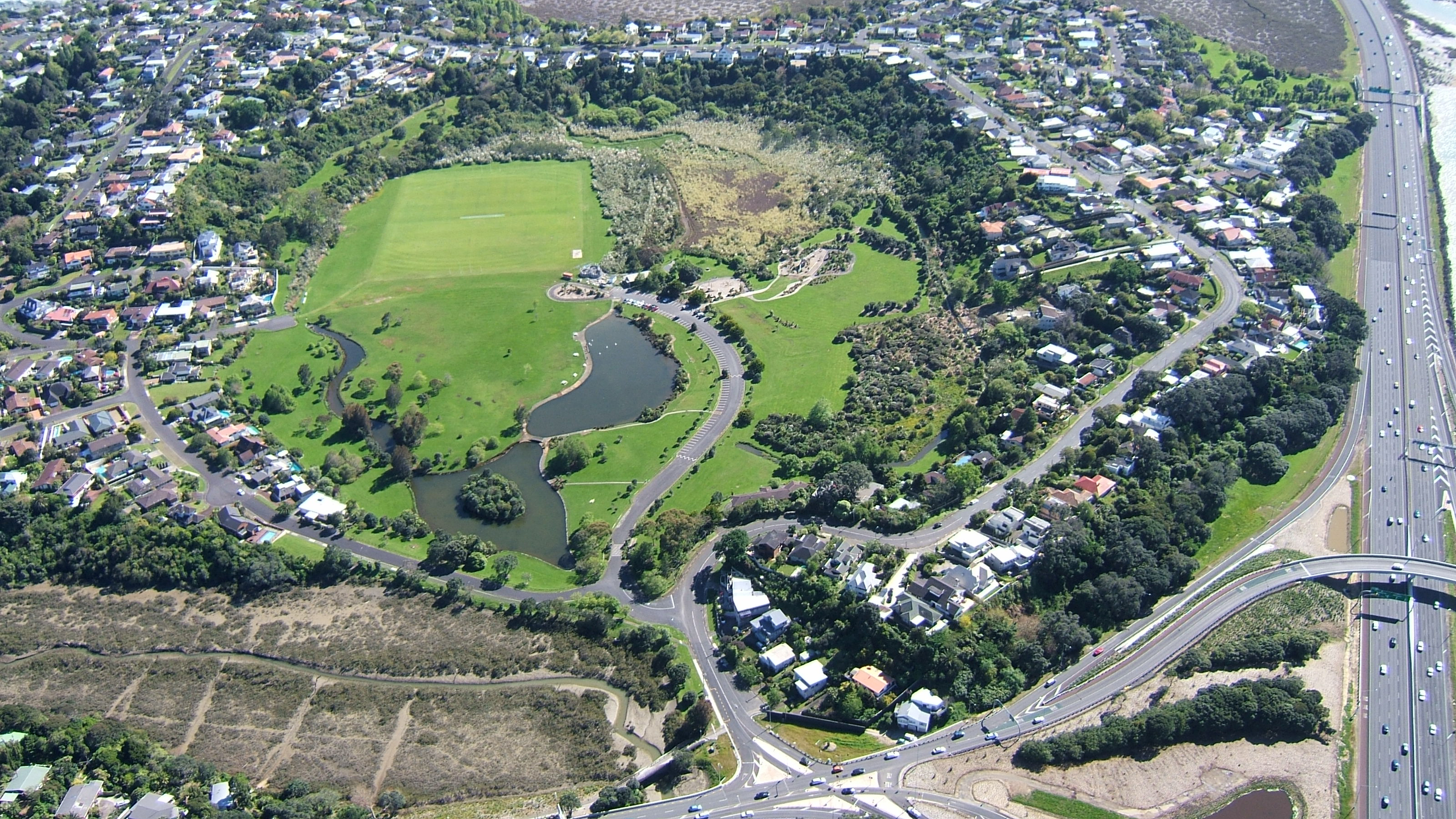
Onepoto (2009)

Onepoto is the name of a volcanic explosion crater (or maar) on the North Shore in Auckland, New Zealand. It is a part of the Auckland volcanic field. It should not be confused with Onepoto Hill, which is a volcanic feature of the South Auckland volcanic field.

== History ==
Located near the approaches to the Auckland Harbour Bridge, it was created by a series of eruptions approximately 185,000 years ago. Onepoto and neighbouring Tank Farm were fresh water lakes when sea levels were lower using the Last Glacial Maximum. As sea levels rose, the waters of the Waitematā Harbour breached the tuff rings of the craters, becoming tidal lagoons.

Some parts of the tuff ring were quarried away in the 1950s to provide fill for the Northern Motorway. In 1975, the crater was reclaimed to create sports fields. The modern Onepoto Domain features a variety of sports fields, ponds, playgrounds and walks.

== See also ==
- Onepoto Bridge, a bridge offering views of the area
- Tank Farm, a neighbouring crater
