= Sarah Sophia Stothard =

New Zealand teacher and educationalist

Sarah Sophia Stothard (1825–1901) was a New Zealand teacher and educationalist. She was born in London, England, in about 1825. In 1860 she came to New Zealand.
