= Tank Farm =

Volcanic crater in the Auckland Volcanic Field, New Zealand

Coordinates: 36.8020°S 174.7533°E

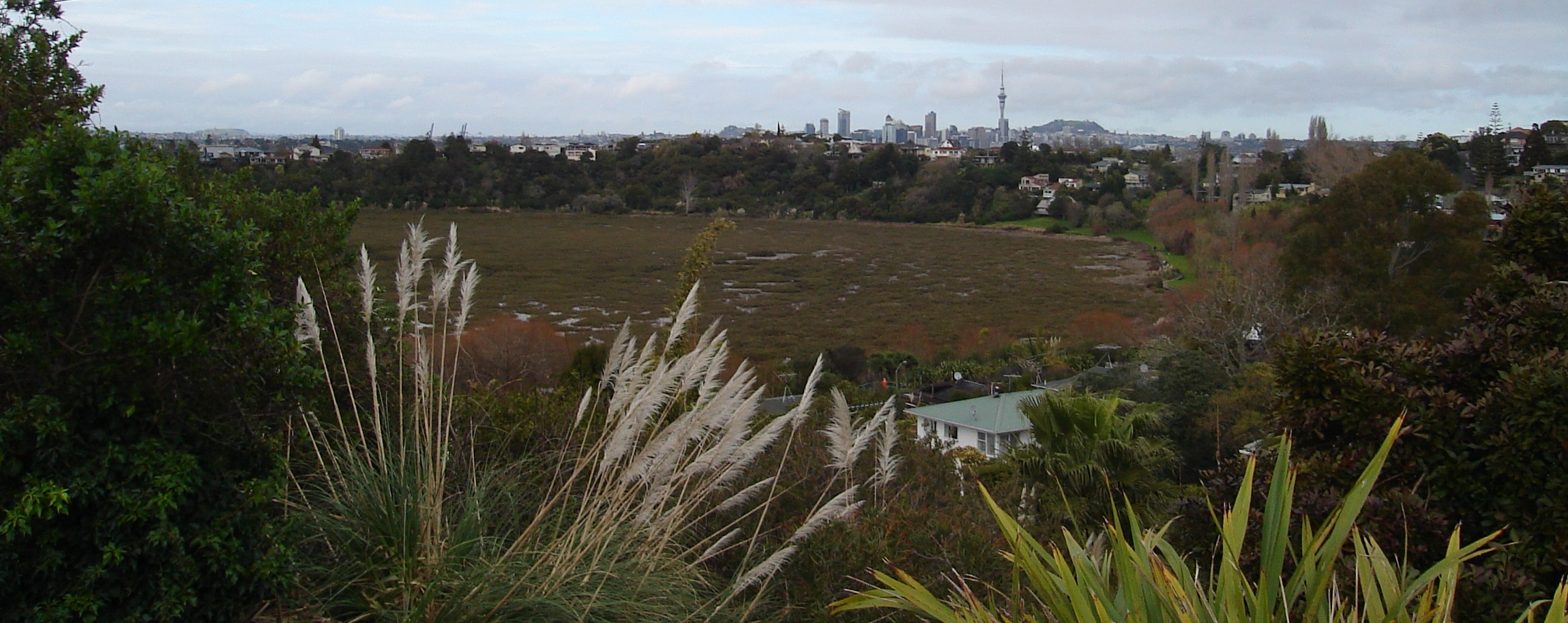
The crater / lagoon.

Tank Farm (sometimes Tuff Crater) is the name of a volcanic explosion crater (or maar) on the North Shore of Auckland, New Zealand, near the approaches to the Auckland Harbour Bridge.

== Geology ==
Part of the Auckland volcanic field, it was created by a series of explosive eruptions. Although its age is unknown it could be one of the older volcanoes in Auckland like its neighbours Onepoto and Lake Pupuke. Originally a freshwater lake, it later became a tidal lagoon when the sea levels rose after the last ice age. Tank Farm is mostly in its natural state, though some parts of the tuff ring were quarried and its name stems from the petrochemicals storage tanks located here during World War II.

Tank Farm and neighbouring Onepoto were fresh water lakes when sea levels were lower using the Last Glacial Maximum. As sea levels rose, the waters of the Waitematā Harbour breached the tuff rings of the craters, becoming tidal lagoons.

== History ==
Its Māori name is Te Kopua o Matakamokamo, meaning 'the basin of Matakamokamo'. Matakamokamo is an ancestral figure in Māori mythology tradition who, during a domestic argument, is said to have inadvertently cursed the goddess of fire, Mahuika. As punishment, the goddess called on the parent god Mataoho, who had the necessary powers, to send up numerous volcanic eruptions to plague the hot-tempered man and his wife Matakerepo. The two eruptions that were eventually fatal to the couple were said to be at the sites of what is now called Tank Farm and Onepoto Domain respectively. Consequently, the former was named Te Kopua o Matakamokamo, and the latter Te Kopua o Matakerepo.

The local council uses the name Tuff Crater for this volcano - a name taken from Hochstetter's (1864) map of the volcanoes of Auckland where a number of volcanoes, including Tank Farm, were each labelled "tuff crater" or "tuff craters". The name Tank Farm became popularised during World War II, when bulk fuel storage tanks were constructed adjacent to the crater.

The crater is now surrounded by a 35-hectare nature reserve.

== See also ==
- Onepoto, a neighbouring crater
